= List of governments of Lithuania (1918–1940) =

The list gives the composition of the governments of the Republic of Lithuania from 1918 to 1940. During that period Lithuania was an independent republic. From 1918 to December 1926 it was a democracy and the governments were formed from members of various parties. After the coup of 1926, Lithuania was ruled by authoritarian Antanas Smetona and his party, the Lithuanian National Union. Only the last two governments included members from the opposition.

Sources sometimes give conflicting data about the ministers, especially from the early governments. That is because those governments were short-lived, formed during the time of war, and not well documented.

== Governments ==
Ministry	1st Government November 11, 1918 December 26, 1918	2nd Government December 26, 1918 March 5, 1919	3rd Government March 12, 1919 April 12, 1919
Prime Minister	Augustinas Voldemaras	Mykolas Sleževičius	Pranas Dovydaitis
Foreign Affairs	Augustinas Voldemaras		
Internal Affairs	Vladas Stašinskas	Jonas Vileišis	Aleksandras Stulginskis
Defense	Augustinas Voldemaras and Mykolas Velykis	Mykolas Velykis	Antanas Merkys
Justice	Petras Leonas		Liudas Noreika
Finance	Martynas Yčas		
Commerce and Industry		Jonas Šimkus	
Agriculture and State Resources	Juozas Tūbelis		Povilas Matulionis
Education	Jonas Yčas	Mykolas Biržiška	Jonas Yčas
Provision and Public Work	Vladas Stašinskas	Juozas Paknys	Aleksandras Stulginskis
Communications	Matynas Yčas	Jonas Šimoliūnas	
Without Portfolio for Belarusian Affairs	Juozapas Voronko		
Without Portfolio for Jewish Affairs	Jocob Wygodsky		
Without Portfolio		Aleksandras Stulginskis	
Ministry	4th Government April 12, 1919 October 2, 1919	5th Government October 7, 1919 June 15, 1920	6th Government June 19, 1920 January 18, 1922
Prime Minister	Mykolas Sleževičius	Ernestas Galvanauskas	Kazys Grinius
Foreign Affairs	Augustinas Voldemaras		Juozas Purickis, Vladas Jurgutis, Petras Klimas, and Vladas Jurgutis
Internal Affairs	Petras Leonas	Eliziejus Draugelis	Rapolas Skipitis
Defense	Antanas Merkys and Povilas Žadeikis	Pranas Liatukas	Konstantinas Žukas and Jonas Šimkus
Justice	Liudas Noreika		Vincas Karoblis
Finance	Jonas Vileišis	Ernestas Galvanauskas	
Commerce, and Industry	Jonas Šimkus		
Agriculture and State Resources	Aleksandras Stulginskis	Juozas Tūbelis	Jonas Pranas Aleksa
Education	Juozas Tūbelis		Kazys Bizauskas
Supply and Provision	Steponas Kairys		
Labor and Social Security	Juozas Paknys		
Communications	Valdemaras Čarneckis		Ernestas Galvanauskas
Without Portfolio for Belarusian Affairs	Juozapas Voronko		Dominik Semashko
Without Portfolio for Jewish Affairs	Max Soloveitzik		
Without Portfolio	Jokūbas Šernas		
Ministry	7th Government February 2, 1922 February 22, 1923	8th Government February 22, 1923 June 28, 1923	9th Government June 29, 1923 June 17, 1924
Prime Minister	Ernestas Galvanauskas		
Foreign Affairs	Vladas Jurgutis and Ernestas Galvanauskas	Ernestas Galvanauskas	
Internal Affairs	Kazimieras Oleka		Karolis Žalkauskas
Defense	Balys Sližys		
Justice	Vincas Karoblis		Antanas Tumėnas
Finance, Commerce, and Industry	Jonas Dobkevičius and Vytautas Petrulis	Vytautas Petrulis	
Agriculture and State Resources	Jonas Pranas Aleksa		Mykolas Krupavičius
Education	Petras Juodakis		Leonas Bistras
Communications	Petras Vileišis	Benediktas Tomaševičius	Tomas Norus-Naruševičius
Without Portfolio for Belarusian Affairs	Dominik Semashko	Ernestas Galvanauskas	
Without Portfolio for Jewish Affairs	Max Soloveitzik till April 1922, then Julius Brutzkus	Bernard Naftal Friedman	Simon Rosenbaum
Ministry	10th Government June 18, 1924 January 27, 1925	11th Government February 4, 1925 September 19, 1925	12th Government September 25, 1925 May 31, 1926
Prime Minister	Antanas Tumėnas	Vytautas Petrulis	Leonas Bistras
Foreign Affairs	Voldemaras Čarneckis		Mečislovas Reinys and Leonas Bistras
Internal Affairs	Antanas Tumėnas and Zigmas Starkus	Antanas Endziulaitis	
Defense	Teodoras Daukantas		Leonas Bistras
Justice	Antanas Tumėnas		Vincas Karoblis
Finance	Vytautas Petrulis		Petras Karvelis
Agriculture and State Resources	Mykolas Krupavičius		
Education	Leonas Bistras	Kazys Jokantas	
Communications	Balys Sližys		
Ministry	13th Government June 15, 1926 December 17, 1926	14th Government December 17, 1926 September 19, 1929	15th Government September 23, 1929 June 8, 1934
Prime Minister	Mykolas Sleževičius	Augustinas Voldemaras	Juozas Tūbelis
Foreign Affairs	Mykolas Sleževičius	Augustinas Voldemaras	Juozas Tūbelis and Dovas Zaunius
Internal Affairs	Vladas Požėla	Ignas Musteikis	Ignas Musteika, Petras Aravičius, and Steponas Rusteika
Defense	Juozas Papečkys	Antanas Merkys, Teodoras Daukantas, and Augustinas Voldemaras	Jonas Variakojis and Balys Giedraitis
Justice	Mykolas Sleževičius	Stasys Šilingas and Aleksandras Žilinskas	Aleksandras Žilinskas
Finance	Albinas Rimka	Petras Karvelis and Juozas Tūbelis	Juozas Tūbelis
Agriculture	Jurgis Kirkščiūnas	Jonas Pranas Aleksa	
Education	Vincas Čepinskis	Leonas Bistras and Konstantinas Šakenis	Konstantinas Šakenis
Communications	Benediktas Tomaševičius	Juozas Jankevičius, Stasys Čiurlionis, and Jonas Variakojis	Vytautas Vileišis
Ministry	16th Government June 12, 1934 September 6, 1935	17th Government September 6, 1935 March 24, 1938	18th Government March 24, 1938 December 5, 1938
Prime Minister	Juozas Tūbelis		Vladas Mironas
Foreign Affairs	Stasys Lozoraitis		
Internal Affairs	Steponas Rusteika	Julius Čaplikas	Silvestras Leonas
Defense	Petras Šniukšta	Petras Šniukšta and Stasys Dirmantas	Stasys Raštikis
Justice	Stasys Šilingas		Boleslovas Masiulis and Vladas Stašinskas
Finance	Juozas Tūbelis		Julius Indrišiūnas
Agriculture	Jonas Pranas Aleksa	Stasys Putvinskis	Juozas Tūbelis and Vladas Mironas
Education	Juozas Tonkūnas		
Communications	Jokūbas Stanišauskas		
Ministry	19th Government December 5, 1938 March 27, 1939	20th Government March 28, 1939 November 21, 1939	21st Government November 21, 1939 June 15, 1940
Prime Minister	Vladas Mironas	Jonas Černius	Antanas Merkys
Foreign Affairs	Juozas Urbšys		
Internal Affairs	Silvestras Leonas	Kazys Skučas	
Defense	Kazys Musteikis		
Justice	Jonas Gudauskis	Antanas Tamošaitis	
Finance	Julius Indrišiūnas	Jonas Sutkus	Ernestas Galvanauskas
Agriculture	Juozas Skaisgiris	Jurgis Krikščiūnas	Juozas Audėnas
Education	Juozas Tonkūnas	Leonas Bistras	Kazys Jokantas
Communications	Kazys Germanas		Jonas Mailiūnas
