= Vincas Karoblis =

Lithuanian politician (1884–1928)

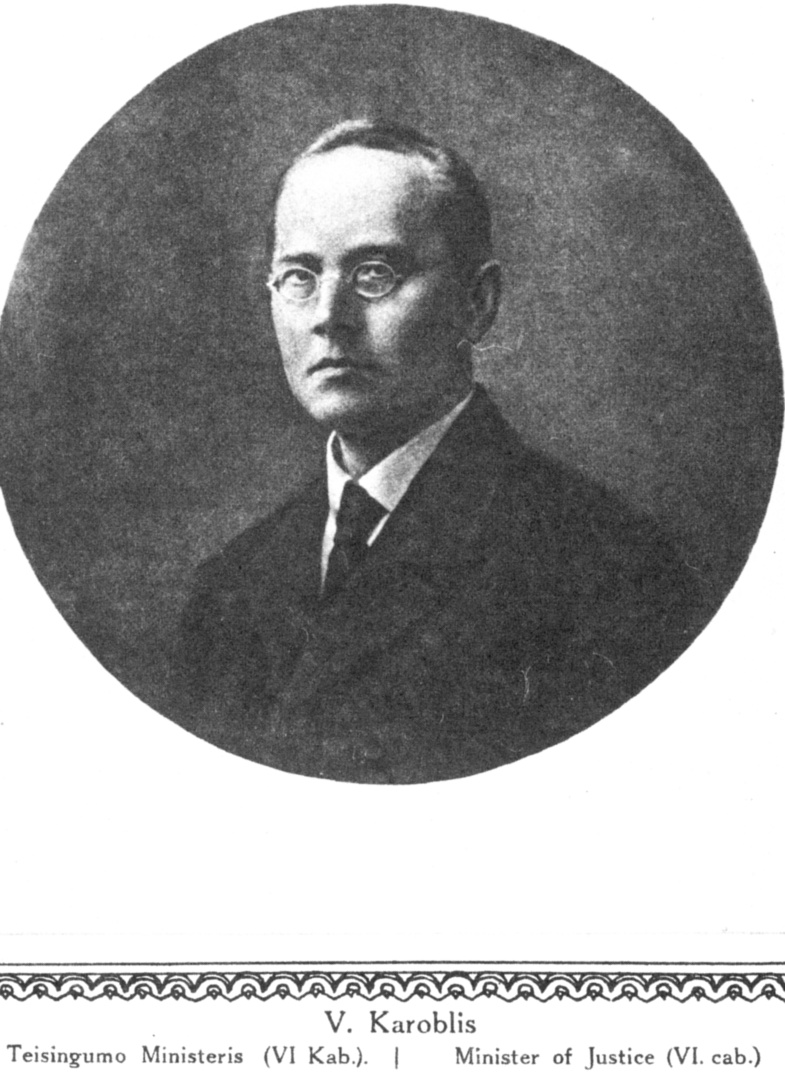
- Karoblis in Lithuania Album (1921)

Minister of Justice
- In office 19 June 1920 – 29 June 1923
- Prime Minister: Kazys Grinius; Ernestas Galvanauskas
- Preceded by: Liudas Noreika
- Succeeded by: Antanas Tumėnas

Minister of Justice
- In office 25 September 1925 – 31 May 1926
- Prime Minister: Leonas Bistras
- Preceded by: Antanas Tumėnas
- Succeeded by: Mykolas Sleževičius

Personal details
- Born: 20 September 1866 Natiškiai, Russian Empire
- Died: 25 May 1939 (aged 72) Kukauka, Lithuania
- Party: Farmers' Association
- Education: University of Kyiv
- Occupation: Jurist, notary, minister

Vincas Karoblis (20 September 1866 – 25 May 1939) was a Lithuanian jurist who served as the minister of justice in 1920–1923 and 1925–1926.

Educated as a jurist at the University of Kyiv, Karoblis worked as a secretary of the district court in Riga (1895–1908) and chief notary in Vitebsk (1908–1918). He returned to Lithuania in mid-1918 and was appointed to the district court in Kaunas in July 1919. He was the minister of justice from June 1920 to June 1923 and again from September 1925 to May 1926 in four different cabinets of Lithuania. He worked as the auditor general from March 1924 to September 1925.

As a member of the Farmers' Association, he was a member of the Seimas (Lithuania's parliament) from November 1922 to March 1924 and from June 1926 to April 1927. He then retired and spent time in Kaunas and his wife's farm in Kukauka where he died in 1939.

== Biography ==
=== Russian Empire ===
Karoblis was born on 20 September 1866 Natiškiai near Vabalninkas in present-day northern Lithuania.

Karoblis studied at the Šiauliai Gymnasium. He graduated with a law degree from the University of Kyiv in 1894 and found employment as an assistant to the secretary of the Riga district court. He was promoted to secretary in 1898. In 1908, he moved to Vitebsk where he worked as the chief notary. During World War I, he organized a chapter of the Lithuanian Society for the Relief of War Sufferers and was a member of the Imperial Tatiana Committee.

=== Government official ===
Karoblis returned to Lithuania in July 1918. The newly formed government of Lithuania appointed him as a judge of the Vilnius district court in December 1918, but the government had to evacuate from the city due to the start of the Lithuanian–Soviet War. He was then appointed to the Kaunas district court on 22 July 1919.

As a member of the Farmers' Association, Karoblis was the minister of justice in three cabinets of Lithuania under prime ministers Kazys Grinius and Ernestas Galvanauskas from 19 June 1920 to 29 June 1923. For some time, he was also a deputy prime minister. He worked as the auditor general from March 1924 to September 1925. He returned as the minister of justice in the cabinet of Leonas Bistras, serving from 25 September 1925 to 31 May 1926.

=== Member of the Seimas ===
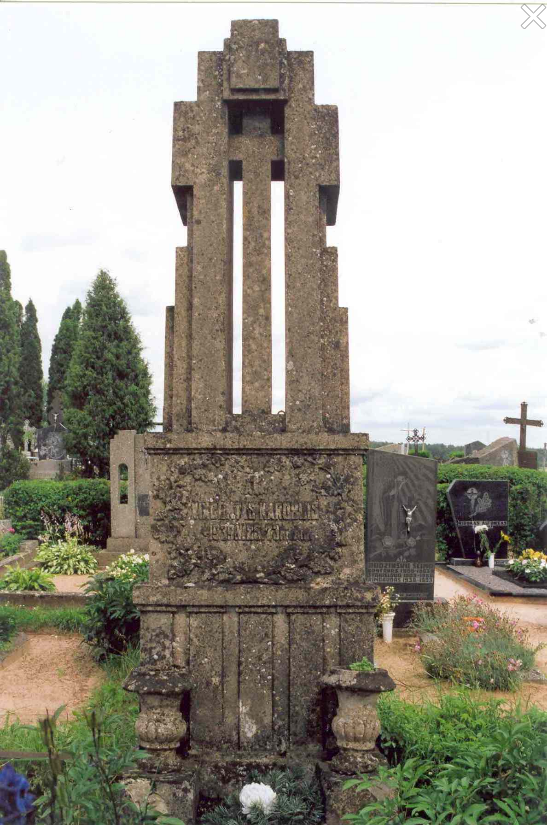
Grave of Karoblis in Subačius

On the ticket of the Farmers' Association, Karoblis was elected to the First, Second, and Third Seimas. At the Seimas, he was a member of the Lithuanian Christian Democratic Party electoral bloc. However, he resigned from the Second Seimas on 2 March 1924; his seat was taken by Bernardas Sakalauskas.

Karoblis was a member of several parliamentary committees. In all three Seimas, he was a member of the Committee on Law and Editing which reviewed the language of the law from a technical standpoint, ensured accuracy of terms, and checked that amendments did not contradict each other. In the First Seimas, he was a member of the Committee on Complaints and Petitions (from 6 February 1923). In the Second Seimas, he was member of the Committee on Municipalities and Administration (from 8 June 1923), the Committee on Education (from 14 July 1923), and Committee on Foreign Affairs (from 5 October 1923). In the Third Seimas, he was a substitute for members of the Committee on Municipalities and Administration (from 6 June 1926).

In the Second Seimas, Karoblis referred several laws between October 1923 and February 1924, including amendments to the citizenship law and amendments to the law on courts.

In the Third Seimas, Karoblis spoke on issues related to agriculture, state budget, Klaipėda Region. He opposed the law on political amnesty that was adopted in June 1926. He was a member of a committee that investigated the arrest of Juozas Pajaujis-Javis, a member of the Seimas accused of organizing a coup against president Antanas Smetona. Unlike most members of the committee, he supported Pajaujis' arrest.

=== Later life and death ===
After the Third Seimas was dissolved on 12 April 1927, Karoblis retired from politics and government work. He lived in Kaunas and his wife's family's farm in the Kukauka homestead (khutor). According to 1940 data, his mother-in-law owned 74.31 hectares (183.6 acres) in Kukauka. In spring 1939, Karoblis contracted pneumonia and died on 25 May 1939 in Kukauna. He was buried in the parish cemetery in nearby Subačius.
