= Voldemaras Čarneckis =

Lithuanian politician and diplomat (1893–1942)

Voldemaras Vytautas Čarneckis
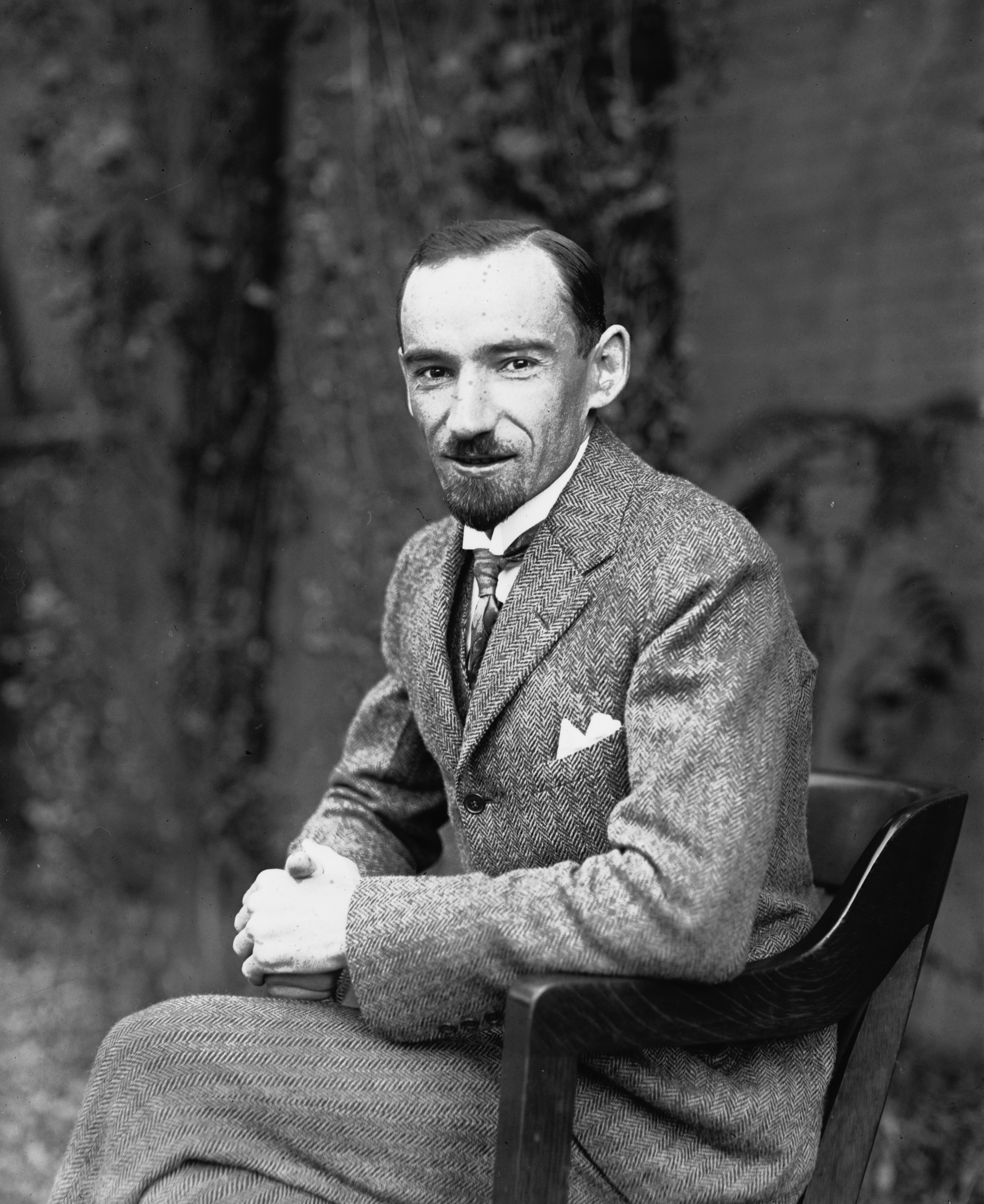
- Čarneckis in 1922

Minister of Communications
- In office 12 April 1919 – 19 June 1920
- Prime Minister: Mykolas Sleževičius; Ernestas Galvanauskas
- Preceded by: Jonas Šimoliūnas
- Succeeded by: Ernestas Galvanauskas

Minister of Foreign Affairs
- In office 18 June 1924 – 25 September 1925
- Prime Minister: Antanas Tumėnas; Vytautas Petrulis
- Preceded by: Ernestas Galvanauskas
- Succeeded by: Mečislovas Reinys

Personal details
- Born: 9 January 1893 Pajiesys, Congress Poland
- Died: 4 November 1942 (aged 49) Sverdlovsk, Soviet Union
- Cause of death: Execution by the NKVD
- Party: Lithuanian Christian Democratic Party
- Education: Electrotechnical Institute of Emperor Alexander III
- Occupation: Politician, diplomat

Voldemaras Vytautas Čarneckis (9 January 1893 – 4 November 1942) was a Lithuanian politician and diplomat. He served as the acting minister of finance (December 1918 – March 1919), minister of communications (April 1919 – June 1920), and minister of foreign affairs (June 1924 – September 1925).

Čarneckis joined the Lithuanian cultural life as a student at the Electrotechnical Institute of Emperor Alexander III. In 1916, he was drafted to an engineering unit of the Imperial Russian Army. In December 1917, he became the commander of the Separate Lithuanian Battalion in Rivne which had about 500 men by February 1918. Čarneckis returned to Lithuania and was coopted by the Council of Lithuania in November 1918. As the minister of communications, he worked on taking control over the mail, telegram, telephone, roads, and railroads from the retreating German army. Čarneckis was elected to the Constituent Assembly of Lithuania in April 1920 and was a member of the Lithuanian delegation negotiating the Suwałki Agreement in October 1920. He resigned from the Constituent Assembly in November 1921 to pursue diplomatic career.

Čarneckis was the first Lithuanian representative to the United States (1921–1923) and briefly represented Lithuania in the United Kingdom. He became the minister of foreign affairs in June 1924. He worked on the ratification of the Klaipėda Convention, increasing cooperation among the Baltic states, responding to the Concordat of 1925 which resulted in the termination of diplomatic relations with the Holy See, and conducting negotiations with Poland which proved to be highly unpopular and forced the resignation of the cabinet in September 1925. He was then posted as the Lithuanian envoy to Italy until 1939.

Čarneckis returned to Lithuania in 1940 to work for the Ministry of Foreign Affairs. He was arrested during the June 1941 deportation and imprisoned at Sevurallag. NKVD accused 15 Lithuanians, including Čarneckis, of organizing an armed mutiny inside the Gulag. Čarneckis was sentenced to death and executed in November 1942.

== Biography ==
=== Early life and education ===
Čarneckis was born on 9 January 1893 in Pajiesys near Marijampolė in Congress Poland. His father Antanas was a forester who had completed distance courses at the Saint Petersburg Forestry Institute. He worked for the owners of the Aštrioji Kirsna Manor and later for the Komar family in the Mogilev Governorate. The family had eight children, but five died in their youth.

Čarneckis attended a primary school in Mockava and gymnasium in Suwałki. In Suwałki, he lived with the family of Stasys Zaskevičius, the future general in the Lithuanian Army. He graduated in 1911 and chose to study at the Electrotechnical Institute of Emperor Alexander III in Saint Petersburg.

As a university student, Čarneckis was a roommate of Aleksandras Stulginskis and Jonas Vailokaitis who encouraged him to join Lithuanian political and cultural life. In 1912–1916, he was chairman of a local chapter of Ateitis, a Catholic youth organization, and a member of a mutual aid society of Lithuanian students. After the outbreak of World War I, he was an active member of the Lithuanian Society for the Relief of War Sufferers. In June 1915, he was a member of a commission tasked with opening a shelter–workshop for refugee children in Vilnius but the plans were not realized. In 1916, he worked with the Lithuanian Society in Saint Petersburg.

=== Military service ===
In 1916, he was drafted to an engineering unit of the Imperial Russian Army and sent to the Eastern Front. He continued to participate in Lithuanian activities. On 2–4 December 1917, he chaired a meeting of Lithuanian soldiers in Rivne. The meeting adopted several resolutions, including one calling for full independence for Lithuania, and decided to organize the Separate Lithuanian Battalion commanded by Čarneckis. Permission to organize a transport battalion was given on 12 January 1918. By the end of February, the battalion had about 500 men. After the Treaty of Brest-Litovsk of 3 March 1918, Russian units retreated from Rivne and Ukraine, but the Lithuanian unit remained. The unit guarded warehouses and other strategic objects. Its commander Čarneckis was replaced by Edvardas Adamkavičius in May 1918 as the government insisted that the unit was to be commanded by an officer.

=== Council of Lithuania ===
Čarneckis returned to Lithuania in July 1918. He joined a commission on refugees of the Council of Lithuania. It was chaired by Aleksandras Stulginskis and worked on organizing Lithuanian refugee return to Lithuania. On 27 November 1918, Čarneckis, as a member of the Lithuanian Christian Democratic Party, was coopted by the Council of Lithuania. He became a member of the organizational committee of the Second Conference of the State of Lithuania which was held on 16 January 1919 in Kaunas. On 14 March 1919, Čarneckis became the first secretary of the presidium of the Council of Lithuania, but presidium resigned on 4 April 1919.

At the end of December 1918, when the prime minister Augustinas Voldemaras and minister of finance Martynas Yčas departed to Germany to negotiate a government loan, Mykolas Sleževičius formed a new government and tasked Čarneckis with the administration of the Ministry of Finance. In January 1919, Čarneckis signed law that residents should pay pre-war (i.e. Tsarist Russian) taxes until Lithuania implemented its own tax system. He also implemented postal and import tariffs. On 1 March 1919, together with other ministers, Čarneckis signed a treaty with Latvia that allowed Lithuania to use the port of Liepāja in exchange for a loan of 5 million German marks. On 13 March 1919, he was replaced by Vytautas Petrulis in the short-lived cabinet of Pranas Dovydaitis.

=== Minister of communications ===
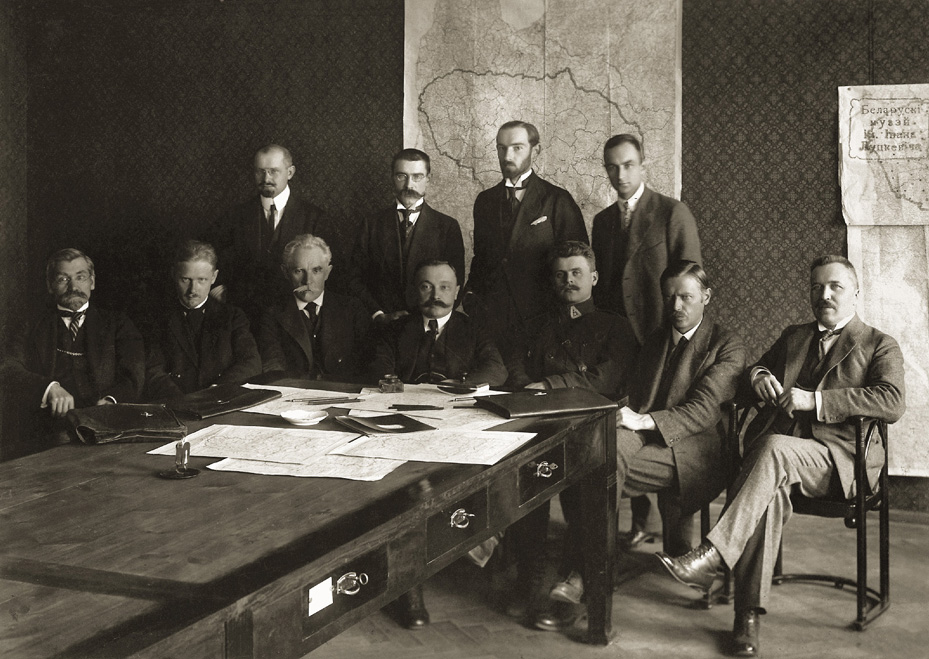
4th cabinet of Lithuania (Čarneckis stands second from the right)

On 15 April 1919, Čarneckis became the minister of communications in the 4th government of the prime minister Mykolas Sleževičius. In the government of Ernestas Galvanauskas, Čarneckis was offered the role of the minister of interior but he refused due to inexperience and continued as the minister of communications until 19 June 1920.

He worked on organizing the ministry and on taking control over the mail, telegram, telephone, roads, and railroads from the retreating German army. It was a difficult task since most means of transportation were destroyed or neglected during the war and there was a severe lack of qualified Lithuanian workers. On 4 July 1919, Sleževičius and Čarneckis signed a treaty with Germany regarding the control of railroads. In March 1920, the ministry opened the first steamboat line between Kaunas and Jurbarkas. The ministry worked to expand postal service. In about a year, 81 new post offices were opened and regular international mail service was established with all countries, except Poland and the Soviet Union.

In the early morning of 28 August 1919, Čarneckis warned the Lithuanian government that several lines of telephone and telegraph were cut which signified the planned start of the Polish coup attempt in Lithuania. His sister Aldona Čarneckaitė was instrumental in obtaining documents that allowed the Lithuanian intelligence services to liquidate the Polish Military Organization in Lithuania.

=== Constituent Assembly ===
On 21 July 1920, Čarneckis was elected to the city council of Kaunas. He resigned on 20 May 1921 and was replaced by Matas Šalčius.

In April 1920, Čarneckis was elected to the Constituent Assembly of Lithuania as a representative of the Lithuanian Christian Democratic Party. At the assembly, he worked with the fraction of the Farmers' Association. He was a secretary of the parliamentary committee on foreign affairs and a member of the parliamentary committee on economy. He was a member of a committee drafting the statute of the Constituent Assembly and presented it to the assembly. As a member of the economy committee, Čarneckis assisted with the drafting of the law on the introduction of the Lithuanian litas. During the assembly sessions, he most frequently spoke on foreign affairs.

He was a member of the Lithuanian delegations that negotiated with Poland in Kalvarija on 16–18 September 1920 and in Suwałki where the Suwałki Agreement was concluded on 7 October 1920. However, the following day, Poland staged the Żeligowski's Mutiny and captured Vilnius Region. In November 1920, Čarneckis accompanied Augustinas Voldemaras to the League of Nations which attempted to mediate the dispute between Lithuania and Poland.

Due to the conflict with Poland, Lithuania's de jure recognition was delayed. Therefore, in February 1921, the Constituent Assembly sent a delegation, which included Čarneckis, to Estonia and Latvia in hopes of gaining their recognition and support. Čarneckis continued to work on the idea of a Baltic alliance when he became the minister of foreign affairs. Due to his pursuit of diplomatic career, Čarneckis officially resigned from the Constituent Assembly on 4 November 1921.

When the Constitution of Lithuania was adopted in August 1922, Christian Democrats proposed Čarneckis, Mykolas Krupavičius, and Aleksandras Stulginskis as the President of Lithuania. Čarneckis and Krupavičius refused, thus Stulginskis became the president.

=== Diplomat in Washington D.C. and London ===
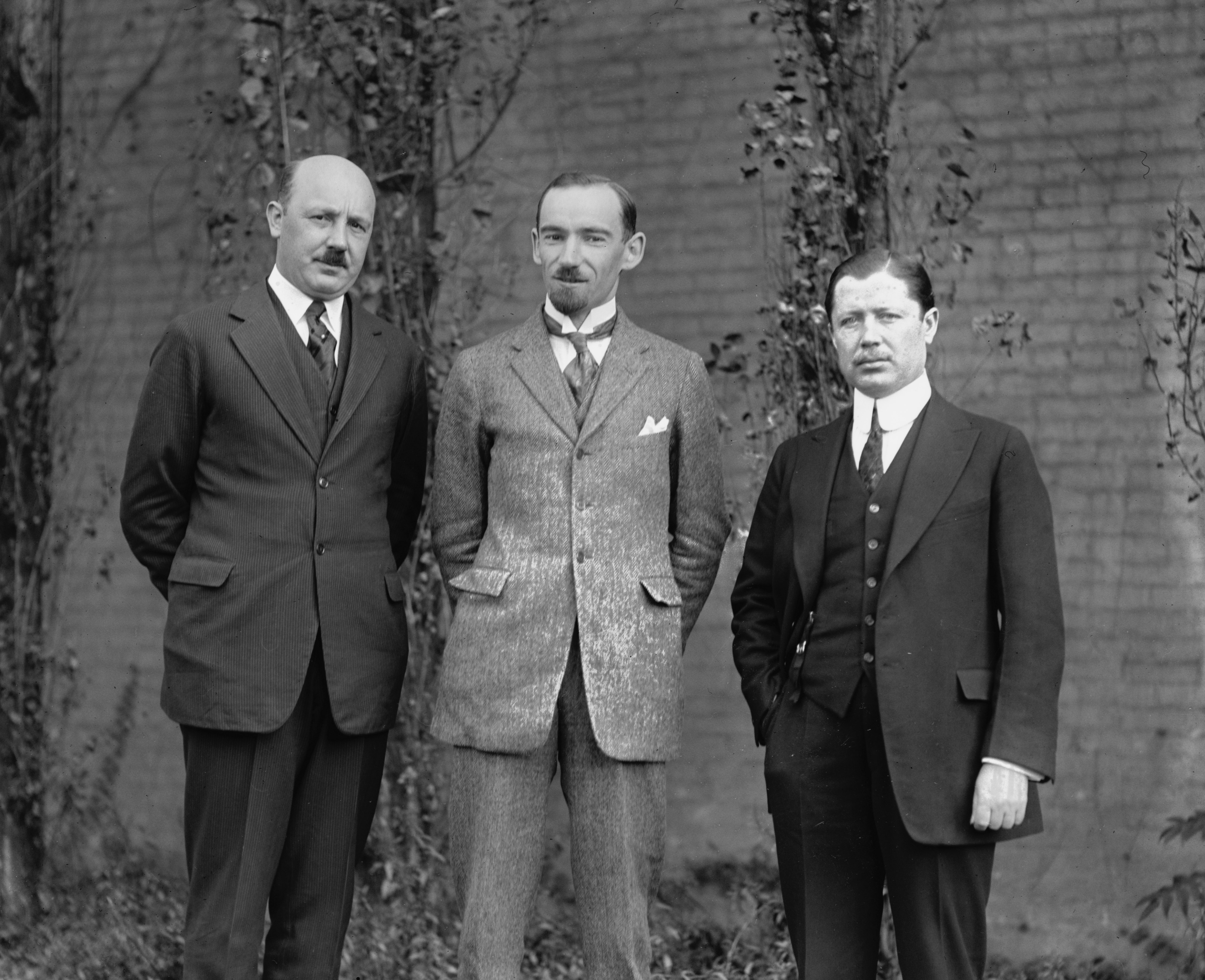
Čarneckis (middle) in the United States

On 15 April or 15 June 1921, Čarneckis became the Lithuanian representative in the United States. His main task was to get de jure recognition of Lithuania's independence from the United States. Since Lithuania was not officially recognized, Čarneckis did not have an official status and had to work informally through personal connections. He visited communities of Lithuanian Americans and rallied them to petition their representatives. He also allied with the Jewish community (at the time, Lithuania had granted significant autonomy to the Lithuanian Jews). He founded the Baltic American Society and drafted a petition in the name of several university professors arguing for the recognition of Lithuania.

United States recognized Lithuania de jure on 28 July 1922 and Čarneckis became the chargés d'affaires ad interim and worked to organize the official Lithuanian legation in Washington D.C.. He presented his letter of credence to the U.S. State Department on 11 October 1922. Čarneckis became an honorary member of the Academy of Political Science and the Metropolitan Club.

Čarneckis was a candidate to the First Seimas in the October 1922 election but was not elected. He was elected to the Second Seimas in May 1923 election but refused the post due to his diplomatic work. While in Washington D.C., Čarneckis met Eleonora Šaltenytė, a Lithuanian American activist, and they wed in 1923.

In November 1923, Čarneckis was reassigned to London. There he worked on a trade agreement with the United Kingdom and ensuring England's support for the Klaipėda Convention.

=== Minister of foreign affairs ===
On 18 June 1924, Čarneckis became the minister of foreign affairs in the government of Antanas Tumėnas. He returned to Lithuania on 6 July 1924. In its program, the new government outlined the following tasks: ratification of the Klaipėda Convention, conclusion of international trade agreements and particularly of a loan from the United Kingdom for the construction of Lithuanian railway, increase cooperation among the Baltic states, strengthening of consular services.

==== Klaipėda Region ====
Lithuania gained the Klaipėda Region after a staged revolt in January 1923. The Klaipėda Convention was concluded in May 1924 and needed to be ratified. Lithuania ratified on 30 June 1924. Lithuania also needed to conclude agreements with Germany over numerous technical issues, including border, citizenship, fishing rights, bridge maintenance, consular services, etc. These negotiations were led by Vaclovas Sidzikauskas. At the same time, Germany reacted to various complaints of discrimination by the German inhabitants of the region. In spring 1925, using excuse of preventing infectious disease, Germany started blocking Lithuanian exports of beef pork. Čarneckis issued a protest note, delayed amendments to the Lithuania–German trade treaty, and suggested a convention on sanitary matters.

==== Relations with the Holy See ====
Lithuania started discussing a concordat with the apostolic visitor Antonino Zecchini in October 1923, but Zecchini did not believe a concordat was necessary. In September 1924, Čarneckis revisited the issue in light of the negotiations between the Holy See and the Second Republic of Poland. Lithuanians wanted to see the Diocese of Vilnius and the Diocese of Sejny (which encompassed Vilnius Region and Suwałki Region disputed with Poland) administered directly by the Holy See and not part of the Polish ecclesiastical province.

However, the Concordat of 1925 was concluded in February 1925 without regard to the Lithuanian proposals. This caused protests in Lithuania and bilateral relations with the Holy See were officially severed in May 1925. Čarneckis supported a more moderate approach to the issue and later worked on normalizing the relations when he was the Lithuanian representative in Italy.

==== Relations with the Baltic States ====
Čarneckis was a strong proponent of establishing closer relations with Latvia and Estonia. Poland wanted to ally with Latvia, Estonia, and Finland (see Warsaw Accord) thus isolating Lithuania and forcing it to compromise on Vilnius. Čarneckis achieved some success with Latvia and its foreign minister Zigfrīds Anna Meierovics. Bilateral meetings were held in May and October 1924, and Čarneckis made an official visit to Riga in April 1925. The two countries signed a treaty on lumber transport via rivers and agreed to open negotiations on a conciliation and arbitration treaty. They also discussed a possible customs union though Čarneckis was cautious on the issue since Latvia's industry was more advanced than Lithuania's. However, the planned trilateral Baltic meeting in August 1925 did not take place due to the Polish pressure on Estonia.

==== Relations with Poland ====
On 2 June 1924 (just before Čarneckis' tenure), Lithuania received a diplomatic note from Raymond Poincaré, chairman of the Conference of Ambassadors, urging Lithuania to establish diplomatic relations with Poland. Čarneckis did not immediately respond as he hoped to raise the issue of Vilnius Region at the plenum of the League of Nations in September 1924 but Poland successfully blocked the issue from the agenda. Čarneckis then responded to Poincaré's note suggesting to convene an international conference to resolve the underlying territorial dispute. The idea received some support from Germany as it saw as an opportunity to revise the Treaty of Versailles. However, the Conference of Ambassadors replied that the issue of Vilnius had been already resolved. Thus Čarneckis' hopes that the Entente might help resolve the conflict with Poland proved to be fruitless.

In fall 1924, Poles in Lithuania submitted a ten-point complaint to the League of Nations alleging discrimination (e.g. requiring to use only the Lithuanian language for store signs or accounting records). Čarneckis had to send several delegations to the league to defend Lithuanian positions.

Prime minister Vytautas Petrulis pursued a different foreign policy and sought to normalize the relations with Poland. In summer 1925, he opened secret negotiations with Poland. Official negotiations over the limited issue of timber transport via the Neman River opened in September in Copenhagen while Čarneckis took a two-week vacation. His vacation was cut short when the Latvian foreign minister Meierovics was killed in a car crash and Čarneckis traveled to Riga for the funeral. Even such limited negotiations with Poland proved highly unpopular in Lithuania and Čarneckis was the first to submit his resignation on 19 September 1925 causing a government crisis. Petrulis cabinet continued to work until 25 September 1925. Without publicizing it, the successor prime minister Leonas Bistras attempted to continue the policy of rapprochement with Poland and thus did not consider Čarneckis for the minister of foreign affairs.

==== Financial matters ====
Lithuania gained the port of Klaipėda after the Klaipėda Revolt in January 1923, but there was no convenient railway link with the port from the rest of Lithuania. Therefore, the government planned to construct two railway lines Kėdainiai–Lyduvėnai–Klaipėda and Amaliai–Telšiai–Kretinga. Čarneckis worked on obtaining a loan of one million pounds from the United Kingdom for the construction. However, the issue kept being delayed due to disputes over unpaid bills with Sir Alexander Gibb & Partners and the National Metal and Chemical Bank of Richard Tilden Smith. The new UK prime minister Stanley Baldwin was less supportive of the idea and the loan was never obtained.

On 5–12 December 1924, Čarneckis organized a conference of Lithuanian consuls. Its primary goal was improve Lithuania's foreign trade relations. He also worked on improving Lithuania's representation. During his tenure, it was decided to purchase premises for the Lithuanian legations in Paris, Berlin, and Washington D.C. Kaunas needed a modern hotel where diplomats and dignitaries could stay during their visits. Therefore, his predecessor Ernestas Galvanauskas decided to purchase Hotel Metropolis and modernize it. Čarneckis continued this work organizing the state-owned Hotel Lietuva and obtaining funds for its reconstruction.

=== Diplomat in Rome ===
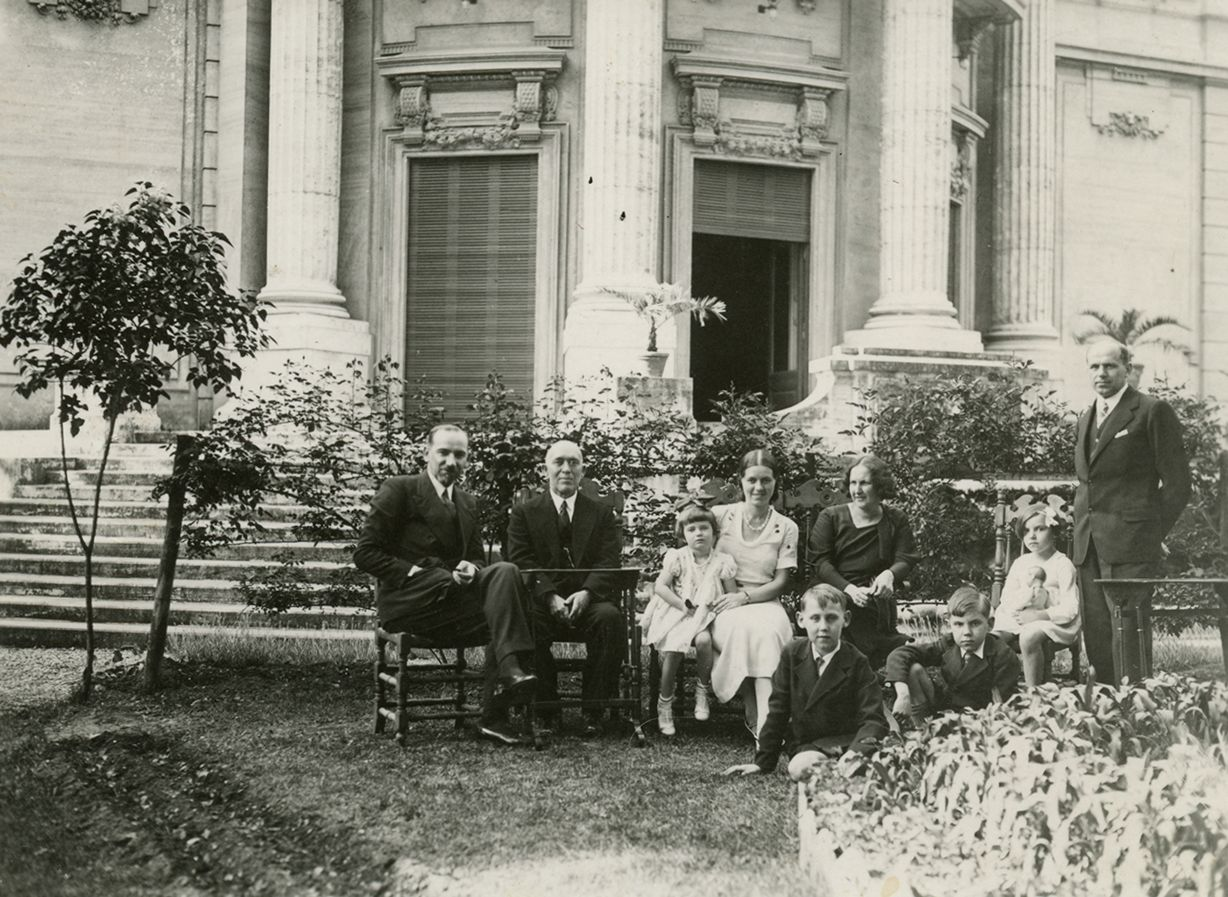
Čarneckis and Graužinis families next to Villa Lituania

On 7 November 1925, Čarneckis became the Lithuanian envoy extraordinary and minister plenipotentiary to Rome. He continued to represent Lithuania in Italy until 14 February 1939. Initially, he also curated the Lithuanian relation with the Holy Sea as the official relations were terminated after the Concordat of 1925 with the Second Polish Republic. Italy was not particularly active in Lithuanian foreign affairs, but it was one of the signatories of the Klaipėda Convention and a major European power. Čarneckis worked to ensure Italy's support for Lithuanian causes, particularly in its conflict with Poland.

Čarneckis worked on several international treaties, establishing honorary consulates in Italy, awarding Italian dignitaries with the Lithuanian state orders, publishing Lithuania-related articles in the Italian press and via the International Institute of Agriculture. In September 1927, he organized the official state visit of the Prime Minister Augustinas Voldemaras to Rome. Two treaties on conciliation and trade were signed during the visit. Consular and extradition treaties were concluded in 1934. Another trade treaty was concluded in 1936.

The Lithuanian legation moved to new premises, a villa that became known as Villa Lituania in 1933. Čarneckis and his wife Eleonora arranged the below-market rent and later purchase of the villa through personal connections. The villa hosted numerous official receptions, including Lithuanian pilots led by Antanas Gustaitis who flew to twelve European capitals in 1934 and the women's team that won silver in the EuroBasket Women 1938. A particularly large ball for 800 guests was hosted for the 20th anniversary of Lithuania's independence in 1938.

=== Soviet persecution ===
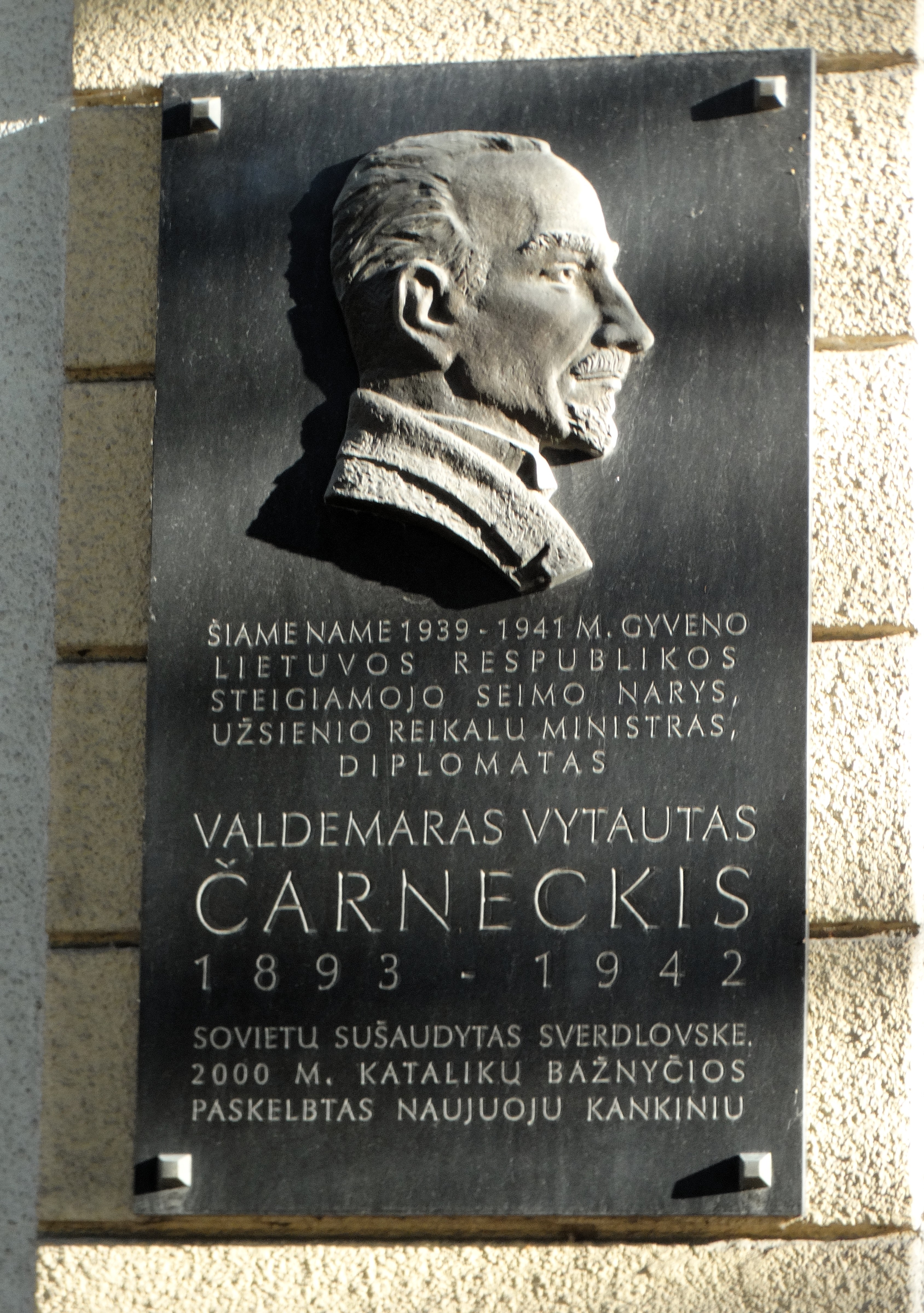
Memorial plaque to Čarneckis in Kaunas

On 15 February 1939, Čarneckis was replaced by Stasys Lozoraitis as the envoy to Rome. Čarneckis returned to Lithuania and worked as the director of the law and administration department of the Ministry of Foreign Affairs. He participated in the discussions of the Soviet ultimatum to Lithuania in June 1940 and relayed government's acceptance of the ultimatum to Moscow. After the Soviet occupation, he assisted with the liquidation of the ministry. He was an advisor of Vincas Krėvė-Mickevičius, the minister of foreign affairs in the People's Government of Lithuania. He was dismissed from the ministry effective 16 September 1940. He then worked as a consultant and a deputy director of the supply department of the People's Commissariat of Food Industry.

Čarneckis and his family (wife and five children) were arrested and deported during the June deportation in 1941. Čarneckis was imprisoned at Sevurallag near Sosva. He was forced to work as a carpenter and lumberjack. Due to hard work and poor living conditions, his health deteriorated and he spent three months in a Gulag hospital.

NKVD accused 15 Lithuanians (including Čarneckis, Vytautas Pranas Bičiūnas, and Juozas Papečkys) of organizing a "counter-revolutionary" group that prepared for an armed mutiny inside the Gulag. The group was transferred to an NKVD prison in Sverdlovsk (now Yekaterinburg) on 25 March 1942. Čarneckis was sentenced to death by the Special Council of the NKVD on 17 October 1942. He was executed by shooting on 4 November. The accused Lithuanians were shot in the NKVD prison in Sverdlovsk and were likely buried in a mass grave at the 12 kilometre marker on the highway to Moscow. In 1990s, Memorial to the Victims of Political Repression was built at the site with more than 18,000 names of the people buried there.

Čarneckis' family was deported to a camp near Bykovsky on the shores of the Laptev Sea. They received 3,000 Russian rubles from Lithuanian diplomats via the embassy of the United States in Moscow. They were able to survive particularly harsh conditions and return to Lithuania in 1958.

== Awards ==
Čarneckis received several state awards, including:

- Order of the Crown of Italy (2nd degree, 1927)
- Order of the Lithuanian Grand Duke Gediminas (2nd degree, 1932)
- Order of the Star of Italy (1st degree, 1933)
- Order of the Crown of Italy (1st degree, 1937)
- Order of Saints Maurice and Lazarus (2nd degree, 1939)

== Bibliography ==
- Gaigalaitė, Aldona; Skirius, Juozas; Kasparavičius, Algimantas; Veilentienė, Audronė (1999). "Lietuvos atstovai užsienio valstybėse 1918–1990 m." (PDF). Lietuvos užsienio reikalų ministrai: 1918–1940 (in Lithuanian). Kaunas: Šviesa. pp. 416–418. ISBN 5-430-02696-4.
- Jokubėnienė, Danutė (May 17–23, 2004). "Rekviem "Villa Lituania" Romoje". Ekstra. 19 (284): 24–27.
- Kavaliauskas, Vilius (3 August 2023). "Tema žurnalistams. Apie narsias ir… užmirštas moteris". Kauno žurnalistai (in Lithuanian). LŽS Kauno apskrities skyrius.
- Maksimaitis, Mindaugas (2011). Mažoji konstituanta: Lietuvos taryba atkuriant valstybingumą (in Lithuanian). Justitia. ISBN 978-9955-616-65-8.
- Petraitytė-Briedienė, Asta (2014). Tylieji priesaikos riteriai: Lietuvos pasiuntinybė Vašingtone šaltojo karo metais (in Lithuanian). Kaunas: Vytauto Didžiojo universitetas. ISBN 978-609-467-076-3.
- Skučaitė, Virginija (13 June 2009). "Diplomato šeima ir Sibire nepalūžo". Diena.lt (in Lithuanian).
- Svarauskas, Artūras (2016). "Čarneckis Valdemaras Vytautas" (PDF). In Bitautas, Algis; Svarauskas, Artūras; Tamošaitis, Mindaugas (eds.). Lietuvos Respublikos 1918–1940 m. vyriausybių ministrų biografinis žodynas (in Lithuanian). Mokslo ir enciklopedijų leidybos centras. pp. 113–116. ISBN 978-5-420-01778-4.
- Veilentienė, Audronė (1999). "Valdemaras Vytautas Čarneckis ir Lietuvos užsienio politikos problemos (1924 06 18–1925 09 25)". In Česonis, Alfonsas (ed.). Lietuvos užsienio reikalų ministrai: 1918–1940 (in Lithuanian). Kaunas: Šviesa. pp. 127–151. ISBN 5-430-02696-4.
- Veilentienė, Audronė (2006). "Čarneckis Valdemaras Vytautas". In Ragauskas, Aivas; Tamošaitis, Mindaugas (eds.). Lietuvos Steigiamojo Seimo (1920–1922 metų) narių biografinis žodynas. Didysis Lietuvos parlamentarų biografinis žodynas (in Lithuanian). Vol. 2. Vilnius: Vilniaus pedagoginis universitetas. pp. 119–121. ISBN 9789955201465.
- Veilentienė, Audronė (2012). "Valdemaras Vytautas Čarneckis: kelias į Steigiamąjį Seimą ir diplomatinio darbo pradžia". Parlamento studijos (in Lithuanian). 13. ISSN 1648-9896.
- Veilentienė, Audronė (2015). "Valdemaras Vytautas Čarneckis: tarp diplomatijos ir politikos". Istorija (in Lithuanian). 100: 17–69. doi:10.15823/istorija.2015.20. ISSN 1392-0456.
- Žalys, Vytautas (2007). Lietuvos diplomatijos istorija (1925–1940) (in Lithuanian). Vol. I. Vilnius: Versus aureus. ISBN 978-9955-699-50-7.
- Žygelis, Dalius; Tekorius, Andrius (2014). "Plk. ltn. Juozas Papečkys: Lietuvos karo teisės patriarchas" (PDF). Kardas (in Lithuanian). 2 (462): 2–9. ISSN 1392-9437.
