= Vytautas Petrulis =

Lithuanian politician (1890–1941)

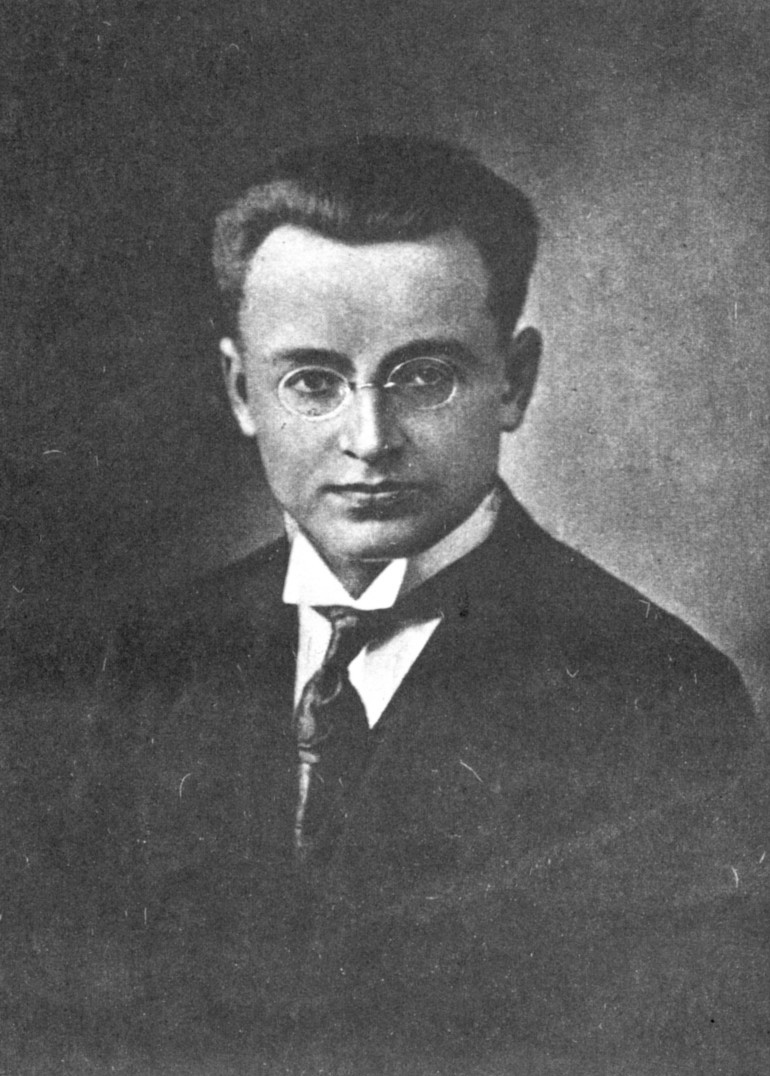

Prime Minister of Lithuania
- In office 4 February 1925 – 19 September 1925
- President: Aleksandras Stulginskis
- Preceded by: Antanas Tumėnas
- Succeeded by: Leonas Bistras

Minister of Finance of Lithuania
- In office 21 August 1922 – 19 September 1925
- Prime Minister: Ernestas Galvanauskas; Antanas Tumėnas
- Preceded by: Jonas Dobkevičius
- Succeeded by: Petras Karvelis

Personal details
- Born: 3 February 1890 Kateliškiai, Kovno Governorate, Russian Empire
- Died: 3 December 1941 (aged 51) Near Ukhta, Komi ASSR, Soviet Union
- Cause of death: Executed by the NKVD
- Party: Party of National Progress; Lithuanian Christian Democratic Party
- Relatives: Alfonsas Petrulis (brother)
- Education: Moscow Commercial Institute

Vytautas Petrulis (3 February 1890 – 3 December 1941) was a Lithuanian banker and politician. He was the minister of finance (1922–1925), prime minister (1925), and speaker of the Seimas (1925–1926). He is often nicknamed "the father of the litas" as it was during his term as minister of finance that the Lithuanian litas was introduced.

Educated at the Moscow Commercial Institute, Petrulis returned to Lithuania in March 1918 and worked to establish the Trade and Industry Bank and its branch in Klaipėda. He became a member of the Council of Lithuania in November 1918. He was the acting minister of finance in March–April 1920 and minister of finance from August 1922 to September 1925 in five different Cabinets of Lithuania. He worked to introduce the Lithuanian litas, normalize state budget, and reform taxes and import duties.

He became the prime minister of Lithuania in February 1925. At the start of his tenure, the Concordat of 1925 was concluded between the Holy See and the Second Republic of Poland causing a diplomatic crisis between Lithuania and the Holy See. Petrulis opened negotiations with Poland regarding regarding timber transport via the Neman River, but even such limited negotiations proved to be highly unpopular due to the ongoing territorial dispute over Vilnius Region. He was forced to resign in September 1925, but became the speaker of the Seimas on the same day.

Accused of corruption, Petrulis resigned from the speakership in February 1926 and withdrew from politics. He spent his time running a 103-hectare (250-acre) farm near Kaunas that produced milk. The corruption allegations were investigated and the Supreme Tribunal of Lithuania heard his case in May 1932. He was found guilty of appropriating government's funds and sentenced to two years in prison. However, he received a pardon after serving just 1.5 months.

On 30 July 1940, he was arrested by the NKVD and sentenced to eight years in prison. However, the Supreme Court of the Komi ASSR sentenced him to death in September 1941 for anti-Soviet agitation. Petrulis was executed near Ukhta.

== Biography ==
=== Early life and education ===
Vytautas Petrulis was born on 3 February 1890 in Kateliškiai near Vabalninkas which was then part of the Russian Empire. His parents were Lithuanian farmers who owned 27 hectares (67 acres) of land. Petrulis had four siblings – two sisters and two brothers. His elder brother Alfonsas Petrulis was a Roman Catholic priest and supported his education.

Petrulis attended a Russian primary school in Kupiškis. He then enrolled at the Jelgava Gymnasium, however he was expelled during his last year for anti-Tsarist activities. He passed graduation exams by mail and chose to enroll at the Moscow Commercial Institute around 1910. In Moscow, he was an active member of the Lithuanian society to provide aid to students at Moscow universities. He also joined the Lithuanian Scientific Society in 1910. He graduated in 1916.

At the outbreak of World War I, Petrulis was touring Suvalkija on foot with the future Lithuanian writers Ignas Šeinius, Faustas Kirša, and Adomas Lastas. Petrulis managed to return to Moscow where he joined the Lithuanian Society for the Relief of War Sufferers. After the February Revolution, he joined the Democratic National Freedom League (known as Santara), was its treasurer, and helped publish its newspaper Santara. In June 1917, he attended the Petrograd Seimas where he supported the idea of autonomous Lithuania within Russia (as opposed to the full independence).

In November 1917, Petrulis moved to Voronezh where he joined the Supreme Lithuanian Council in Russia. Voronezh hosted a number of Lithuanian schools and Petrulis delivered lectures to Lithuanian students who were members of the socialist organization Aušrininkai. He also organized bookkeeping courses. However, the new Bolshevik government began arresting Lithuanian activists in February 1918 and Petrulis decided to return to Lithuania.

=== Trade and Industry Bank ===
Petrulis returned to Lithuania in March 1918. He briefly worked at the editorial offices of Lietuvos aidas.

Petrulis worked on organizing the Trade and Industry Bank and was elected to its first board in December 1919. The bank performed some treasury functions while the state treasury was being set up. In spring 1920, Petrulis moved to Klaipėda, then a mandate of the League of Nations, to set up a local branch of the Trade and Industry Bank. The branch borrowed money from German banks. For bank's premises, he purchased a former hotel. He worked at the branch until he became the minister of finance in August 1922.

Additionally, Petrulis became with several companies financed by the Trade and Industry Bank, including the coal trading company Kuras (was a member of its board).

=== Council of Lithuania ===
On 17 November 1918, Petrulis together with Liudas Noreika and Voldemaras Čarneckis was coopted by the Council of Lithuania. On 19 February 1919, he became chairman of the economics committee of the council. It was responsible for trade, industry, agriculture, communications. At the same time, he became secretary of the budget committee responsible for state budget, personnel, and finances.

Prime minister Mykolas Sleževičius feuded with the Council of Lithuania and resigned on 6 March 1919. After a week-long delay, the new cabinet was formed by Pranas Dovydaitis and Petrulis was selected as the administrator of the Ministry of Finance while minister Martynas Yčas was away at the Paris Peace Conference. Petrulis issued an order to prohibit the import and use of the so-called Kerenka banknotes (money of the Russian Provisional Government).

However, this cabinet was ineffective and lasted for only a month. Sleževičius returned as prime minister. Petrulis became secretary of the presidium of the Council of Lithuania on 12 April 1919, but it was inactive until Sleževičius' resignation in October 1919. The council was replaced by the Constituent Assembly of Lithuania in May 1920.

Additionally, in September 1919, Petrulis became the first director of the newly established Department of General Statistics (Bendrosios statistikos departamentas), the first statics agency in Lithuania.

=== Political parties ===
Petrulis joined the Party of National Progress and worked to launch its newspaper Tauta in November 1919. He was the editor of the first seven issues. However, in the April 1920 election to the Constituent Assembly of Lithuania, he ran as a member of a nonpartisan group in the electoral district of Panevėžys where he was listed second after the prime minister Ernestas Galvanauskas. However, the list received only 835 votes.

Around 1922, Petrulis became a member of the Farmers' Association which was affiliated with the Lithuanian Christian Democratic Party. On the association's ticket, he was elected in the May 1923 election to the Second Seimas.

=== Ministry of Finance ===
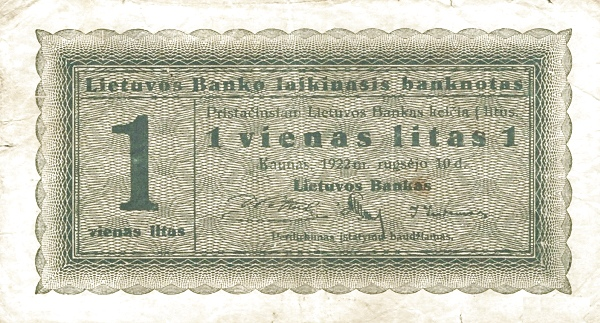
Temporary banknote of 1 litas printed in Berlin (October 1922)

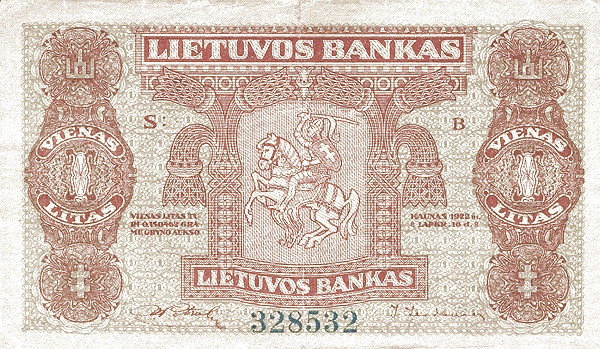
Permanent banknote of 1 litas printed in Prague (November 1922) with signature of Petrulis. His signature was not printed on banknotes of higher denomination.

Finance minister Jonas Dobkevičius resigned on 21 August 1922. He resisted the introduction of the Lithuanian litas and was implicated in a scandal of selling government's shares in the Trade and Industry Bank at below market rates to its chairman Martynas Yčas.

Prime minister Ernestas Galvanauskas then invited Petrulis to become the minister as he supported the Lithuanian litas. Laws on the litas and the bank of issue were already prepared. Therefore, Petrulis worked on the implementation – establishment of the Bank of Lithuania, instructions for currency exchanges, production of the banknotes. The contract for printing the banknotes was signed with the printing shop of Andreas Haase in Prague on 28 August, but it could produce the banknotes only in mid-November 1922. Officially, Lithuania used the Lithuanian auksinas (renamed German ostmark) which was subject to the same hyperinflation of the papiermark. Therefore, time was of the essence and Petrulis traveled to Berlin where the printing shop of Otto Elsner produced temporary banknotes in three weeks. The Bank of Lithuania was officially established on 27 September and litas was introduced on 2 October 1922. Further, under Petrulis' leadership, litas coins were introduced in February 1925.

Petrulis pushed to normalize Lithuania's budget and prepare it in early fall. The 1923 budget was presented only in July 1923; the 1924 budget was adopted in late December 1923; the 1925 budget was prepared timely and even published as a separate booklet in October 1924. Petrulis prepared a law on the budget process, but it was not adopted by the Seimas. According to his contemporaries, he could recite budget lines from memory.

Petrulis also worked on reorganizing taxes and custom duties. In early 1924, Lithuania switched from ad valorem to specific rate duty system. However, Lithuania lacked trained customs officials both to draft appropriate laws and to implement them in practice. To encourage foreign trade, Lithuania abolished export licenses. However, Lithuania had protectionist policies prohibiting import of certain goods, such as wheat, fish, matchsticks. Petrulis frequently signed one-time exemptions from such prohibitions which brought about accusations that he was taking bribes for such exemptions.

Petrulis worked on organizing the Chamber of Trade and Industry which opened in June 1925. Petrulis also worked on the establishment of the Chamber of Agriculture of Lithuania though it was accomplished after his departure from the government.

=== Prime minister ===
On 4 February 1925, Petrulis replaced Antanas Tumėnas as the prime minister while remaining minister of finance. Most other ministers remained the same, with the exception of the minister of education and minister of internal affairs. At the time, there were internal tensions within the Lithuanian Christian Democratic Party. Tumėnas represented the more conservative wing within the party, while Mykolas Krupavičius led the more radical wing. Krupavičius was considered for the prime minister post, but Petrulis won as a compromise candidate. Overall, Petrulis was considered to be a young, energetic but pragmatic politician not afraid of reforms or taking risks. According to a report by the British consul G. W. Berry, Petrulis owed his position to the banker Jonas Vailokaitis who wanted to normalize the foreign relations with the Second Polish Republic as it was hurting the economy.

Petrulis' tenure started with the Concordat of 10 February 1925 by which the Holy See reorganized the Diocese of Vilnius, thereby acknowledging Poland's claims to the city despite Lithuanian requests to govern the province directly from Rome. There were no diplomatic relations between Lithuania and Poland over Vilnius Region which was controlled by Poland but claimed by Lithuania. Lithuanians submitted a protest to the Holy See and recalled its representative there; the Holy See responded in kind and all diplomatic relations between Lithuania and the Holy See were terminated.

Petrulis attempted to open negotiations with Poland, but strictly limited to the issue of transporting timber via the Neman River. Lack of economic activity caused complaints from merchants in the Klaipėda Region that Lithuania gained in 1923. Thus, it was both economic and political issue for Lithuania. Petrulis secretly met the Polish representative Juliusz Łukasiewicz in Berlin on 5 January 1925 (i.e. even before Petrulis became the prime minister) and in principle agreed to make efforts to normalize the relations. Petrulis secretly met with Łukasiewicz again in July 1925 in East Prussia.

It was agreed to open negotiations in Copenhagen on 30 August 1925. Notably, these negotiations were the results of Petrulis' efforts while the minister of foreign affairs Voldemaras Čarneckis was sidelined. The negotiations were led by Vaclovas Sidzikauskas on the Lithuanian side and by Leon Wasilewski on the Polish side. On 15 September 1925, Sidzikauskas signed a protocol ending the first round of negotiations which agreed to allow communications (telephone, telegram, postal service) but only for the purpose of timber transport. However, even such limited agreement proved to be highly unpopular in Lithuania and Petrulis was forced to submit his resignation on 19 September 1925.

The resignation was effective on 25 September, but on the same day Petrulis became speaker of the Seimas. He officially resigned on 9 February 1926 due to the allegations of corruption. He chaired only 19 sessions of the Seimas. The other sessions were chaired by deputy speakers Justinas Staugaitis and Pranas Viktoras Raulinaitis.

=== Corruption trial ===
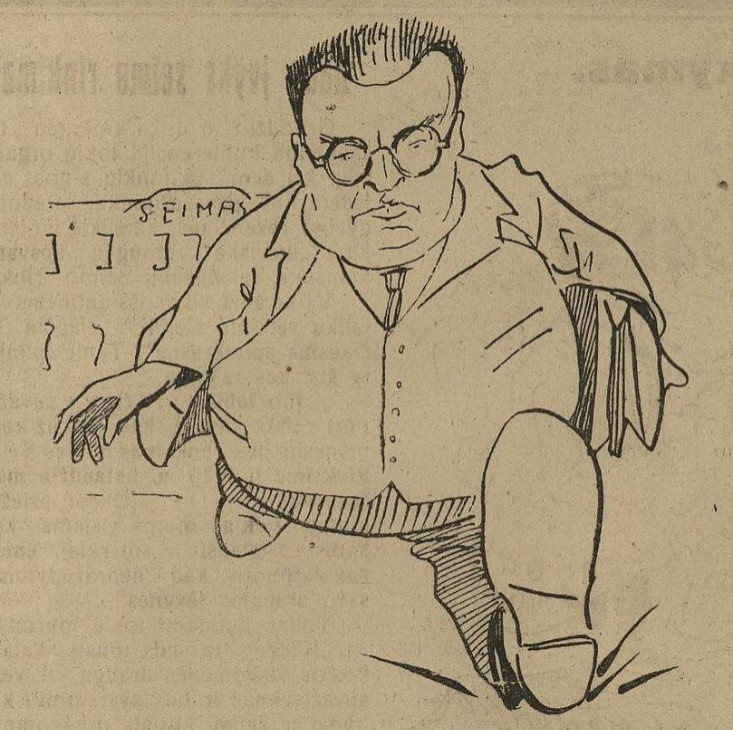
Caricature of Petrulis published in Lietuvos žinios in December 1925 shows him running away from the Seimas. It was followed by a short poem accusing him of stealing millions. Petrulis, represented by attorney Vladas Stašinskas, sued the newspaper for defamation.

In late 1925, Petrulis was accused of on several counts. He was accused of taking bribes for approving import exemptions. In August 1925, he approved a 2 million litas loan from the Bank of Lithuania to the Trade and Industry Bank (his former employer) but the funds were lost in currency speculation. While Petrulis recovered his personal funds from the bank, the Trade and Industry Bank declared bankruptcy in 1927. In 1924, the Ministry of Finance lent 150,000 litas to the National Lithuanian Bank in Klaipėda. The loan was repaid, but the interest was deposited in Petrulis' personal account. Petrulis also renewed contract for alcohol monopoly without adjusting prices that had decreased since the contract was first signed.

The Supreme Tribunal of Lithuania tried the case in May 1932. Petrulis was represented by attorneys Vladas Stanka and Antanas Tumėnas. The case had some 70 witnesses, including the former prime ministers Augustinas Voldemaras and Ernestas Galvanauskas, and was conducted behind closed doors. The court reviewed 81 import exemptions and found that Petrulis had valid and consistent reasons for approving them. It could not find enough evidence to prove corruption when making the loan to the Trade and Industry Bank. It did find Petrulis guilty of depositing government's interest to his personal account and for causing financial losses to the government by renewing the alcohol contract. The tribunal sentenced Petrulis to two years in prison, reduced to 1.5 years according to the 1928 amnesty law. Additionally, he was ordered to pay 97,709 litas in restitution for the alcohol contract, but nothing for the misappropriated interest.

Petrulis sold about 20 hectares (49 acres) of land that he owned near Kaunas to raise funds for the restitution. According to press reports, by November 1932, he paid back nearly 40,000 litas. He entered Kaunas Prison on 2 December 1932. After serving a month and a half, president Antanas Smetona approved his pardon.

Additionally, persistent rumors accused Petrulis of profiting from the production of silver litas coins. Based on recommendations from the Royal Mint, Petrulis reduced silver purity to 50%. According to rumors, Petrulis then stole the remaining silver. There were also rumors that Petrulis took substantial bribes when selecting the Royal Mint as the producer of the coins – its proposal was not the cheapest. Researcher Eduardas Remecas argues that the law and the request for proposals was rigged to ensure that only the Royal Mint would meet the technical requirements. These rumors were investigated by a special commission which found them untrue.

=== Farm owner ===
After leaving the government, Petrulis withdrew from public life. In 1926, he purchased Julijanava folwark with about 103 hectares (250 acres) of land near the II Fort of the Kaunas Fortress. He reconstructed farm buildings, installed electricity, and launched a farm that mainly produced milk. In late 1930s, the farm had 35 cows, nine horses, eight year-round and ten seasonal workers. He wrote a book on agriculture, but its manuscript was lost after his arrest by the Soviets. He refused a teaching position at the Agricultural Academy in Dotnuva.

He maintained contacts with the composer Stasys Šimkus, businessman Martynas Yčas, poet Faustas Kirša, but avoided closer contacts with former political associates. Only in 1938, he established an export company Prekyba and worked with a commission drafting statutes of the new Industry Bank.

=== Soviet persecution ===
Lithuania was occupied by the Soviet Union on 15 June 1940. On 29 July 1940, Antanas Sniečkus signed the order to arrest Petrulis and he was arrested by the NKVD the following day and held in Kaunas Prison. He was accused of belonging to the "counter-revolutionary" Farmers' Association and that "he, as a member of the counter-revolutionary government, led an active struggle for the suppression of the revolutionary movement and the liquidation of the Communist Party of Lithuania." The Special Council of the NKVD sentenced him to eight years in prison according to the Article 58.

In March 1941, Petrulis was transported to Ukhtizhemlag near Ukhta. There, he was tried again by the Supreme Court of the Komi ASSR which found him guilty of anti-Soviet agitation and propaganda on 6 September 1941 and sentenced him to death. He was executed on 3 December 1941. His burial place is unknown.

== Publications ==
Petrulis contributed articles to various Lithuanian periodicals. He helped establish and edit two party newspapers, Santara of the Democratic National Freedom League and Tauta of the Party of National Progress. He also briefly worked at Lietuvos aidas, the official newspaper of the Council of Lithuania. He supported the publication of the literary magazines Pradai ir žygiai, Gairės, Barai.

He published articles on economic and financial issues in Tauta, Mūsų ūkis, Lietuvos ūkis, Rytas, Lietuva and on geopolitical issues in the magazine Naujoji Romuva.

== Bibliography ==
- Akmenytė-Ruzgienė, Vilma (27 January 2025). "Petrulis Vytautas (1890–1941)". Seimas Lietuvos Respublikoje (1920–1940 m.) (in Lithuanian). Lietuvos Respublikos Seimo kanceliarija.
- "V. Petrulis valsybės iždui moka pinigus" (PDF). Argentinos lietuvių balsas (in Lithuanian). Vol. 119. 27 November 1932.
- Blažytė, Danutė (1997). "Vytautas Petrulis". In Speciūnas, Vytautas (ed.). Lietuvos Respublikos ministrai pirmininkai (1918–1940) (in Lithuanian). Vilnius: Alma littera. ISBN 9986-02-379-3.
- Blažytė-Baužienė, Danutė (2007). "Vytautas Petrulis". In Ragauskas, Aivas; Tamošaitis, Mindaugas (eds.). Lietuvos Respublikos Seimų I (1922–1923), II (1923–1926), III (1926–1927), IV (1936–1940) narių biografinis žodynas. Didysis Lietuvos parlamentarų biografinis žodynas (in Lithuanian). Vol. 3. Vilniaus pedagoginis universitetas. pp. 399–406. ISBN 978-9955-20-345-2.
- Jencius-Butautas, Viktoras (March 2022). "Donato Malinausko ir Vytauto Petrulio nuopelnai spausdinant pirmuosius litus Prahoje" (PDF). Voruta (in Lithuanian). 1 (875). ISSN 1392-0677.
- Katilius, Algimantas (2017). Vasario 16-osios Akto signataras kunigas Alfonsas Petrulis (in Lithuanian). Vilnius: Lietuvos nacionalinis muziejus. ISBN 978-609-478-001-1.
- "Įstatymas apie rusų popierinius pinigus". Laikinosios vyriausybės žinios (in Lithuanian). Vol. 5. 4 April 1919.
- "Į Steigiamąjį Seimą. V. Rinkimų Apygardos kandidatų sąrašas". Lietuva (in Lithuanian). Vol. 78, no. 360. 9 April 1920. pp. 1–2.
- Maksimaitis, Mindaugas (2011). Mažoji konstituanta: Lietuvos taryba atkuriant valstybingumą (in Lithuanian). Justitia. ISBN 978-9955-616-65-8.
- Martišius, Stanislovas Algimantas (2009). "Tarpukario Lietuvos statistika ir jos kūrėjai". Lietuvos statistikos darbai (in Lithuanian). 48 (1): 4–14. doi:10.15388/LJS.2009.13952.
- Lietuvos statistikos metraštis 1924–1926 m. (in Lithuanian). Vol. I. Kaunas: Valstybės spaustuvė. 1927. pp. 80–83.
- "Feljetonui medžiaga: Pirmoji karikatūros byla". Lietuvos žinios (in Lithuanian). Vol. 15. 20 January 1926.
- "Vytauto Petrulio apkaltinimo motyvai". Lietuvos žinios (in Lithuanian). Vol. 129, no. 3921. 9 June 1932.
- Pruskus, Valdas (2013). "Tarpukario Lietuvos milijonieriai: praturtėjimo būdai ir jų ypatumai nūdienos realijų kontekste". Mokslo ir technikos raida (in Lithuanian). 5 (1): 34–41. ISSN 2029-2430.
- Remecas, Eduardas (2015). "1925 m. laidos Lietuvos Respublikos monetų kūrimo ir kaldinimo problematika". Pinigų studijos (in Lithuanian). 2: 48–62. ISSN 1392-2637.
- "P. V. Petrulio byla Vyr. Tribunole". Rytas (in Lithuanian). Vol. 88, no. 2364. 11 May 1932.
- "V. Petrulis jau atlieka bausmę. Kalėjime p. Petrulis apsiverkė" (PDF). Sandara (in Lithuanian). Vol. 51. 16 December 1932.
- Surblys, Alvydas (2006). "Martyno Yčo ekonominės veiklos Kaune pėdsakais". Kauno istorijos metraštis (in Lithuanian). 7: 111–136. ISSN 2335-8734.
- Tamošaitis, Mindaugas; Bitautas, Algis; Svarauskas, Artūras, eds. (2016). Lietuvos Respublikos 1918–1940 m. vyriausybių ministrų biografinis žodynas (in Lithuanian). Vilnius: Mokslo ir enciklopedijų leidybos centras. pp. 465–467. ISBN 978-5-420-01778-4.
- Terleckas, Vladas (1997). Lietuvos bankas 1922–1943 metais: kūrimo ir veiklos studija (PDF) (in Lithuanian). Vilnius: Lietuvos bankas. ISBN 978-609-8204-04-9.
- Terleckas, Vladas (1999). "Pirmasis nacionalinis komercinis bankas" (PDF). Pinigų studijos (in Lithuanian). 1: 56–62.
- Terleckas, Vladas (2001). Lietuvos bankininkai: gyvenimų ir darbų pėdsakai (in Lithuanian). Vilnius: Lietuvos bankas. ISBN 9986651271.
- Žalys, Vytautas (2007). Lietuvos diplomatijos istorija (1925–1940) (in Lithuanian). Vol. I. Vilnius: Versus aureus. ISBN 978-9955-699-50-7.
- Zinkuvienė, Alia (2 October 2012). "Litui 90 metų! Ar sulauks 100?" (in Lithuanian). Respublika.
- Žiugžda, Juozas, ed. (1965). Lietuvos TSR istorija (in Lithuanian). Vol. 3. Valstybinė politinės ir mokslinės literatūros leidykla.
- Žostautaitė, Petronėlė (1986). Lietuvos TSR Mokslų Akademijos darbai. A serija (in Lithuanian). Vol. 3.

Preceded by Antanas Tumėnas	Prime Minister of Lithuania; 4 February 1925 – 25 September 1925	Succeeded by Leonas Bistras
