= Jonas Šimkus =

Lithuanian chemist and statesman

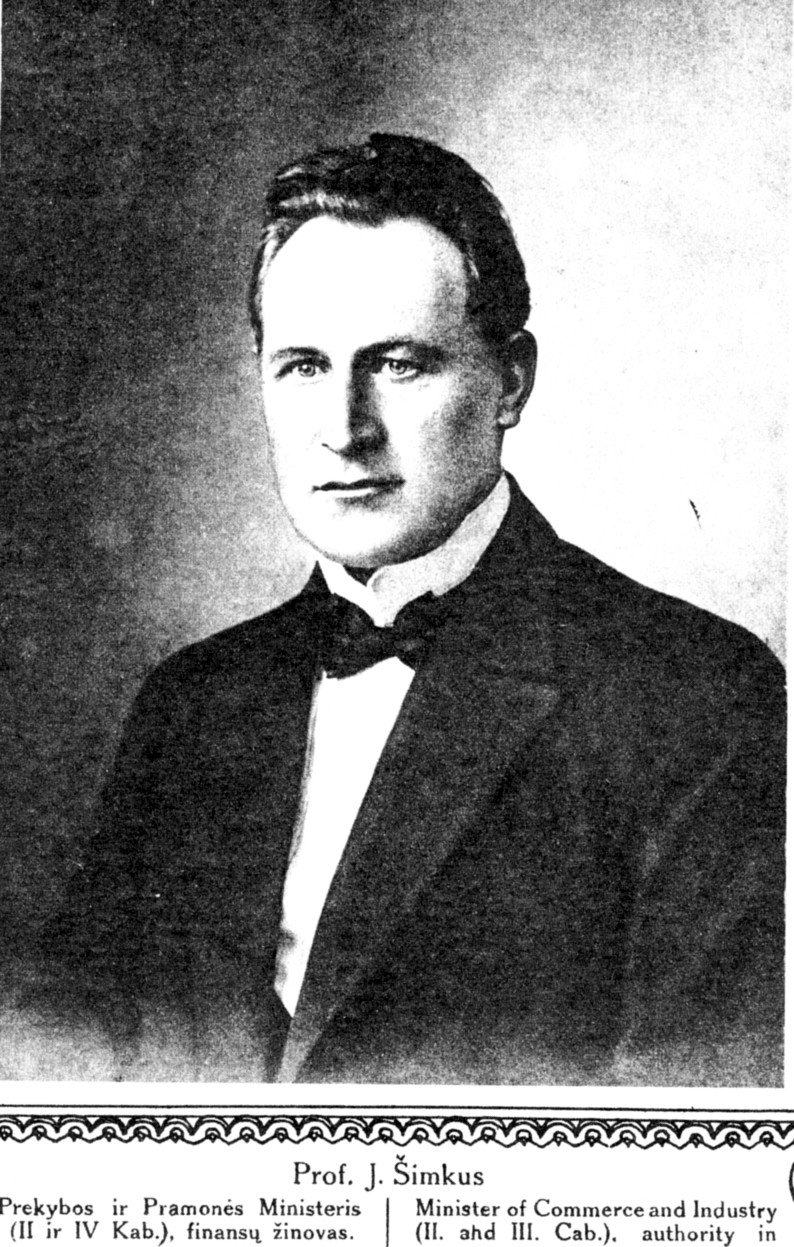
- Born: 25 April 1873; Sūrupis, Russian Empire
- Died: 4 June 1944 (aged 71); Maironiškiai, Lithuania
- Resting place: Petrašiūnai Cemetery
- Education: Imperial Moscow University (1900); University of Geneva (1906)
- Occupations: Statesman; professor; chemist

Jonas Šimkus (25 April 1873 – 4 June 1944) was a Lithuanian chemist, academic, and statesman. He served as the Minister of Trade and Industry (1918–1919) and Minister of National Defence (1921–1922), and was the first rector of the University of Lithuania (1922–1923). He ltaught at the university, heading the Department of Chemical Technology until 1940. He served as Lithuania’s honorary consul of Norway (1926–1940).

== Biography ==
He studied in Telšiai, at the Palanga Progymnasium, and the Šiauliai Gymnasium, and graduated from the Liepāja Gymnasium. In 1900, he graduated from the Faculty of Chemistry at the Imperial Moscow University and in 1903, he received a master’s degree in chemistry. In 1906, he studied at the University of Geneva (Switzerland), earning a master’s degree in pharmacy.

From 1904 to 1905, he taught at Kazan University; from 1906 to 1916, he was a docent and associate professor at the Imperial Moscow University. While living in Moscow, he was active in Lithuanian social and cultural organizations. As a student he took part in the clandestine Lithuanian students’ society in Moscow, distributing Varpas and other Lithuanian publications banned during the Lithuanian press ban.

He returned to Lithuania in 1918. From 26 December 1918 to 12 March 1919, he served as the Minister of Trade and Industry in Mykolas Sleževičius’s second cabinet, and from 12 April to 7 October 1919 in the fourth cabinet. From 11 April 1921 to 2 February 1922, he was Minister of National Defence in Kazys Grinius’s sixth cabinet, succeeding Konstantinas Žukas. He was invited into the cabinets as a non-partisan member.

From 16 February 1922, he was an ordinary (full) professor at the University of Lithuania and its first rector until 1923. He taught at the university until 1940, and for many years headed the Department of Chemical Technology.

He was one of the founders of the company Varpas. From 1924, he chaired the Lithuanian–Latvian Society. In 1926–1940, he served as an honorary consul of Norway. He helped found the Lithuanian Society for Psychotechnics and Vocational Guidance in 1931; the Lithuanian Scientific Management Society in 1938; the International Bank in 1926; and he was among the organizers of the Lithuanian Entrepreneurs’ Movement. He contributed to the journals Lietuvos ūkis, Technika ir ūkis, and Lietuva. He published several books. He was buried in the Petrašiūnai Cemetery in Kaunas.

In 2003, on his 130th birth anniversary, an auditorium named for Prof. J. Šimkus was opened at Vytautas Magnus University.

== Bibliography ==
- Chemical Technology
- Composition of Public Water Supply in the City of Kaunas
- Work Organization
- Theories and Systems of Wage Payment and Labor Productivity
- Chemical Warfare
- Rubber: Its Production and Use
