= Liudas Noreika =

Lithuanian politician (1884–1928)

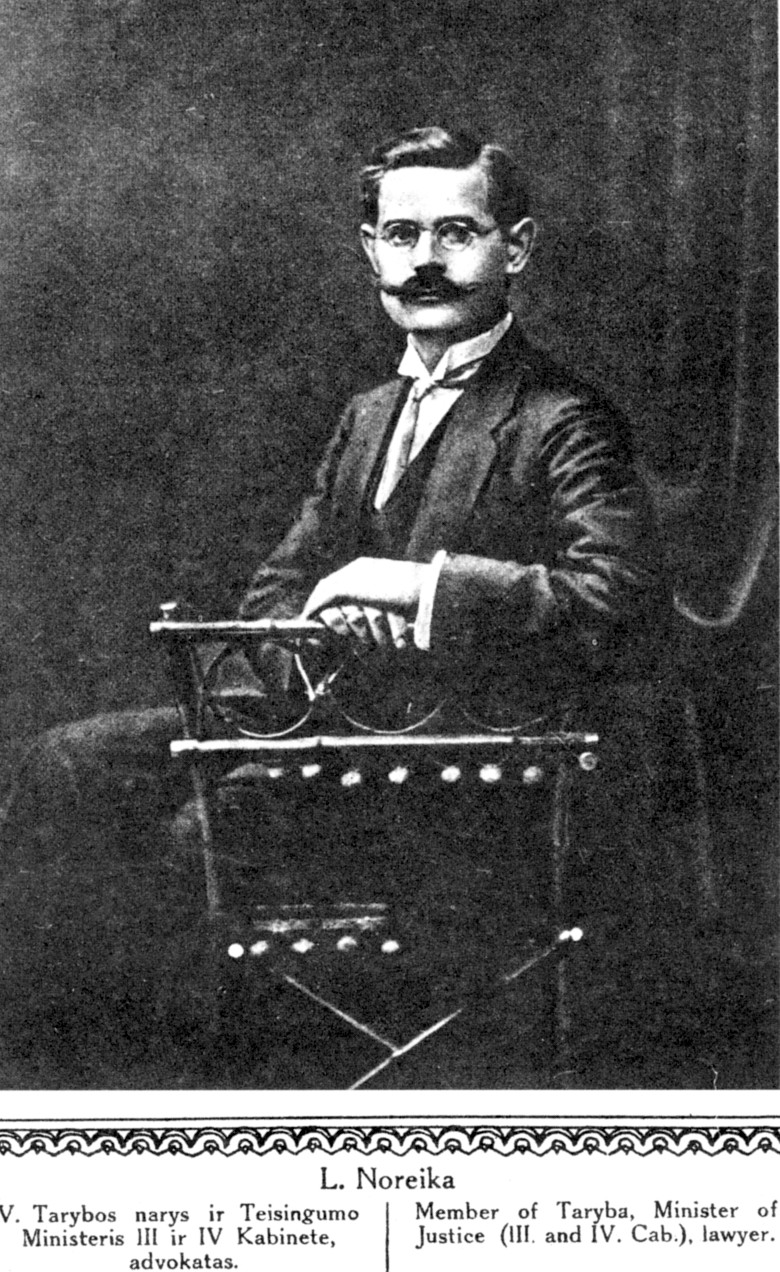
- Noreika in Lithuania Album (1921)

Minister of Justice
- In office 12 March 1919 – 15 June 1920
- Prime Minister: Pranas Dovydaitis; Mykolas Sleževičius; Ernestas Galvanauskas
- Preceded by: Petras Leonas
- Succeeded by: Vincas Karoblis

Personal details
- Born: 19 August 1884 Pasruojė, Russian Empire
- Died: 30 May 1928 (aged 43) Kaunas, Lithuania
- Cause of death: Shooting
- Party: Party of National Progress; Lithuanian Nationalist Union
- Education: Kaunas Priest Seminary; Saint Petersburg Roman Catholic Theological Academy; Saint Petersburg University
- Occupation: Attorney, newspaper editor

Liudas Noreika (19 August 1884 – 30 May 1928) was a Lithuanian attorney, activist, and politician. He served as the Minister of Justice under three prime ministers in March 1919 – June 1920.

Noreika studied to become a Catholic priest, but lack of calling made him switch to studies of law at Saint Petersburg University. During World War I, he worked with the Lithuanian Society for the Relief of War Sufferers to provide aid to Lithuanian war refugees and was politically active in the Party of National Progress. He was one of the organizers of the Petrograd Seimas in June 1917.

After his return to Lithuania, he was coopted into the Council of Lithuania in November 1918. He left government service in 1920, but continued to be actively involved with the Party of National Progress which merged to form the Lithuanian Nationalist Union in 1924. He was editor of many of the party's periodicals, including Vairas (1914–1915), Tauta (1920) and Lietuvis (1926). He was party's chairman from December 1926 to August 1927 and from February 1928 to his death in May 1928. He was shot and killed after a quarrel broke out while playing cards.

== Biography ==
=== Early life and education ===
Noreika was born on 19 August 1884 to a Lithuanian family of peasants in Pasruojė near Žemaičių Kalvarija and Alsėdžiai. After completing primary school in Alsėdžiai in 1897, he enrolled at the Palanga Progymnasium. As it was common for Lithuanian men at the time, he enrolled at the Kaunas Priest Seminary which he completed in 1905.

As a promising student, he was sent to study theology at the Saint Petersburg Roman Catholic Theological Academy. After three years, he received candidate degree in theology but was not ordained priest as he did not feel the calling. He briefly worked as a primary school teacher in Linkuva before enrolling at the Law Faculty of Saint Petersburg University in 1909. At first, he attended the university as an audit student and became a full student after passing gymnasium graduation exams in 1912. He completed his law courses in 1915, but finished the final exams only in 1917.

=== Russian Empire ===
In 1907, Noreika published his first articles in the Lithuanian press. In 1911, together with Juozas Balčikonis, Liudas Gira, Pranciškus Būčys, Adolfas Vėgėlė, he published Balsas, but only four issues appeared. He was a permanent correspondent of Viltis published by Antanas Smetona. He wrote mainly about the proceedings of the State Duma. When Smetona departed Viltis and established Vairas, Noreika became its deputy editor (1914–1915). He was the editor of Lietuvių balsas published by Martynas Yčas and the Lithuanian Society for the Relief of War Sufferers in Saint Petersburg (1916–1918) and the responsible editor of the Catholic Ateities spinduliai.

During World War I, Noreika was a member of the central committee of the Lithuanian Society for the Relief of War Sufferers in Saint Petersburg and Voronezh. He was a member of a committee tasked with issues of education (publishing of textbooks, establishing libraries, organizing lectures, etc.). He was also politically active. He was a co-founder and later chairman of the Party of National Progress. After the February Revolution, Noreika became secretary of the Council of the Lithuanian Nation which organized the Petrograd Seimas in June 1917. The seimas discussed post-war political future of Lithuania. Noreika and others from the Party of National Progress promoted the vision of full independence for Lithuanian (as opposed to autonomy within Russia). However, the seimas broke down due to disagreements. In November 1917, Noreika became secretary of the Supreme Lithuanian Council in Russia.

=== Independent Lithuania ===
==== Minister of Justice ====
Noreika returned to the German-occupied Lithuania in March 1918. He worked as editor of Lietuvos aidas and assisted the Council of Lithuania in formulating of the political ideology of the proposed Kingdom of Lithuania. On 27 November 1918, he was coopted into the Council of Lithuania. In February 1919, he became chairman of council's committee on general laws concerning internal affairs, security, justice, education.

On 11 November 1918, Augustinas Voldemaras formed the first government of Lithuania. Noreika became the vice-minister of finance. However, due to the outbreak of the Lithuanian–Soviet War, this government lasted just a month and a half. The Lithuanian government evacuated to Kaunas. On 12 March 1919, Noreika became the Minister of Justice in the third government formed by the Prime Minister Pranas Dovydaitis. He continued to serve as the minister under Prime Ministers Mykolas Sleževičius and Ernestas Galvanauskas until 15 June 1920. He was a member of a commission tasked with drafting the electoral law for the Constituent Assembly of Lithuania and chairman of the commission drafting the Third Temporary Constitution of Lithuania.

==== Nationalist Union ====
After leaving the government, Noreika started a private attorney practice and continued to be involved in public life. In summer 1920, he was elected to the city council of Kaunas. In 1921, together with Juozas Pajaujis-Javis, he translated and published a book on modern history by Wincenty Zakrzewski. In 1922, he became one of the co-founders and first treasurer of the Lithuanian Catholic Academy of Science.

He continued to be involved with the activities of the Party of National Progress which merged to form the Lithuanian Nationalist Union in 1924. He was editor of the party's periodicals Tauta (1920) and Lietuvis (1926) as well as a co-founder of the publishing house Pažanga (1928). He was elected chairman of the Nationalist Union after the December 1926 coup d'état (he replaced Antanas Smetona who became the President of Lithuania). He held the post until 4 August 1927, and then again from 1 February 1928 to his death on 30 May 1928.

Noreika was shot five times by artillery captain Vladimiras Okulič-Kazarinas at 4 a.m. on 29 May 1928. They played cards at Merkurijus club on Laisvės alėja and had a quarrel. Noreika died in hospital at 6 p.m. the following day. Okulič-Kazarinas was sentenced to three years in prison.
