= Prime Minister of Lithuania =

Head of government

- Lietuvos Respublikos Ministras Pirmininkas
- Coat of arms of Lithuania

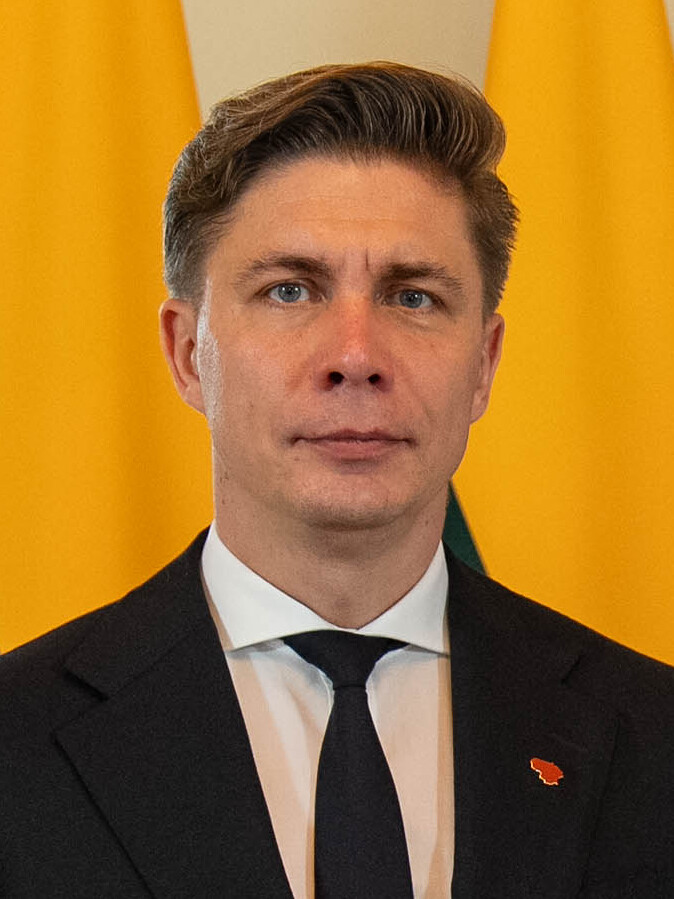
- Incumbent; Mindaugas Sinkevičius since 14 July 2026
- Government of Lithuania
- Style: Mister/Madam Prime Minister (informal); His/Her Excellency (diplomatic)
- Type: Head of government
- Appointer: President with the assent of the Seimas
- Term length: 4 years; No term limit
- Formation: 11 November 1918; 107 years ago
- First holder: Augustinas Voldemaras
- Abolished: 1940–1991
- Deputy: Minister of Finance
- Salary: €8,800 per month plus paid expenses.
- Website: Official website

The prime minister of Lithuania (Lithuanian: Ministras Pirmininkas, lit. 'Minister-Chairman', colloquially also referred to as the premier Lithuanian: premjeras) is the head of government of Lithuania. The prime minister is appointed by the president with the assent of the Lithuanian parliament, the Seimas. The modern office of prime minister was established in 1990, when Lithuania declared its independence, although the official title was "Chairperson of the Council of Ministers" until 25 November 1992. The opposite to the Prime minister is the Leader of the Opposition.

Historically, the title of prime minister was also used between 1918 and 1940. This was during the original Republic of Lithuania, which lasted from the collapse of the Russian Empire until the country's annexation by the Soviet Union.

== List ==
=== Lithuanian Provisional Governing Commission (1812) ===
No.	Portrait	Name (Birth–Death)	Term of office			Political party	Government
No.	Portrait	Name (Birth–Death)	Took office	Left office	Time in office	Political party	Government
1		Józef Sierakowski (1765–1831); Acting	1 July 1812	18 July 1812	17 days	Independent	Sierakowski
2		Stanisław Sołtan (1756–1836); 1st time	18 July 1812	24 August 1812	36 days	Independent	Sołtan I
3		Dirk van Hogendorp (1761–1822)	24 August 1812	29 September 1812	36 days	Independent	Hogendorp
4		Stanisław Sołtan (1756–1836); 2nd time	29 September 1812	14 December 1812 (de facto) July 1813 (de jure)	76 days (de facto) 10 months (de jure)	Independent	Sołtan II

=== Republic of Lithuania (1918–1940) ===
No.	Portrait	Name (Birth–Death)	Term of office			Political party	Government
No.	Portrait	Name (Birth–Death)	Took office	Left office	Time in office	Political party	Government
1		Augustinas Voldemaras (1883–1942); 1st time	11 November 1918	26 December 1918	45 days	Party of National Progress	Voldemaras I
2		Mykolas Sleževičius (1882–1939); 1st time	26 December 1918	5 March 1919	69 days	Peasant Union	Sleževičius I
3		Pranas Dovydaitis (1886–1942)	13 March 1919	12 April 1919	38 days	Lithuanian Christian Democratic Party	Dovydaitis
(2)		Mykolas Sleževičius (1882–1939); 2nd time	12 April 1919	2 October 1919	173 days	Peasant Union	Sleževičius II
4		Ernestas Galvanauskas (1882–1967); 1st time	7 October 1919	15 June 1920	252 days	Independent	Galvanauskas I
5		Kazys Grinius (1866–1950)	19 June 1920	18 January 1922	1 year, 213 days	Lithuanian Popular Peasants' Union	Grinius
(4)		Ernestas Galvanauskas (1882–1967); 2nd time	2 February 1922	17 June 1924	2 years, 136 days	Independent	Galvanauskas II–III–IV
6		Antanas Tumėnas (1880–1946)	18 June 1924	27 January 1925	223 days	Lithuanian Christian Democratic Party	Tumėnas
7		Vytautas Petrulis (1890–1942)	4 February 1925	19 September 1925	227 days	Farmers' Association	Petrulis
8		Leonas Bistras (1890–1971)	25 September 1925	31 May 1926	248 days	Lithuanian Christian Democratic Party	Bistras
(2)		Mykolas Sleževičius (1882–1939); 3rd time	15 June 1926	17 December 1926	185 days	Lithuanian Popular Peasants' Union	Sleževičius III
(1)		Augustinas Voldemaras (1883–1942); 2nd time	17 December 1926	19 September 1929	2 years, 276 days	Lithuanian Nationalist Union	Voldemaras II
9		Juozas Tūbelis (1882–1939)	23 September 1929	24 March 1938	8 years, 182 days	Lithuanian Nationalist Union	Tūbelis I–II–III
10		Vladas Mironas (1880–1953)	24 March 1938	28 March 1939	1 year, 4 days	Lithuanian Nationalist Union	Mironas I–II
11		Jonas Černius (1898–1977)	28 March 1939	21 November 1939	238 days	Lithuanian Nationalist Union	Černius
12		Antanas Merkys (1887–1955)	21 November 1939	15 June 1940	207 days	Lithuanian Nationalist Union	Merkys

Following the ultimatum in June 1940, the forces of Soviet Union entered Lithuania, prompting President Antanas Smetona to flee the country. Antanas Merkys, who assumed the position of acting president in accordance with the constitution, soon announced he had taken over the Presidency on a permanent basis and appointed Justas Paleckis, favored by the Soviet authorities, as the Prime Minister ahead of the "people's government". Merkys soon resigned, allowing Paleckis to assume the post of acting president as well. The presidency of Merkys is not recognized as legitimate in modern Lithuania and Paleckis is not listed as an interwar Prime Minister in government sources.

No.	Portrait	Name (Birth–Death)	Term of office			Political party	Government
No.	Portrait	Name (Birth–Death)	Took office	Left office	Time in office	Political party	Government
–		Justas Paleckis (1899–1980)	17 June 1940	24 June 1940	7 days	Communist Party of Lithuania	
–		Vincas Krėvė-Mickevičius (1882–1954)	24 June 1940	1 July 1940	7 days	Communist Party of Lithuania	People's Government

=== Lithuanian Soviet Socialist Republic (1940–1990) ===
No.	Portrait	Name (Birth–Death)	Term of office			Political party
No.	Portrait	Name (Birth–Death)	Took office	Left office	Time in office	Political party
Chairman of the Council of People's Commissars of the Lithuanian SSR
1		Mečislovas Gedvilas (1901–1981) (in exile in the Russian SFSR 1941–1944)	25 August 1940	2 April 1946	5 years, 220 days	Communist Party of Lithuania
Chairmen of the Council of Ministers of the Lithuanian SSR
1		Mečislovas Gedvilas (1901–1981)	2 April 1946	16 January 1956	9 years, 289 days	Communist Party of Lithuania
2		Motiejus Šumauskas (1905–1982)	16 January 1956	14 April 1967	11 years, 88 days	Communist Party of Lithuania
3		Juozas Maniušis (1910–1987)	14 April 1967	16 January 1981	13 years, 277 days	Communist Party of Lithuania
4		Ringaudas Songaila (1929–2019)	16 January 1981	18 November 1985	4 years, 306 days	Communist Party of Lithuania
5		Vytautas Sakalauskas (1933–2001)	18 November 1985	17 March 1990	4 years, 119 days	Communist Party of Lithuania

=== Provisional Government of Lithuania (1941) ===
No.	Portrait	Name (Birth–Death)	Term of office			Government
No.	Portrait	Name (Birth–Death)	Took office	Left office	Time in office	Government
–		Juozas Ambrazevičius (1903–1974) acting	23 June 1941	5 August 1941	43 days	Provisional Government

=== Republic of Lithuania (1990–present) ===
From 11 March 1990 after adopting the Act of the Re-Establishment of the State of Lithuania.

Political parties and affiliations: Sąjūdis LDDP TS / TS-LKD LLS LSDP LVŽS

No.	Portrait	Name (Birth–Death)	Term of office			Political party	Government Coalition	Seimas
No.	Portrait	Name (Birth–Death)	Took office	Left office	Time in office	Political party	Government Coalition	Seimas
1		Kazimira Prunskienė (1943–2026)	17 March 1990	10 January 1991	299 days	Independent (endorsed by Sąjūdis)	Prunskienė; Sąjūdis	SC–RS (1990)
2		Albertas Šimėnas (born 1950)	10 January 1991	13 January 1991	3 days	Independent (endorsed by Sąjūdis)	Šimėnas; Sąjūdis	SC–RS (1990)
3		Gediminas Vagnorius (born 1957)	13 January 1991	21 July 1992	1 year, 190 days	Independent (endorsed by Sąjūdis)	Vagnorius I Sąjūdis	SC–RS (1990)
4		Aleksandras Abišala (born 1955)	21 July 1992	17 December 1992	149 days	Independent (endorsed by Sąjūdis)	Abišala; Sąjūdis	SC–RS (1990)
5		Bronislovas Lubys (1938–2011)	17 December 1992	31 March 1993	104 days	Independent (endorsed by LDDP)	Lubys; LDDP	6 (1992)
6		Adolfas Šleževičius (1948–2022)	31 March 1993	19 March 1996	2 years, 354 days	Democratic Labour Party (LDDP)	Šleževičius; LDDP	6 (1992)
7		Laurynas Stankevičius (1935–2017)	19 March 1996	10 December 1996	266 days	Democratic Labour Party (LDDP)	Stankevičius; LDDP	6 (1992)
(3)		Gediminas Vagnorius (born 1957)	10 December 1996	4 May 1999	2 years, 145 days	Homeland Union (TS)	Vagnorius II; TS–LKDP–LCS (1996–1998); TS–LKDP–LCS–LDDP (1998–1999)	7 (1996)
–		Irena Degutienė (born 1949) acting	4 May 1999	10 June 1999	37 days	Homeland Union (TS)	Vagnorius II; TS–LKDP–LCS–LDDP	7 (1996)
8		Rolandas Paksas (born 1956)	10 June 1999	27 October 1999	162 days	Homeland Union (TS)	Paksas I TS–LKDP–LCS	7 (1996)
–		Irena Degutienė (born 1949) acting	27 October 1999	11 November 1999	15 days	Homeland Union (TS)	Paksas I TS–LKDP–LCS	7 (1996)
9		Andrius Kubilius (born 1956)	11 November 1999	9 November 2000	364 days	Homeland Union (TS)	Kubilius I TS–LKDP	7 (1996)
(8)		Rolandas Paksas (born 1956)	9 November 2000	20 June 2001	223 days	Liberal Union (LLS)	Paksas II; LLS–NS–LCS–MKDS–LLRA	8 (2000)
–		Eugenijus Gentvilas (born 1960) acting	20 June 2001	12 July 2001	22 days	Liberal Union (LLS)	Paksas II; LLS-NS–LCS–MKDS–LLRA	8 (2000)
10		Algirdas Brazauskas (1932–2010)	12 July 2001	1 June 2006	4 years, 324 days	Social Democrats (LSDP)	Brazauskas I LSDP–NS	8 (2000)
10		Algirdas Brazauskas (1932–2010)	12 July 2001	1 June 2006	4 years, 324 days	Social Democrats (LSDP)	Brazauskas II; LSDP–DP–LVNDS–NS (2004–2006); LSDP–DP–LVNDS (2006)	9 (2004)
–		Zigmantas Balčytis (born 1953) acting	1 June 2006	18 July 2006	47 days	Social Democrats (LSDP)	Brazauskas II; LSDP–DP–LVNDS	9 (2004)
11		Gediminas Kirkilas (1951–2024)	18 July 2006	9 December 2008	2 years, 144 days	Social Democrats (LSDP)	Kirkilas; LSDP–LVNDS–PDP–LiCS (2006–2008); LSDP–LVNDS–LiCS–PDP–NS (2008)	9 (2004)
(9)		Andrius Kubilius (born 1956)	9 December 2008	13 December 2012	4 years, 4 days	Homeland Union (TS-LKD)	Kubilius II; TS-LKD–TPP–LRLS–LiCS (2008–2009, 2010–2011); TS-LKD–TPP–LRLS–LiCS–VL (2009–2010); TS-LKD–LRLS–LiCS (2011–2012)	10 (2008)
12		Algirdas Butkevičius (born 1958)	13 December 2012	13 December 2016	4 years, 0 days	Social Democrats (LSDP)	Butkevičius; LSDP–DP–TT–LLRA (2012–2014); LSDP–DP–TT (2014–2016)	11 (2012)
13		Saulius Skvernelis (born 1970)	13 December 2016	11 December 2020	3 years, 364 days	Independent (endorsed by LVŽS)	Skvernelis; LVŽS–LSDP (2016–2017); LVŽS–SDD (2017–2018); LVŽS–LSDDP (2018–2019); LVŽS–LSDDP–LLRA-KŠS–TT (2019); LVŽS–LSDDP–LLRA-KŠS (2019–2020)	12 (2016)
14		Ingrida Šimonytė (born 1974)	11 December 2020	12 December 2024	4 years, 1 day	Homeland Union (TS-LKD)	Šimonytė; TS-LKD–LS–LP	13 (2020)
15		Gintautas Paluckas (born 1979)	12 December 2024	4 August 2025	235 days	Social Democrats (LSDP)	Paluckas; LSDP–NA–DSVL	14 (2024)
–		Rimantas Šadžius (born 1960) acting	4 August 2025	25 September 2025	52 days	Social Democrats (LSDP)	Paluckas; LSDP–NA–DSVL	14 (2024)
16		Inga Ruginienė (born 1981)	25 September 2025	23 June 2026	271 days	Social Democrats (LSDP)	Ruginienė; LSDP–NA–LVŽS–LLRA-KŠS (2025–2026); LSDP–LVŽS–LLRA-KŠS (2026)	14 (2024)
16		Inga Ruginienė (born 1981)	23 June 2026 caretaker	14 July 2026	21 days	Social Democrats (LSDP)	Ruginienė; LSDP–NA–LVŽS–LLRA-KŠS (2025–2026); LSDP–LVŽS–LLRA-KŠS (2026)	14 (2024)
17		Mindaugas Sinkevičius (born 1984)	14 July 2026	Incumbent	116 days	Social Democrats (LSDP)	Sinkevičius; LSDP–DSVL–LVŽS–LLRA-KŠS	14 (2024)

== See also ==
- Lists of office-holders
- Grand Chancellor of Lithuania
