= Leonas Bistras =

Lithuanian politician (1890–1971)

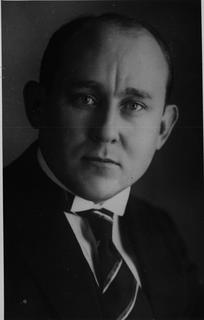

10th Prime Minister of Lithuania
- In office 25 September 1925 – 31 May 1926
- President: Aleksandras Stulginskis
- Preceded by: Vytautas Petrulis
- Succeeded by: Mykolas Sleževičius

Minister of Education
- In office 18 June 1923 – 4 February 1924
- Prime Minister: Antanas Tumėnas
- Preceded by: Petras Juodakis
- Succeeded by: Kazys Jokantas
- In office 17 December 1926 – 3 May 1927
- Prime Minister: Augustinas Voldemaras
- Preceded by: Vincas Čepinskis
- Succeeded by: Konstantinas Šakenis
- In office 28 March 1939 – 21 November 1939
- Prime Minister: Jonas Černius
- Preceded by: Juozas Tonkūnas
- Succeeded by: Kazimieras Jokantas

Minister of Defence
- In office 25 September 1925 – 31 May 1926
- Prime Minister: Himself
- Preceded by: Teodoras Daukantas
- Succeeded by: Juozas Papečkis

Minister of Foreign Affairs
- In office 21 April 1925 – 31 May 1926
- Prime Minister: Himself
- Preceded by: Mečislovas Reinys
- Succeeded by: Mykolas Sleževičius

Personal details
- Born: 20 October 1890 Liepāja, Courland Governorate, Russian Empire (now Latvia)
- Died: 17 October 1971 (aged 80) Kaunas, Lithuanian SSR, Soviet Union
- Resting place: Petrašiūnai Cemetery
- Party: Lithuanian Christian Democratic Party
- Education: University of Freiburg

Leonas Bistras (20 October 1890 in Liepāja – 17 October 1971 in Kaunas) was one of the most prominent Lithuanian politicians of the interwar period. A Christian Democrat, he was appointed as Prime Minister of Lithuania in 1925. Bistras also headed the ministries of education, defense, and foreign affairs in several different governments throughout the 1920s and 1930s, and twice served as the speaker of the Lithuanian parliament, the Seimas. After the 1926 Lithuanian coup d'état and the subsequent fall of parliamentary democracy, Bistras led the Christian Democrats and, despite persecution, acted as an outspoken leader of the opposition to the authoritarian President Antanas Smetona.

After the Soviet occupation and annexation of Lithuania, Bistras was arrested, sentenced without a trial and deported from Lithuania. He only permanently returned after the death of Josef Stalin. Bistras lived the remaining years of his life in obscurity and poverty, supported only by the local people of Kaunas.

== Early life and education ==
Bistras was born in 1890 to a working-class family in Liepāja, Courland Governorate of the Russian Empire (now in Latvia), where his father had emigrated. He graduated from the Liepāja Gymnasium in 1911.

Bistras attempted to study medicine at the University of Geneva, switching to philosophy at the University of Freiburg a year later. He then returned to studying medicine in Dorpat (now Tartu), but was unable to finish due to the complex international environment leading up to World War I. When the war started, Bistras was conscripted into the Imperial Russian Army and served in Russia until the Bolshevik Revolution, initially as a private and later as a medic. After the war, Bistras returned to Lithuania and helped to establish the Kaunas municipality, and worked for the press office in Lithuania and Switzerland.

Bistras graduated from the University of Freiburg in 1921 with a PhD in philosophy. Between 1922 and 1940, he taught at the Faculty of Theology and Philosophy at Kaunas University. Throughout his life, Bistras did not publish a single article (other than his doctoral thesis), but was proud of his doctoral degree, signing his name "Dr. Leonas Bistras" throughout his political career.

== Political career ==
=== Entry into politics ===
Bistras first ventured into politics during World War I. The February Revolution liberalized the political environment and allowed for discussions on the status of Lithuania. In Voronezh, Bistras met other active Lithuanian Catholics and edited the newspaper Voice of the Lithuanians (Lietuvių balsas), giving him his first experience in journalism, which would take much of his interest in the coming decades. In 1917, Bistras joined the emerging Lithuanian Christian Democratic movement.

The political situation during the war led to the formation of two parties styling themselves as the Lithuanian Christian Democratic Party. One was originally established by Lithuanian refugees in Russia, led by the priest Mykolas Krupavičius, and was radicalized by the ongoing revolution there. The other, established in Lithuania, was led by Aleksandras Stulginskis and was more moderate in its goals. In November 1918, a conference was called to unite the two parties. During the conference, Bistras emerged as one of the leaders of the movement and proposed a solution once an impasse was reached – both radical and moderate Christian Democrats would be represented in the joint leadership of the party and both programs would remain in place until they could be aligned. This goal was eventually achieved and the party remained united. Bistras officially joined the party as a member in 1921 and from 1922 onward was regularly elected to its central committee.

=== Member of the Seimas ===
Bistras' growing prominence in Lithuanian politics was evident when, in 1922, he was elected to the First Seimas from the constituency of Raseiniai and became its speaker. He played a role in the election of Stulginskis as President of Lithuania, dismissing complaints from the opposition politicians that the Seimas did not have the necessary quorum when it voted on his candidacy. The first Seimas, however, had a short and troubled life – no clear majority emerged in the elections (Christian Democrats and their allies won 38 of the 78 seats allocated), making it difficult to govern. In fact, Prime Minister Ernestas Galvanauskas failed twice to get his cabinet approved by the Seimas and Stulginskis dissolved the First Seimas on 12 March 1923. However, the Seimas did play a role in the history of interwar Lithuania, authorizing the Klaipėda Revolt that saw the Klaipėda Region become an autonomous part of Lithuania between 1923 and 1939.

Bistras was reelected to the Second Seimas in 1923. Between June 1923 and January 1925, he served as minister of education in successive cabinets headed by Galvanauskas and Antanas Tumėnas. As a minister, he took a hard line insisting on religious instruction in public schools, drawing criticism from political opponents. Between January and September 1925, Bistras again served as speaker of the Seimas.

=== Prime minister ===
In September 1925, the government of Vytautas Petrulis opened negotiations with Poland over navigation on the Neman as required by the Klaipėda Convention. Successive Lithuanian governments bitterly contested Polish possession of the Vilnius region and refused to open diplomatic relations. Although Petrulis' government saw negotiations as technical and not constituting diplomatic recognition, public and military discontent was widespread. An ultimatum from military offices forced Petrulis to resign and Bistras was appointed as prime minister of the 12th cabinet on 25 September 1925. He also served as minister of defense and, after Mečislovas Reinys resigned, as the minister of foreign affairs. His government was in power for less than a year, until the Seimas elections.

Bistras' cabinet withdrew from the negotiations with Poland. Feeling isolated in the international arena, Bistras started negotiations with the Soviet Union on the Soviet–Lithuanian Non-Aggression Pact that the government of Mykolas Sleževičius eventually signed in 1926. Bistras later regretted this shift in political direction. Seeing the growing power of the Soviet Union and Germany in the mid-1930s, he advocated for stronger ties with Latvia, Estonia and, above else, Poland, even if it meant accepting Polish possession of Vilnius.

A major challenge for the Bistras' government was managing relations with the Holy See in the Vatican. While Christian Democrats were naturally aligned with the Church in their views on a number of matters, organization of the Catholic Church presented the Lithuanian government with a headache. Even after the declaration of independence in 1918, Catholic churches in Lithuania continued to be organized under ecclesiastical provinces based in foreign countries. The issue escalated in 1925 when the Holy See signed the Concordat of 1925 with Poland and assigned the contested Archdiocese of Vilnius to the Polish ecclesiastical province. While this did not confer diplomatic recognition of the Polish possession of Vilnius, public opinion in Lithuania turned against the Vatican and the Christian Democrats, who were perceived as their allies. Despite protests, Bistras accepted the establishment of a Lithuanian ecclesiastical province without Vilnius in 1926.

Bistras was elected to the Third Seimas in 1926, this time from Marijampolė, but Christian Democrats and their allies did not fare well in the elections. For the first time in six years, the party was in the opposition to a left-leaning coalition that attempted to normalize life in Lithuania by lifting martial law and introducing far-reaching reforms. Christian Democrats proved to be an active opposition in the parliament, with multiple interpellations of the government, many of them co-authored or signed by Bistras. Christian Democrats voted against the treaty with the Soviet Union originally conceived under Bistras' government and criticized other government decisions as support for the government waned, especially among military officers and clergy.

=== Coup d'état and Smetona's rule ===
In December 1926, military officers executed a coup d'état, that removed Mykolas Sleževičius as prime minister and Kazys Grinius as president. Although Bistras and the Christian Democrats were not directly involved in the coup, they participated in implementing its outcome. Christian Democrats voted to elect Antanas Smetona president, thus giving him constitutional legitimacy, and initially joined the government, with Bistras appointed minister of education. Bistras, ever trying to reach a compromise, initially hoped that a new election would be called, allowing the Christian Democrats to return to power. As the prospect of new elections waned and the Third Seimas was dissolved, Bistras and other Christian Democrats resigned from the government, leaving Smetona's Nationalists Union of Lithuania as the sole governing party.

Bistras assumed leadership of the Christian Democrats in 1927 in a difficult period. Smetona did not call for new parliamentary elections until 1936, severely limiting the activities and influence of the party. Party leadership was constantly persecuted and surveilled, and party congresses were banned in 1929. Christian Democrats also struggled to maintain unity with their traditional allies, the Farmers' Association and the Labour Federation, as well as within their own ranks. The party, along with other opposition political parties, was finally banned in 1936. is Bistras was openly critical of the government in this period. In 1927, he was alleged to have influenced several military officers who attempted to force Smetona to form a coalition government. The intervention failed and Brisas fled Lithuania for Germany, returning only the following year. Starting in 1930, he and other Catholic leaders criticized the government for attempting to curtail the activities of religious organizations and, in 1935, openly criticized the government in a speech at the Global Lithuanian Congress.

Until 1936, Bistras also edited newspaper Rytas (The Morning), giving a voice to Christian Democrats in Lithuania. The newspaper was often critical of Smetona and the ruling Nationalists, and was often a target of censorship and fines. In 1928, publication of the newspaper was suspended as a result of "infractions" and Bistras began publishing Sutemos' (The Dusk) instead, expressing the editor's view of the situation in the country. Bistras had many political articles published in the minority, and especially Jewish, press, which was less subject to censor.

For inciting protests against the government, Bistras was sentenced in 1938 to a three-month exile to Alytus, isolating him from the political elite in Kaunas. His sentence was cut short and Bistras even returned to the government after Lithuania lost the Klaipėda Region to the German ultimatum of March 1939. He served in the 20th cabinet as minister of education. Even as a member of the government, Bistras maintained an explicitly cold relationship with Smetona, refusing to present the president with the work plan for his ministry.

== Later life and death ==
In July 1940, Bistras was arrested, imprisoned in Kaunas Prison, and deported without a trial to Arkhangelsk in 1941. Charges laid against him were related to the suppression of the Lithuanian Communist Party in interwar Lithuania. Proving Bistras' involvement in the suppression was not seen as necessary; his mere participation in the government and the Christian Democratic Party was enough. For health reasons, he was transferred to Atbasar in Kazakhstan, where he worked as a medic. In January 1945, he was sentenced again, for allegedly providing a fake certificate of absence, but was released seven months later and allowed to return to Lithuania. In Lithuania, he worked at the library of the Archdiocese of Vilnius. In 1950, he was again arrested, sentenced, and sent to Siberia, only returning in 1954 or 1956. As he was not granted a pension or given work by the Soviet government, Bistras lived on donations from the people of Kaunas, where he died in 1971, three days before his 81st birthday. He was buried in Petrašiūnai Cemetery in Kaunas.

Preceded by Vytautas Petrulis	Prime Minister of Lithuania; 25 September 1925 – 15 June 1926	Succeeded by Mykolas Sleževičius
