= Antanas Tumėnas =

Lithuanian politician

8th Prime Minister of Lithuania
- In office 18 June 1924 – 27 January 1925
- President: Aleksandras Stulginskis
- Preceded by: Ernestas Galvanauskas
- Succeeded by: Vytautas Petrulis

Personal details
- Born: 13 May 1880 Kurkliečiai, Kovno Governorate, Russian Empire
- Died: 8 February 1946 (aged 65) Bachmanning, Austria
- Party: Lithuanian Christian Democratic Party
- Education: Saint Petersburg State University

Antanas Tumėnas (13 May 1880 in Kurkliečiai, near Rokiškis – 8 February 1946 in Bachmanning, Austria) was a Lithuanian politician, teacher, professor of law, judge, 8th Prime Minister of Lithuania, and Chairman of the Supreme Committee for the Liberation of Lithuania. He was a member of the Lithuanian Christian Democratic Party.

Tumėnas was elected to the Constituent Assembly of Lithuania and was appointed as chairman of the Constitutional Commission of Lithuania (1922).

Later, he was a member of the 1st Seimas. He was the speaker of Seimas in 1923. He participated in creating the law system of the new republic. He was Minister of Justice in the 9th, 10th, and 11th Cabinets of Lithuania.

Preceded by Ernestas Galvanauskas	Prime Minister of Lithuania; 18 June 1924 – 4 February 1925	Succeeded by Vytautas Petrulis
