= Mykolas Sleževičius =

Lithuanian lawyer, political figure (1882–1939)

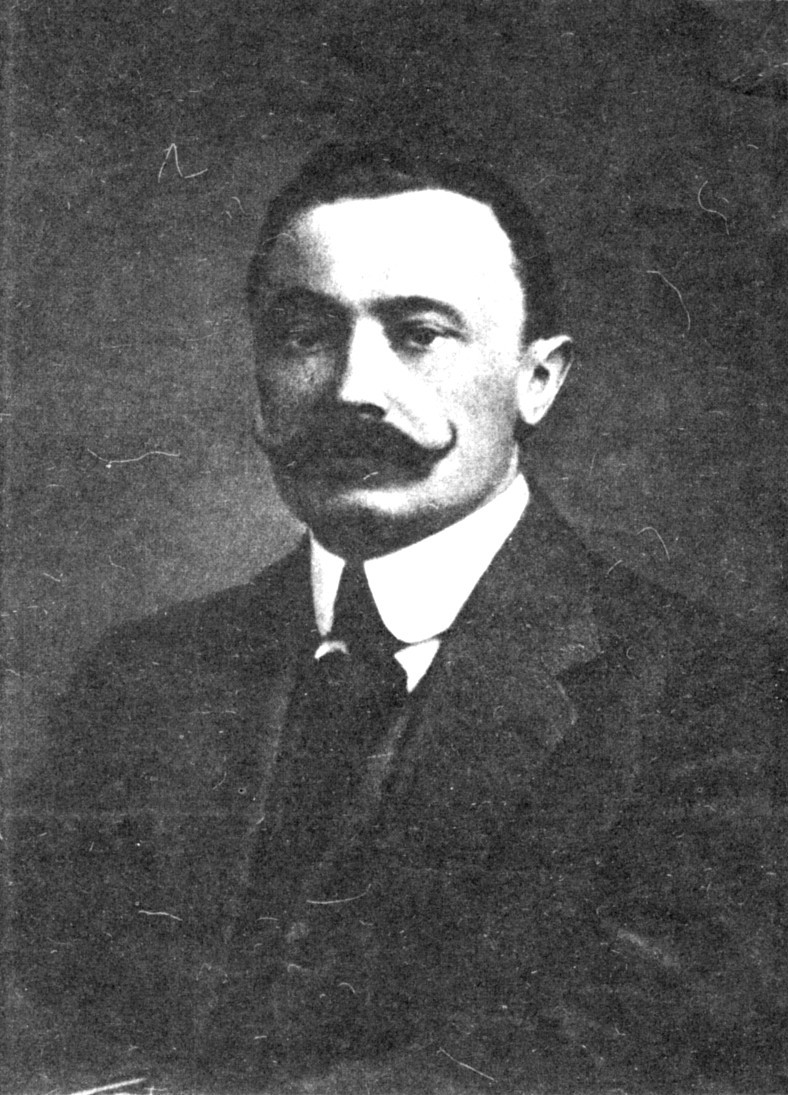

2nd, 4th and 11th Prime Minister of Lithuania
- In office 26 December 1918 – 12 March 1919
- Preceded by: Augustinas Voldemaras
- Succeeded by: Pranas Dovydaitis
- In office 12 April 1919 – 7 October 1919
- President: Antanas Smetona
- Preceded by: Pranas Dovydaitis
- Succeeded by: Ernestas Galvanauskas
- In office 15 June 1926 – 17 December 1926
- President: Kazys Grinius
- Preceded by: Leonas Bistras
- Succeeded by: Augustinas Voldemaras

Minister of Justice
- In office 15 June 1926 – 17 December 1926
- Prime Minister: Himself
- Preceded by: Vincas Karoblis
- Succeeded by: Petras Karvelis

Personal details
- Born: 21 February 1882 Drembliai village, Kovno Governorate, Russian Empire (now Lithuania)
- Died: 11 November 1939 (aged 57) Kaunas, Lithuania
- Resting place: Petrašiūnai Cemetery
- Party: Lithuanian Democratic Party
- Other political affiliations: Lithuanian Popular Socialist Democratic Party; Lithuanian Popular Peasants' Union
- Spouse: Domicėlė Sleževičienė
- Children: Marytė Sleževičiūtė
- Education: Odessa University

Mykolas Sleževičius (21 February 1882 – 11 November 1939) was a Lithuanian lawyer, political and cultural figure, and journalist. One of the most influential figures in inter-war Lithuania, he served as the prime minister of Lithuania on three occasions. Taking the helm of the government at a difficult time in 1918 and again in 1919, Sleževičius has been credited with preparing Lithuania for the fights to come and for laying the foundations of the fledgling state.

Sleževičius was elected to the Lithuanian parliament, initially the Constituent Assembly, later the Seimas, on four occasions. In 1926, as a representative of the Lithuanian Popular Peasants' Union, Sleževičius became the prime minister for a third time. His government introduced important changes aimed at normalizing the situation in Lithuania, but the reforms faced resistance from the Catholic clergy, military officers, and the parliamentary opposition. The resistance culminated in a military coup d'état in December 1926, which brought to power the authoritarian rule of Antanas Smetona. Sleževičius continued participating in the activities of his party but never again regained his previous influence.

== Early life ==
Mykolas Sleževičius was born on 21 February 1882 in Drembliai village in Kovno Governorate of the Russian Empire (now part of Raseiniai district municipality, Lithuania). He was the oldest of two brothers, with Kazimieras Sleževičius, who would grow up to become a geophysicist, born in 1890. That same year, their father, Feliksas Sleževičius died.

Despite the early death of his father, and with the support from his aunt and uncle, Mykolas Sleževičius left for studies in Jelgava (then known as Mitau), graduating from the Jelgava Gymnasium in 1901. After failing to get accepted to the Riga Polytechnicum (now Riga Technical University), he started studying law at the Odessa University in 1902.

== Early political activities ==
While in Odessa, Sleževičius became politically involved, with Juozas Gabrys taking credit for converting him to the Lithuanian nationalist cause. He was also involved in a number of cultural and religious activities, organizing courses, concerts, and plays, and arranging for religious mass in the Lithuanian language. Sleževičius took part in the Russian Revolution of 1905, maintaining public order together with other volunteers. That same year, he represented Odessa Lithuanians in the Great Seimas of Vilnius and started contributing to the newspaper Lietuvos ūkininkas.

After receiving a law degree in 1907, Sleževičius returned to Lithuania and joined the Lithuanian Democratic Party (LDP). For the following five years, he practiced the legal profession, participated in cultural activities (particularly in theater performances of the Rūta Society), and served as the chief editor of Lietuvos ūkininkas (1907–12), and another newspaper Lietuvos žinios (1910–12). When the German army occupied Lithuania in 1915, Sleževičius left for Russia.

Sleževičius remained active with the Lithuanian community, participating in the activities of the Lithuanian Society to Help Those Suffering from War, touring Russia as its representative. In 1917, Sleževičius, together with Felicija Bortkevičienė and other allies, broke away from the LDP to form the Lithuanian Popular Socialist Democratic Party.

In 1917, Sleževičius, together with Kazys Grinius, joined the presidium of the newly established Supreme Council of Lithuania in Russia, based in Voronezh. Buoyed by the Act of Independence of Lithuania, the Council encouraged ideas of Lithuanian sovereignty, issued passports, and assisted Lithuanians in returning to their homeland. For his activities, Sleževičius was briefly imprisoned by the Bolsheviks in 1918. He was released after a month in prison and fled to Moscow, eventually returning to Lithuania on 19 December 1918.

== Head of the cabinet ==
Sleževičius returned to Lithuania at a difficult time; the fledgling Lithuanian state with no significant armed forces was threatened by the approaching Bolshevik army and General Kyprian Kandratovich, who was the Deputy Minister of Defense, failed to take measures to organize the defense of the country and proposed to move the government to Grodno. Prime Minister Augustinas Voldemaras, who had been appointed just a month before, and the Chairman of the Council of Lithuania Antanas Smetona left Lithuania for Germany on 20 and 21 December 1918, respectively, in an action that many within the country perceived as fleeing. Stasys Šilingas, who was one of only two remaining members of the Council of Lithuania, declared his assumption of dictatorial powers on 22 December 1918, but failed to win support of the military officers, who demanded his resignation just a day later and offered the dictatorial powers to Sleževičius. While refusing to assume dictatorship, Sleževičius agreed to take over as the prime minister, on the condition that his government be granted full legislative powers. The council agreed and officially dissolved the cabinet of Voldemeras on 26 December 1918, after the resignation of its ministers, appointing Sleževičius in his stead.

His first term was a difficult one; the Polish army took Vilnius in January 1919, forcing the government to flee to Kaunas, while the Bolshevik forces were also advancing. Sleževičius worked to secure assistance from Germany, which still had forces left in Lithuania, while at the same time mobilizing the Lithuanian forces. On 8 January 1919, the German government communicated that its forces would cooperate with the Lithuanians in the fight against Bolsheviks, eventually pushing them back. The government had wide-ranging powers, proclaiming laws when the Council of Lithuania was not in session. However, these powers brought the government into conflict with the Council. After disagreements, particularly with Šilingas, Sleževičius resigned from his post on 12 March 1919.

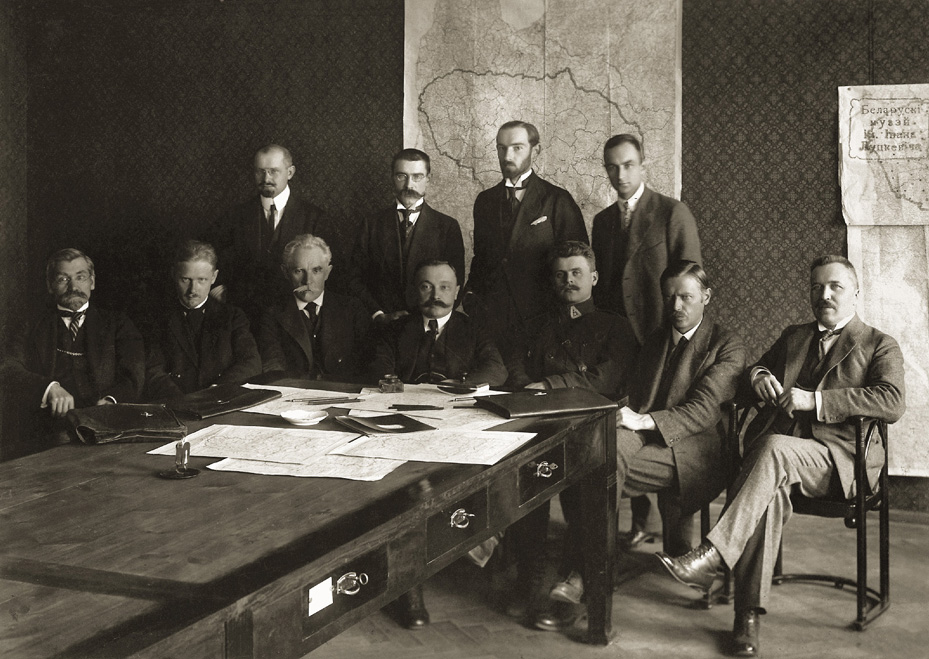
Mykolas Sleževičius (seated, in the middle), the head of the Fourth Cabinet.

Just two weeks later, Sleževičius was asked to lead the government again, which he accepted only on the condition that the Council of Lithuania elected a president to replace it as the collegial head of state. The Council agreed, electing Smetona as the first President of Lithuania, prompting Prime Minister Pranas Dovydaitis to resign. Sleževičius was appointed as the prime minister on 12 April 1919 and also served as the acting minister of foreign affairs for the entire term. His coalition cabinet, the fourth in Lithuania, established a volunteer army, which became the Lithuanian Armed Forces, and took actions to thwart the aims of the Polish nationalist organization, the Polska Organizacja Wojskowa (POW). The cabinet also laid the foundations for the Lithuanian state institutions, in the areas of government, finance, law, and municipalities. Sleževičius' government also prepared the first draft of the land reform, which acted as a key instrument of national defense by promising land in return for military service, aiding the recruitment of personnel to the armed forces.

After the resignation of right-wing members of the government and political maneuvering from Voldemaras and Martynas Yčas, the government collapsed and Sleževičius resigned on 7 October 1919. Sleževičius declined to take part in the subsequent government headed by Ernestas Galvanauskas.

== Member of the Seimas ==
Already, in 1919, Sleževičius had prepared the groundwork for the parliamentary elections. In April 1920, he was elected as the representative of II (Kaunas) constituency to the Constituent Assembly of Lithuania, tasked with drafting the Constitution of Lithuania. His Lithuanian Popular Socialist Democratic Party (LSLDP) formed a block with the Peasant Union, another breakaway from LDP. Later in 1920, after an armed conflict between Poland and Lithuania erupted, Sleževičius was elected the chairman of the Lithuanian Defense Committee (Vyriausias Lietuvos gynimo komitetas), tasked with organizing and supporting the armed forces. Even without a position on the government, Sleževičius remained an influential politician. According to prominent inter-war lawyer Michał Pius Römer, in 1921, Sleževičius was "one of the most powerful men in the country".

In the elections of 1922, Sleževičius was elected to the First Seimas, but LSLDP ended up with only 1% of the vote and 5 seats. On 24 November 1922, the party merged with the Peasant Union to form the Lithuanian Popular Peasants' Union (LVLS), with Sleževičius presiding over the political group in the Seimas. The First Seimas was short-lived and LVLS was successful in the elections of 1923, winning 17.9% of the vote and 16 seats, the largest single party in the Second Seimas.

The elections of 1926 proved to be even more successful for LVLS, with the party winning 22.2% of the vote and 22 seats in the Third Seimas. Sleževičius was once again reelected to the parliament and was invited by the newly elected President Kazys Grinius to form the 13th cabinet.

== 13th cabinet and the coup d'état ==
The government started work on 15 June 1926. Sleževičius was also the minister of justice and the acting minister of foreign affairs on the coalition cabinet with the Social Democratic Party of Lithuania.

The coalition cabinet took important steps in normalizing the situation in Lithuania. The martial law, still in effect in Kaunas and some other locations since the independence, was lifted, political freedoms restored and a broad amnesty for political prisoners was declared. The decisions were heavily criticized by the opposition which alleged that the government was playing into the hands of communists and other enemies of the state. On November 21, a student demonstration against the perceived "Bolshevization" was forcibly dispersed by the police.

Allegations of pro-communist stances continued with the signing of the Soviet–Lithuanian Non-Aggression Pact. The treaty had been conceived and negotiated by the previous Christian Democratic government of Leonas Bistras, but was signed by Sleževičius, with Christian Democrats voting against it. The Christian Democrats and the Catholic Church was further alienated when the government proposed to cut the salaries for the clergy and the subsidies for Catholic schools as part of the budget for 1927.

Cuts to the military were also part of the proposed budget. This, together with the alleged inability of the government to tackle the perceived communist threat and the dismissal of many conservative military officers, alienated the military establishment. Preparations for the coup began in November 1926.

In the evening of 16 December, a Soviet diplomat informed Sleževičius about a possible coup the following night, but Sleževičius did not take any actions. On the evening of 17 December 1926, during the 60th birthday celebrations for President Grinius, the military executed a coup d'état, taking over central military and government offices and arresting officials. Colonel Povilas Plechavičius invited Smetona, a Nationalist who had been aware of the coup beforehand, to take over as the president. Sleževičius resigned as the prime minister and Grinius was forced to appoint Voldemaras, another Nationalist figure, as his replacement. Grinius soon resigned and the Seimas, based on the votes of the Christian Democrats, elected Smetona as the new president. While initially maintaining the façade of constitutionality, Smetona dismissed the Third Seimas in April 1927, not calling for fresh elections for more than 9 years.

== Under Smetona's rule ==
The coup effectively ended Sleževičius' political career. Already ill during the events, Sleževičius left to seek treatment abroad and did not return to work in the Seimas before its dissolution. On 3 January 1927, his resignation from the Central Committee of LVLS was accepted. Kazys Škirpa (LVLS) commented that the "violence of 17 December suddenly parted M. Sleževičius from any kind of political activity, as if he had been euthanized as a political persona".

The activities, or the lack of activities, of Sleževičius and Grinius during the coup would come under intense criticism during the following years of authoritarian rule. Only in January 1929 did Sleževičius return to the activities of LVLS, making a speech in front of the party assembly defending his actions during the coup and placing the blame for the coup on the Christian Democrats. Sleževičius argued that resigning was the only way to avoid significant bloodshed and that he had not believed that the Christian Democrats would open the doors for authoritarian rule. In 1931, he was again elected to the Central Committee of the party. Throughout the authoritarian rule, Sleževičius and his party maintained commitment to parliamentary democracy and called for new elections to the Seimas. Sleževičius participated in events and political groups with like minded individuals, but did not manage to affect the political system. The elections to the Seimas that finally took place in 1936 did not live up to democratic standards, with opposition parties outlawed in 1935 and opposition candidates, including Sleževičius, prevented from standing.

== Other activities and personal life ==
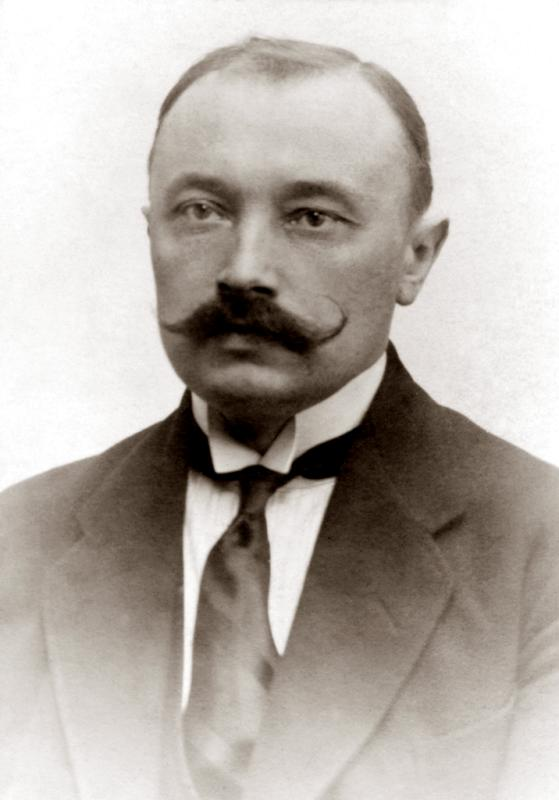
Mykolas Sleževičius

Sleževičius was a prominent lawyer in inter-war Lithuania. After the coup, he worked as a lawyer for various organizations, and was a member (from 1925) and the Chairman (from 1938) of the Lithuanian Council of Lawyers.

Sleževičius was an avid theater lover. Already, in Odessa, he had established a cultural society Rūta, which was one of the centers of Lithuanian cultural life in the city. After returning to Lithuania, Sleževičius took part in establishing a cultural society of the same name in Vilnius, acting as its secretary. The society was active between 1908 and 1918 and operated a library, organized lectures and concerts, and staged over 50 plays. Sleževičius directed several of them, with his staging of Juliusz Słowacki's "Mindaugas" (1908) and Vincas Nagornockis' "Živilė" (1909) particularly well received.

Sleževičius edited several newspapers (Bendrija, Lietuvos ūkininkas, and Lietuvos žinios) and contributed to others (Varpas). He also translated a number of dramas into the Lithuanian language and initiated the publishing of the Lithuanian Encyclopedia.

Sleževičius was married to Domicėlė Sleževičienė, who worked as a dentist. The pair had no children of their own, but had an adopted daughter Marytė Sleževičiūtė-Mackevičienė. Marytė married Mečislovas Mackevičius, who would later serve as the minister of justice on the Provisional Government of Lithuania in 1941. Mykolas Sleževičius' brother Kazys Sleževičius was a prominent geophysicist in Lithuania, Head of the Department of Geophysics and Meteorology at the Lithuanian University (now Vytautas Magnus University), later at the Vilnius University.

Sleževičius died on 11 November 1939 in Kaunas. He was buried in the Petrašiūnai Cemetery.

Preceded by Augustinas Voldemaras	Prime Minister of Lithuania; 26 December 1918 – 12 March 1919	Succeeded by Pranas Dovydaitis
Preceded by Pranas Dovydaitis	Prime Minister of Lithuania; 12 April 1919 – 7 October 1919	Succeeded by Ernestas Galvanauskas
Preceded by Leonas Bistras	Prime Minister of Lithuania; 15 June 1926 – 17 December 1926	Succeeded by Augustinas Voldemaras
