= Ernestas Galvanauskas =

Lithuanian politician (1882–1967)

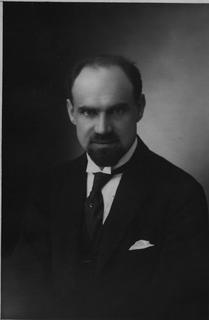

5th and 7th Prime Minister of Lithuania
- In office 2 February 1922 – 17 June 1924
- President: Aleksandras Stulginskis
- Preceded by: Kazys Grinius
- Succeeded by: Antanas Tumėnas
- In office 7 October 1919 – 15 June 1920
- President: Antanas Smetona
- Preceded by: Mykolas Sleževičius
- Succeeded by: Kazys Grinius

Personal details
- Born: 20 November 1882 Zizonys, Kovno Governorate, Russian Empire (now Zizonys, Lithuania)
- Died: 24 July 1967 (aged 84) Aix-les-Bains, France
- Party: Lithuanian Peasant Union
- Education: Saint Petersburg Mining Institute

Ernestas Galvanauskas (20 November 1882 – 24 July 1967) was a Lithuanian engineer, politician, and one of the founders of the Peasant Union (which later merged with the Lithuanian Popular Peasants' Union). He also served twice as Prime Minister of Lithuania.

== Biography ==
Born in Zizonys, Biržai district municipality, in 1882, Galvanauskas completed his secondary education at the Gymnasium of Jelgava, Latvia in 1902. He then took up studies in engineering in St. Petersburg, Russia. He was active in the Russian Revolution of 1905 in Lithuania, and founded the Lithuanian Peasants' Union. Later, he was elected as a delegate to the Great Seimas of Vilnius. He was arrested and imprisoned in the Panevėžys Prison, but escaped and, with the help of Felicija Bortkevičienė, fled abroad.

Between 1906 and 1919, he lived first in Finland, then in Liège (Belgium) from 1908, where he completed his studies and received a diploma in mining engineering from the Technical University and another one from the Electrotechnical Institute. He then worked on the railroad in Serbia. In 1919, he was a member of the Lithuanian delegation at the Versailles Conference being held in Paris. In October 1919, Galvanauskas became Prime Minister of Lithuania, serving until April 1920. During that time, he also served as Minister of Finance, Trade, and Industry. In 1921, Galvanauskas was also a delegate to the League of Nations, where he worked to obtain international recognition of Lithuania.

Between February 1922 and June 1924, Galvanauskas was Lithuania's Minister of Foreign Affairs. During this period, Galvanauskas' efforts also helped to establish the University of Lithuania in 1923. His home was the target of a bomb attack by extreme nationalists (Committee for the Salvation of Lithuania) who suspected him and his French wife to be pro-Polish, which resulted in him becoming injured.

== Klaipėda years ==
Galvanauskas was a major force behind the Klaipėda Revolt. Afterwards, Galvanauskas led the Lithuanian delegation in Paris that negotiated the Klaipėda Convention to determine the future of the Klaipėda Region.

Between 1924 and 1927, Galvanauskas was accredited to the Court of St. James's in London and became Lithuania's ambassador to Great Britain. After the 1926 Lithuanian coup d'état, he resigned from that post and returned to Klaipėda, where he devoted himself mostly to teaching. In 1927-1928, he was chairman of Klaipėda's port board, chairman of Klaipėda's Teachers Society, and between 1934 and 1939, he established the Klaipėda Commerce Institute, and was its director. He was involved in re-organizing Klaipėda's woodworking industry, and founded a building company that constructed apartments for workers. He also founded Klaipėda's Trade School. He was a member of the board of directors for the Rytas publishing house, and chief editor of the newspaper Vakarai.

In 1939–1940, he became Lithuanian Minister of Finance, but after the first Soviet occupation, he fled to Klaipėda, which had been reoccupied by Germany in 1939. In 1941, the Nazis arrested him and he was sent into exile.

== Exile ==
At the end of 1946, Galvanauskas became head of the Supreme Committee for the Liberation of Lithuania. In 1947, he emigrated to Madagascar, where he taught courses on commerce and industry. In 1963, Galvanauskas moved to France and lived there until he died in 1967 in Aix-les-Bains.

== Publications ==
- Valstija ir mokesčiai, 1909
- Pologne et Lithuanie, 1923
- Atsiminimai, 1925

Political offices
Preceded by Mykolas Sleževičius	Prime Minister of Lithuania; 7 October 1919 – 19 June 1920	Succeeded by Kazys Grinius
Preceded by Kazys Grinius	Prime Minister of Lithuania; 2 February 1922 – 18 June 1924	Succeeded by Antanas Tumėnas
