= Juozas Tumas-Vaižgantas =

Lithuanian Roman Catholic priest and activist

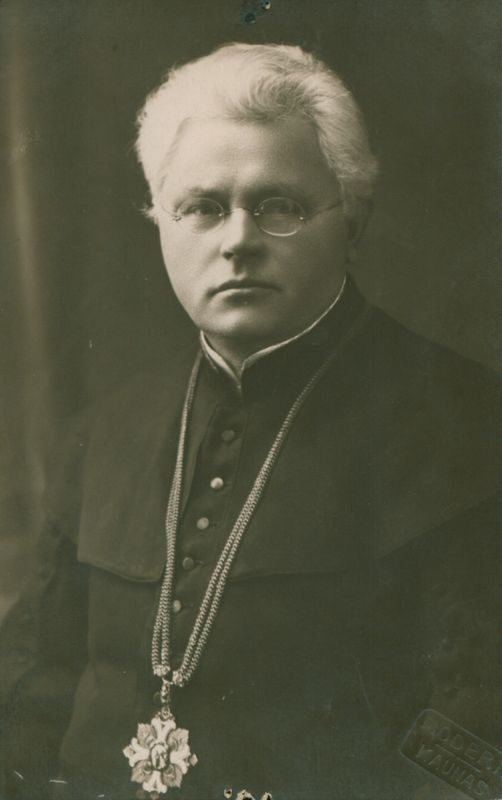
- Tumas in 1923
- Born: Juozas Tumas; 20 September 1869; Maleišiai, Kovno Governorate, Russian Empire
- Died: 29 April 1933 (aged 63); Kaunas, Lithuania
- Resting place: Church of Vytautas the Great
- Other name: Vaižgantas
- Education: Kaunas Priest Seminary
- Occupations: Catholic priest, newspaper editor, writer
- Notable work: Pragiedruliai (Cloud Clearing); Dėdės ir dėdienės (Uncles and Aunts)
- Political party: Party of National Progress
- Movement: Lithuanian National Revival
- Awards: Order of the Lithuanian Grand Duke Gediminas (1928); Order of Vytautas the Great (1932); Order of the Three Stars (1932)

Juozas Tumas also known by the pen name Vaižgantas (20 September 1869 – 29 April 1933) was a Lithuanian Roman Catholic priest and an activist during the Lithuanian National Revival. He was a prolific writer, editor of nine periodicals, university professor, and member of numerous societies and organizations. His most notable works of fiction include the novel Pragiedruliai (Cloud Clearing) and the narrative Dėdės ir dėdienės (Uncles and Aunts) about the ordinary village folk.

Born to a family of Lithuanian peasants, Tumas was educated at a gymnasium in Daugavpils (present-day Latvia) and Kaunas Priest Seminary. He began contributing to the Lithuanian press, then banned by the Tsarist authorities, in 1889 or 1890. He was ordained as a priest in 1893 and posted to Mitau (present-day Jelgava, Latvia). In 1895, he was reassigned to Mosėdis in northwestern Lithuania. There he organized the publication of Tėvynės sargas and the book smuggling into Lithuania. His brother Jonas was caught with the banned publications and was sentenced to three years in prison and two years of exile. Due to his Lithuanian activities and short temper, Tumas quarreled with his superiors and was frequently moved to increasingly more remote parishes. However, in 1906, bishops of Samogitia and Vilnius agreed to allow Tumas to move to Vilnius to work as an editor of the daily Vilniaus žinios published by Petras Vileišis. He edited the newspaper only for a couple of months but remained in Vilnius as editor of Viltis, co-founded with Antanas Smetona. This new cultural newspaper hoped to unite conservative Catholic clergy and more liberal intelligentsia for the common good of the Lithuanian nation. After publishing an article critical of the Diocese of Vilnius for suppressing the Lithuanian language in favor of the Polish language, Tumas was exiled to Laižuva in 1911.

In 1911, together with Konstantinas Olšauskas, he toured Lithuanian American communities collecting donations for the construction of the headquarters of the Saulė Society. During World War I, Tumas moved to Riga and edited Rygos garsas. As a member of the Lithuanian Society for the Relief of War Sufferers, he organized relief for Lithuanian refugees. In 1917, as one of the founders of the Party of National Progress, he attended political conferences in Petrograd, Kiev, and Stockholm advocating for full independence of Lithuania. He returned to Vilnius in 1918, but moved to Kaunas after the former was captured by Poland. He edited Tauta, published by the Party of National Progress, and ran in the elections to the Constituent Assembly of Lithuania, but largely withdrew from politics when he was not elected. He became rector of the Church of Vytautas the Great and organized its reconstruction. From 1922 to 1929, he taught a course on the Lithuanian literature during the era of the Lithuanian press ban (1864–1904) at the University of Lithuania. Tumas published several works on writers' biographies and amassed a large collection of material (manuscripts, correspondence, photos, etc.) about the writers. On the basis of this material, he organized a literary archive at the university.

== Biography ==
=== Early life and education ===
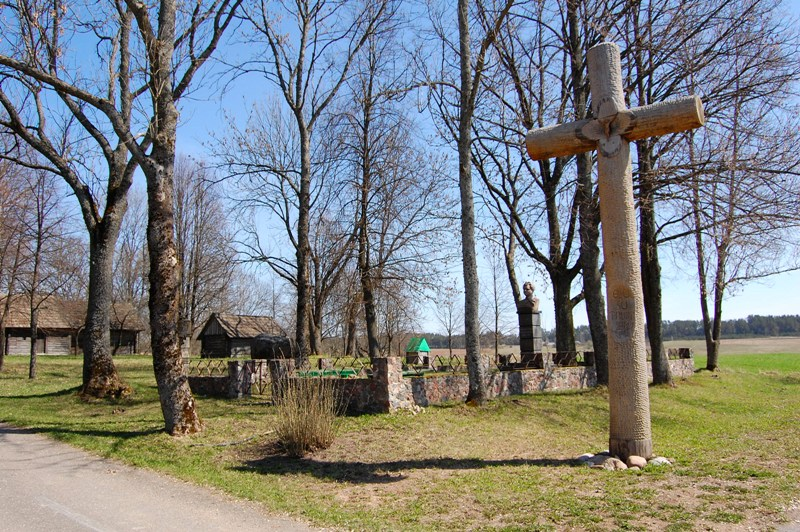
Tumas' memorial in his native Maleišiai

Tumas was born in the village of Maleišiai north of Svėdasai into a peasant family that owned 24 dessiatins of land. He was the youngest of ten children, but only he and four siblings survived to adulthood. Tumas was born at midday of the Nativity of Mary (O.S. 8 September). His mother, aged 45, took all this as a sign that he should become a priest. At age five, Tumas received his Confirmation from bishop Motiejus Valančius in Kaunas. He completed his elementary school studies in Kunigiškiai II within two years, which was faster than any other student. However, his knowledge was poor – he had very good memory and could repeat material without understanding it. Nevertheless, in fall 1881, he managed to pass entrance exams to the gymnasium in Daugavpils which accepted about 50 students out of 150 applicants. After four years of study, his parents urged him to transfer to the Kaunas Priest Seminary, but he decided to finish the studies and started earning a living by giving private lessons. Long studies followed by private lessons to make a living negatively impacted Tumas' health and he frequently contracted respiratory illnesses.

During this time he developed an interest in Russian classic literature, particularly biographies and memoirs. His favorites were autobiographical novels Childhood, Boyhood, and Youth by Leo Tolstoy. He also read Sergey Aksakov, Ivan Turgenev (A Sportsman's Sketches), Gleb Uspensky, Mikhail Zagoskin, Ivan Goncharov, Nikolay Dobrolyubov, Dmitry Pisarev, and other authors. The gymnasium students organized and Tumas participated in illegal groups to read and discuss various banned, mostly socialist, publications. Lithuanian Povilas Matulionis introduced Tumas to Aušra (Dawn), the first Lithuanian-language periodical that was printed in Tilsit, East Prussia, due to the Lithuanian press ban. However, Tumas did not adopt socialist worldview and there were too few Lithuanians to develop any kind of Lithuanian activities. After repeating the final year for the second time, Tumas graduated the gymnasium in 1888.

After graduation, Tumas had to choose university or priest seminary. He doubted his calling for priesthood and considered studying veterinary in Saint Petersburg. His family's wishes and his poor health decided that he applied to the Kaunas Priest Seminary. He had no particular calling for the theology studies and especially struggled with Latin: before entering the seminary, he knew no Latin and there were no Lithuanian or Russian dictionaries, thus he had to use a Polish–Latin dictionary but he did not know Polish either. Lithuanian language was taught by Kazimieras Jaunius who provided little practical knowledge but inspired his students. Lithuanian students, including Tumas, organized a secret society with a goal of translating and publishing various Lithuanian religious texts. It became known as the Society of Saint Casimir when one of its members obtained relics of Saint Casimir, the patron saint of Lithuania. Catholic periodical Žemaičių ir Lietuvos apžvalga (Samogitian and Lithuanian Review) appeared in October 1889 and Tumas contributed articled on Catholic and Lithuanian topics. His first contribution to the Lithuanian press was a correspondence to either Varpas in 1889 or Žemaičių ir Lietuvos apžvalga in 1890.

Due to a bout of tuberculosis, Tumas interrupted his studies in early 1890 and returned to his native Maleišiai for vacation and treatment for a year and a half. During that time, he continued to write for Žemaičių ir Lietuvos apžvalga. He returned to the seminary and concentrated on his studies, graduating in fall 1893. During the summer 1893, Tumas traveled to Mosėdis in an attempt to persuade Kazimieras Pakalniškis, editor of Žemaičių ir Lietuvos apžvalga, to soften his criticism of the secular intelligentsia. He was ordained as a priest on 28 November 1893 in Kaunas Cathedral by bishop Mečislovas Leonardas Paliulionis. At some point, he also joined the Third Order of Saint Francis.

=== Publisher of Tėvynės sargas ===
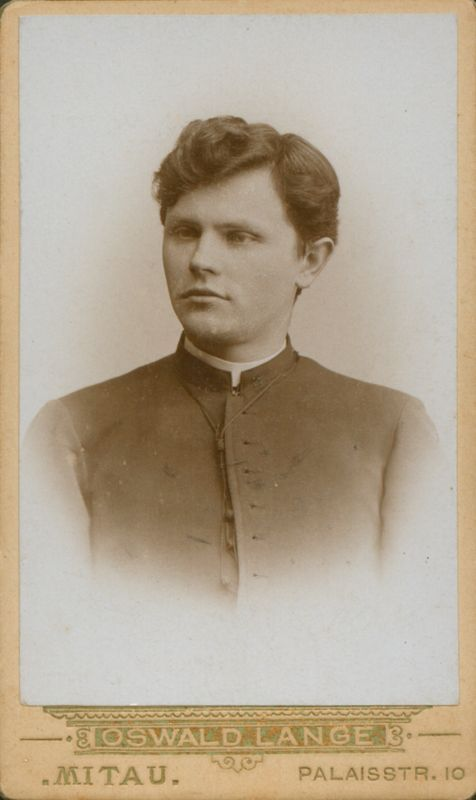
Tumas in 1894

Tumas was first sent by the Diocese of Samogitia as vicar to Mitau (present-day Jelgava, Latvia), away from Lithuanian-speaking areas. However, Mitau already had a vicar, who moved from Ilūkste without diocese's approval. Therefore, Tumas received a very cold welcome from local priests. He worked as a chaplain of a prison and a private gymnasium, and struggled with Polish-language sermons. In Mitau, Tumas found a group of Lithuanians, including linguist Jonas Jablonskis and attorney Antanas Kriščiukaitis, and often attended their gatherings. Jablonskis approved his first more serious literary experiment – a translation of one of the short stories by Henryk Sienkiewicz – and published it in Varpas. Dean Piotr Walent disapproved such meetings and wanted to control Tumas' activities, but Tumas refused to obey. Their conflict continued until the dean was deported to Simbirsk in January 1895. At the same time, 23 other priests implicated in the Kielce Seminary case were deported to other locations in Russia. Tumas was not satisfied with his posting in Mitau and, after reading a poem by Maironis in spring 1895, sent an emotional letter to the bishop requesting a reassignment. He received a reply in a week, but did not get a new posting until four months later.

In summer 1895, Tumas was assigned as a vicar and a teacher of religion to Mosėdis. He devoted his efforts to the Lithuanian press. In collaboration with priests Felicijonas Lelis and Kazimieras Kazlauskas held in the Kretinga Monastery, Tumas established the monthly magazine Tėvynės sargas (Guardian of the Fatherland) in January 1896. Due to the Lithuanian press ban, it had to be printed in East Prussia and then smuggled into Lithuania. Tumas almost single-handedly edited the magazine from the December 1897 to the April–May 1902 issue. While it was a Catholic publication, it was relatively more liberal than Žemaičių ir Lietuvos apžvalga. It attempted to reconcile the Catholic dogma with the Lithuanian National Revival. While the newspaper promoted the Lithuanian identity (faith, language, culture) and opposed various Russification policies, it did not support political resistance against the Tsarist regime and in general accepted the existing social and political order.

In October 1896, Tumas' brother Jonas was arrested in Priekulė for transporting a suitcase full of booklets printed by Tėvynės sargas. The police also seized letters that implicated others in the book smuggling operation, but Tumas managed to bribe police officials and destroy the letters. Tumas was searched, interrogated, dismissed from his job as a teacher, and sentenced to five years of exile by the Governor-General of Vilnius. His friends, particularly former classmate Antanas Kaupas, encouraged him to flee to United States, but Adomas Jakštas who was deported for five years to Ustyuzhna persuaded him to stay. The Ministry of the Interior did not approve the sentence and it was reduced to a year of house arrest. His brother, caught red handed, could not avoid the punishment and served three years in the Kresty Prison and two years of exile in Bessarabia.

In August 1898, Tumas was transferred to Kuliai. It was a convenient location for Tumas' illegal work – it was remote but also close to the Prussia–Russia border – and he organized a distribution point for the banned Lithuanian press. A local farmer would smuggle the books across the border, Tumas would hide them in the large clergy house until book smugglers such as Jonas Krikščiūnas picked them up for further distribution. To help the distribution, Tumas decided to split Tėvynės sargas into two parts – the first part contained more dangerous political topics and thus could bring harsher sentences, while the second part contained more innocent practical articles on farming, etc. and thus attracted less interest from the police. This magazine was geared towards the common folk and Tumas yearned for a magazine for the intelligentsia. To that end, he published five issues of Žinyčia (Treasury of Knowledge) in 1900–1902. It was a cultural, not political magazine. Tumas was an avid reader. A surviving list of books owned by Tumas in 1899 shows 433 books, acquired since 1894. The list did not include any of the illegal Lithuanian publications and thus should be longer.

=== Troubles with the superiors ===
In 1900, someone wrote an angry article to Ūkininkas (Farmer) about Duke Bogdan Ogiński, owner of the Rietavas Manor. Ogiński suspected that its author was Tumas and complained to bishop Mečislovas Leonardas Paliulionis, who reassigned Tumas to Micaičiai near Kuršėnai in July 1901. Tumas had to leave Tėvynės sargas in care of Antanas Milukas, though continued to be actively involved in its publication and officially resigned as editor in the first issue of 1902. In Micaičiai, Tumas began organizing a charitable society that would maintain a shelter for the poor. His work, commenced without the proper approval of his superiors, and deeply pro-Lithuanian attitudes upset priests from Viekšniai, Kuršėnai, and Šakyna. They wrote complaints to bishop Paliulionis.

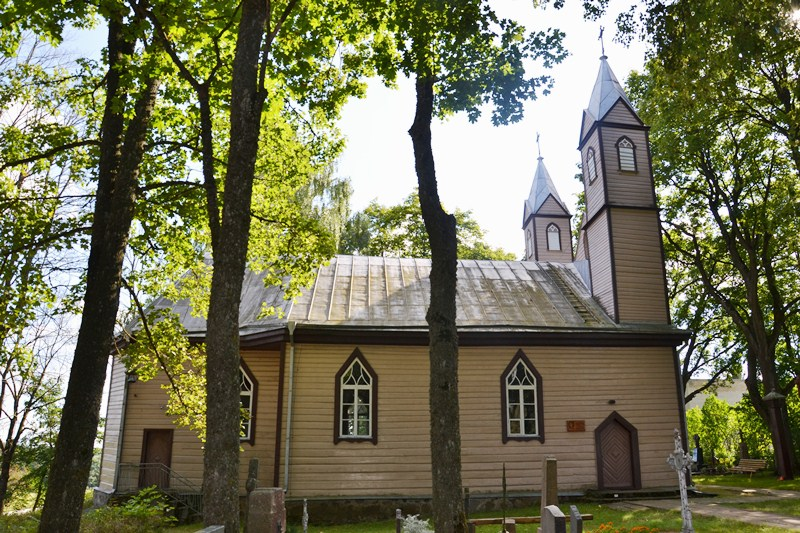
Church of St. John of Nepomuk in Vadaktėliai where Tumas worked in 1902–1905

One of the complaints attacked a translation of a short catechism by Roch Filochowski published by Tumas in 1898 with counterfeited publication data (supposedly, published in 1863 at the Zawadzki Press in Vilnius). The complaint protested that the catechism also counterfeited its approbation (supposedly, by bishop Motiejus Valančius) and that it replaced various Polish loanwords and barbarisms with Lithuanian equivalents. In another complaint, Tumas was attacked for insisting that fellow priests spoke Lithuanian among themselves. As a result, Tumas was reassigned to a small and poor church in Vadaktėliai north of Vadaktai in May 1902. In October 1902, the Samogitian consistory, presided by suffragan bishop Gasparas Cirtautas, debated complaints against Tumas, including that he was a leader of the Lithuanian National Revival, that he published an illegal Lithuanian newspaper and that he traveled widely soliciting contributions and donations to this newspaper. He was largely cleared of the charges, but was put on probation. He was to cease activities not directly related to his clerical duties and was prohibited from printing anything or traveling anywhere without an approval of the bishop.

Tumas, isolated in Vadaktėliai under a watchful eye of fellow priests and police, was still able participate in Lithuanian activities. For example, in 1903, he published a translation of an invitation to the Lithuanian nobility to join the National Revival by Adomas Jakštas in Dirva-Žinynas (Soil-Reference Book) and continued to care for the finances of Tėvynės sargas. He remained in Vadaktėliai despite his friends' suggestions of ways to improve his station – Antanas Milukas urged to emigrate to United States where he could become a parish priest in Hazleton, Pennsylvania, Andrius Dubinskas suggested moving to Riga or Saint Petersburg, and Jakštas proposed to pursue an advanced degree in theology.

=== Russian Revolution of 1905 ===
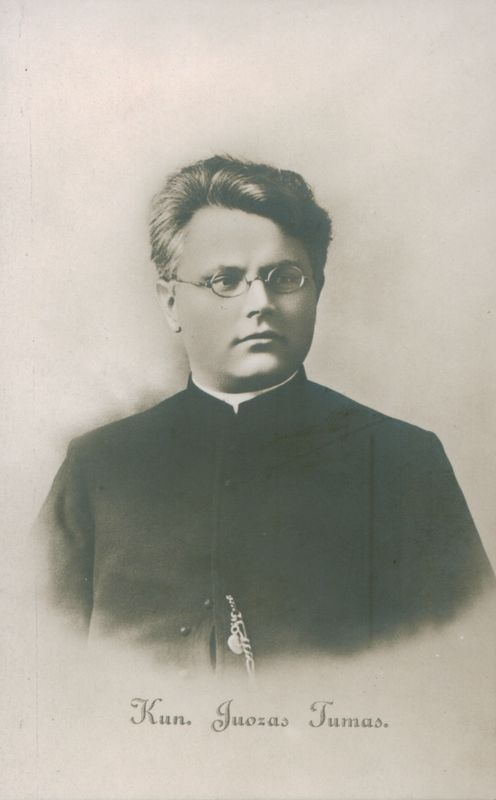
Postcard of Tumas (c. 1909)

The outbreak of the Russo-Japanese War forced the Tsarist government to make concessions to ethnic minorities and the Lithuanian press ban was lifted in April 1904. He met the news with plans for a publication on ethnography, one of his many interests boosted by a visit from Finnish ethnographer Axel Heikel. He published a call in Vilniaus žinios (News of Vilnius) for the publication to be edited by Jonas Jablonskis, but the plans remained unrealized.

During the Russian Revolution of 1905, before the Great Seimas of Vilnius in December 1905, he visited all Lithuanian dioceses (Samogitia, Vilnius, and Sejny) as well as the Saint Petersburg Roman Catholic Theological Academy organizing the priests. At the seimas, he was elected to its presidium, but resigned giving up his seat to Pranciškus Būčys. He delivered a speech promoting non-violent resistance to the Tsarist regime and cited the example of Finland. At the seimas, priests organized the Lithuanian Christian Democratic Union, predecessor of the Lithuanian Christian Democratic Party, and Tumas petitioned bishop Eduard von der Ropp to remain in Vilnius as union's representative, but the bishop rejected the request. Tumas returned to Vadaktėliai and organized a local chapter of the union. He also proposed regulations protecting manor workers – some of the ideas were later incorporated into a national law, drafted by Mykolas Krupavičius, Minister of Agriculture from 1923 to 1926.

Upon learning of such activities, bishop Paliulionis urgently reassigned Tumas to Sidabravas in December 1905 and to Stakiai in March 1906. Due to the relocation, he skipped the election to the first Russian State Duma. He was also arrested before moving to Stakiai, but released on bail. He helped Vincas Mickevičius-Kapsukas, future Soviet revolutionary, hide from the Tsarist police. In Stakiai, which was particularly remote (10 kilometres (6.2 mi) to the nearest school and 18 kilometres (11 mi) to the nearest town), Tumas mostly took care of the church's farm and organized a purchase of phosphate fertilisers for the entire village to use.

=== Vilniaus žinios and Viltis ===
Petras Vileišis, the publisher of the daily Vilniaus žinios (News of Vilnius), suffered financial difficulties and searched for ways to increase the newspaper's circulation. He enlisted the clergy to help the newspaper and they searched for a new editor among the priests. The younger priests advocated for Tumas, particularly given his editorial experience with Tėvynės sargas. Reluctantly, bishops Paliulionis and von der Ropp agreed to transfer Tumas to Vilnius to work on the newspaper. He was promised a monthly salary of 75 rubles, but he was hesitant to take the offer. He cautioned that he was arrogant, short-tempered, and held strong convictions and opinions. He penned a declaration of principles that he would try to adhere to as the new editor. Vilniaus žinios was to be a liberal nationalist Catholic publication advocating for the Lithuanian autonomy within the Russian Empire. It would not be socialist, but it would treat all social classes equally. It would defend the Catholic faith as the foundation of the order and morality and the Lithuanian nation as an equal to others. Tumas left Stakiai in February 1907 and edited the newspaper until it briefly stopped the publication in April 1907. During that short time, Tumas wrote many articles on various topics, including on education, art, economy.

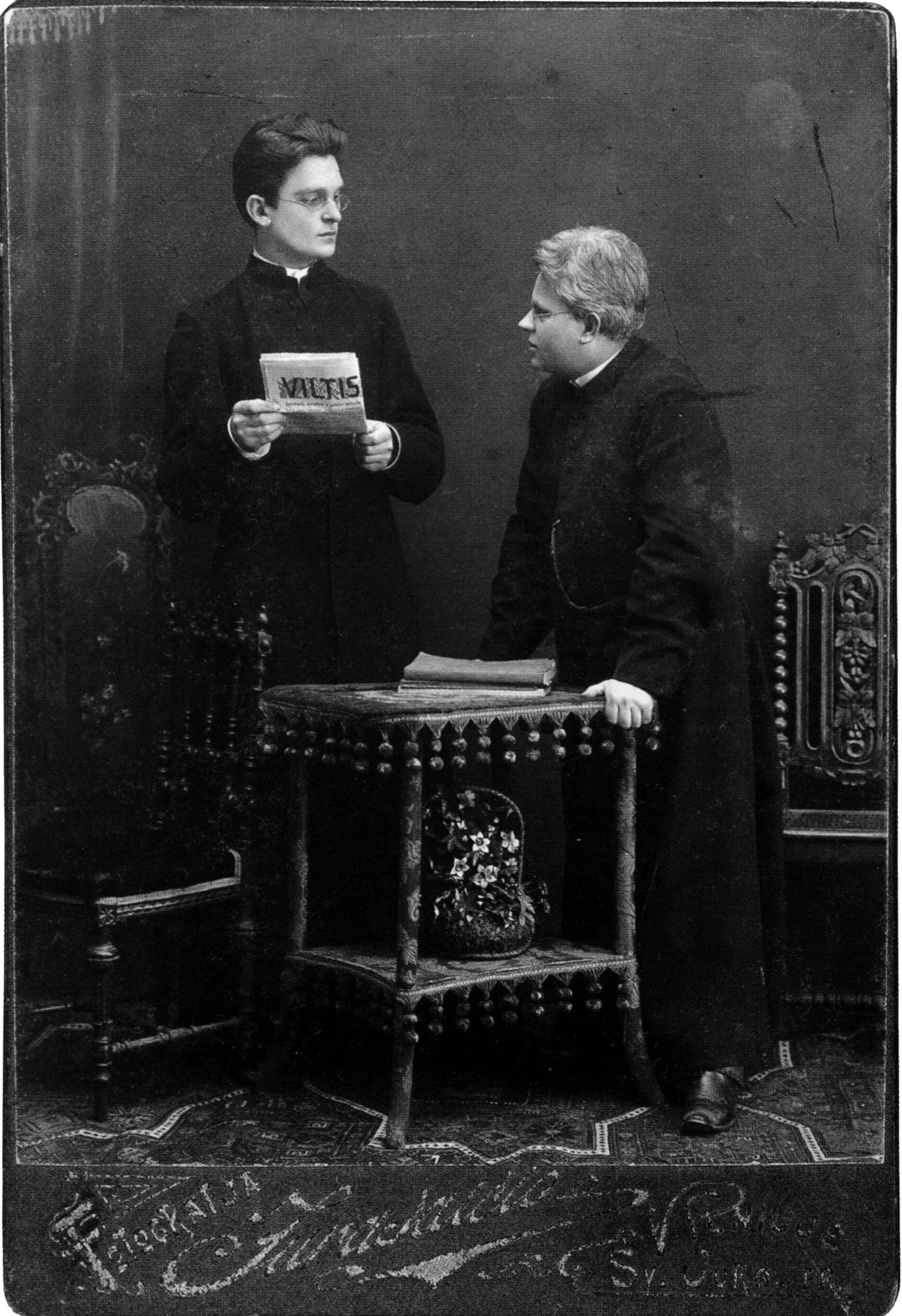
Tumas (right) transfers Viltis to its new editor Fabijonas Kemėšis (left) in 1911

When Vilniaus žinios was briefly discontinued due to financial difficulties, Tumas and his co-editor Antanas Smetona organized the publication of Viltis (Hope), a new newspaper that hoped to unite conservative Catholic clergy and more liberal intelligentsia for the common good of the Lithuanian nation. Tumas traveled across Lithuania agitating priests to support the endeavor and managed to sign up 179 shareholders who each agreed to contribute 100 rubles annually to the trust company set up to publish the newspaper. The first issue appeared in October 1907. While Smetona was influential setting the ideology, he had a full-time job at the Vilnius Land Bank and thus Tumas handled most of the day-to-day workings of the publication. Published three times a week, Viltis concentrated on cultural matters as opposed to politics or news reports, paying particular attention to the Lithuanian language and folk culture as well as issues in art, science, education, and morals. Tumas wrote reviews of literary and scientific works.

Tumas was also active in Lithuanian cultural life in Vilnius. He was a board member of the Lithuanian Scientific Society and gifted some of his personal book collection to its new library. He was also a member of the Lithuanian Art Society and participated in the cultural Rūta Society. In July 1910, Tumas traveled as a correspondent to the official opening of the Grunwald Monument in Kraków during the celebration of the 500th anniversary of the Battle of Grunwald. His critical article was published in the Ukrainian newspaper Dilo. He contrasted the celebration, attended by many dignitaries, with Estonian and Latvian Song Festivals and concluded that the Grunwald celebration did not sufficiently involve all social classes. The Polish press responded by attacking Tumas and accusing him of anti-Polish attitudes.

Viltis had a permanent column to report on the situation of Lithuanian Catholics in the Diocese of Vilnius and in particular on their fight for the Lithuanian-language church services. In November 1910, Tumas published an article listing known churches where Lithuanian-language services were removed by orders of Kazimierz Mikołaj Michalkiewicz, administrator of the Diocese of Vilnius while Bishop von der Ropp was in exile. This caused much controversy and, in February 1911, bishop Gaspar Felicjan Cyrtowt assigned Tumas to Laižuva in northern Lithuania. Effectively, it was an exile and also meant his departure from Viltis. His place was taken by other priests, Fabijonas Kemėšis and later Juozas Dabužis. Various Lithuanian groups sent letters protesting the removal of Tumas-Vaižgantas to Viltis for three months.

=== Exile to Laižuva ===
Tumas arrived to Laižuva on 1 March 1911. Just three months later, in May, priest Konstantinas Olšauskas invited him to visit Lithuanian American communities and collect donations for the construction of the headquarters of the Saulė Society which organized Lithuanian schools in the Kovno Governorate. Aboard the SS Kronprinzessin Cecilie they arrived to New York on 5 July. They toured 55 Lithuanian American communities for three months and collected about $19,000 (equivalent to $657,000 in 2025) or 34,000 rubles. More donations were collected in Lithuania and the headquarters, a three-storey brick building at a cost of 155,000 rubles, was completed in Žaliakalnis in 1914. Upon the return, Tumas visited various Lithuanian towns and delivered over thirty speeches against emigration to the United States sharing stories of the difficult conditions and poverty of Lithuanian Americans. In 1912, these lectures were published as a separate booklet by the Society of Saint Casimir.

In 1912, Tumas was offered to move to Riga to work as an editor of Rygos garsas (Sound of Riga) and encouraged to run for the Russian State Duma. However, he refused in part due to debts and ill health. He did participate in the Duma elections, helping to elect Lithuanian candidates, including Martynas Yčas. During 1912, Tumas suffered from a depressive episode or neurasthenia. He also nursed his nephew Kazys Mėginis who died of tuberculosis in spring 1913. After his death, Tumas' attention shifted from journalism to literary work. He collected his previous works, edited them for style and language, and published in various Lithuanian newspapers hoping to publish them as separate booklets. In August 1913, Tumas, as a correspondent of Viltis, participated in the opening of the Estonia Theatre in Tallinn. When a conflict with the conservative clergy forced Antanas Smetona to resign from Viltis in September 1913, he established a new publication Vairas (Rudder) to continue the same ideology as the original Viltis. Tumas contributed his best works to Vairas with only a few submissions to Viltis.

=== During World War I ===
In summer 1914, Juozapas Bikinas, editor of Rygos garsas and former contributor to Tėvynės sargas, visited Tumas in Laižuva and offered him to become co-editor of the newspaper published in Riga. At the time, about 50,000 Lithuanians lived in Riga. New bishop Pranciškus Karevičius supported the effort and even found a priest that would buy Tumas' farm so that he could repay his debts. Tumas arrived to Riga in December 1914 and lived at the clergy house of the Our Lady of Sorrows Church. He was promised a salary of 30 rubles a month for his editorial work, but due to financial difficulties did not receive it. Rygos garsas was a four-page newspaper published twice a week. Bikinas edited news and political articles, while Tumas edited articles on cultural and societal matters. To address war-time demand for news, the publication frequency was increased to three times a week and the circulation reached 13,000 copies.

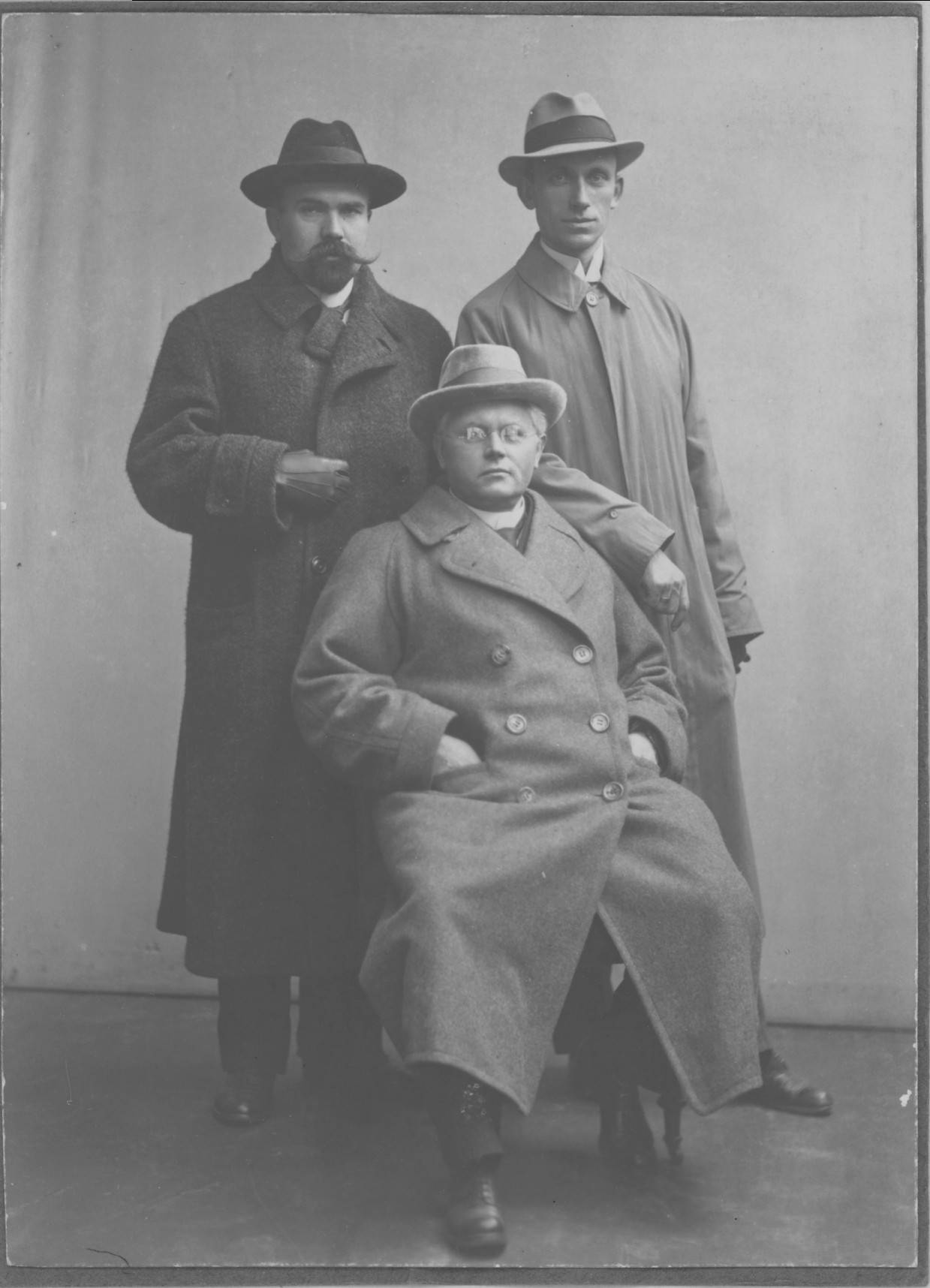
Tumas (sitting), Martynas Yčas (left) and Jurgis Savickis (right) in Stockholm in 1918

With the German attack in the Second Battle of the Masurian Lakes in February 1915, Lithuanian war refugees began arriving to Riga. Tumas and others organized refugee relief – opening shelters and soup kitchens, providing clothes and basic medical care, finding employment. Tumas and Pranas Mašiotas became representatives of the Lithuanian Society for the Relief of War Sufferers. In his fundraising efforts, Tumas met with various Latvian activists, including Jānis Čakste and Alberts Kviesis, future Presidents of Latvia. In five months, Lithuanians in Riga raised 10,314 rubles and helped some 4,000 refugees. When, as a result of the Great Retreat, German army took control of Lithuania in September 1915, the Lithuanian Society for the Relief of War Sufferers split into two sections – one remained in Vilnius and the other evacuated to Saint Petersburg. Tumas was invited to become the general manager of the Saint Petersburg section, but quickly relinquished the duties as he was ill-suited for an office job. Instead, he traveled across Russia visiting Lithuanian refugees in Tambov, Crimea, Kursk, Tver, and elsewhere. He also wrote and published fiction works (four booklets in 1915–1916) and translated booklets for children (three works in 1917). During the summer 1916 vacation in Voronezh, Tumas delivered a series of lectures to Lithuanian teachers at evacuated Lithuanian schools on Lithuanian writers and literature and planned on publishing the lectures as a separate book.

Lithuanians became more politically active, particularly after the February Revolution, working to secure Lithuania's future after the war. Together with Juozas Kubilius and Liudas Noreika, both former contributors to Viltis, Tumas established the Party of National Progress in 1916, but it became publicly active in early 1917. The party essentially adopted the same ideology as Viltis – represent the middle (nationalist) road between socialists and Christian democrats. In February 1917, Tumas was elected to the Council of the Lithuanian Nation, which aspired to become an authoritative body that could represent all Lithuanians and their political objectives. The council decided to organize a political conference, known as the Petrograd Seimas, in June 1917. Tumas traveled to Riga to help elect six representatives of the Party of National Progress to the Seimas (in total, the party had 20 representatives at the Seimas) and to Mogilev to convince Petras Kraujalis not to hold a separate Catholic conference. The Seimas was a raucous affair with passionate disagreements whether Lithuanians should demand full independence or autonomy within the Russian Empire. Tumas and other members of his party called for full independence. Their resolution won by a narrow margin of vote, but the opponents could not accept it and withdrew from the Seimas splintering the Council of the Lithuanian Nation. It was a severe blow to Tumas and his life-long work to unite Lithuanians for the common good of the Lithuanian nation.

Tumas was delegated to the Congress of the Peoples of Russia organized by the Ukrainian Central Rada in Kiev in September 1917. Lithuanians, represented by nine men, including Augustinas Voldemaras and Antanas Tumėnas, were the only participating ethnic group to demand full independence. Upon return, together with Stasys Šilingas and Jurgis Alekna, he was sent to the Lithuanian Conference in Stockholm in October 1917. The conference approved the resolution adopted by the Vilnius Conference, recognized the Council of Lithuania as the legitimate representative of the Lithuanian nation, and reiterated Lithuania's desire for full independence. Tumas decided not to return to Russia, but instead travel back to Lithuania. The required paperwork took seven months and Tumas devoted most of his time to writing Pragiedruliai.

=== In independent Lithuania ===
==== Newspaper editor and political activities ====
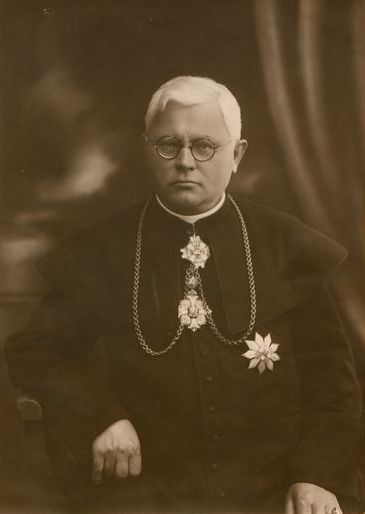
Tumas in 1928 wearing the cross of the Samogitian Capitulum and the Order of the Lithuanian Grand Duke Gediminas

Tumas returned to Vilnius in May 1918. He started writing articles for Lietuvos aidas (Echo of Lithuania), eventually taking over as editor from Petras Klimas, and attending the sessions of the Council of Lithuania as a guest. At the outbreak of the Lithuanian–Soviet War, many Lithuanian institutions evacuated to Kaunas but Tumas remained in the city. He was a member of the Lithuanian delegation to Vincas Kapsukas, leader of the Lithuanian Soviet Socialist Republic, in attempt to find a modus vivendi. Vaclovas Biržiška, the Commissar of Education, supported Lithuanian activities and employed Tumas as a translator of educational books. Only one by Ekaterina Yanzhul was actually published. Tumas contracted typhus and was ill when Polish army captured Vilnius during the Polish–Soviet War in April 1919. Upon recovery, he edited and helped publish Nepriklausomoji Lietuva (Independent Lithuania). In his articles, he harshly criticized the new Polish administration, in particular before it enforced censorship. Several of his articles attacked Polish priest Stanisław Maciejewicz, a deputy of the Polish Legislative Sejm. Maciejewicz accused Tumas of libel and initiated a case in the ecclesiastical court of the Diocese of Vilnius, but later abandoned it.

In early 1920, Antanas Smetona invited Tumas to Kaunas to become editor of Tauta (Nation) published by the Party of National Progress. He moved to Kaunas in March 1920 and ran in the elections to the Constituent Assembly of Lithuania. He visited five volosts and delivered eight speeches, but was not elected and largely withdrew from politics. He continued to support Antanas Smetona and the Lithuanian Nationalist Union for which he was frequently criticized by the Lithuanian Christian Democratic Party. On 11 November 1923, during an intermission at the Kaunas City Theatre, Tumas publicly addressed Aleksandras Stulginskis, President of Lithuania, asking him to pardon Smetona, who at the time served a prison sentence for criticizing the government. The play was canceled and Tumas received a public reprimand from the bishop and a symbolic one-day house arrest for public disturbance from the Kaunas District Peace Court. Tumas submitted clemency requests on behalf of many others, including Kostas Korsakas.

Tumas joined the Lithuanian Riflemen's Union and became temporary editor of its magazine Trimitas. In January 1921, eleven older Lithuanian activists, including Kazys Grinius, Jonas Jablonskis, and Maironis, decided to publish an irregular publication with their memoirs of the Lithuanian National Revival and other articles on the history of Lithuania. Tumas became the editor of Mūsų senovė (Our Past) and with funding from the Ministry of Education published five volumes (865 pages) in 1921–1922. It was the ninth and last publication edited by Tumas. However, he continued to contribute articles to numerous, including social democratic, newspapers.

==== Church rector and university docent ====
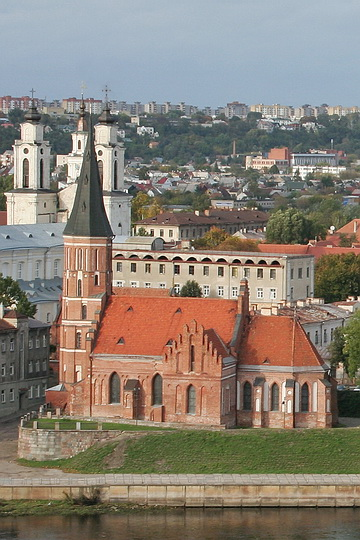
Tumas restored the Church of Vytautas the Great and was its rector from 1920 to 1933

In March 1920, Tumas also became rector of Church of Vytautas the Great. It was his ninth and last parish. The church, funded by the Grand Duke Vytautas, was devastated during World War I and needed extensive repairs. Tumas solicited donations, hired workers for repairs and artists Paulius Galaunė, Petras Kalpokas, Alfonsas Janulis for decoration. The church was reconsecrated on 15 August 1920 by Adomas Jakštas, but repairs continued for years. It was not a parish church, but Tumas was often asked to perform weddings, baptisms, last rites. Many requested his services, because he was more lenient and accommodating. For example, in 1921, he wed poet Petras Vaičiūnas at the break of dawn since dawn was a key symbol in Vaičiūnas' poetry. In ten years, from 1920 to 1930, Tumas wed 1,375 couples. He resigned from the church due to poor health in January 1933 and delivered the last sermon on 16 February.

Over the years, Tumas had collected information on Lithuanian writers and literature. In 1921–1922, he lectured on topics in Lithuanian literature at the Higher Officers' Courses and a teachers' courses. He was also invited to teach at the War School of Kaunas, but refused due to lack of time. Tumas was invited by Vincas Krėvė-Mickevičius to teach at the newly established University of Lithuania. He started with a lecture on the poetry of Maironis in the fall 1922 semester. His lack of higher education was an obstacle and he was promoted to docent only in June 1924. He taught a course on the Lithuanian literature during the Lithuanian press ban (1864–1904). He chose to discuss different writers every semester instead of a more systematic chronological or thematic approach. He lectured not only on the well-known (such as Antanas Baranauskas or Žemaitė) but also on virtually forgotten authors. He retired from the university in March 1929 due to poor health (throat and lung issues made it difficult to speak for long periods of time). The university awarded him a pension and an honorary doctorate. He returned to the university for the spring 1932 semester when he taught a class on Lithuanian women writers.

==== Other public work and death ====
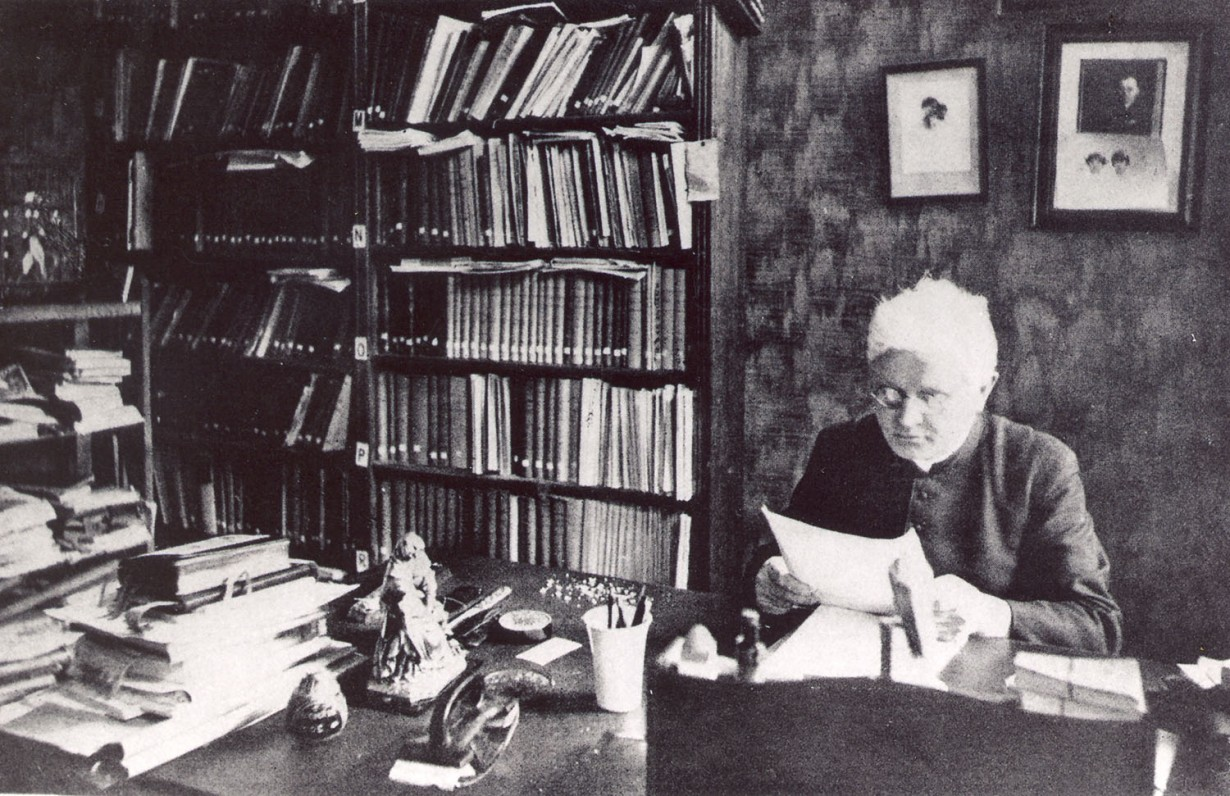
Tumas in his study in 1931

Tumas was instrumental in establishing a literary archive at the university that collected writers' manuscripts, correspondence, photos, etc. Tumas donated most of his personal collection to this archive, officially established in March 1923. In 1924–1926, Tumas worked as a reviewer of books and educational materials for the Ministry of Education. During that time he reviewed 66 works. He also contributed biographical articles to Lietuviškoji enciklopedija, the first Lithuanian-language encyclopedia. Tumas frequently traveled across Lithuania and internationally, including to Italy in 1931 and to Latvia and Sweden in 1932.

In addition to his paid jobs, Tumas was very active in Lithuanian cultural life – he was chairman, treasurer, or board members of various Lithuanian societies, committees, and commissions, about 20 different organizations in total. He was a member of the Lithuanian Riflemen's Union and was awarded its Riflemen's Star. He was a member and, for a period, secretary of the Lithuanian Catholic Academy of Science and treasurer of the book publishing company Universitetas. In 1932, he was elected chairman of the Lithuanian Writers' Union. He actively supported and was elected as honorary member of Neo-Lithuania, a nationalist student organization at the university, and was spiritual adviser to Young Lithuania, youth organization of the Lithuanian Nationalist Union. He received numerous visitors asking him for donations, loans, or personal recommendations. Despite all of these activities, he still found time to write works of fiction, though his ability to write longer works was impeded.

In independent Lithuania, Tumas' efforts and works received official recognition. He was promoted as honorary canon of the Samogitian Capitulum in April 1921. He was awarded the Order of the Lithuanian Grand Duke Gediminas (2nd degree) on 15 May 1928, and the Order of Vytautas the Great (2nd degree) in 1932. He also received the Latvian Order of the Three Stars (2nd degree).

Tumas supervised the construction of the villa of his nephew-in-law Petras Klimas in Ąžuolynas and spent his last months there. In January 1933, Tumas was diagnosed with vitamin B12 deficiency anemia caused by colitis. In early March, he was diagnosed with bronchitis which grew into pneumonia. He spent the last week bedridden and died in the evening of 29 April 1933. He was buried at the Church of Vytautas the Great. His funeral, a grand public affair attended by many dignitaries, was a subject to one of the first documentaries produced in Lithuania.

== Works ==
=== Fiction ===
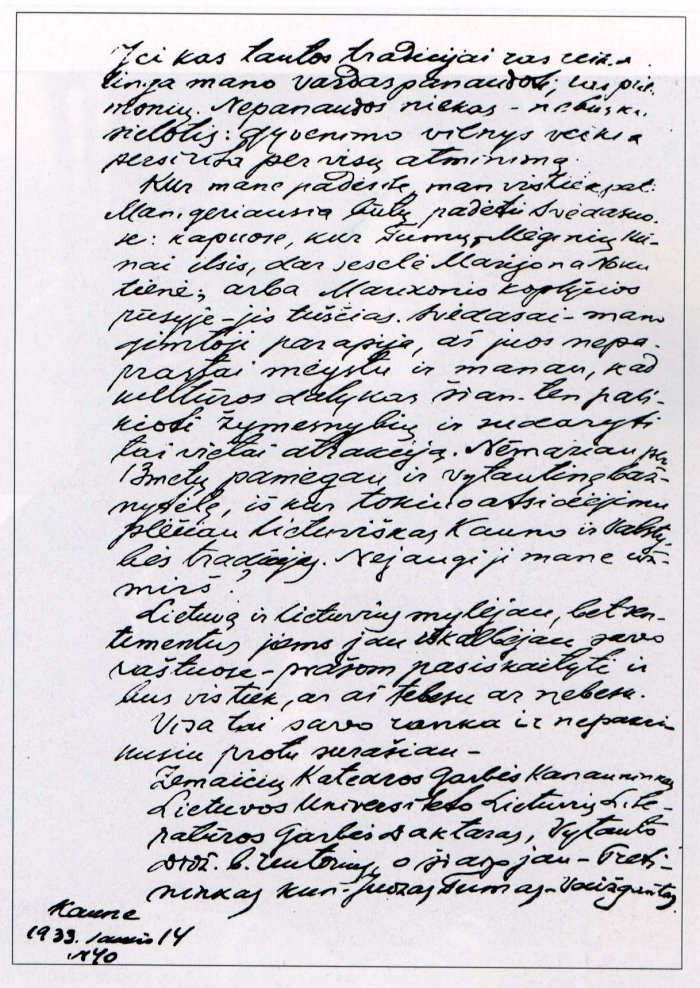
Last page of Tumas' last will dated 14 January 1933

Tumas began publishing works of fiction in 1897. They were first published as a separate booklet Vaizdeliai (Scenes) in 1902. He signed by the pen name Vaižgantas, the name of a god of flax and hemp in the Lithuanian mythology mentioned by Jan Łasicki. Until 1915, he wrote several cycles. Scenos vaizdai (Stage Scenes) was a cycle of plays poking fun at the shortcomings of the ordinary village folk (first published in 1906 and 1915). Aukštaičių vaizdeliai (Scenes of Aukštaičiai) was a cycle of autobiographical short stories. Alegorijų vaizdai (Allegorical Scenes) included political and didactic stories (first published in 1916). Karo vaizdai (Scenes of War) were written during World War I and focused on the effects of war on the civilian population (first published in 1915). The best known story from this period is Rimai ir Nerimai (The Rimas and Nerimas Families), a tragicomedy depicting a comic rivalry between two families that is brought to an end by a common tragedy (their sons are mobilized into the Imperial Russian Army and killed in the war).

He wrote the two-volume (first volume in two parts devoted to Samogitia, the second volume to Aukštaitija) epic novel Pragiedruliai (Cloud Clearing) in 1917–1920. It depicts the Lithuanian National Revival, social and economic transformation in rural Lithuania, and the resistance, sometimes subconscious, to the Tsarist regime by the ordinary villagers – from improved agricultural methods to sending children to school, reading prohibited Lithuanian literature, and becoming interested in politics. The novel does not have a linear plot or structure. From separate scenes, pictures of nature, ethnographic descriptions of festivals or clothing, local legends and folktales, the novel builds a mosaic of the spiritual pulse of the nation – its languishing memory of serfdom, spreading education, improving economic conditions, maturing political involvement, developing national consciousness. Lithuanians are depicted as one large family working towards the same goal. The novel has a large cast or characters, including Lithuanian peasants, industrious Jews, Polonized gentry, Russian administrators. The final scenes of Gondingos kraštas depict a double marriage that contains borrowed elements from Pan Tadeusz by Adam Mickiewicz. Overall, it is a rather optimistic work that, while acknowledging painful setbacks and individual sacrifices, celebrates the cultural progress. While it is considered the best work of Tumas and was quickly added to school curriculum, not everyone praised it. For example, Liudas Gira considered it to be boring, confusing, and difficult to understand, particularly for the urban residents.

After Lithuania's independence in 1918, Tumas' fiction turned from public to individual life. His novel Dėdės ir dėdienės (Uncles and Aunts), published in 1920–1921, explores three tragic lives. Mykoliukas, the younger son, sacrifices everything, including his love for Severija, for his elder brother and his family. He works the brother's farm essentially as a slave, earning nothing of his own, and is compared to Saint Isidore the Laborer. Severija marries Rapolas, an older man working as supervisor at a local manor. After the Emancipation reform of 1861, Rapolas loses his job and, unable to earn his own farm due to his laziness, moves in with his brother. He dies after accidentally eating rat poison. Severija works hard trying to earn her and her husband's keep at the unwelcoming home of her brother-in-law. After her husband's death, she is left all alone and starts abusing alcohol. The novel was adapted into a film, Tas prakeiktas nuolankumas (The Damn Submissive) in 1970.

After his retirement from the University of Lithuania, Tumas was able to devote more time to fiction. Didactic novel Šeimos vėžiai (Tracks of a Family; 1929) looks into a family of Lithuanian intellectuals and their choices between an "empty" life of a cushy job and romantic love or a "meaningful" life of work for the Lithuanian nation. It was meant to become the third volume of Pragiedruliai. Short story Išgama (Freak; 1929) tells a true story from Tumas' childhood – a boy who liked to daydream and maybe could have become an artist, but his father beat him and called him a freak for being different and not interested in farm work. The boy ran away from home and was killed trying to steal horses. Nebylys (Mute; 1930) deals with a love triangle that turns two childhood friends into rivals and enemies. It ends with the murder of one of the friends, katorga for the other, and insanity for their love interest. The story was adapted into a theater play in 1970 and a TV play in 1980. Tumas' last major work, Žemaičių Robinzonas (Samogitian Robinson; 1932), explores the life of Vincas, an energetic orphan who builds a prosperous farm with his own hands. But his family is infertile and he starts drinking alcohol. Vincas tries public work – construction of a church and serving as a starshina of his volost – to no avail.

Unlike many other writers of the period, Tumas did not dwell on the heroic past (i.e. romantic nationalism) and instead focused on the present-day. His characters and plots were borrowed directly from his own experience or from witnesses. His characters often struggle with worldly passions (e.g. alcoholism, sexual desire, greed). Tumas, while depicting everyday life, expressed deeper romantic ideas and ideals. One of the key ideas is public service and hard work – those who sacrifice their narrow self-interests and passions and diligently work for their families or the public good find meaning and salvation, while others fall to misery and degradation. Thus work becomes a greater moral virtue. The narrator, Tumas' alter ego, often interrupts the story to offer his emotional and expressive judgement or opinion. While Tumas considered himself to be a romantic writer, his works combine elements of various styles (romanticism and realism, fiction and non-fiction). His writing style is thick and heavy, verbose, full of Lithuanian folk motives and wit. He tried to use the standard Lithuanian instead of his native Aukštaitian dialect, but he freely coined neologisms and used dialects and loanwords when he wanted to be more expressive. His peculiar style is often described with the adjective vaižgantiškas. As a unique writer, Tumas is usually not discussed when discussing general trends in the Lithuanian literature but receives considerable critical attention.

=== Non-fiction ===
Tumas was a prolific writer. He edited and published 19 volumes of his collected works. Since 1994, the Institute of Lithuanian Literature and Folklore has been working on publishing his collected works. 24 volumes were published by 2015 with 30 volumes planned in total. He wrote on a variety of topics in various genres (e.g. editorials, feuilletons, reviews), often producing several articles day. He wrote more than 150 obituaries of Lithuanian priests alone. In total, Tumas contributed articles to more than 80 different periodicals. In addition, Tumas wrote thousands of letters, only 700–800 of which survive.

Tumas worked on publishing various religious literature. In 1898, he translated and published a short and simple catechism by Roch Filochowski. In 1904, it was republished for the third time. He published a collection of sermons by priest Antanas Bortkevičius in 1901 and a work on teetotalism by bishop Motiejus Valančius in 1915. He translated, but did not publish, a textbook on the study of the Gospel of Mark by Baron Pavel Nikolayevich Nikolai. He also assisted Juozapas Skvireckas with the first full Bible translation into Lithuanian (raised funds, proofread manuscripts, wrote an introduction). In 1929, he translated and published two further works by Valančius – polemic writings on Eastern Orthodoxy and autobiography.

From the early years, Tumas collected manuscripts and biographical data of various Lithuanian writers and whenever possible published them. For example, poetry of Anupras Jasevičius is known only from materials published by Tumas. He published obituaries and other biographical articles on Antanas Strazdas, Vincas Kudirka, Jonas Biliūnas, Kazimieras Jaunius, Maironis, and many others. These informal studies became impetus for his university career. His university lectures were published in various newspapers and magazines, eleven separate booklets in 1924–1925, and four-volumes in 1929. However, these studies were not systematic – Tumas grouped topics haphazardly, without regard to chronology or author's style, covering some authors in detail while skipping others entirely. He focused on biographies and not on literary works. Since he knew or worked with many of them, he provided many irrelevant anecdotal stories. Tumas himself considered his lectures not a history of the Lithuanian literature, but only material for such history.

In 1919, he published a travel book Aplink Baltiją (Around the Baltic Sea). It was based on articles he published promoting the idea of a federation with Latvia, Estonia, Sweden, or Finland. In 1925, he published Jaunam veikėjui (To the Young Activist) with twenty essays on religious and public work. These essays could be classified as pastoral theology – friendly, informal, practical advice from Tumas to young priests without citations to theological works or the Bible.

== Legacy ==
Vaižgantas was known for encouraging younger authors and celebrating any accomplishments or signs of progress, and is sometimes referred to as "the diamond hunter" (deimančiukų ieškotojas) even if some of those diamonds would quickly turn out to be simple gravel. He is remembered as an energetic activists who lived according to the motto "love and be loved". In 2016, Seimas (Lithuanian parliament) declared 2019 the year of Tumas (it will be his 150th birth anniversary).

In April 1934, a year after Tumas' death, Vytautas Magnus University allotted three rooms to a museum dedicated to Tumas. This museum, directed by Vincas Mykolaitis-Putinas, preserved Tumas' archives, furniture, household items, and library of more than 2,000 volumes. When the university was closed in 1942, Mykolaitis-Putinas took some of the photos and manuscripts to Vilnius University and the rest were purchased by the Maironis Museum. The items were held in storage until 1997 when a museum dedicated to Tumas was established in the Kaunas apartment where he lived and worked from 1920 until 1933. It is visited by about 4,500 people annually. Prior to becoming a museum, the apartment was used as a clergy house and its last resident was Ričardas Mikutavičius.

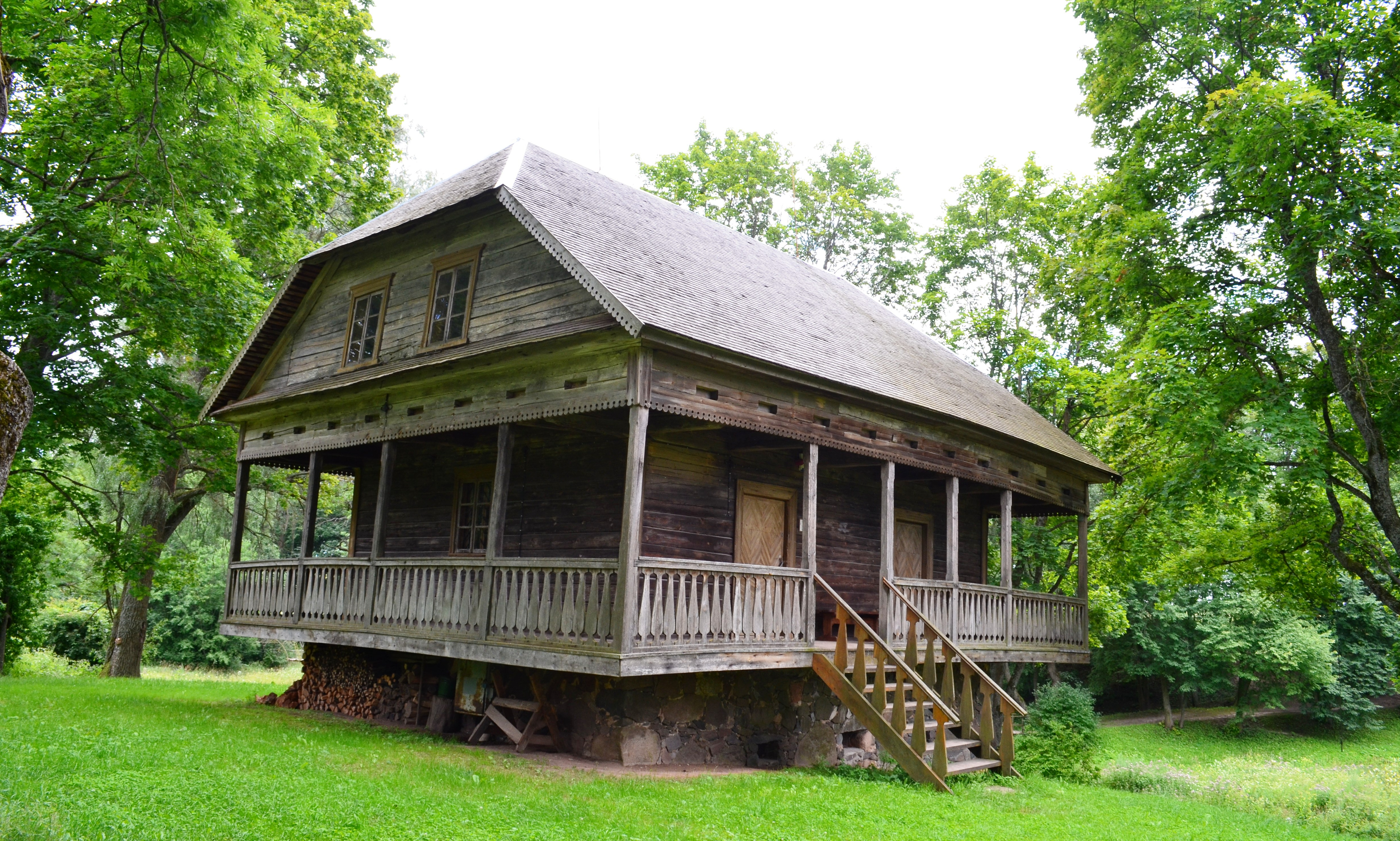
Former granary in Ustronė, now a museum dedicated to Tumas and book smugglers

In 1987–1991, a museum dedicated to Tumas and book smugglers was established in Ustronė, Panevėžys District Municipality. It occupies a former granary that was used by the Garšviai Book Smuggling Society to hide illegal books. Tumas visited the granary while he worked in Vadaktėliai in 1902–1905. Monuments to Tumas were unveiled in Svėdasai in 1937, in his native Maleišiai in 1989, and in Birštonas in 2016. The house where Tumas was born did not survive in its original location – it was sold in 1914 and moved to the nearby Kalviai village. There have been suggestions of purchasing the surviving house, moving it back to Maleišiai, and establishing a memorial museum.

He was a subject of several monographs, including by Aleksandras Merkelis (published in 1934, republished in 1955 and 1989) focusing on his biography and activities, by Aldona Vaitiekūnienė (1982) and Algimantas Radzevičius (1987) focusing on his literary works, by Nijolė Lietuvninkaitė (2015) focusing on his personal library. A collection of his letters to the Klimai family was published in 1998; Aistė Kučinskienė completed her PhD thesis on Tumas' letters in 2016. A book with memoirs and essays about Tumas was published in 2009 (editor Alfas Pakėnas).

In 1994, Kostas Ostrauskas published monodrama Vaižgantas. Over the next two decades it was performed by actor Ferdinandas Jakšys over a thousand times. Schools named after Tumas are located in Rokiškis (1933–1958 and since 1989), Radviliškis (since 1993), Svėdasai (since 1989), Kaunas (since 1999). About 24 streets in Lithuania, 15 in cities and 9 in towns, are named in honor of Tumas, including central streets in Plungė and Tauragė. Since 1991, Svėdasai hosts annual literary events at the end of September. Since 2002, during these events, the Lithuanian Writers' Union and the Lithuanian Journalists' Union present a joint Juozas Tumas-Vaižgantas Award to writers that successfully combine and balance writing fiction and journalist work.

On 20 September 2019, celebrating the 150th birth anniversary of Juozas Tumas-Vaižgantas, a monument for him and his dog Kaukas was unveiled near the Church of Vytautas the Great in Kaunas, Lithuania.

== Bibliography ==
- Anykšta (28 December 2016). "Malaišiai dvelkia Vaižganto laisvės ir poetiškumo dvasia" (in Lithuanian).
- Bagdonas, Matas (4 May 1933). "A. a. kan. Juozas Tumas-Vaižgantas". Trimitas (in Lithuanian). 18. ISSN 1392-4753.
- Bernotienė, Gintarė (2013-12-16). "Juozas Tumas-Vaižgantas". Visuotinė lietuvių enciklopedija (in Lithuanian). Mokslo ir enciklopedijų leidybos centras.
- Brazaitienė, Alvyra. "J. Tumo-Vaižganto muziejaus-buto rinkinys" (in Lithuanian). Maironis Lithuanian Literature Museum.
- Čepėnas, Pranas (1986). Naujųjų laikų Lietuvos istorija (in Lithuanian). Vol. II. Chicago: Dr. Kazio Griniaus Fondas. OCLC 3220435.
- Dambrauskas-Jakštas, Aleksandras (1930). Užgesę žiburiai (PDF) (in Lithuanian). Lietuvių katalikų mokslo akademija. OCLC 492798171.
- Grigaravičius, Algirdas (2009). "Nesantaikos laikai: Vilties redaktoriaus Antano Smetonos pasitraukimas". Kultūros Barai (in Lithuanian). 10. ISSN 0134-3106.
- Grigaravičius, Algirdas (2013). "Politinė lietuvių veikla Rusijoje 1917 metais". Darbai Ir Dienos (in Lithuanian). 60: 23–72. doi:10.7220/2335-8769.60.2. ISSN 1392-0588.
- Grinevičiūtė, Agnė (18 October 2016). "Vaižganto laiškus tyrinėjusi VU mokslininkė: "Jie atspindi visą to meto buitį ir būtį"" (in Lithuanian). Bernardinai.lt.
- Grinius, Jonas (1977). Veidai ir problemos lietuvių literatūroje (PDF) (in Lithuanian). Vol. II. Rome: Lietuvių katalikų mokslo akademija. OCLC 6154597.
- Kazlauskas, Gvidas (21 February 2017). "Kauno skola Vaižgantui". Lietuvos Aidas (in Lithuanian). ISSN 1648-4215.
- Kvietkauskas, Mindaugas (2006). "Tapatybės virsmo istorija: Vaižganto Pragiedruliai ir 1918–1920 m. konfliktas dėl Vilniaus". Literatūra (in Lithuanian). 5 (48). ISSN 0258-0802.
- Kučinskienė, Aistė (2013). "Kas (su)kūrė Vaižgantą? Autoriaus figūros interpretacijų apžvalga" (PDF). Colloquia (in Lithuanian). 30. ISSN 1822-3737.
- Kučinskienė, Aistė (2016). Juozo Tumo-Vaižganto epistolinis diskursas (PDF) (PhD thesis) (in Lithuanian). Vilniaus universitetas, Lietuvių literatūros ir tautosakos institutas.
- Lanskoronskytė, Vaiva (18 May 2015). "Viešnagė Vaižganto namuose – dar kartą apie "deimančiukų" sėją ir rinkimą" (in Lithuanian). Bernardinai.lt.
- Liepaitė, Inga (2016). "Pirmoji lietuvos rašytojo asmeninei bibliotekai skirta monografija". Knygotyra (in Lithuanian). 67 (67): 254. doi:10.15388/Knygotyra.2016.67.10185. ISSN 2345-0053.
- Lukšas, Aras (6 May 2011). "Balsas, šaukiantis tiesos" (in Lithuanian). Lietuvos žinios. Archived from the original on 11 August 2018.
- Martišiūtė-Linartienė, Aušra, ed. (2011). Elektroninė literatūros chrestomatija 11 klasei (PDF) (in Lithuanian). Lietuvių literatūros ir tautosakos institutas. ISBN 978-609-425-055-2.
- Merkelis, Aleksandras (1989) [1934]. Juozas Tumas Vaižgantas (in Lithuanian) (3rd ed.). Vilnius: Vaga. ISBN 5-415-00658-3.
- Minkevičienė, Aldona (7 September 2013). "Rašytojo Juozo Tumo-Vaižganto sodyba, atkeliavusi į Rokiškio kraštą" (in Lithuanian). Gimtasis Rokiškis.
- Minkevičienė, Aldona (22 November 2016). "Aktorius "nuo Dievo" Ferdinandas Jakšys: "Ko tu nori Vaižganto, tu visai į jį nepanašus. Tau tik Strazdelį vaidinti"" (in Lithuanian). Gimtasis Rokiškis.
- Panevėžio rajono savivaldybės viešoji biblioteka. "Juozo Tumo – Vaižganto ir Knygnešių muziejus" (in Lithuanian). Archived from the original on 11 August 2018.
- Pasaulio anykštėnų bendrija (20 February 2018). "Juozas Tumas". Anykštėnų biografijų žinynas (in Lithuanian).
- Pukienė, Vida (2013). Prelatas Konstantinas Olšauskas: visuomenės veikėjo tragedija (PDF) (in Lithuanian). Edukologija. ISBN 978-9955-20-884-6. Archived from the original (PDF) on 2018-08-11.
- Rinkšelis, Žilvinas. ""Saulės" gimnazija Kaune (Išlikęs, k.k.v.r. 10710)". Architektūros ir urbanistikos tyrimų centras (in Lithuanian). KTU Architektūros ir statybos institutas.
- Sužiedėlis, Saulius (2011). Historical Dictionary of Lithuania. Historical dictionaries of Europe. Vol. 80. Scarecrow Press. ISBN 978-0-8108-4914-3.
- Vaižgantas (1994). Rakauskas, Vytautas (ed.). Raštai (in Lithuanian). Vol. 5. Pradai. ISBN 9986-405-25-4.
- Vasiliauskiene, Virginija; Slocum, Jonathan (2005). "Baltic Online, Lesson 5: Lithuanian". Early Indo-European Online. Linguistics Research Center, University of Texas at Austin. Archived from the original on 4 March 2016.
- Venislovaitė, Aurina (6–19 November 2014). "Vaižgantas – kauniškis" (PDF). Nemunas (in Lithuanian). 37–38 (931–932). ISSN 0134-3149.
- Voruta (8 November 2016). "2019-ieji paskelbti Juozo Tumo-Vaižganto metais". Voruta (in Lithuanian).
