= Tauta =

1919–1920 weekly newspaper published in Kaunas, Lithuania

Tauta (literally: nation) was a Lithuanian-language newspaper published by the Party of National Progress in Kaunas, Lithuania from 19 November 1919 to 5 November 1920. It was a four-page (occasionally two-page) newspaper published once or twice a week. In total, 65 issues appeared.

It was organized and established by Vytautas Petrulis who was also the editor of the first nine issues published in 1919. In 1920, the editorial work was taken over by a commission, which included Liudas Noreika. From March 1920, or the 12th issue, it was edited by priest Juozas Tumas-Vaižgantas who was invited by Antanas Smetona to move from Vilnius to Kaunas. Tumas and Smetona had previously worked on Viltis (Hope), which formed the early outlines of the ideology of the Party of National Progress and later the Lithuanian Nationalist Union.

Tauta published articles on political, cultural, economic, social, and similar topics. Its contributors included Jonas Pranas Aleksa, Sofija Kymantaitė-Čiurlionienė, Jonas Jablonskis, Martynas Yčas, Petras Klimas, Vincas Krėvė-Mickevičius, Pranas Mašiotas, Stasys Šilingas, Juozas Tūbelis, Augustinas Voldemaras.

In April 1921, Tauta was replaced by Lietuvos balsas (Voice of Lithuania), edited by Antanas Smetona. As he was particularly critical of the government, the publications were closed one after another by the government censors. Using a loophole in the law, they would establish a new publication under a slightly different name. Thus Lietuvos balsas turned into Lietuvių balsas (Voice of the Lithuanians; November–December 1921) which became Tautos balsas (Voice of the Nation), Tėvynės balsas (Voice of the Fatherland), and eventually Krašto balsas (Voice of the Country; October 1922 – June 1923). In September 1923, they briefly revived the pre-war Vairas (Helm).
