= Pranas Mašiotas =

Lithuanian activist

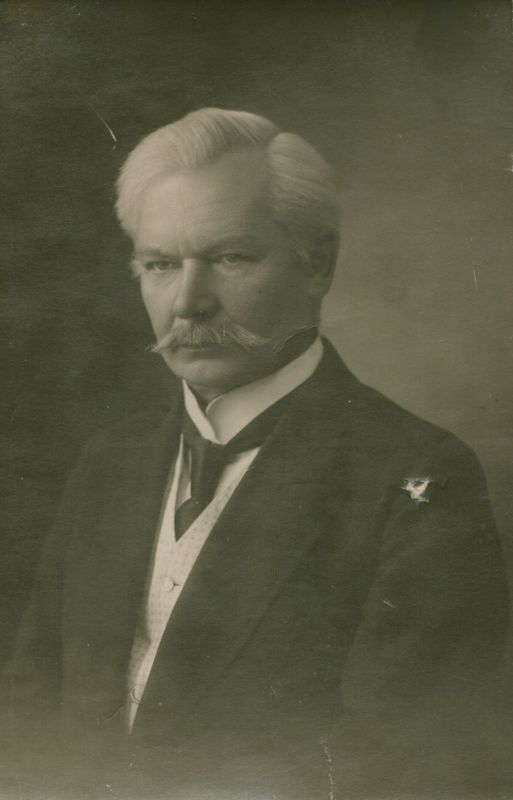
- Mašiotas in 1923
- Born: 19 December 1863; Pūstelninkai, Suwałki Governorate, Russian Empire
- Died: 14 September 1940 (aged 76); Kačerginė, Lithuanian SSR
- Burial place: Petrašiūnai Cemetery (reburied)
- Education: Marijampolė Gymnasium; Imperial Moscow University
- Occupations: Children's writer, educator
- Employer(s): Riga Gymnasium; Ministry of Education
- Spouse: Marija Jasienskytė-Mašiotienė
- Children: Marija Mašiotaitė-Urbšienė; Jonas Mašiotas; Donatas Mašiotas
- Relatives: Sister-in-law Ona Mašiotienė; Son-in-law Juozas Urbšys; Brother Jonas Mašiotas
- Awards: Order of the Lithuanian Grand Duke Gediminas (1928 and 1933)

Pranas Mašiotas (1863–1940) was a Lithuanian activist and educator best known as children's writer and translator.

Born in Suvalkija to a family of Lithuanian farmers, Mašiotas attended Marijampolė Gymnasium and studied mathematics at the Imperial Moscow University. As a Catholic, he could not obtain employment in Lithuania and took temporary clerical jobs in Łomża and Riga before becoming math teacher at the Riga Gymnasium in 1891. He held this job until World War I forced him to evacuate to Voronezh where he became director of the Lithuanian girls' and boys' gymnasiums. He returned to Lithuania in 1918 and started working on organizing the education system in the newly independent country. He was vice-minister at the Ministry of Education from 1919 to 1923. He then became director of the Vytautas the Great Gymnasium in Klaipėda. He retired in 1929 and focused on literary work. He died on 14 September 1940.

Mašiotas was very active in Lithuanian cultural life. He joined and organized various Lithuanian societies, including the Lithuanian Scientific Society and the Žvaigždė Society which he chaired for about a decade. He contributed about 600 articles to the Lithuanian press. In total, he published about 140 books of which about 30 are original (others are translations or based on works by others). He mainly published children's fiction, textbooks for schools, and popular science books. He translated such children's classics as Maya the Bee by Waldemar Bonsels and Emil and the Detectives by Erich Kästner.

== Biography ==
=== Early life ===
Mašiotas was born on 19 December 1863 in Pūstelninkai near Kudirkos Naumiestis which was then part of the Russian Empire. His parents were farmers. Their home was located near the border with East Prussia and as such sometimes sheltered Lithuanian book smugglers who carried illegal Lithuanian publications to the Russian Empire in violation of the Lithuanian press ban.

He attended a Russian primary school for about half a year, but was mostly home schooled by his parents and relatives. In 1874, he was admitted to the preparatory class of the Marijampolė Gymnasium. His classmates were future writers Antanas Krikščiukaitis (pen name Aišbė) and Antanas Vilkutaitis (pen name Keturakis). He graduated in 1883 with a silver medal.

He received a special government stipend for Lithuanian students (360 rubles annually) and enrolled into the Faculty of Physics and Mathematics at the Imperial Moscow University. There, he joined Lithuanian cultural life and became a contributor to Aušra, the first Lithuanian-language newspaper. In total, he published ten articles in Aušra in which he criticized the Lithuanian press ban and other Russification policies implement by the Tsarist regime and provided practical advice to Lithuanian farmers.

=== Teacher in Riga ===
He returned to Lithuania in 1887, but as a Lithuanian Catholic could not obtain a job due to the Russification policies. He got a clerical job in Łomża in Poland and in 1889 moved to Riga in Latvia. Initially, he was a clerk at the office of the Riga Educational District. In 1891, he became math teacher at the Riga Gymnasium and held this job for almost 25 years until World War I. In 1913–1915, he was also the director of a private girls' gymnasium in Riga.

In Riga, Mašiotas was active in Lithuanian cultural life. Riga's industrialization provided employment opportunities that attracted increasing numbers of Lithuanians. In 1913, there were more than 35,000 Lithuanians in Riga. Together with others, he participated in and organized various Lithuanian societies, including the Lithuanian Benefit Society (Lietuvių pašalpos draugija) which organized cultural events to provide assistance to struggling Lithuanians in Riga, Kanklės Society which organized amateur theater performances (established in 1904), and Žvaigždė Society (established in 1906) which established six Lithuanian primary schools and organized evening courses for adults. Mašiotas chaired the Žvaigždė Society for about a decade. He frequently collaborated with Marcelinas Šikšnys, another Lithuanian math teacher at the Riga Gymnasium.

Mašiotas also participated in cultural and political life in Lithuania. In 1902, he participated in the founding meeting of the Lithuanian Democratic Party and was elected to its central committee. During the Russian Revolution of 1905, he attended the Great Seimas of Vilnius. In 1905, Mašiotas became a member of the 20-member committee tasked with organizing the Lithuanian Scientific Society which was officially established in April 1907. He contributed his ethnographic photographs to the society. Some of his photos were added to the Lithuanian exhibition at the International Paris Exposition in 1900.

Mašiotas contributed some 70 articles to illegal Lithuanian periodicals (pre-1904) and about 200 articles to the legalized press, including Šviesa, Vienybė lietuvininkų, Vilniaus žinios, Viltis, Vairas, Rygos garsas. His articles most often discussed education, Lithuanian language, economy, social issues. Due to his efforts, Lietuvių laikraštis which was published in Saint Petersburg in 1904–1906 established a section for children in which Mašiotas published his works and translations. He particularly supported Varpas and participated in the meetings of its publishers and supporters.

=== World War I ===
At the outbreak of World War I, Mašiotas together with Juozas Tumas-Vaižgantas became representatives of the Lithuanian Society for the Relief of War Sufferers in Riga. In summer 1915, as German Army approached Riga, Mašiotas evacuated to Moscow and then Voronezh where he became director of the Lithuanian girls' and boys' gymnasiums established by Martynas Yčas. At the same time, Mašiotas worked on writing math textbooks. Since there was no established or consistent Lithuanian mathematical terminology, three mathematicians (Mašiotas, Marcelinas Šikšnys, Zigmas Žemaitis) and linguist Jonas Jablonskis worked on standardizing the terminology and compiling a Lithuanian math dictionary.

Mašiotas also participated in Lithuanian political life in Russia. After the failure of the Petrograd Seimas, the Union of Lithuanian Soldiers asked three men – Mašiotas, Jablonskis, and Kazys Grinius – to organize the Supreme Lithuanian Council in Russia, a political committee that could represent the Lithuanian nation. Mašiotas became vice-chairman of the Supreme Lithuanian Council.

=== Independent Lithuania ===
He returned to Lithuania in 1918 and started working organizing the Lithuanian education system. He joined the education section of the Council of Lithuania and later worked at the Ministry of Education as director of the Higher Education Department and as vice-minister. At the same time, he published numerous articles discussing plans for organizing various schools in Lithuania. Due to political disagreements, the post of vice-minister was abolished in 1923 and Mašiotas was given the job as the director of the Vytautas the Great Gymnasium in Klaipėda. Klaipėda Region was incorporated as an autonomous region of Lithuania after the Klaipėda Revolt in January 1923.

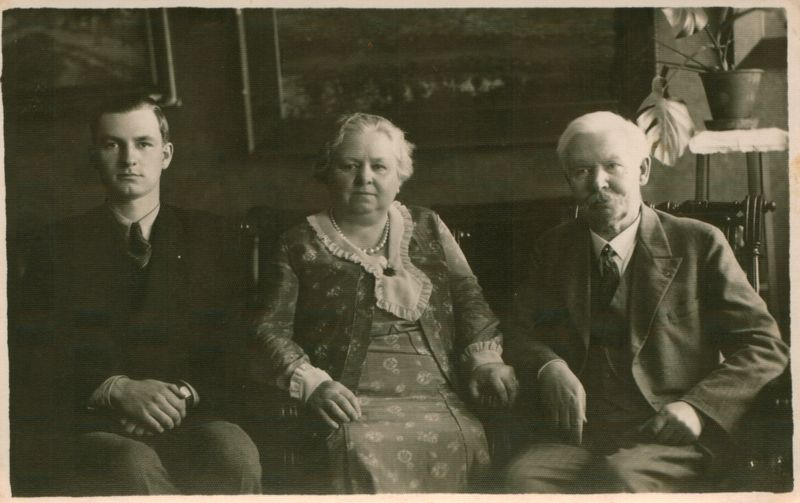
Mašiotas with his wife Marija and son Donatas around 1930

Mašiotas retired in 1929 and devoted his time to writing. There are two versions of his retirement – due to disagreements with Klaipėda governor Antanas Merkys or for health reasons (cheek neuralgia that would get so bad that he could not speak). His wife Marija typed up his handwritten works while his son Donatas helped to arrange their publication. His articles were published in Iliustruota Lietuva, Lietuva, Lietuvos aidas, Lietuvos ūkininkas, Lietuvos žinios, Mūsų senovė, Naujoji Romuva, Trimitas, etc.

Mašiotas was awarded the Order of the Lithuanian Grand Duke Gediminas in 1928 (2nd class) and 1933 (1st class). He received honorary doctorate from the University of Lithuania in 1923 and was elected as honorary member of the Society of Lithuanian Writers. One of the streets in Kaunas was named after him in 1934.

=== Death ===
Architect Vytautas Žemkalnis-Landsbergis, one of Mašiotas' students in Riga who Mašiotas encouraged to study architecture, designed his private residence in the Žaliakalnis district of Kaunas where Mašiotas lived from 1929. After the Soviet occupation of Lithuania in June 1940, Mašiotas house in Kaunas was confiscated by the NKVD. He moved in with his son in Kačerginė. His daughter bibliographer Marija Mašiotaitė-Urbšienė and her husband Juozas Urbšys were arrested and deported to Siberia by the Soviets.

On 14 September 1940, he died at the age of 77. His wake was held at the Vytautas the Great War Museum; his funeral was a large public event attended by numerous government officials and writers. Speeches were given by Antanas Venclova and Petras Cvirka, among others. He was buried at the Kaunas City Cemetery. When the cemetery was converted to Ramybė Park in 1959, he was reburied at the Petrašiūnai Cemetery.

== Works ==
Mašiotas wrote and published numerous books for children, textbooks for schools, and popular science books. In total, he published about 140 books of which about 30 are original. He also contributed some 600 articles to various Lithuanian periodicals. Because the Lithuania press was illegal before 1904, he used some 50 different pen names and initialisms.

=== Children's literature ===
Mašiotas is best known as a children's author. He is sometimes referred to as the "father of the Lithuanian children's literature". Prior publications for children were religious or clearly didactic texts. In 1894, Mašiotas published an article in Varpas in which he outlined the basic requirements for children's texts – works should have aesthetic, educational, and moral value as well as be written in correct language. These principles were largely adopted by future authors. His later works and translations focused on educational value (e.g. teaching children about natural phenomena) as opposed to rousing child's creativity or imagination.

His tales were published in several collections – My Little Gift (Mano dovanėlė, 1st edition in 1913, 5th edition in 1970) and Old Man's Tales (Senio pasakos, 1st edition in 1917, 4th edition in 1970) are most popular. While the tales promote moral values, they are written without direct moralization. Several of his books – I Too Was Little (Ir aš mažas buvau, 1st edition in 1919, 6th edition in 1969), Remembering Gymnasium (Gimnaziją atsiminus, 1st edition in 1922), When Books Were Banned (Kai knygas draudė, first edition in 1924, 4th edition in 1993) – are autobiographical stories about the Lithuanian National Revival and the Lithuanian press ban. In 1938, I Too Was Little was awarded the literary prize of the Lithuanian Red Cross. His short stories feature realistic characters and are most often based on rational thought and not emotion. His travel books idealize Lithuania's nature but also include geographical, historical, ethnographic information. They were aimed at school students in hopes of spurring their interest in their native country and encouraging them to launch their own local studies.

Mašiotas translated various authors, including Daniel Defoe, James Oliver Curwood, Erich Kästner, Hugh Lofting, Karin Michaëlis, Ferenc Molnár, Ernest Thompson Seton, H. G. Wells, Ernst Wichert, and many others. Mašiotas started translating when he taught Lithuanian language on weekends in Riga. As homework, he would assign students to translate Russian or German works and then became interested in this work himself. He translated freely, modifying or shortening texts as he saw fit to adapt them to the Lithuanian audience.

=== Textbooks and popular science ===
Encouraged by Jonas Jablonskis, Mašiotas wrote his first math textbook in summer 1905. It was a problem book in arithmetic that was published in two parts in 1906. It became very popular and was republished 14 times (last edition in 1938). In 1919–1921, he published other textbooks on plane trigonometry, history of math, algebra, logarithm. He also wrote a textbook on physics (1922) and two textbooks on learning to write (1907 and 1921). The textbook on plane trigonometry was reworked and republished by his son Jonas Mašiotas in 1938. The textbooks were prepared in a hurry to fill the urgent need of Lithuanian-language textbooks. Therefore, their quality suffered.

Mašiotas also published several popular science books for children, including Conversations about Sky and Earth (Pasikalbėjimai apie dangų ir žemę in 1901), How People Took Over the World (Kaip žmogus žemėje įsigalėjo in 1919). His Science Tales (Mokslo pasakos) were first published in 1916 and republished three more times. It includes eight stories how a teacher instructs shepherds about laws of physics using everyday language and small experiments – i.e. lively dialogues and some semblance of a plot turned textbook lectures into lively easy to understand stories.

== Legacy ==
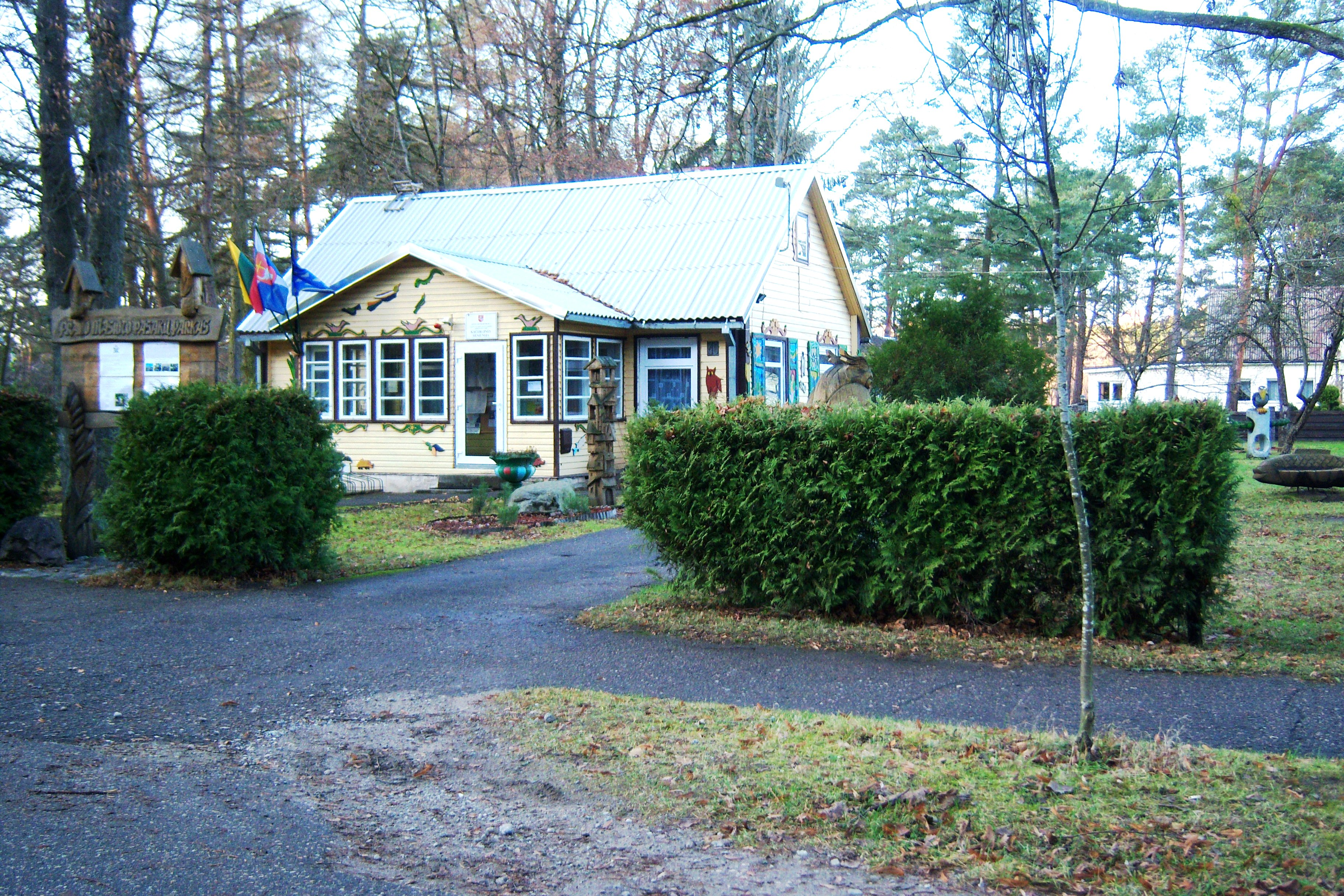
Fairy Tale Park dedicated to Mašiotas in Kačerginė

Starting in 1969, Mašiotas' works and translations are republished in the series Little Library of Pranas Mašiotas (Prano Mašioto knygynėlis). On average, in 1969–1979, about 25,000 copies of each book was published. By 1983, the series had 37 books. It grew to 50 books by 2009.

His daughter Marija published her memoirs about Mašiotas in 1982 (second edition in 1996). Albinas Degutis compiled and published Mašiotas' bibliography (1990) and a collection of his articles, letters, and memoirs about him (2013). In 2013, on the occasion of his 150th birth anniversary, Lietuvos paštas issued a commemorative postal stamp in his memory.

Three schools – in Kaunas, Vilnius, and Klaipėda – and several streets in Lithuania are named in his honor. A memorial stone was erected at the birthplace of Mašiotas in 1990. In 2001, Mašiotas' granddaughter gifted the house in Kačerginė to the town on a condition that it would house a museum dedicated to the Mašiotas family. In 2004, several wood carvers created sculptures for the Fairy Tale Park inspired by Mašiotas that was established around the house.

In 1983, the 120th birth anniversary of Mašiotas, Vilnius University organized an academic seminar on children's literature in Lithuania. Several similar seminars took place irregularly until an annual seminar named after Mašiotas was established in 1993. It is held in December by the Lithuanian section of the International Board on Books for Young People (IBBY) and the Martynas Mažvydas National Library of Lithuania. In 2012, IBBY renamed its annual (since 1993) award for the best Lithuanian book for children and adolescents in honor of Mašiotas.
