= Rygos garsas =

Lithuanian-language newspaper published in Riga, Latvia

Rygos garsas (literally: sound of Riga) was a Lithuanian-language newspaper published in Riga (present-day Latvia, then Russian Empire) from March 1909 to August 1917. While format and publication frequency varied, most of the time Rygos garsas was a four-page newspaper published twice a week. In total, 716 issues were published. The newspaper published news from abroad and Lithuania as well as articles on issues of Lithuanian education, religion, culture in Latvia. It supported the Catholic values.

In the early 20th century, Riga became a center of Lithuanian emigration. The Lithuanian community desired to have its own newspaper and the activists established a publishing company with 32 shareholders. The first issue was published on 19 March 1909. Its first editor and publisher was Jurgis Linartas, a notary. It was published once a week in 1909 and twice a week in January–September 1910. Its circulation was 1500 copies in 1910. Due to financial difficulties, Linartas resigned in May 1910 leaving the newspaper to Antanas Šimoliūnas. The editors changed frequently and included Domas Šidlauskas-Visuomis and Juozas Tūbelis. In 1911, the publication was taken over by the Society of Saint Casimir in Kaunas though the official editor and publisher was J. Bajoras. The society invited priest Juozapas Bikinas to become the editor. The newspaper was published twice a week from December 1912 to December 1914.

Due to the outbreak of World War I, there was a pent up demand for news and Bikinas wanted to increase the publication frequency to three times a week. He convinced his old acquaintance priest Juozas Tumas-Vaižgantas to move from Laižuva to Riga and help him edit Rygos garsas. Bikinas and Tumas bought out the newspaper from Bajoras for 600 rubles and increased the publication frequency to three times a week from January to July 1915. Tumas was promised a salary of 30 rubles a month for his editorial work, but due to financial difficulties did not receive it. Bikinas edited news and political articles, while Tumas edited articles on cultural and societal matters. The circulation peaked at 13,000 copies. With the German attack in the Second Battle of the Masurian Lakes in February 1915, Lithuanian war refugees began arriving to Riga and the newspaper organized a committee for the refugee relief. Tumas left Riga later in 1915 while Bikinas continued to edit the newspaper until 1917. The newspaper was discontinued when Riga was captured by the German Empire in early September 1917.
