= Mūsų senovė =

Lithuanian-language academic magazine

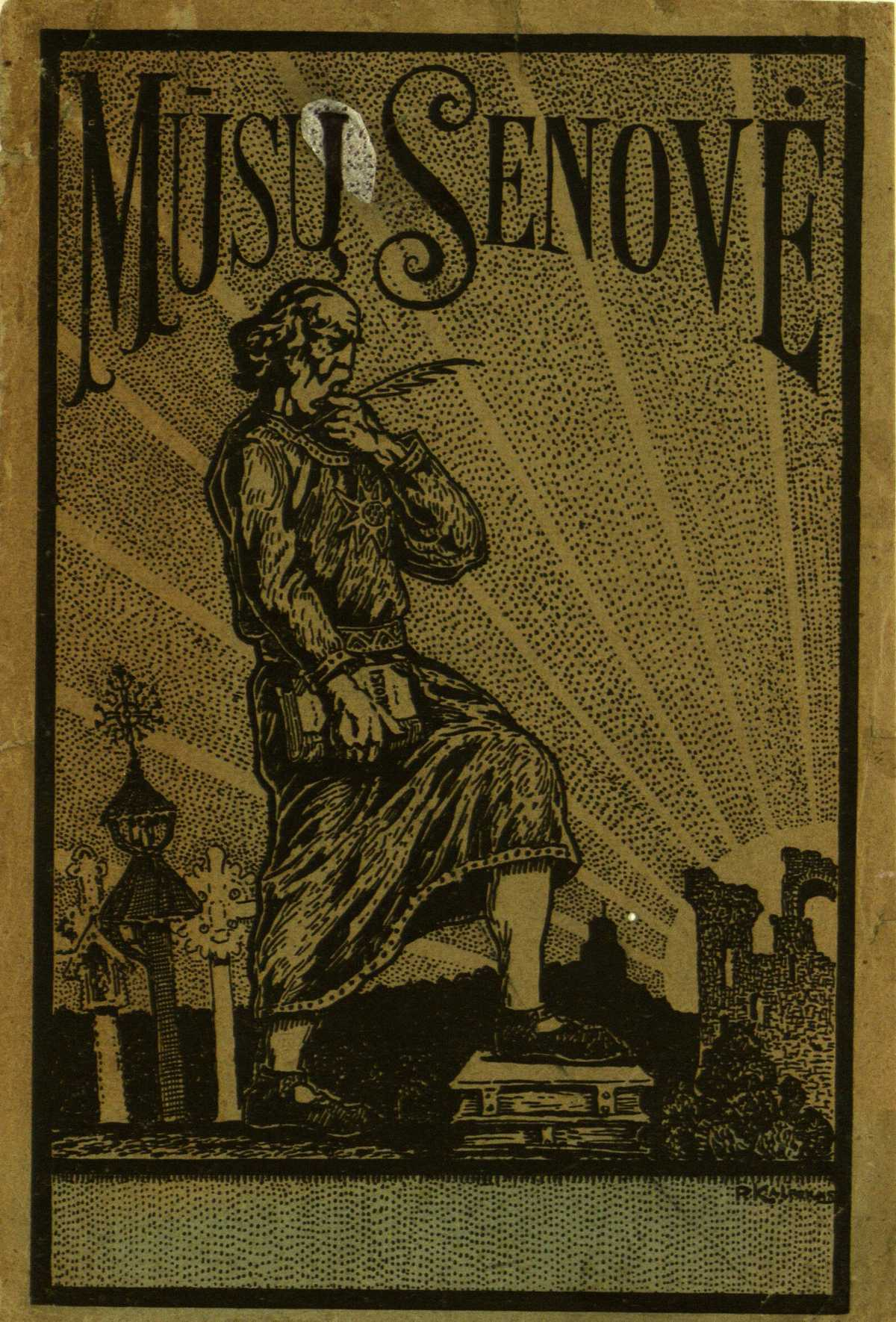
Cover page of the first issue (art by Petras Kalpokas)

Mūsų senovė (literally: our past) was a Lithuanian-language academic magazine published in Kaunas, Lithuania in 1921–1922 (edited by Juozas Tumas-Vaižgantas, published by the Ministry of Education) and in 1937–1940 (edited by Mykolas Biržiška, published by Vytautas Magnus University). It was the first attempt to publish a periodical dedicated to the study of the history in Lithuanian. It was published irregularly and mostly dealt with the materials and topics related to the Lithuanian National Revival and the Lithuanian press ban. In total, 10 issues appeared.

== First magazine ==
On 16 January 1921, a gathering of a group of older Lithuanian intellectuals and activists – prof. Vincas Čepinskis, prof. Adomas Jakštas-Dambrauskas, Dr. Kazys Grinius, prof. Jonas Jablonskis, prof. Antanas Kriščiukaitis, prof. Petras Leonas, prelate prof. Jonas Mačiulis-Maironis, teacher Pranas Mašiotas, prof. Povilas Matulionis, priest Juozas Tumas-Vaižgantas, and prof. Eduards Volters – discussed the need for a publication where they could share their memoirs and publish other material related to the Lithuanian National Revival and the Lithuanian press ban. The second meeting on 20 January was attended by more intellectuals, including Kazimieras Būga, Sofija Čiurlionienė, Petras Klimas. They decided to publish magazine Mūsų senovė irregularly – as material and funding became available. Tumas-Vaižgantas was selected as its chief editor with Būga, Klimas and Augustinas Janulaitis elected to the editorial board.

With the help from Vincas Krėvė-Mickevičius, Mūsų senovė was financed and published by the Ministry of Education. Contributors included Paulius Galaunė, Liudas Gira, Jurgis Šaulys. Five volumes (a total of 865 pages) were published before it was discontinued due to financial difficulties and low quality of published material. It published articles on various topics (including a few on subjects such as archaeology or numismatics) and primary material for future studies (such as correspondence, memoirs, diaries, documents). They mostly concerned the history of Lithuania from the January Uprising of 1864 to World War I. The magazine also published reviews of books. One such review by Augustinas Voldemaras of books by priest Antanas Alekna resulted in a polemic discussion that highlighted differences between more liberal intelligentsia and more conservative Christian clergy. Editor Tumas-Vaižgantas was not an academic and the publication was rather chaotic without a well-defined structure.

== Second magazine ==
The discontinued Mūsų senovė was replaced by other historical magazines and journals, however they often published articles on archaeology and the Grand Duchy of Lithuania with little attention given to the more recent history of Lithuania. Tumas-Vaižgantas established a rich archive at the Vytautas Magnus University related to the Lithuanian National Revival and the Lithuanian press ban. To encourage the study of this material and this historical period, the university agreed to revive Mūsų senovė in 1937. Edited by Vaclovas Biržiška, it had a well-defined structure that was similar to academic journals. The publication was discontinued after the Soviet occupation of Lithuania in June 1940.

The journal dedicated most of its content to the publication of memoirs, documents, correspondence, and other primary materials. Most of the material was published in over two or more volumes. For example, memoirs of priest Anupras Jasevičius, who was exiled to Siberia for supporting the January Uprising, were published in sections in all five volumes. The published articles included a study of the satires published by members of the Szubrawcy Society by Vincas Maciūnas, of the Lithuanian theater in Vilnius by Julius Būtėnas, of the Lithuanian exposition at the World's Fair in Paris in 1900 by Juozas Bagdonas, of ideological similarities and differences between Józef Piłsudski and Andrius Domaševičius by Augustinas Janulaitis.
