= Viltis (newspaper) =

Lithuanian-language newspaper

Viltis (literally: hope) was a Lithuanian-language newspaper published in Vilnius in 1907–1915 and 1991–1994. The newspapers was established in October 1907 by Antanas Smetona and Juozas Tumas-Vaižgantas. It promoted unity among Lithuanians, attempting to bring together conservative Catholic clergy and more liberal intelligentsia. The newspaper concentrated on cultural matters as opposed to politics or news reports. It was supported by the clergy, but it was not a religious newspaper. Eventually, the clergy grew dissatisfied with the secular and moderate tone and Smetona left in 1913 to establish a separate newspaper Vairas. The intellectuals around Viltis became known as viltininkai and formed an early embryo of the Lithuanian Nationalist Union, the ruling party in Lithuania in 1926–1940. Viltis was discontinued due to World War I. It was briefly resurrected in the early 1990s by the Lithuanian Nationalist Union.

== Viltis in 1907–1915 ==
=== History ===
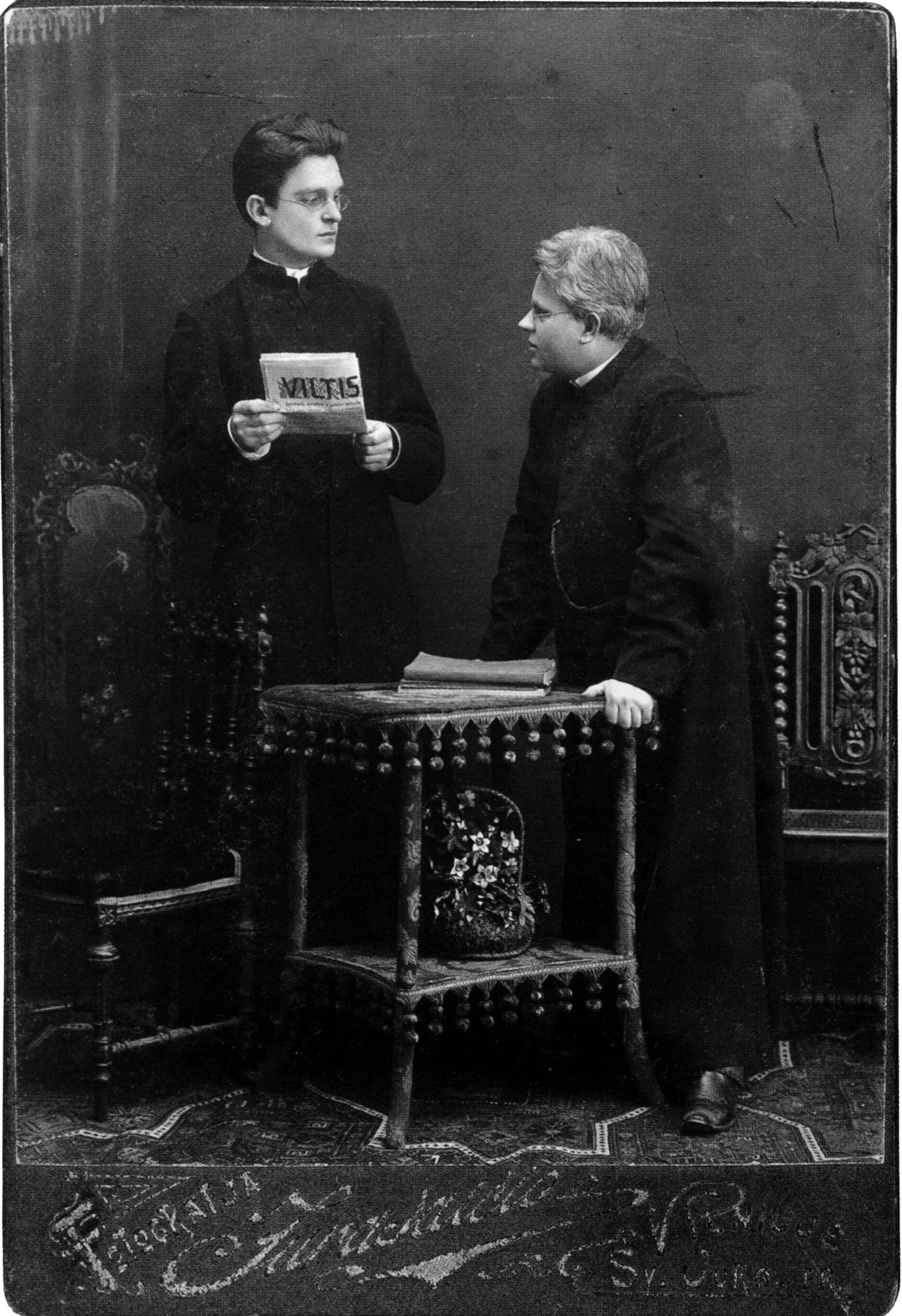
Juozas Tumas-Vaižgantas (right) transfers Viltis to its new editor Fabijonas Kemėšis (left)

The newspaper was established in October 1907 and published three times a week. It filled the void of Lithuanian-language newspapers in Vilnius as Vilniaus žinios was discontinued due to financial difficulties in March 1907. Antanas Smetona, an intellectual who previously edited Vilniaus žinios, and Juozas Tumas-Vaižgantas, a priest who previously edited Tėvynės sargas, formed a partnership in hopes of uniting Lithuanians. They hoped to bring together the conservative clergy and the more liberal intelligentsia (known as pirmeiviai) to combat Polonization, particularly in the mixed Vilnius Region. Smetona was the responsible editor setting newspaper's ideology, while Tumas-Vaižgantas handled the business and the finances. They established a trust company, supported initially by 179 subscribers – mostly members of the clergy – who contributed 100 rubles each, to finance the operations. It was the first Lithuanian newspaper set up this way. In 1908, Viltis had a circulation of 4,000 copies.

In November 1910, Tumas-Vaižgantas published an article listing known churches where Lithuanian-language services were removed by orders of Kazimierz Mikołaj Michalkiewicz, administrator of the Diocese of Vilnius while Bishop Eduard von der Ropp was in exile. This caused much controversy and Bishop Gaspar Felicjan Cyrtowt assigned Tumas-Vaižgantas to Laižuva in northern Lithuania. Effectively, it was an exile and also meant his departure from Viltis. His place was taken by other priests, Fabijonas Kemėšis and later Juozas Dabužis. Various Lithuanian groups sent letters protesting the removal of Tumas-Vaižgantas to Viltis for three months.

In light of other Catholic publications, such as Šaltinis and Vienybė, Viltis seemed too secular and the clergy grew dissatisfied. The pressure only increased when Viltis announced its plans to become a daily. During the September 1913 shareholders' meeting, the clergy insisted that Pranas Dovydaitis, member of the Catholic Ateitis federation, would become Smetona's deputy. Unexpectedly, Smetona interpreted it as a vote of no confidence in him and resigned. Dovydaitis took over the newspaper, which switched to daily publication on 1 January 1914 at an annual cost of 25,000 rubles. Smetona, with financial support from Martynas Yčas, went on to establish another newspaper, Vairas, where he continued to advocate the middle road between the clergy and the intelligentsia. The episode illustrated continued splintering of Lithuanian cultural movement.

=== Content ===
Initially, Viltis was published three times a week. Its primary goal and hope was national unity among Lithuanians. The newspaper promoted Lithuanian national identity above political differences and considered itself a non-party newspaper. Viltis liked to emphasize that it was the middle road, though its political views were right-wing. Despite attempts at reconciliation, Viltis received criticism from both sides. The clergy criticized the newspaper for not sufficiently promoting Catholic ideas. For example, they attacked articles that positively evaluated Vydūnas' thoughts on the theory of evolution, theosophy, and pantheism. Intelligentsia, on the other hand, thought that the newspaper was too religious. For example, Kazys Grinius wrote that Viltis and nationalistic consideration were only a tool used by the clergy to defend their privileged status in the society.

Viltis published little of news reports, but paid particular attention to the Lithuanian language and folk culture as well as issues in art, science, education, and morals. It is credited with helping to establish the standardized Lithuanian language developed by Jonas Jablonskis. Viltis understood that increasing peasants' material wealth was instrumental in achieving cultural goals and, therefore, advocated for mutual aid societies, credit unions, and trade, while opposing emigration (mostly to the United States), but provided little in terms of practical advice or guidance. It defended the Catholic Church against attacks by the socialists, but it was not a religious newspaper. Unlike the more active socialist revolutionaries, the newspaper took a moderate stand on the Tsarist regime; the Lithuanian movement was weak and it would be foolish to fight the regime. At the same time, it criticized Lithuanian involvement in Russian politics, urging them to concentrate on Lithuanian issues.

=== Contributors ===
Linguistic matters were discussed by Antanas Smetona, Jonas Jablonskis, Juozas Balčikonis, and Jurgis Šlapelis, music by Mikalojus Konstantinas Čiurlionis, theater by Gabrielius Landsbergis-Žemkalnis, general cultural topics by Jonas Basanavičius, Tadeusz Dowgird, Adomas Dambrauskas, and Augustinas Voldemaras, and literature by Juozas Tumas-Vaižgantas, Šatrijos Ragana, and Sofija Kymantaitė-Čiurlionienė. Viltis also published many works of fiction. The literary section was edited by Liudas Gira and included short stories by Lazdynų Pelėda, dramas and legends by Vincas Krėvė-Mickevičius, first short stories of Ignas Šeinius, and feuilletons by Juozas Balčikonis.

== Viltis in 1991–1994 ==
After the declaration of independence, the newspaper was reestablished by the Lithuanian Nationalist Union in 1991. Initially, it was published weekly and had circulation of 12,000 copies. It was edited by Rimantas Smetona (nephew of Antanas Smetona) and Balys Sriubas. Later, the publishing frequency was reduced to twice a month. In 1994, when circulation dropped to 2,000 copies, the newspaper was discontinued.
