= Šakyna =

- Town
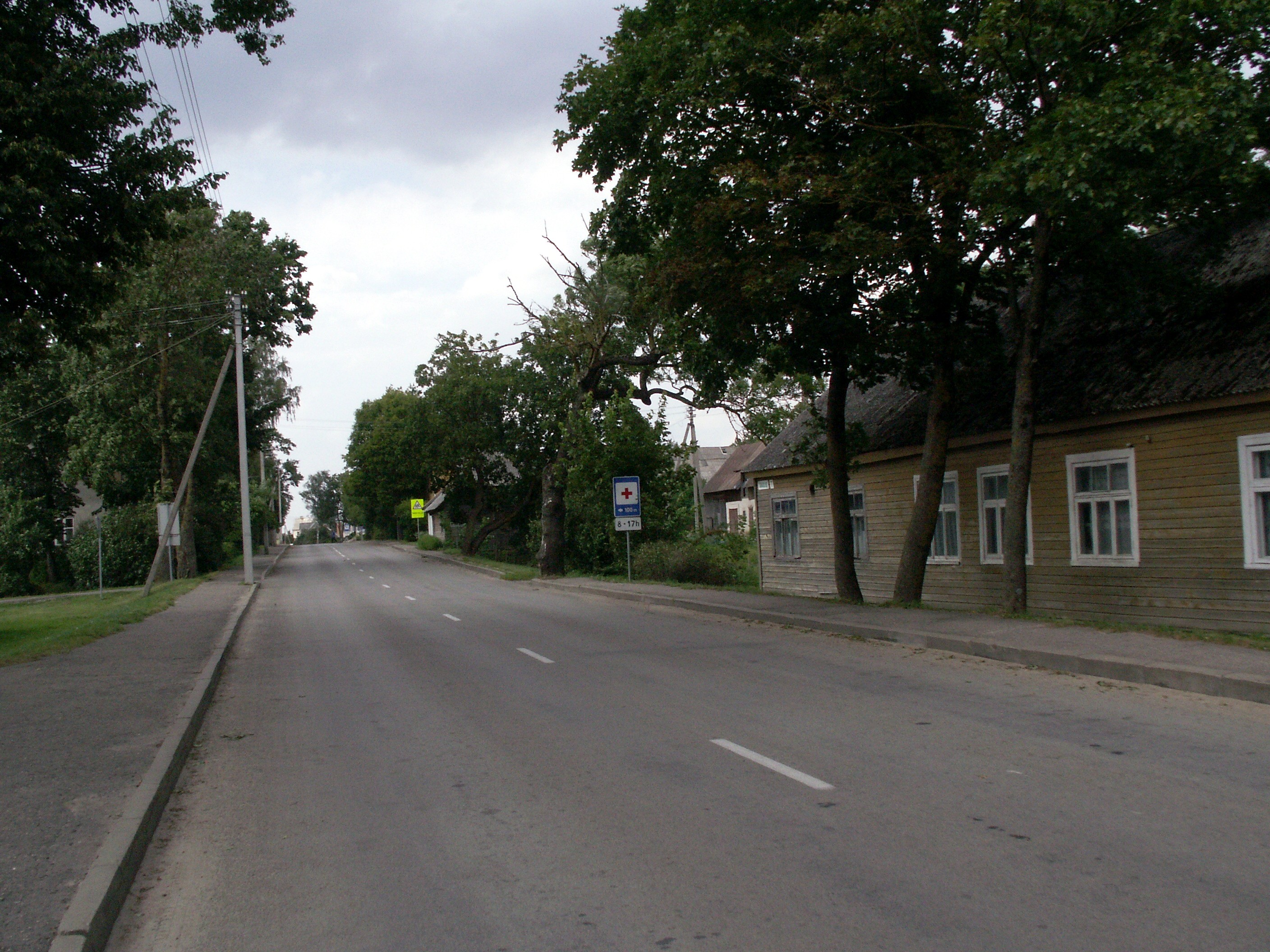

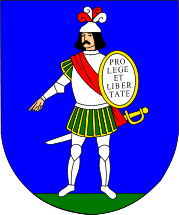
- Coat of arms

- Location in Lithuania
- Coordinates: 56°10′40″N 23°07′20″E
- Country: Lithuania
- Ethnographic region: Samogitia
- County: Šiauliai County

Population (2011)
  - Total: 382
- Time zone: UTC+2 (EET)
  - Summer (DST): UTC+3 (EEST)

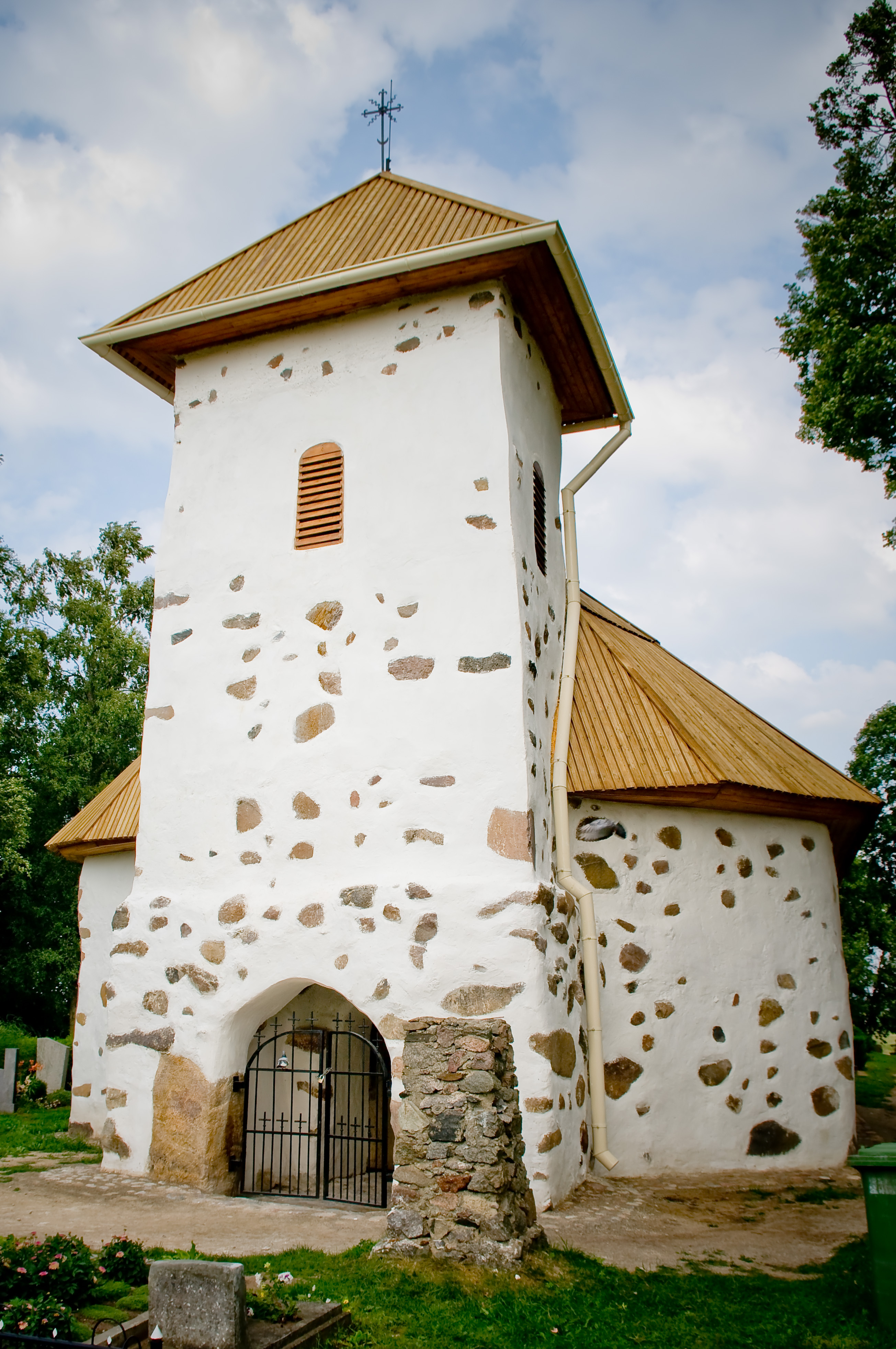
Šakyna cemetery chapel

Šakyna is a small town in Šiauliai County in northern-central Lithuania. As of 2011 it had a population of 382.
