= Our Lady of Sorrows Church, Riga =

Church in Riga, Latvia

Our Lady of Sorrows Church
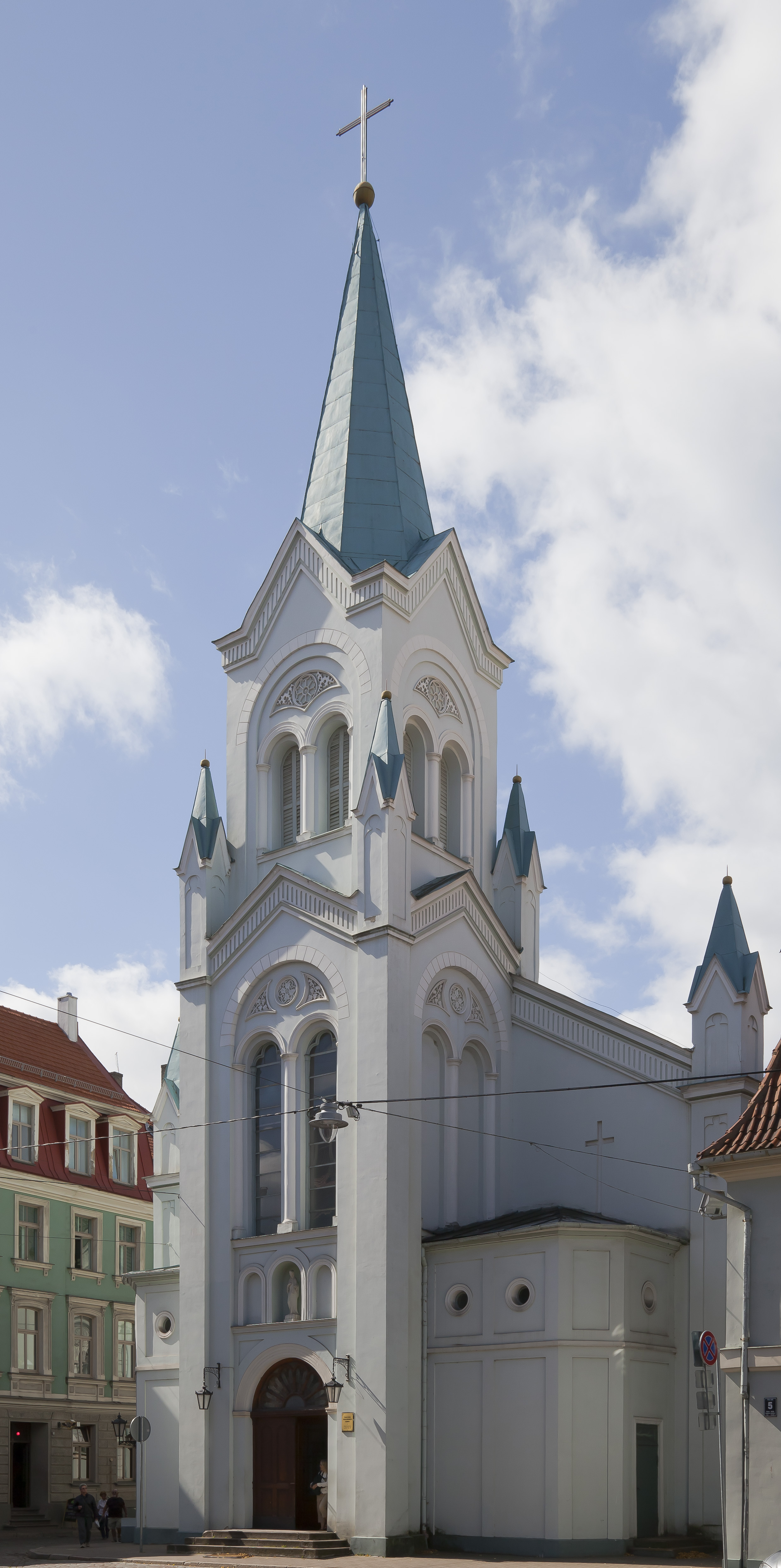

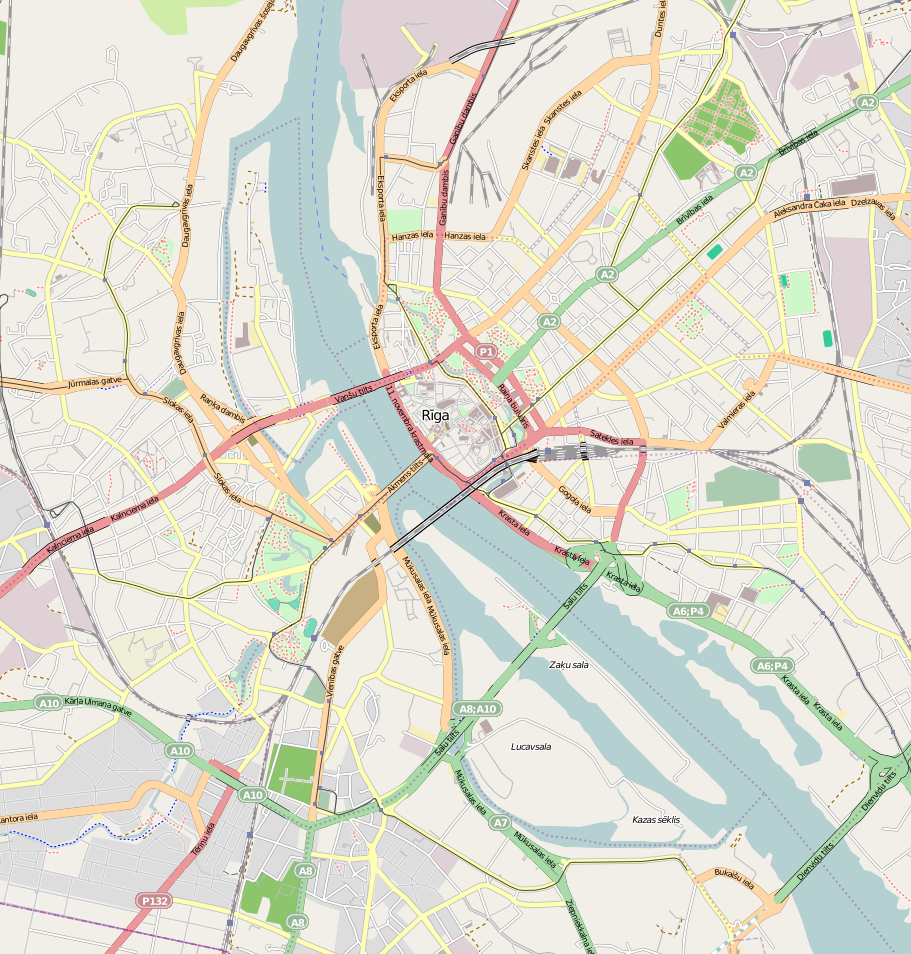
- Location within Riga
- 56°57′1.12″N 24°6′5.99″E
- Location: Riga
- Country: Latvia
- Denomination: Roman Catholic

Our Lady of Sorrows Church (Latvian: Sāpju Dievmātes Romas katoļu baznīca) is a Roman Catholic church in Riga, the capital of Latvia. The church is situated at the address 5 Pils Street. It was built in 1785.
