= Vairas =

Lithuanian-language political and cultural newspaper

Vairas (literally: steering wheel; also translated as helm or rudder) was a Lithuanian-language political and cultural newspaper published by Antanas Smetona and the Lithuanian Nationalist Union, the ruling party in Lithuania in 1926–1940. It was published three separate times. Vairas was first established in January 1914 when Smetona departed Viltis; it was discontinued due to World War I. The newspaper was briefly revived in September 1923 when Smetona and Augustinas Voldemaras harshly criticized their political opponents and the Lithuanian government. Due to the anti-government rhetoric, their newspapers were closed by state censors one after another, but they would quickly establish a new newspaper under a new title. Vairas was closed in February 1924. The newspaper was reestablished as a cultural magazine in 1929 with the backing of the authoritarian regime of Smetona. In 1939, it became a weekly political magazine that pushed an agenda of radical nationalism and openly sympathized with National Socialism. The magazine was discontinued after the Soviet occupation of Lithuania in June 1940.

== 1914–1915 ==
Vairas was established by Antanas Smetona with financial backing of Martynas Yčas on 5 January 1914 in Vilnius. After a conflict with conservative clergy, Smetona departed Viltis and established Vairas to continue its original mission of uniting Lithuanians, regardless of their religious or political beliefs, and promoting the Lithuanian national identity. Initially it was a monthly, and in 1915 became a weekly. The publication was discontinued in summer 1915 due to World War I.

It was frequently illustrated with reproductions of paintings and photos by Lithuanian artists, including Mikalojus Konstantinas Čiurlionis, Petras Kalpokas, Antanas Žmuidzinavičius, Adomas Varnas, Juozas Zikaras, Petras Rimša.

== 1923–1924 ==
Vairas was reestablished as a weekly in Kaunas in September 1923. Smetona, the first President of Lithuania in April 1919 – June 1920, and Augustinas Voldemaras, the first Prime Minister in November–December 1918, relentlessly criticized their political opponents, the Lithuanian government, and the Second Seimas. Their publications were closed one after another by the government censors. Using a loophole in the law, they would establish a new publication under a slightly different name. Thus Lietuvos balsas (Voice of Lithuania; April–October 1921) turned into Lietuvių balsas (Voice of the Lithuanians; November–December 1921) which became Tautos balsas (Voice of the Nation), Tėvynės balsas (Voice of the Fatherland), and eventually Krašto balsas (Voice of the Country; October 1922 – June 1923).

In September 1923, they revived the pre-war Vairas. It was double the size of Krašto balsas and was illustrated with works by Petras Rimša, but it also did not last long. In November 1923, both Smetona and Voldemaras were imprisoned for two months for their criticism of the government. Vairas was discontinued on February 24, 1924. It was replaced by one-time publications Skeveldrų rinkinys (Collection of Fragments; February 28) and Irklas (Oar; March 7). Renamed to Tautos vairas, the newspaper was published from March to fall 1924 when it was replaced by Lietuvis (The Lithuanian).

== 1929–1940 ==
Vairas was once again reestablished as a monthly magazine in 1929 in Kaunas. It became a biweekly in 1938 and weekly in 1939. The magazine was edited by Domas Cesevičius, Bronius Dirmeikis, Vladas Nausėdas, Izidorius Tamošaitis, Stasys Leskaitis-Ivošiškis (1938), and Kazys Dausa (1939–1940). The magazine was discontinued after the Soviet occupation of Lithuania in June 1940.

The Lithuanian Nationalist Union was the ruling party in Lithuania since the December 1926 coup and published its official daily Lietuvos aidas. Therefore, Vairas returned to its roots and published articles on issues of culture, philosophy, science, literature, etc. as well as on questions of social, political, and economic life. It also published works of fiction and their reviews. Its contributors included Juozas Balčikonis, Jonas Balys, Liudas Gira, Valentinas Gustainis, Pranas Mašiotas, Balys Sruoga, Petras Vaičiūnas, Augustinas Voldemaras.

Vairas became more radical in 1938–1939, and switched from a cultural monthly to a political monthly. A group of members of Young Lithuania, the youth organization of the Lithuanian Nationalist Union, took editorial control of Vairas and became known as vairininkai. The group pushed an agenda of radical nationalism. They were openly anti-semitic, anti-democratic, anti-communist, totalitarian and sympathized with National Socialism. They believed all political parties to be a hurdle towards creating a monolithic state with an unquestioned absolute leader at the top (cf. Führerprinzip) and saw democracy as a "psychosis" which the young generation should rid itself of. For example, the magazine published articles proposing economic policies to "review" property of foreigners and impose special taxes or fines to employers who hired non-Lithuanians with a clear goal of diminishing the economic power of Lithuanian Jews. Vytautas Alantas published an article in Vairas arguing in favor of an ethnic cleansing in the Vilnius Region after it was returned to Lithuania according to the terms of the Soviet–Lithuanian Mutual Assistance Treaty – he cited Nazi Germany as an example writing that "the Germans turned the city of Gdynia into the most German city in their country through a fully mechanical process – people were moved out and other people were moved in".
