= Laižuva =

- Town
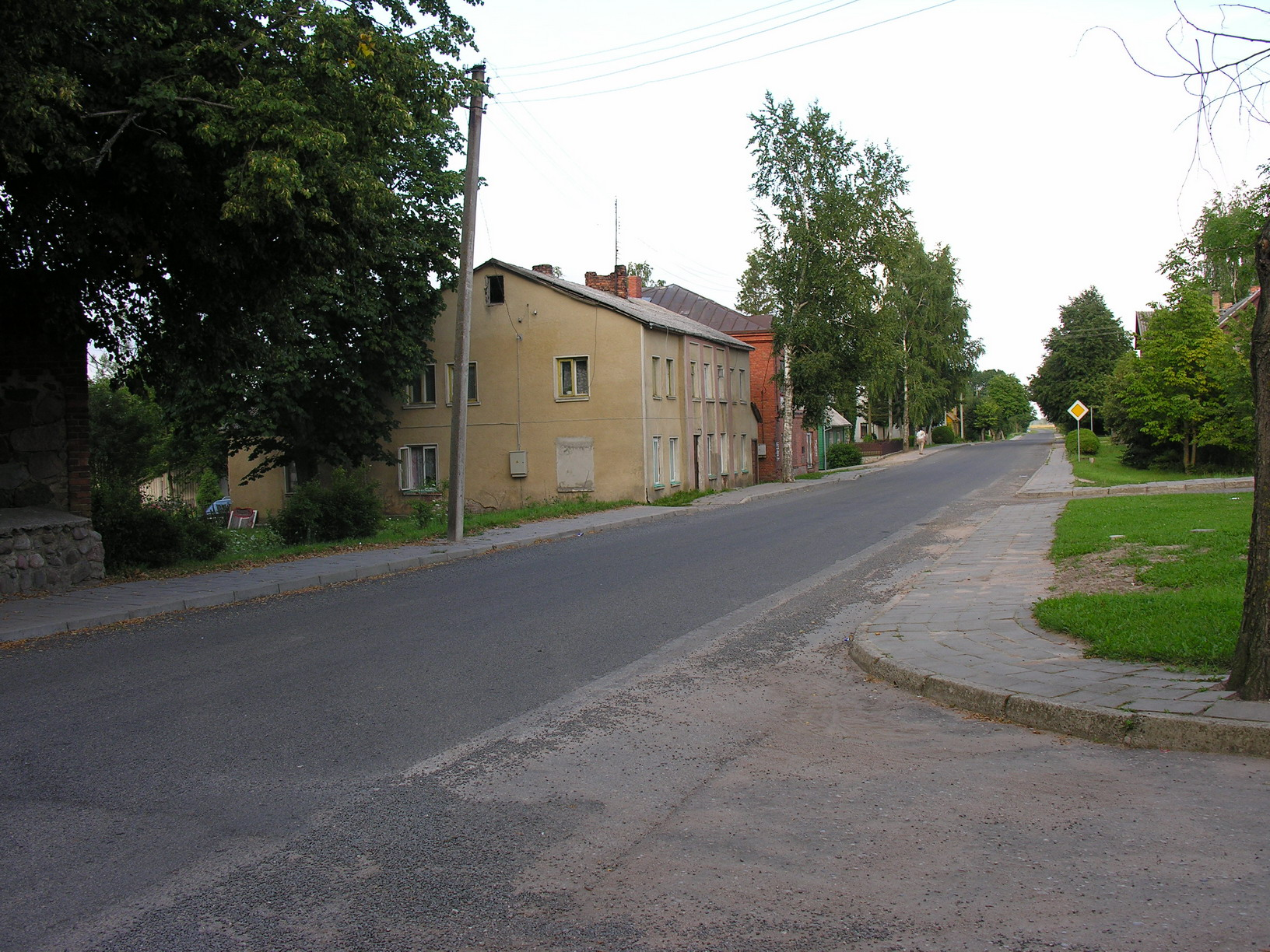

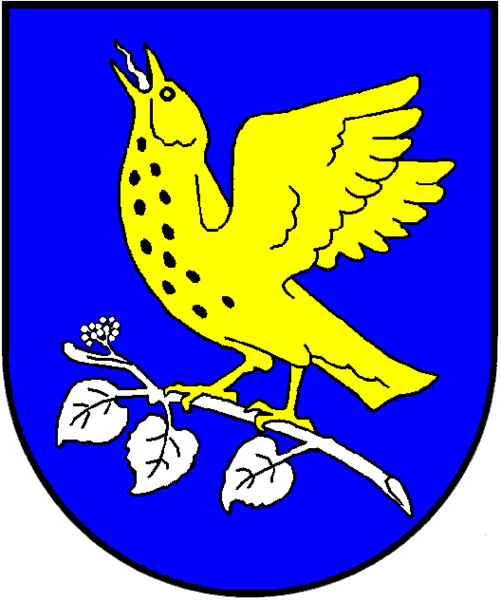
- Seal

- Location within Lithuania
- Coordinates: 56°22′52″N 22°33′40″E
- Country: Lithuania
- County: Telšiai County
- Municipality: Mažeikiai district municipality
- Eldership: Laižuva eldership

Population (2011)
  - Total: 485
- Time zone: UTC+2 (EET)
  - Summer (DST): UTC+3 (EEST)

Laižuva (Samogitian: Laižova) is a town in Telšiai County, Lithuania. According to the 2011 census, the town has a population of 485 people.
