= Lithuanian Nationalist Union =

Lithuanian Nationalist Union Lietuvių tautininkų sąjunga
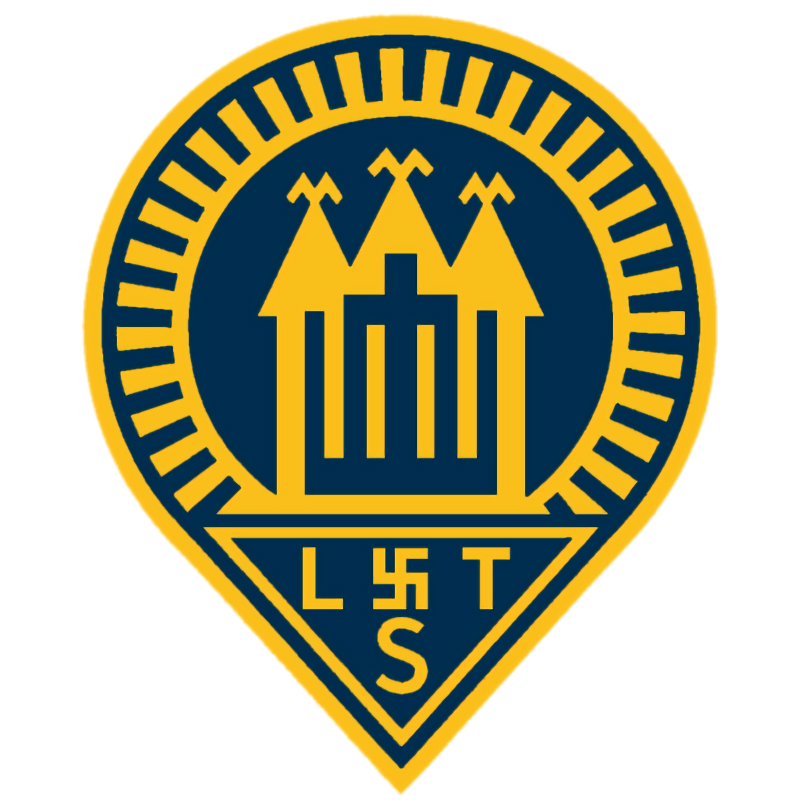
- Leader: Antanas Smetona
- Founded: August 1924; 102 years ago
- Dissolved: June 1940; 86 years ago
- Merger of: Party of National Progress; Economic and Political Union of Lithuanian Farmers
- Merged into: Lithuanian Activist Front
- Headquarters: Vilnius, Lithuania
- Newspaper: Lietuvis (1924–28); Lietuvos aidas (1928–40); Vairas (1929–40); Mūsų kraštas (1930–33)
- Youth wing: Young Lithuania
- Paramilitary wing: Geležinis Vilkas (1927–30)
- Ideology: Lithuanian nationalism Corporate statism Anti-communism
- Political position: Right-wing to far-right
- Religion: Roman Catholicism
- International affiliation: Fascist International (observer)
- Colours: Gold Blue
- Slogan: "Lithuania for Lithuanians!"
- Politics of Lithuania; Political parties; Elections; a: In the 1930s, the party became increasingly more radical and sympathetic to fascism.

The Lithuanian Nationalist Union (Lithuanian: Lietuvių tautininkų sąjunga or LTS), also known as the Nationalists (Tautininkai), was the ruling political party in Lithuania during the authoritarian regime of President Antanas Smetona from 1926 to 1940. The party was established in 1924 but was not popular. It came to power as a result of the December 1926 military coup. From 1927 to 1939, the Council of Ministers included only members of the LTS. In 1936, other parties were officially disbanded, leaving LTS the only legal party in the country. At the end of the 1930s new members started bringing in new ideas, right wing and closer to Italian fascism. The party was disestablished after the Soviet occupation of Lithuania in June 1940. A party of the same name (known as the Lithuanian Nationalist and Republican Union since 2017) was reestablished in 1990 and claimed to be the successor of the interwar LTS.

== History ==
The party was established during a conference in Šiauliai on 17–19 August 1924 as a merger of the Party of National Progress (established in 1916) and the Economic and Political Union of Lithuanian Farmers (established in 1919). The party did not enjoy popular support and in the May 1926 parliamentary elections won only three seats of 85. However, its leaders Antanas Smetona and Augustinas Voldemaras were popular and influential public figures. The party was conservative and nationalistic, and stressed the need for a strong army and a strong leader.

During the December 1926 coup, the military deposed the democratically elected government and invited Smetona to become the new president and Voldemaras the new prime minister. The Nationalists and the Lithuanian Christian Democrats formed a new government. However, the relationship between the two parties soon became tense. Christian Democrats regarded the coup as a temporary measure and wanted to hold new elections to the Seimas. In April 1927, Smetona dissolved the Seimas and Christian Democrats resigned from the government in May. New elections to Seimas were not called until 1936. The Nationalists remained the only party in the government until a political crisis after the German ultimatum regarding Klaipėda Region forced LTS to admit two members of the opposition to the Council of Ministers.

Voldemaras established Iron Wolf (Geležinis Vilkas) as a paramilitary wing of the Nationalists. In September 1929, Smetona removed Voldemaras and installed his co-brother-in-law Juozas Tūbelis as prime minister. The new constitutions of 1928 and 1938 established a presidential dictatorship. Political opponents were suppressed.

Ahead of the June 1936 election, other political parties were banned, leaving LTS the only legal party in Lithuania. In the 1930s, the party became increasingly radical and sympathetic to Italian Fascism but opposed Nazism.

Major periodicals published by the party included Lietuvis (1924–28), Lietuvos aidas (1928–40), Mūsų kraštas (1930–33), and Vairas (1914–40).

== Chairmen ==
The party's chairmen were:

- Vincas Krėvė-Mickevičius (19 August 1924 – 29 June 1925)
- Antanas Smetona (29 June 1925 – 26 December 1926)
- Liudas Noreika (26 December 1926 – 4 August 1927)
- Vincas Matulaitis (4 August 1927 – 1 October 1927)
- Aleksandras Žilinskas (5 October 1927 – 1 February 1928)
- Liudas Noreika (1 February 1928 – 30 May 1928)
- Vytautas Vileišis (30 May 1928 – 2 October 1929)
- Jonas Lapėnas (2 October 1929 – 1 June 1931)
- Juozas Tūbelis (1 June 1931 – 5 January 1939)
- Vladas Mironas (5 January 1939 – 2 December 1939)
- Domas Cesevičius (2 December 1939 – 19 June 1940)

== Election results ==
Seimas
Date	Votes			Seats		Position	Size
Date	No.	%	± pp	No.	±	Position	Size
May 1926	43,841	4.31	New	3 / 85	▲3	Opposition	7th
June 1936	?	?	New	42 / 49	▲39	Majority	1st
