= Janulaitis =

- Lithuanian surname
- m.: Janulaitis
- f.: (unmarried): Janulaitytė
- f.: (married): Janulaitienė

Janulaitis is a Lithuanian family name. Notable people with the surname include:

- Augustinas Janulaitis (1878–1950)
- Elena Janulaitienė (1893–1950)
- Julija Biliūnienė née Janulaitytė (1880–1978)
- Veronika Alseikienė née Janulaitytė (1883–1971)
