= Paknys =

- Lithuanian surname
- m.: Paknys
- f.: (unmarried): Paknytė
- f.: (married): Paknienė

Paknys is a Lithuanian surname. Notable people with the surname include

- Antanas Paknys (1910–1982), Lithuanian aviator, glider designer
- Juozas Paknys (1883–1948), Lithuanian politician and banker
- Lina Paknienė, married name of Lina Braknytė, Lithuanian actress
- Paulius Paknys, Lithuanian footballer
