= Vladas Stašinskas =

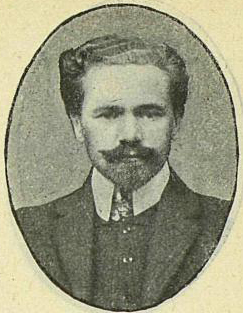
- Born: 10 October 1874; Dameliai, Kovno Governorate, Russian Empire
- Died: 11 March 1944 (aged 69); Kėdainiai, Lithuania
- Education: Imperial Moscow University
- Occupations: Lawyer, government minister, banker
- Employer: Bank of Lithuania
- Board member of: Lithuanian Bar Association
- Children: Vytautas Stašinskas

Vladas Stašinskas (Russian: Владисла́в Андре́евич Сташи́нский; 10 October 1874 – 11 March 1944) was a Lithuanian attorney, politician, and banker. In the Russian Empire, he was elected to the State Duma from the Kovno Governorate in 1907. In interwar Lithuania, he briefly served as the first Minister of Internal Affairs in 1918 and as Minister of Justice in 1938. He was the director of the Bank of Lithuania from 1930 to 1938.

== Biography ==
=== Early life and education ===
Vladas Stašinskas was born on 10 October 1874 in Dameliai to a Lithuanian family that rented land from the owners of the Žagarė Manor. He studied at Mitau Gymnasium where his classmate was the future President of Lithuania Antanas Smetona. As a high school student, Stašinskas belonged to Kūdikis Society, a secret Lithuanian student organization, and a group of activists that organized amateur performances of Lithuanian plays in Palanga, Libau (Liepāja), Mitau (Jelgava).

After graduating from the gymnasium in 1895, Stašinskas entered the law faculty of the Imperial Moscow University and graduated with a first-class diploma in 1902. He then returned to Lithuania and settled in Kaunas where he worked as an assistant to the sworn attorney Motiejus Lozoraitis (father of Stasys Lozoraitis). As an attorney, Stašinskas quickly built a good reputation and took on some political cases, including those of Lithuanian communists Vincas Kapsukas and Zigmas Angarietis, and future general Vladas Nagevičius.

=== State Duma ===
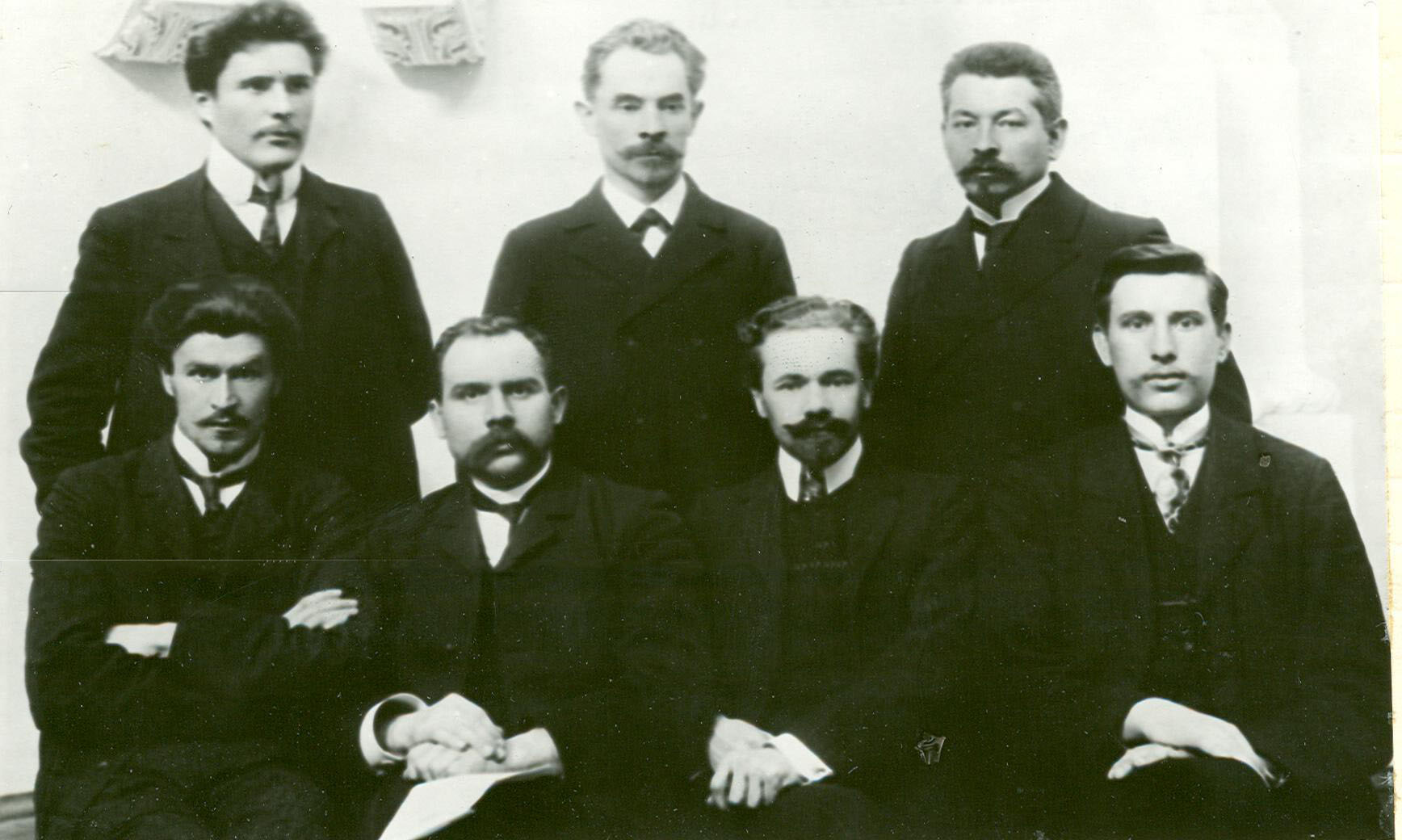
Lithuanian deputies of the State Duma of the 2nd convocation (1907)

In December 1905, Stašinskas participated in the Great Seimas of Vilnius and supported positions of the Social Democratic Party of Lithuania. While he sympathized with social democratic ideas, it is unclear if he officially joined the party. He later joined the Party of National Progress and the Lithuanian Nationalist Union (from 1928).

As a representative of the social democrats, he was elected to the State Duma of the 2nd convocation in the Kovno Governorate on 6 February 1907. During the Duma sessions, Stašinskas debated on the issues of education, land reform, Tsarist repressions in Lithuania. He was also a member of the committees on the state budget, local judiciary reform, and local self-government. The Duma was dissolved within three months in what became known as the Coup of June 1907. Stašinskas, along with other social democrats, was tried for publishing a proclamation in Skardas (a Lithuanian-language newspaper of the Social Democratic Party of Lithuania) that called for the confiscation of nobility's landholdings. He was sentenced to one year in Kaunas Prison.

=== World War I ===
At the start of World War I, Stašinskas moved to Vilnius where he joined Lithuanian political life. In June 1915, he was one of the co-founders of the Lithuanian Society for Agronomy and Legal Assistance to provide aid to war refugees (this was a leftist alternative to the Lithuanian Society for the Relief of War Sufferers). In fall 1915, he was a member of a multi-ethnic Citizens' Committee that interacted with the occupying German forces on behalf of the residents of Vilnius. In 1916, Stašinskas joined an informal political group of Lithuanian that discussed Lithuania's future after the war.

In September 1917, he attended Vilnius Conference that elected the 20-member Council of Lithuania. Stašinskas became the head clerk of the council. He was paid a monthly salary of 500 marks. In May 1918, he became assistant to council's vice-chairman Jurgis Šaulys. In April 1918, a group of jurists, including Stašinskas and Augustinas Janulaitis, agreed to assist the Council of Lithuania.

Stašinskas was invited to become the Minister of Internal Affairs in the first cabinet of Lithuania under Prime Minister Augustinas Voldemaras. Initially, Stašinskas and Petras Leonas refused to join the government protesting inclusion of the Catholic priest Juozas Purickis because he had to obey his ecclesiastical superiors. He held this post briefly, from 11 November to 26 December 1918. During this time, he issued orders on administrative subdivisions and organizing their local government institutions.

On 26 December 1918, he was appointed director of the State Control Office, but could not assume the role due to the start of the Lithuanian–Soviet War and the evacuation of the Lithuanian government to Kaunas. Stašinskas remained in Vilnius and was arrested by the Bolsheviks on 12 or 22 January 1919. Together with other prominent Lithuanians, including Mečislovas Reinys, Liudas Gira, Antanas Tumėnas, he remained in Soviet custody in Vilnius, Daugavpils, and Smolensk until a prisoner exchange on 23 July 1919.

=== Independent Lithuania ===
Stašinskas returned to Kaunas and continued to work as an attorney. His clients included the Bank of Lithuania and Kaunas City Municipality. In 1920, he became chairman of the Lithuanian Bar Association. He was reelected annually until 1926. He also assisted in organizing the Lithuanian Riflemen's Union.

In July 1930, Stašinskas visited Vilnius in a failed attempt to negotiate with Marshal of Poland Józef Piłsudski regarding the territorial conflict over Vilnius Region with the Second Polish Republic. In 1931, he represented Lithuania at the Permanent Court of International Justice. The case concerned reopening of a section of the Libau–Romny Railway between Lentvaris (on the Polish side) and Kaišiadorys (on the Lithuanian side). The court ruled in Lithuania's favor.

From June 1930 to September 1938, Stašinskas headed the Bank of Lithuania. According to the memoirs of Zigmas Toliušis, Stašinskas was a nominal leader who view the post as a sinecure. Historians consider Juozas Paknys as the actual leader of the bank during this time. During Stašinskas' tenure, the bank had to respond to the Great Depression, prevent commercial bank failures, and keep the Lithuanian litas stable.

On 30 September 1938, Stašinskas resigned from the bank to become the Minister of Justice in the cabinet of Prime Minister Vladas Mironas. However, the cabinet was disbanded just two months later, on 5 December 1938.

Stašinskas retired in March 1939 with a monthly state pension of 1,000 litas. After the Soviet occupation of Lithuania in June 1940, his landholdings of 195 hectares (480 acres) near Kėdainiai were confiscated and his pension was stopped. This left him in poor health and in poverty. A special commission of the Lithuanian Bar Association visited him in 1942 and found him in deplorable conditions, forced to sell personal belongings to make a living. He died on 11 March 1944 in Kėdainiai.

== Personal life ==
Stašinskas was married and had three children: two daughters and son Vytautas Stašinskas (1906–1967) who was the Lithuanian consul in New York.

In 1938, Stašinskas purchased the White Villa in Palanga from the Tyszkiewicz family. The villa was used a summer residence of President Antanas Smetona.
