= Eiguliai =

- Eldership
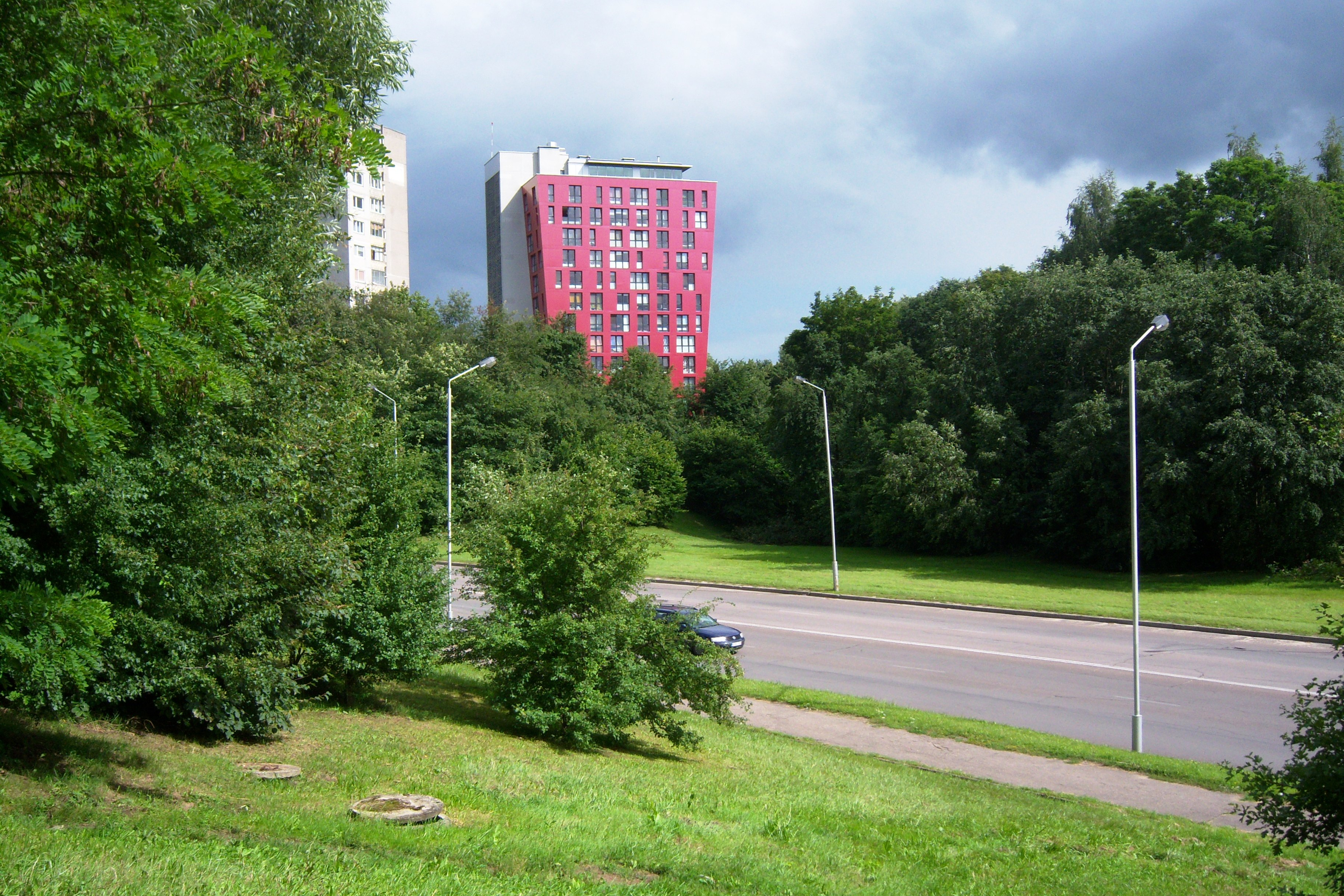
- Sukilėlių prospect

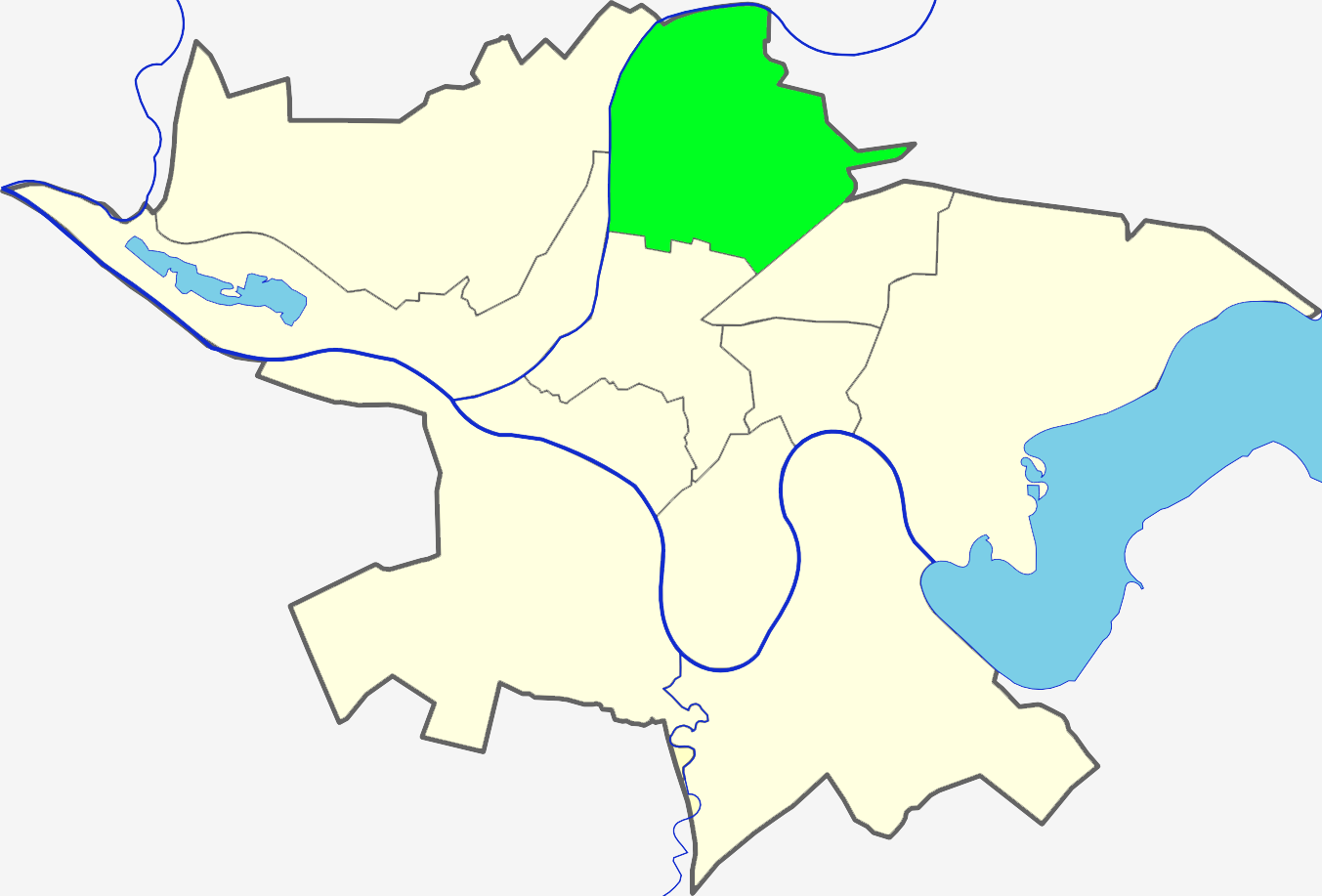
- Location of Eiguliai within Kaunas
- Coordinates: 54°56′N 23°56′E
- Country: Lithuania
- County: Kaunas County
- Municipality: Kaunas city municipality
- Elder of Eiguliai: Ovidijus Adomaitis

Population (2021)
  - Total: 39,371
- Time zone: UTC+2 (EET)
  - Summer (DST): UTC+3 (EEST)
- Area code: +370

Eiguliai is a neighborhood in the city of Kaunas, Lithuania. Eiguliai elderate encompass Eiguliai, Kleboniškis and part of Kalniečiai neighbourhoods. Elderate itself is located on the left bank of the Neris River. The distance from Eiguliai neighborhood to Kaunas centre is approximately 6 km. The settlement was a small village until it was incorporated into Kaunas in 1959 and a residential microdistrict was built in 1979. The 7th Fort of the Kaunas Fortress are located in this eldership. The borough borders Dainava in the east, Žaliakalnis in the south, Vilijampolė and Šilainiai in the west and Domeikava with Lapės in the north. It has 40,453 inhabitants which represent 13.82 % of the population of Kaunas city municipality. It has a microclimate, that makes eiguliai a subarctic climate (Koppen climate classification: Dfc). Eiguliai is one of 2 areas in Lithuania with a subarctic climate.

== Cemetery ==
A number of famous people were buried in the Eiguliai cemetery:

- Jonas Bulota (1855–1942), organist, veterinarian
- Stepas Butautas (1925–2001), sports activists
- Klemensas Čerbulėnas (1912–1986), ethnographer and art critic, architectural historian
- Valerija Čiurlionytė-Karužienė (1896–1991), cultural activist
- Saulius Gricius (1963–1991), deputy of Kaunas Council, leader of the Green political movement in Lithuania
- Dalia Grinkevičiūtė (1927–1987), doctor and writer about experiences of Lithuanian exiles near the Laptev Sea
- Bronė Kurmytė-Monkevičienė (1913–1975), actress
- Rapolas Okulič-Kazarinas (1856–1919), aviator, helped to organize the Lithuanian Armed Forces
- Petras Tarasenka (1892–1962), archaeologist, colonel
- Vytautas Rauba 1899-1920 aviator, helped to organize the Lithuanian Armed Forces First dead Lithuanian pilot who had his own medal
- Circus performers: Francas Černiauskas, Pranas Gudauskas, Maksimilianas Truci (Massimiliano Truzzi), Konstantinas Feroni, Mykolas Vilenčikas, Antanas Pilkauskas, Jonas Ramanauskas, Vladislava Variakojienė (Stankutė), Jadvyga Ramanauskienė (Stankutė) and others.
