= Aleksandra Vailokaitienė =

Lithuanian photographer

- Born: Aleksandra Jurašaitytė; 18 March 1895; Bielsk Podlaski?, Russian Empire
- Died: 17 January 1957 (aged 61); Fort Lauderdale, Florida, United States
- Occupation: Photographer
- Spouse: Jonas Vailokaitis
- Parent: Father Aleksandras Jurašaitis
- Relatives: Sister Elena Janulaitienė

Aleksandra Vailokaitienė née Jurašaitytė (18 March 1895 – 18 January 1957) was a Lithuanian photographer. In 1915, she inherited a photo studio from her father Aleksandras Jurašaitis and photographed the life and people in Vilnius during World War I. In 1917, she took a series of about 60 photos of shelters, soup kitchens, etc. maintained by the Lithuanian Society for the Relief of War Sufferers. She also photographed proceedings of Vilnius Conference in September 1917 and members of the Council of Lithuania. In January 1919, she married Jonas Vailokaitis, one of the members of the council and a successful businessman. She then moved to Kaunas leaving her photography career behind. After the Soviet occupation of Lithuania in June 1940, she escaped to Germany and then United States where she died in 1957.

== Biography ==
=== Photographer ===
Vailokaitienė was born on 18 March 1895 likely in Bielsk Podlaski, where her father photographer Aleksandras Jurašaitis had a photo studio. In 1904, Jurašaitis moved to Vilnius and became a popular photographer of various Lithuanian activists. When he died suddenly in 1915, the photo studio was taken over by Vailokaitienė and her mother Marija. Thus, Vailokaitienė became one of the first Lithuanian women photographers (the first was Paulina Mongird in Palanga). The photo studio continued to use printed signature of her father, thus her works are often mistakenly attributed to Jurašaitis.

Vailokaitienė photographed the life and people in Vilnius during World War I. In 1917, she took a series of about 60 photos of shelters, soup kitchens, etc. maintained by the Lithuanian Society for the Relief of War Sufferers in Vilnius. The images were collected into an album to showcase accomplishments of the society. A copy of the album was gifted to papal nuncio Achille Ratti (future Pope Pius XI).

She also photographed proceedings of Vilnius Conference in September 1917, even though together with 19 other active women she had signed a protest letter because no women were invited to the conference. She also took the famous photo of the twenty elected members of the Council of Lithuania which proclaimed Lithuania's independence on 16 February 1918. Several of the photos were published in Lietuvos aidas.

=== Family life ===
On 25 January 1919, she married Jonas Vailokaitis, banker, businessman, and one of the signatories of the Act of Independence of Lithuania. He became one of the richest men in interwar Lithuania. The couple moved to Kaunas and Vailokaitienė left her photography career behind. They had four children (three daughters and a son). She was an active member of the Lithuanian Christian Democratic Party and Baby Rescue Society (Kūdikių gelbėjimo draugija), engaged in charitable work. In 1937, she was one of the organizers of the Second Congress of Lithuanian Women (on the 20th anniversary of the First Congress of Lithuanian Women) and the First Exhibition of Lithuanian Women's Art.

Around 1930, Vailokaitis family built a luxurious six-floor house by architect Arno Funk in Kaunas. The house had multiple apartments which were rented out to others. The house was nationalized by the Soviets in 1940 and transferred to the Lithuanian Writers' Union. During the German occupation, the house was taken over by Theodor Adrian von Renteln, General Commissioner of Generalbezirk Litauen. The house was bombed in 1944 and later fully demolished.

After the Soviet occupation of Lithuania in June 1940, the family escaped to Nazi Germany. They first lived in Berlin, then in Blankenburg in Saxony-Anhalt. Vailokaitis died there on 16 December 1944. Vailokaitienė with two younger children moved to Detmold in the British occupation zone. In 1947, she moved to New Jersey, United States, where her two elder daughters lived. She owned a house on the Atlantic coast and lived on rent from tourists. She led a quiet life and died on 18 January 1957 in Fort Lauderdale while visiting her daughter.
