= Augustinas Janulaitis =

Lithuanian attorney, judge, and university professor

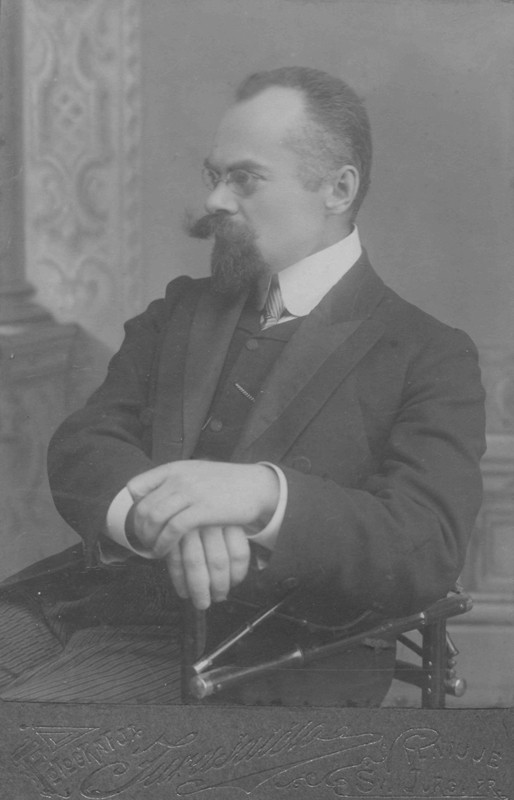
- Janulaitis in 1913
- Born: 31 March 1878; Malavėnai, Russian Empire
- Died: 22 May 1950 (aged 72); Kaunas, Lithuanian SSR
- Burial place: Petrašiūnai Cemetery
- Education: Imperial Moscow University; University of Bern
- Occupations: Attorney, judge, university professor, historian
- Employer(s): Supreme Tribunal of Lithuania; Vytautas Magnus University; Vilnius University
- Political party: Social Democratic Party of Lithuania
- Board member of: Lithuanian Scientific Society; Lithuanian Historical Society
- Spouse: Elena Janulaitienė
- Relatives: Sisters Julija Biliūnienė and Veronika Alseikienė
- Awards: Order of the Lithuanian Grand Duke Gediminas

Augustinas Janulaitis (1878–1950) was a Lithuanian attorney, judge, and university professor who specialized in the legal history of Lithuania.

Janulatis studied law at the Imperial Moscow University but was expelled for participating in the 1899 Russian student strike. He was active in Lithuanian public life. He smuggled and distributed prohibited Lithuanian press and performed in America in the Bathhouse, the first Lithuanian play staged in Palanga. For such activities, he was arrested by the Tsarist police but escaped to East Prussia in 1902 and later Switzerland. He joined the Social Democratic Party of Lithuania in 1901 and edited its newspaper Darbininkų balsas. He returned to Lithuania in 1906 and managed to complete his law degree at the University of Moscow in 1907. He then worked as an attorney and was active in public life in Vilnius.

At the start of the Lithuanian–Soviet War in December 1918, he briefly served as the acting Minister of Foreign Affairs. He then moved to Kaunas where he was appointed as a judge to the Supreme Tribunal of Lithuania. In 1919–1920, Janulaitis helped organizing the Higher Courses which were reorganized into the University of Lithuania in 1922. He taught mainly the legal history of Lithuania and became dean of the Faculty of Law in 1935. He was the founder and long-term chairman of the Lithuanian Historical Society. Janulaitis was a prolific author and published more than 660 books, articles, and other works.

He was transferred to Vilnius University in January 1940. He was one of the first academic members admitted to the Lithuanian Academy of Sciences in 1941. However, the Soviets criticized him for his apolitical stance and for publishing an anti-communist book in 1925. Reportedly, he was not arrested because he was terminally ill with cancer. He died in May 1950.

== Biography ==
=== Early life and education ===
Augustinas Janulaitis was born on 31 March [O.S. 19 March] 1878 in Malavėnai near Šiauliai, then part of the Russian Empire. The family had 13 children, nine of whom reached adulthood and five completed university education. He was the youngest son. His siblings included Catholic priest Pranciškus Janulaitis, ophthalmologist Veronika Alseikienė, and dentist Julija Biliūnienė.

In 1886, he enrolled at the Šiauliai Gymnasium. As a high school student, he collected 144 Lithuanian folk songs, 73 of which were published in the journal of the Lithuanian Literary Society in 1898–1899. He started compiling a collection of Lithuanian war songs, but it was not published. He was expelled from the gymnasium in 1893 because he had violated the Lithuanian press ban – he was found in the possession of Lithuanian-language publications. He then moved to Riga and graduated from the Nicholas I Gymnasium in Riga in 1896. He studied law at the Imperial Moscow University until 1899 when he was expelled for participating in the Russian student strike.

=== Lithuanian activist ===
As a student, Janulaitis actively participated in the Lithuanian National Revival. He participated in a campaign organized by Lithuanian periodicals Varpas and Ūkininkas to get the press ban lifted. Janulaitis distributed proclamations and collected signatures for petitions to the Tsar. He also smuggled and distributed Lithuanian publications in and near Šiauliai. Vaclovas Biržiška, at the time a student at the Šiauliai Gymnasium, later credited Janulaitis as the person who introduced him to Lithuanian publications. Janulaitis' articles were printed in Varpas, Ūkininkas, Vienybė lietuvninkų. His associates included Povilas Višinskis, Petras Avižonis, Jonas Biliūnas.

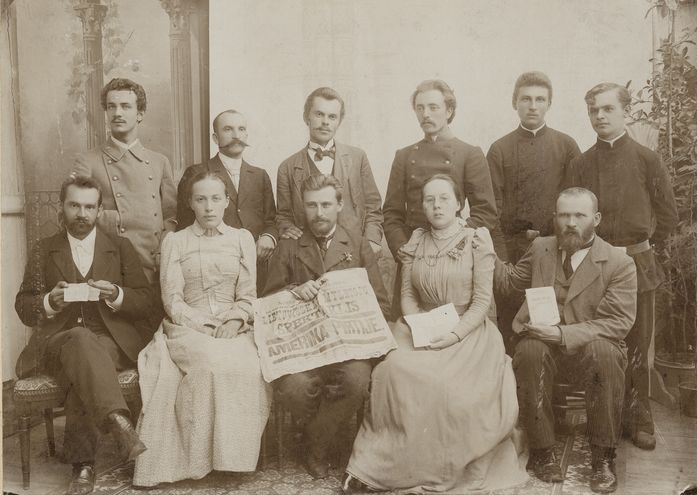
Janulaitis (standing third from left) among the performers of America in the Bathhouse in 1899

In August 1899, he played the role of Antanas in America in the Bathhouse in Palanga – the first Lithuanian-language theater performance in present-day Lithuania. He reprised the role when the play was staged again in Liepāja in January 1900. He also staged a Lithuanian play based on Marriage by Nikolai Gogol in Šiauliai. Such activities attracted attention from the Tsarist police which investigated Liudas Vaineikis. Janulaitis was arrested in 1900 when the police found an anti-Tsarist brochure and a list of Lithuanian books in his apartment. He spent about 6.5 months in prisons in Liepāja and Aizpute. He was released on a 300 ruble bail. In February 1902, he was sentenced to three years of exile to Siberia, but he managed to escape to East Prussia, then to Scotland and Switzerland where he continued to study law at the University of Bern until 1905.

He joined the Social Democratic Party of Lithuania in 1901 and was elected to its Central Committee (he left the party in 1922). From May 1902 to the end of 1905, Janulaitis edited Darbininkų balsas, the newspaper of the Social Democratic Party printed by Martynas Jankus. Janulaitis became the first to translate into Lithuanian The Communist Manifesto by Karl Marx and Friedrich Engels (published by Jankus in 1904). Later, in 1912, he also translated and published Socialism: Utopian and Scientific by Engels. These two translations were the first translations of classical communist literature into Lithuanian. In 1900–1905, Janulaitis published several political brochures mainly based on works by Polish authors. Written for the general public, these publications reflected socialist and nationalist ideas.

=== Attorney and activist in Vilnius ===
In 1906, Janulaitis returned to Lithuania with a fake passport. He was caught at the border and tried in Vilnius for importing prohibited publications from Germany. He was sentenced to ten months in prison. He served the time in Lukiškės Prison. He then managed to get readmitted to the Imperial Moscow University and complete his law degree in 1907. In 1907–1916 and 1918–1919, Janulaitis lives in Vilnius and practiced as an attorney. He worked as an assistant attorney to Jonas Vileišis and Tadeusz Wróblewski before obtaining the full attorney license in 1912.

Janulaitis continued to be active in Lithuanian cultural life. Together with Mykolas Biržiška, he briefly edited Žarija, a periodical of the Social Democratic Party of Lithuania. He also published numerous articles in Vilniaus žinios, Lietuvos žinios, Visuomenė. He collected and prepared for publication works of his brother-in-law Jonas Biliūnas. He joined the Lithuanian Scientific Society in 1908 and was elected to its board in 1914–1918. He presented ten research papers at the society, second only to its founder Jonas Basanavičius who presented 15. In 1915, Janulaitis was elected to a commission of the Scientific Society tasked with the publication of Lithuanian textbooks. He was also a member of the Lithuanian Literary Society.

In May 1915, he became a board member of the Agronomic and Legal Aid which organized aid to war refugees. When Germany occupied Vilnius during World War I, Janulaitis joined the Lithuanian Society for the Relief of War Sufferers. In March 1916, he became a member of the commission that organized a census in Vilnius to determine the city's ethnic composition. He was associated with a small Lithuanian political club which debated Lithuania's post-war future. For this involvement, he was arrested in November 1916. The location of his imprisonment is variously given as either a prisoner camp in Czersk (East Prussia) or a concentration camp in Vokė (Lithuania). During this time, he translated Outline of Sociology by Ludwig Gumplowicz which was published in 1929. He was released in late 1917 and returned to Vilnius in early 1918. He worked as editorial staff of Darbo balsas and taught at the Lithuanian Gymnasium in Vilnius.

At the start of the Lithuanian–Soviet War in December 1918, Lithuanian Prime Minister and Minister of Foreign Affairs Augustinas Voldemaras departed for Germany to ask for financial assistance. Janulaitis was the administrator of the Ministry of Foreign Affairs and, in Voldemaras' absence, became the acting minister. However, his government career lasted only about three weeks as the government evacuated to Kaunas while Janulaitis remained in Vilnius.

=== Judge in Kaunas ===
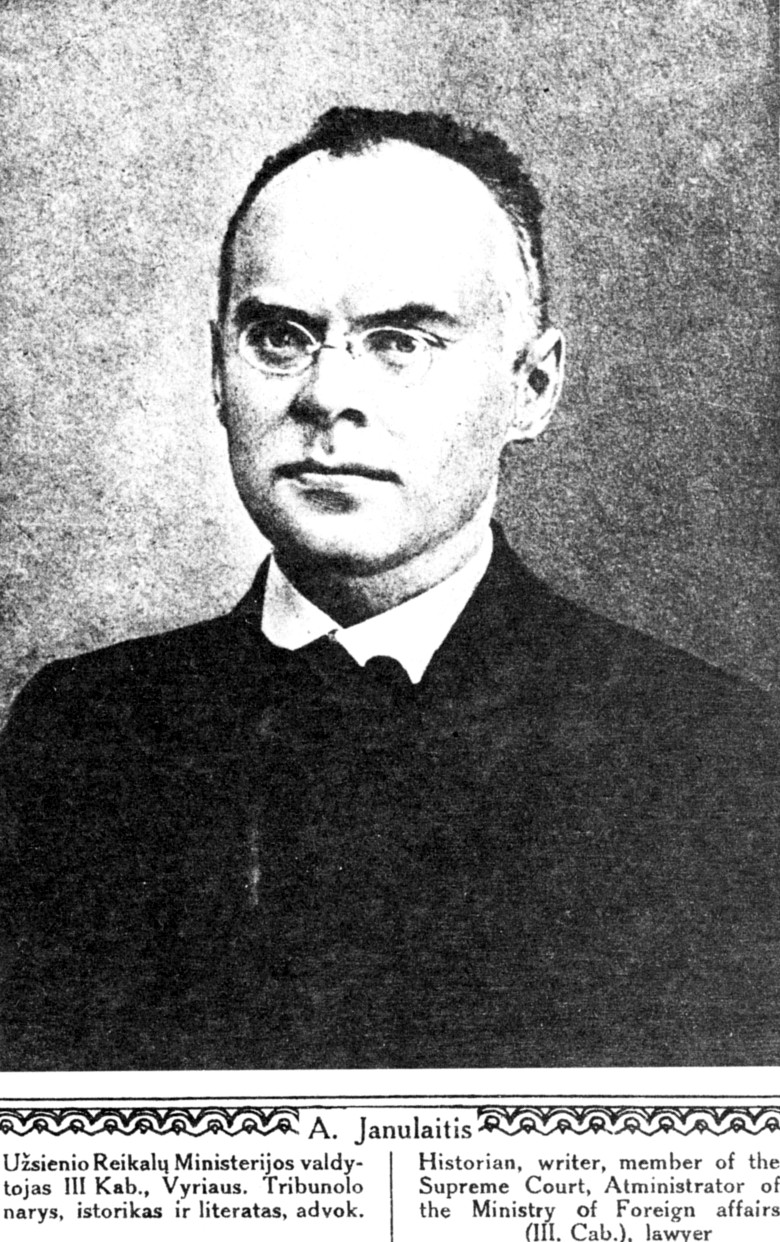
Janulaitis in Lithuania Album published in 1921

In April 1918, a group of jurists agreed to assist the Council of Lithuania. In May 1918, Janulaitis, as a member of this commission, presented the council with a historical overview of courts in Lithuania and particularly of the medieval Lithuanian Tribunal. This overview was used by the Lithuanian government to establish a new court system that replaced the Russian system that existed since the judicial reform of Alexander II in 1864. Janulaitis published the medieval law on the tribunal in 1927.

Janulaitis was appointed as chairman of the Vilnius District Court, but could not start the work due to the Lithuanian–Soviet War. He was briefly arrested by the authorities of the newly proclaimed Lithuanian Soviet Socialist Republic in January 1919. He moved to Kaunas and was appointed as a judge to the Supreme Tribunal of Lithuania on 26 May 1919. He was the second judge to join the court and was its acting chairman until Antanas Kriščiukaitis arrived to Kaunas in June 1919. In December 1919, Janulaitis became a member of the commission tasked with drafting the Constitution of Lithuania which was adopted in 1922.

He worked at the tribunal until 6 May 1925 when he was reassigned as chairman of the District Court of Panevėžys. This was done by Prime Minister Antanas Tumėnas without the consent of Janulaitis and it caused a political scandal. Opponents of Tumėnas accused him of intervening in court affairs and undermining tribunal's independence. Janulaitis was returned to the Supreme Tribunal on 24 September 1926.

In 1933–1935, Janulaitis worked as an attorney. He prepared cassation cases and often represented the Ministry of Agriculture. He was dismissed as an attorney in September 1935. He briefly resumed attorney work in 1944.

=== University professor ===
In 1919–1920, Janulaitis was a member of the commission tasked with organizing the Higher Courses. Once the courses were established, Janulaitis headed their legal section and taught legal history. When the courses were reorganized into the University of Lithuania in 1922, he became chair of the Department of the Legal History of Lithuania at the new university. He taught primarily the legal history of Lithuania (which was a mandatory class for first-year law students), but also taught selected topics from the history of Lithuania (e.g. history of serfdom, Uprising of 1831). His legal history lectures were not published as a textbook, therefore students printed some lectures notes in 1932–1933.

He was recognized as a tenured professor in 1924 and received doctorate in law in 1932. He became dean of the Faculty of Law in 1935. He was offered the position back in 1922, but refused because at the time he did not have an advanced degree and worked as a judge. He also lectured at the Dotnuva Agricultural Academy and Higher Officers' Courses. He edited university's academic law journals Teisės mokslų bibliotekos darbai (27 volumes in 1924–1939), Teisės fakulteto darbai (volumes 2–10 in 1928–1939), and Teisės ir ekonomijos studijos (2 volumes in 1936–1938). In 1921, he was elected to the editorial board of historical journal Mūsų senovė.

In 1922–1925, Janulaitis was chairman of the State Archaeological Commission. He resigned from the commission in protest of lack of funding. In May 1929, the founding meeting of the Lithuanian Historical Society was held in Janulaitis apartment. He became society's long-term chairman and editor of its journal Praeitis (two volumes in 1930 and 1933). The society became inactive after the history section was established at the Institute for Lithuanian Studies. Janulaitis was also chairman of the history section at the Military Science Society as well as a board member of the Lithuanian Society of Lawyers. He was a member of the Masonic lodge established by Michał Pius Römer in Kaunas in 1920. Janulaitis was a member of the Lithuanian Riflemen's Union and was elected to its court of honor in 1936–1937 and 1938–1940.

To further his historical research, Janulaitis collected old historical documents. He conducted his research at several archives, including in Berlin (1921–1922), Polish Library in Paris (1924), Königsberg (1935). He also participated in various conferences, including the congress of Baltic attorneys in Kaunas in 1931, the conference of Baltic historians in Riga in 1937 and the 8th International Congress of Historical Sciences in Zürich in 1938.

=== In Soviet Lithuania ===
When Lithuania gained Vilnius, he was transferred to Vilnius University in January 1940. After the Soviet occupation of Lithuania, he signed a public statement of support for the Union of the Working People of Lithuania in the rigged elections to the People's Seimas in July 1940. Despite this, the new Soviet regime demoted Janulaitis (Vaclovas Biržiška replaced him as the dean of the Law Faculty). Janulaitis and twelve others became the first members of the newly established Lithuanian Academy of Sciences in April 1941.

In 1945, Janulaitis became the dean of the History Philology Faculty of Vilnius University but was dismissed in July 1946. The Soviets criticized Janulaitis for "twisting the history of Lithuania" and "inciting prejudice among the students against the Russian nation." In 1947, Antanas Sniečkus, the First Secretary of the Lithuanian Communist Party, accused Janulaitis of keeping an apolitical stance and avoiding expressing opinions on the current political situation. Sniečkus indicated that Janulaitis had expressed his political opinions in the past and specifically pointed out to anti-communist Lietuva ir šiuolaikinė Rusija (Lithuania and Modern Russia) published in 1925. Janulaitis published other works critical of Russia and communism. For example, in 1946–1947, he wrote a manuscript which criticized efforts of Russian historians to portray the Lithuanians as a Russian people. During the Soviet period, Janulaitis published just one short article about the historian Teodor Narbutt, even though he continued working on studies of the legal history of Lithuania.

According to his niece Meilė Lukšienė, Soviet authorities made a decision to arrest Janulaitis in early 1950. But at the time he was already terminally ill with cancer and the arrest was avoided. Janulaitis died on 22 May 1950 in Kaunas and was buried in the Petrašiūnai Cemetery. The funeral was an official event due to the efforts of Juozas Bulavas.

== Works ==
Janulaitis was a prolific author. He published some 70 brochures and books. His bibliography published in 1972 had 665 entries. Many other studies remained in unpublished manuscripts. He published studies on Lithuanian history, politics, and culture. He published 45 biographies about 30 people of the 19th and 20th centuries. as well as contributed encyclopedic articles to Lietuviškoji enciklopedija. He was the first to write about the legal history of Lithuania in Lithuanian. He critically evaluated Polish historiography which focused on the role of szlachta (nobles) and instead emphasized the role of peasants and the common folk. Unlike other Lithuanian historians who tried to "cleanse" the history of Lithuania from foreign influences, Janulaitis was genuinely interested in the history of the Lithuanian Jews and considered it an integral part of the history of Lithuania.

Janulaitis was a strong adherent to the historical method based on the careful and critical analysis of primary sources. The method was propagated by Charles Seignobos and Charles-Victor Langlois. Janulaitis often selected a narrow topic and attempted to review and utilize all available primary and secondary sources. The adoption of this rigorous method led Janulaitis to conflicts with romantic historians, most notably with Jonas Basanavičius. Janulaitis published a brochure criticizing Basanavičius, Jonas Šliūpas, Vincas Pietaris and their theories about the origins of the Lithuanian nation (first edition in 1903, second in 1907). Thus he became the first to criticize romantic theories on the ethnogenesis of Lithuanians.

Janulaitis started publishing historical articles in 1910. His first articles concerned the struggles of Lithuanian peasants during the Uprising of 1831 and Šiauliai Revolt in 1769. These articles are significant since Janulaitis used archival documents of the Šiauliai Economy that were lost during World War I. These studies were also the first studies by a Lithuanian historian primarily based on archival sources.

He also published works of fiction – he prepared works of Jonas Biliūnas for publication, translated works of Heinrich Heine and Fyodor Dostoevsky. In an attempt to provide Lithuanian theater with material, he translated a number of plays by Herman Heijermans, Nikolai Gogol, Arne Garborg, Ludwig Thoma, Henrik Ibsen, Adolf Nowaczyński, Friedrich Schiller, but published only three plays by Ibsen and one by Nowaczyński.

=== Major publications ===
Majors publications of Janulaitis include:

- Janulaitis, Augustinas (1913). Simonas Daukantas. OCLC 7191732.
- Janulaitis, Augustinas (1916). Lietuvos visuomenės ir teisės istorija [History of the Lithuanian Society and Law]. OCLC 63569816.
- Janulaitis, Augustinas (1921). 1863–1864 m. sukilimas [Uprising of 1863–1864]. OCLC 63569648.
- Janulaitis, Augustinas (1923). Kunigai ir 1831 m. revoliucija Lietuvoje [Priests and the Revolution of 1831 in Lithuania]. OCLC 166063532.
- Janulaitis, Augustinas (1923). Žydai Lietuvoje [Jews in Lithuania]. OCLC 84877426.
- Janulaitis, Augustinas (1927). Vyriausiasis Lietuvos Tribunolas XVI–XVIII amž [Lithuanian Tribunal in the 16–18th Centuries]. OCLC 219795526.
- Janulaitis, Augustinas (1927). Imperijos rūmų teismas (1495–1806) [Imperial Chamber Court (1495–1806)]. OCLC 70361446.
- Janulaitis, Augustinas (1928). Užnemunė po Prūsais (1795–1807) [Suvalkija under Prussia (1795–1807)]. OCLC 78979504.
- Janulaitis, Augustinas (1930). Napoleono teisynas [Napoleonic Code]. OCLC 219795602.
- Janulaitis, Augustinas (1932). Ignas Danilavičius. OCLC 7191736.
- Janulaitis, Augustinas (1936). Lietuvos bajorai ir jų seimeliai XIX amž [Lithuanian Nobles and their Sejmiks in the 19th Century]. OCLC 70352938.
- Janulaitis, Augustinas (1969). Mikalojus Akelaitis. OCLC 1422474.
- Janulaitis, Augustinas (1989). Praeitis ir jos tyrimo rūpesčiai [The Past and Its Research Concerns]. Mokslas. ISBN 9785420000441.
- Janulaitis, Augustinas (1998). Lietuvos didysis kunigaikštis Kęstutis [Grand Duke of Lithuania Kęstutis]. Kardas. ISBN 9789986636243.

== Personal library ==
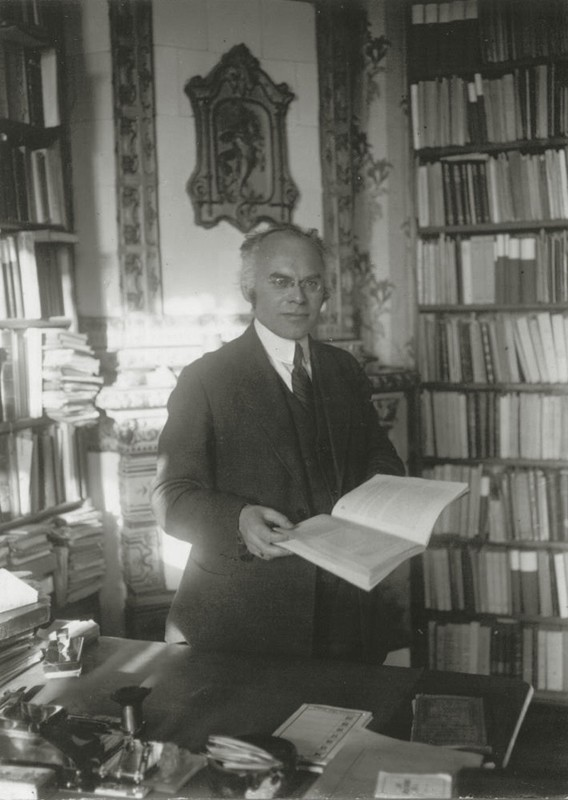
Janulatis in his study (before 1932)

Janulaitis amassed a large personal library, of which 13,685 titles (14,763 items) were donated to the present-day Kaunas County Public Library in 1965. More than 90% of the collection are publications in Russian, German, and Polish, with Lithuanian publications making up less than 5%. Other works are in French, Latin, English, etc. Some of the works are handwritten copies of published texts. About a quarter of the collection consists of articles from various periodicals. They are frequently compiled into books based on topic or author. There are 1,215 such compilations in Russian. 353 items in the collection are theses, vast majority in German. The oldest thesis is by Christoph Hartknoch from 1674. Overall, the oldest publication is a Latin collection of letters and works by Pope Pius II published in 1518. In total, 265 books in the collection were published before 1850.

Janulaitis acquired the publications by various means. Some were gifted by their authors (at least 107 books), others were acquired via acquaintances. For example, books were sent by Balys Sruoga from Russia and by Petras Klimas from France. Janulaitis purchased publications from numerous bookstores – known bookstores number 68 in 28 cities in five countries. His surviving correspondence shows that he often purchased on account and was not timely settling it. He also acquired books from other private collections and libraries.

== Legacy ==
In 1928, Janulaitis was awarded the Order of the Lithuanian Grand Duke Gediminas (4th degree).

In 1940, a monument to Lithuanian book smugglers was built in the garden of the Vytautas the Great War Museum which listed a hundred names of prominent book smugglers, including Janulaitis. The monument was demolished by Soviet authorities in 1950 and rebuilt in 1997.

In 1967, his widow Elena Jurašaitytė donated his archives to the Wroblewski Library of the Lithuanian Academy of Sciences. They were organized and described by his niece Meilė Lukšienė (work completed in 1985). The archive contains 3,958 documents. The archive contains materials from Janulaitis' life, his manuscripts of published and unpublished studies, and a collection of various 16th–20th century documents.

In 1978, a memorial plaque was affixed the house in Kaunas where Janulaitis lived. The building was built by Janulaitis in 1932 according to the plans by modernist architect Arnas Funkas. It was added to the Registry of Cultural Heritage in 2004.

In 1978, the Lithuanian Institute of History organized a conference on the occasion of the 100th birth anniversary of Janualaitis. In 2018, the Wroblewski Library of the Lithuanian Academy of Sciences held a month-long exhibition about Janulaitis' life and work on the occasion of his 140th anniversary.

In 2016, a street in Šilainiai (neighborhood of Kaunas) was named after Janulaitis.

== Personal life ==
Janulaitis married Elena Jurašaitytė (1893–1982), daughter of photographer Aleksandras Jurašaitis. Her sister Aleksandra was the wife of Jonas Vailokaitis, banker and signatory of the Act of Independence of Lithuania. Jurašaitytė and Janulaitis had one son Kęstutis (born 1934).

== Bibliography ==
- Andriulis, Vytautas (29 April 2022) [2018]. "Augustinas Janulaitis". Visuotinė lietuvių enciklopedija (in Lithuanian). Mokslo ir enciklopedijų leidybos centras.
- Andriulis, Vytautas; Maksimaitis, Mindaugas; Pakalniškis, Vytautas; Pečkaitis, Justinas Sigitas; Šenavičius, Antanas (2002). Lietuvos teisės istorija (in Lithuanian). Vilnius: Justitia. ISBN 9986-567-81-5.
- Bagušauskas, Juozapas Romualdas; Streikus, Arūnas (2005). Lietuvos kultūra sovietinės ideologijos nelaisvėje, 1940–1990: dokumentų rinkinys (in Lithuanian). Vilnius: Lietuvos gyventojų genocido ir rezistencijos tyrimo centras. pp. 63–65. ISBN 9986-757-68-1.
- Bitautas, Algis; Tamošaitis, Mindaugas (2016). "Janulaitis Augustinas" (PDF). In Tamošaitis, Mindaugas; Bitautas, Algis; Svarauskas, Artūras (eds.). Lietuvos Respublikos 1918–1940 m. vyriausybių ministrų biografinis žodynas (in Lithuanian). Vilnius: Mokslo ir enciklopedijų leidybos centras. pp. 200–203. ISBN 978-5-420-01778-4.
- Brensztejn, Michał (1919). Spisy ludności m. Wilna za okupacji niemieckiej od d. 1 listopada 1915 r. (in Polish). Warsaw.
- Bumblys, Voldemaras (2012). Lietuvos teisinė kultūra ir Antano Kriščiukaičio indėlis (PDF) (Ph.D. thesis) (in Lithuanian). Mykolas Romeris University. pp. 133, 139. ISBN 978-9955-19-456-9.
- Čepėnas, Pranas, ed. (1972). Lietuvos Universitetas 1579–1803–1922 (in Lithuanian). Chicago: The Association of Lithuanian-American Professors. OCLC 2152067.
- Čepėnas, Pranas (1986). Naujųjų laikų Lietuvos istorija. Vol. II. Chicago: Dr. Kazio Griniaus Fondas. OCLC 3220435.
- Gieda, Aurelijus (2017). Manifestuojanti Klėja. Istorikai ir istorika Lietuvoje 1883–1940 metais (in Lithuanian). Vilnius: Vilniaus universiteto leidykla. ISBN 9786094598616.
- Girnius, Juozas, ed. (1958). "Lietuvių Draugija Nukentėjusiems Nuo Karo Gyventojams Agronomijos Ir Teisių Pagalbai Teikti". Lietuvių enciklopedija (in Lithuanian). Vol. 16. Juozas Kapočius. p. 38.
- Janulaitytė-Biliūnienė-Matjošaitienė, Julija; Lukšienė, Meilė (2004). Laiko prasmės. Julijos Biliūnienės Matjošaitienės atsiminimai. Dukters pasvarstymai: medžiaga besiformuojančios lietuvių inteligentijos mentalitetui suvokti (in Lithuanian). Vilnius: Lietuvių literatūros ir tautosakos institutas.
- Kastėnė, Jurgita (23 June 2018). ""Lietuvos albume" 1921-aisiais – ir keturiolika moterų (III d.)" (in Lithuanian). Etaplius.
- Kauno apskrities viešoji biblioteka. "Janulaitis Augustinas". Žymūs Kauno žmonės: atminimo įamžinimas (in Lithuanian).
- Kazlauskienė, Rūta; Žilys, Saulius; Simanavičius, Mindaugas (20 March 2018). "Lietuvių tautai ir valstybei: Augustinui Janulaičiui – 140" (in Lithuanian). Wroblewski Library of the Lithuanian Academy of Sciences.
- Klimka, Libertas (2011). "Vilniaus Vytauto Didžiojo gimnazijos įkūrimo aplinkybės ir pirmieji jos dešimtmečiai" (PDF). In Bronė Puchovičienė, Danutė; Raščiuvienė, Irena; Zabarskaitė, Jolanta (eds.). Vilniaus Vytauto Didžiojo gimnazijos protokolai: (1915–1940 ir 1953–1955 metai) (in Lithuanian). Vilnius: Europos kalbų ir kultūrų dialogo tyrėjų asociacija. pp. 25–42. ISBN 9786094201783.
- Kultūros paveldo departamentas. "Profesoriaus Augustino Janulaičio namas". Kultūros vertybių registras (in Lithuanian).
- Lasinskas, Povilas (2004). Istorijos mokslas Vytauto Didžiojo universitete 1922–1940 metais (in Lithuanian). Vilnius: Vaga. ISBN 5415017143.
- Lebedys, Julius (1978). "A. Janulaitis – marksizmo klasikų vertėjas" (PDF). Lietuvos istorijos metraštis (in Lithuanian): 19, 22.
- Liekis, Algimantas (2001). Lietuvos mokslų akademija, 1941-1990. Lietuvos mokslas (in Lithuanian). Vol. 31. Lietuvos mokslas. ISBN 9986-795-10-9.
- Liekis, Algimantas (2011). Juodieji Lietuvos istorijos puslapiai (PDF) (in Lithuanian). Vol. II. Mokslotyros institutas. p. 48. ISBN 978-9986-795-67-4.
- Lukšienė, Meilė (2014). Prie tautos kultūros pamatų (in Lithuanian). Vilnius: Lietuvos Respublikos švietimo ir mokslo ministerijos Švietimo aprūpinimo centras. ISBN 978-9986-03-670-8.
- Maksimaitis, Mindaugas (2005). Lietuvos valstybės konstitucijų istorija (XX a. pirmoji pusė) (in Lithuanian). Vilnius: Justitia. ISBN 9955-616-09-1.
- Maksimaitis, Mindaugas (2014). "Lietuvos Vyriausiasis Tribunolas XX amžiuje". Jurisprudencija (in Lithuanian). 2 (21): 442. doi:10.13165/JUR-14-21-2-06. ISSN 2029-2058.
- Merkys, Vytautas (1985–1988). "Janulaitis Augustinas". In Zinkus, Jonas; et al. (eds.). Tarybų Lietuvos enciklopedija (in Lithuanian). Vol. II. Vilnius: Vyriausioji enciklopedijų redakcija. OCLC 20017802.
- Misius, Kazys (2020). "Valstybės archeologijos komisijai 100 metų" (PDF). Kultūros paminklai (in Lithuanian). 24: 48–49. ISSN 1392-155X.
- Nefas, Mindaugas (2019). Dvasios aristokratai: Lietuvos šaulių sąjungos siekiai ir realybė 1919–1940 m. (in Lithuanian). Versus. ISBN 978-9955-829-22-5.
- Nekrašius, Jonas (6 December 2018). "Iškilieji šiauliečiai. Šviesuolių Janulaičių gyvenimo ir darbų keliais" (in Lithuanian). Šiaulių naujienos.
- Selenis, Valdas (2007). Lietuvos istorikų bendrija 1918–1944 metais: kolektyvinės biografijos tyrimas (in Lithuanian). Vilniaus pedagoginio universiteto leidykla. ISBN 978-9955-20-183-0.
- Selenis, Valdas (2015). "Augustinas Janulaitis – novatorius visuomenininkas ir istorikas". In Bitautas, Algis (ed.). Edvardas Kriščiūnas: Mokslinių straipsnių rinkinys, skirtas Edvardo Kriščiūno atminimui (in Lithuanian). Vilnius: Lietuvos edukologijos universiteto leidykla. pp. 107–117. ISBN 9786094710179.
- Sirutavičius, Vladas (4 March 2020) [2018]. "Augustinas Janulaitis Collection". COURAGE: Cultural Opposition: Understanding the Cultural Heritage of Dissent in the Former Socialist Countries.
- Surblys, Alvydas (2002). "Augustinas Janulaitis – knygų kolekcionierius: leidinių įsigijimo keliai ir būdai". Kauno istorijos metraštis (in Lithuanian). 3: 217–230. ISSN 2335-8734.
- Sužiedėlis, Saulius (2004). "The Historical Sources for Antisemitism in Lithuania and Jewish-Lithuanian Relations during the 1930s". In Nikžentaitis, Alvydas; Schreiner, Stefan; Staliūnas, Darius (eds.). The Vanished World of Lithuanian Jews. Rodopi. p. 121. ISBN 90-420-0850-4.
- Vaišvilienė, Regina (22 June 2021). "Minėdami Mariją Gimbutienę, pagerbkime ir jos tėvus – gydytojus Alseikas". Mokslo Lietuva (in Lithuanian). 10 (675). ISSN 1392-7191.
- Vaitkevičienė, Daiva (2021). "Prie gyvybės medžio šaknų: Marija Gimbutienė šeimos moterų draugijoje". Tautosakos darbai (in Lithuanian). 62: 107. ISSN 1392-2831.
- Valužytė, Jūratė (1987). "Akademiko Augustino Janulaičio rankraštinis palikimas" (PDF). Lietuvos istorijos metraštis (in Lithuanian): 165–172.
- Vidmantas, Edvardas (1979). Lietuvos darbininkų periodinė spauda, 1895–1917 (in Lithuanian). Mintis. pp. 30, 32. OCLC 6195352.
- Žostautaitė, Petronėlė (1978). "Augustino Janulaičio 100-osios gimimo metinės" (PDF). Lietuvos istorijos metraštis (in Lithuanian): 143–144.
