= Petras Tarasenka =

Lithuanian archaeologist (1892–1962)

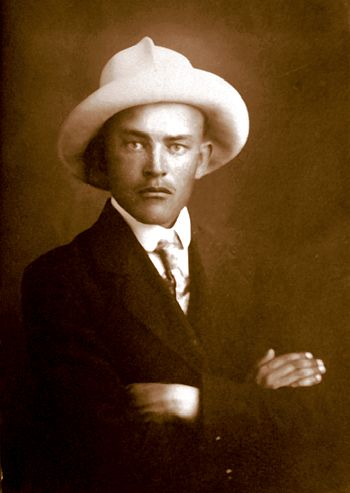
- Petras Tarasenka in Alanta
- Born: December 1892; Karališkiai, Russian Empire
- Died: 17 May 1962 (aged 69); Kaunas, Lithuanian SSR
- Resting place: Eiguliai Cemetery
- Occupation: Archeologist, writer, military officer
- Education: Kaunas War School
- Subject: Archeology, history
- Years active: 1919–1958
- Spouse: Marija Jaropolskaja-Tarasenkienė

Petras Tarasenka (born Pyotr Tarasov; December 1892 – 17 May 1962) was a Lithuanian military officer and a prominent archeologist and writer. He is known for popularizing archeology in Lithuania and was a respected scientific figure both during its independence and Soviet occupation.

== Biography ==
=== Early life ===
The date of birth of Petras Tarasenka in sources varies from 7 to 20 December, although Tarasenka himself would celebrate 19 December as his birthday. He was born into a family of Orthodox Old Believers, as the eldest son of peasants in Karališkiai, a small village in the present-day Anykščiai District Municipality. It is unknown why or when the surname changed from Tarasov to Tarasenka, although older records show that he had already possessed the surname Tarasenka as early as finishing school. His close family still retained the old surname. Tarasenka's father engaged in business within the Alanta vodka monopoly which earned the family money and could afford the children's education. In 1902 the family moved to Alanta itself. Tarasenka attended primary schools in Alanta and Anykščiai.

=== Teacher and soldier ===
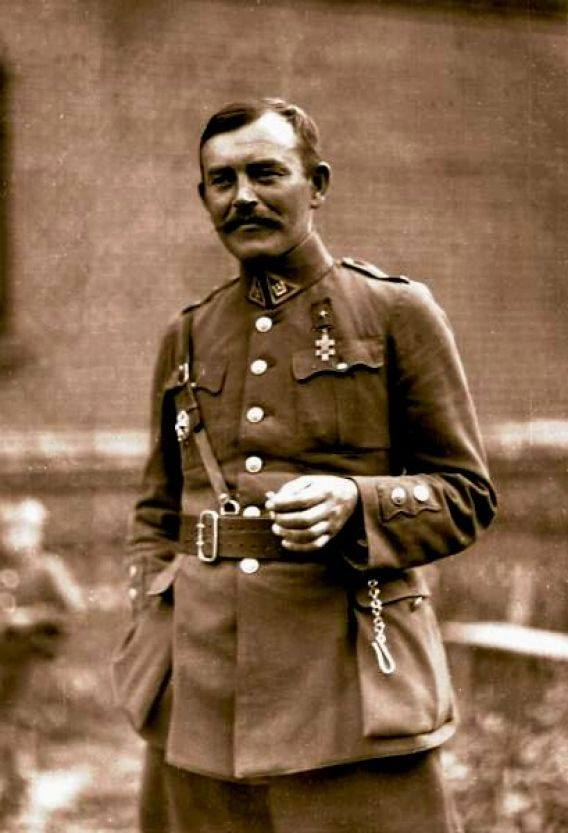
Petras Tarasenka in Klaipėda as colonel, 1924

After completing his education in Anykščiai in 1908, he entered the Panevėžys Teachers' Seminary, which he completed in 1912. He worked as a teacher in Alanta until 1913 and also in 1914 in Tirmūnai. In 1915, he was mobilized into the Russian Imperial Army due to the start of the First World War, during which he completed NCO courses in Georgia. He was demobilized in 1917 and moved to Pskov where he, besides teaching, also attended historical lectures.

Upon returning to Lithuania in 1919 he served in the interwar Lithuanian army, with whom he fought in the Lithuanian Wars of Independence. In 1922 he completed advanced officer courses and received the rank of captain, as well as getting rewarded the Cross of Vytis (1st class). After Lithuania regained the Klaipėda Region during the covert Klaipėda Revolt of 1923, a regiment was deployed in the region in which Tarasenka was an officer. He and his family then moved to Klaipėda where two of his daughters were born. Tarasenka was one of the founders of the Klaipėda Region Museum. From 1926 he was the secretary and vice-chairman of the military science board and from 1929 – one of the founders of the Lithuanian Historical Society. In 1932 Tarasenka officially retired to the army reserve.

=== Later years and death ===
From 1930 to 1934, he was a member of the National Archeology Committee. The Soviet and Nazi occupations forced him to look for work in state institutions as he also lost his military pension, and as such, from 1941 to 1944 he was head of the Archeology Department in charge of protecting monuments, as well as the director of the Kaunas War Museum from 1944 to 1946. Until his retirement in 1958, he worked at the M. K. Čiurlionis Art Museum. Tarasenka died on 17 May 1962 in Kaunas and was buried at the Eiguliai Cemetery.

== Works ==
=== Work in archeology ===
Both during his youth and during his service he was greatly interested in history and archeology. It is said that in his youth he received an encyclopedia of Lithuanian archeological monuments and was greatly impressed by it that he could almost fully recite it. From 1925 to 1936 he excavated various hillfort mounds and created various topographical plans of them. Tarasenka was the first archeologist in Lithuania to professionally use relief fixation.

=== Archeological writing ===
Tarasenka's first article is held to be written in 1921. During his service, Tarasenka often published articles that ranged from Lithuanian history to cultural monuments of the Klaipėda region. When Tarasenka had free time, he would walk along the coast in search of archeological monuments and would publish about them in the press. Tarasenka wrote textbooks on Lithuanian archaeological and historical monuments, as well as published about 100 articles about mounds, holy places, and combat.

=== Prose ===
Tarasenka also wrote prose for children, as well as much historical fiction. In the post-war years, his books Užburti Lobiai (1956), Didžiųjų Tyrulių Paaslaptys (1956), Pabėgimas (1957), Rambyno Burtininkas (1958) became particularly popular, from which knowledge about the honorable past of Lithuania was consumed by the youth of the time.
