= Vytautas Stašinskas =

Lithuanian diplomat (1906–1967)

- Born: 18 November 1906; Kaunas, Russian Empire
- Died: 15 July 1967 (aged 60); Boston, United States
- Education: War School of Kaunas; Vytautas Magnus University
- Occupations: Diplomat; Footballer
- Father: Vladas Stašinskas

Vytautas Stašinskas (18 November 1906 – 15 July 1967) was a Lithuanian diplomat and general consul in New York (1964–1967).

He was the Lithuanian chargés d'affaires ad interim to Brussels (1938–1940). In 1939, he was reassigned to the Lithuanian consulate in New York. Lithuania was occupied by the Soviet Union in June 1940, but the Lithuanian Diplomatic Service continued to function. Stašinskas was promoted to vice-consul (1941) and consul (1955). After the death of Jonas Budrys in 1964, he became the general consul. The consulate worked to provide identity documents to Lithuanian war refugees as well as assistance with locating and contacting lost relatives behind the Iron Curtain.

== Biography ==
=== Education ===
Vytautas Stašinskas was born on 18 November 1906 in Kaunas to the family of the attorney and politician Vladas Stašinskas. He graduated from the Kaunas Aušra Gymnasium in 1926. He was interested in sports and joined LFLS Kaunas and received invitations to the Lithuania national football team (was a goalkeeper). In 1924–28, Vytautas also served as the secretary of the Central Committee of the Lietuvos fizinio lavinimosi sąjunga. He played four international matches against Latvia and Estonia in 1925–1928.

In November 1930, he was drafted to serve in the Lithuanian Army. He graduated from the aspirant courses at the War School of Kaunas in October 1931 and was promoted to reserve junior lieutenant. He then joined the Ministry of Foreign Affairs. In 1934, he graduated from the Vytautas Magnus University where he studied law.

=== Diplomat ===
==== Positions ====
In 1935, Stašinskas was sent to work as a secretary at the Lithuanian legation in Brussels. He was later promoted to attaché and become chargés d'affaires ad interim when Vytautas Gylys was reassigned to represent Lithuania in Sweden. Stašinskas officially led the Lithuanian legation from 30 November 1938 to 25 February 1940.

On 15 March 1939, Stašinskas arrived to New York where he was assigned to work with the Lithuanian general consul Jonas Budrys. At the time, the consulate employed only Budrys and Anicetas Simutis who faced increased workloads due to the decision for Lithuania to participate at the 1939 New York World's Fair.

Lithuania was occupied by the Soviet Union in June 1940, but the Lithuanian Diplomatic Service continued to function as western countries continued the de jure recognition of independent Lithuania. The diplomats worked to preserve the legal state continuity. General consul Budrys spent little time at the consulate; thus Stašinskas was in charge of most of its affairs. The United States Department of State recognized Stašinskas as vice-consul on 14 May 1941.

After the death of the honorary general consul Gerald L. P. Grant-Suttie in Toronto in May 1949, Stašinskas was considered for his replacement. But since he would have to split his time between New York and Toronto, it was decided to appoint Vytautas Gylys to Toronto. Stašinskas was promoted to consul in 1955. However, due to limited financial resources of the Lithuanian Diplomatic Service, his salary was just $4,900 (equivalent to $51,909 in 2025) with no benefits. As such, he struggled financially.

General consul Budrys died on 1 September 1964 and Stašinskas was promoted to general consul (the Department of State recognized him on 1 October 1964).

==== Activities ====
The consulate in New York worked to provide identity documents, visas, and other support to Lithuanian war refugees arriving to the United States and assisted in settling inheritances. The consulate also helped Lithuanians with locating lost relatives and sending parcels, money, or letters to those left behind the Iron Curtain. It also promoted the Lithuanian cause for independence and represented Lithuania at various official events and conferences. The consulate responded to various inquiries about Lithuania, its history and culture, and monitored the press.

In addition, Stašinskas actively participated in the activities of the United Lithuanian Relief Fund of America (BALF), Assembly of Captive European Nations, and Committee for a Free Lithuania. Stašinskas was also an unofficial Lithuanian representative at the United Nations (officially, he was admitted to the proceedings as a journalist writing for the bulletin The Lithuanian Situation). This practice ceased around 1958. Stašinskas disliked large public events, but after the promotion to the general consul in 1964, he attended delivered speeches at several events organized by Lithuanian Americans. These events included the funeral of Steponas Kairys, signatory of the Act of Independence of Lithuania, and the celebration of the 100th birth anniversary of President Kazys Grinius in Philadelphia.

=== Death and funeral ===
In 1966, Stašinskas underwent a surgery. His health started deteriorating in June 1967. He took a vacation and traveled to Cape Cod. On 3 July, he was taken to Carney Hospital where he was diagnosed with an inoperable kidney tumor. He died on 15 July 1967. His short obituary was published by The New York Times. His funeral service was attended by about 400 people, including the Estonian consul Ernst Jaakson and the general secretary of the Assembly of Captive European Nations Feliks Gadomski. After a mass at Our Lady of Vilnius Church, Stašinskas was buried at the Calvary Cemetery.
