= Lithuanian Historical Society =

The Lithuanian Historical Society (Lithuanian: Lietuvos istorijos draugija) was a society of Lithuanian historians established in 1929 in Kaunas. It was the first society dedicated to history in Lithuania and was a sign of historians becoming more professional. It sought to improve historical research and historical publications, but was not very active. It published only two volumes of its journal Praeitis (The Past). It ceased activities after the Soviet occupation in June 1940. The society was reestablished during the Glasnost reforms and was active in 1988–2001.

== Interwar society ==
=== History ===
The founding meeting of the society took place on 18 May 1929 in the apartment of Augustinas Janulaitis who was the driving force of the society and its long-term chairman. Janulaitis was a member of the Lithuanian Scientific Society and attempted to establish its history section in 1920, but these efforts failed. The Lithuanian Historical Society identified four key areas of activities: organizing lectures, conferences, meetings; publishing journals, books, etc.; gathering sources on the history of Lithuania; and cooperating internationally.

The society became a member of the International Committee of Historical Sciences in 1931. Two society members (Janulaitis and Zenonas Ivinskis) participated at the 8th International Congress of Historical Sciences in Zürich in 1938. The society was also invited to contribute to the annual International Bibliography of Historical Sciences, but the response was sluggish.

The society and all of its members (except for Peliksas Bugailiškis who was from Šiauliai) were based in Kaunas. To expand its reach beyond Kaunas, it established a section for history teachers in 1938. It grew to about 60 members, but they did not become the true members of the Lithuanian Historical Society.

The society became less active after the Institute for Lithuanian Studies was founded in 1939 and took over most of the functions of the society. The society ceased activities after the Soviet occupation in June 1940. Most of the members were either arrested or deported by the Soviets, or fled from Lithuania at the end of World War II. Historians who immigrated to the United States established the Lithuanian Historical Society (Lietuvių istorijos draugija) which was active in 1956–1989.

=== Activities ===
The society organized various lectures and events. For example, it organized exhibitions for the 500th death anniversary of Grand Duke Vytautas and the 20th anniversary of the Act of Independence of Lithuania. However, the society felt that it should work on academic studies and historical facts, and did not focus on public or popular history. The society discussed various current developments and initiatives. Particularly lively discussions were held concerning one-volume book on the history of Lithuania edited by Adolfas Šapoka. The older generation of historians argued that specialized monographs on specific topics should be published first before a synthesis could be made. The younger historians did not want to wait and argued that there was a great need for such a book.

The society established academic journal Praeitis and planned to publish it twice a year, but only two volumes of 400 and 514 pages were actually published in 1930 and 1933. The journal was edited by Janulaitis and administered by Konstantinas Jablonskis. Most articles were about the Grand Duchy of Lithuania. The journal also included publications of historical sources, reviews of books and publications, bibliography, and obituaries of noted historians. In 1936, Zenonas Ivinskis and Adolfas Šapoka – historians of the younger generation – proposed to revive and modernize the journal based on the examples of German Historische Zeitschrift or Polish Kwartalnik Historyczny, however it was not accomplished.

The society also planned to publish a book series Praeities biblioteka. However, only three books were published:

- Dobužinskis, Mstislavas (1933). Vytis: Didžiosios Lietuvos Kunigaikštystės valstybinio erbo istorinių variantų bruožai: XIV–XVI amž [Vytis: Features of the Historical Variants of the State Coat of Arms of the Grand Duchy of Lithuania: 14th–16th Centuries] (in Lithuanian). Kaunas: Lietuvos istorijos draugija. OCLC 41936569.
- Šakenis, Konstantinas (1935). Vabalninkas ir jo apylinkė praeityje iki Lietuvos nepriklausomybės atgavimo [Vabalninkas and the Surrounding Area Before the Independence of Lithuania] (in Lithuanian). Kaunas: Lietuvos istorijos draugija. OCLC 79744404.
- Jablonskis, Konstantinas (1941). Lietuviški žodžiai senosios Lietuvos raštinių kalboje [Lithuanian Words in the Written Sources of the Old Lithuania] (in Lithuanian). Kaunas: Lietuvos istorijos draugija. OCLC 11784811.

Despite its lackluster activity, the society was influential in the community of Lithuanian historians.

== Reestablished society ==
Zigmantas Kiaupa, Ingė Lukšaitė, and Egidijus Aleksandravičius initiated the restoration of the society in 1988. 89 historians attended the founding meeting held on 14 October 1988. The society published academic journal Mūsų praeitis (seven volumes in 1990–2001). It paid significant attention to research conducted by the interwar and émigré historians. The society also finalized and published the third volume of Praeitis (1992) which was started by the interwar society. The publication also included biographies of all historians who had published articles in Praeitis.

The society organized six general meetings as well as various conferences and lectures. For example, it organized an international conference for the 580th anniversary of the Battle of Grunwald. Its proceedings were published in the first volume of Acta Historica Universitatis Klaipedensis published by Klaipėda University in 1993. It also organized essay contests for children and adults.

Its section for history teachers became a separate organization in 1992. The Lithuanian Historical Society became inactive in 2001. Its functions were taken over by the Committee of Lithuanian Historians established in 1996.

== Members ==
Members of the society were divided into categories: true members (professional historians), honorary members (people who made merited contribution to the study of the history of Lithuania), and supporters. Therefore, the interwar society was never large and had between 15 and 17 members. In total, there were 26 true members in the interwar period.

Augustinas Janulaitis was chairman of the society until 1940. Other board members included Ignas Jonynas (vice-chair), Vaclovas Biržiška (librarian), Petras Tarasenka and Konstantinas Avižonis (treasurers), Konstantinas Jablonskis (secretary).

Other society members included Lev Karsavin, Jonas Yčas, Jonas Totoraitis, Petras Klimas, Zenonas Ivinskis, Adolfas Šapoka, Vytautas Steponaitis, Jonas Matusas, Antanas Vasys-Vasiliauskas, Marija Mašiotaitė-Urbšienė, Vanda Daugirdaitė-Sruogienė, Paulius Galaunė, Juozas Tumas, Eduards Volters, Jonas Puzinas, Aleksandras Pliateris, Mykolas Biržiška, Vaclovas Biržiška, Michał Pius Römer, Peliksas Bugailiškis.

The reestablished society had 141 members in December 1989. Chairmen of the reestablished society were Bronius Dundulis, Antanas Tyla, Vytautas Merkys, Elmantas Meilus, Aivas Ragauskas.
