= Agronomic and Legal Aid =

Lithuanian humanitarian aid organization of World War I

The Lithuanian Committee for Agronomic and Legal Aid to the Victims of War (Lithuanian: Lietuvių draugija nukentėjusiems nuo karo gyventojams agronomijos ir teisių pagalbai teikti or simply Agronomijos ir teisių draugija) was a Lithuanian organization that provided humanitarian aid during World War I. Established in May 1915, the society was active until 1918. It wanted to operate in all of Lithuania, but was restricted to Vilnius where it maintained three shelters for children and three soup kitchens. It was a leftist response to the much larger and better funded Lithuanian Society for the Relief of War Sufferers.

== Establishment ==
As the war broke out between the Russian and German Empires on 1 August [O.S. 19 July] 1914, people living within 16 kilometres (9.9 mi) of the front line were ordered to evacuate. Ten days later, Lithuanian activists in Vilnius organized the Temporary Lithuanian Committee for the Relief of War Sufferers. In total, it had 20 members, both liberals and conservatives.

On 27 November [O.S. 14 November] 1914, the Governor of Vilnius approved the statute of the Lithuanian Society for the Relief of War Sufferers. Right-wing representatives (mainly members of the Party of National Progress and Lithuanian Christian Democratic Party) won majority of seats in the board. Leftist activists (mainly members of the Social Democratic Party of Lithuania and the future Lithuanian Popular Socialist Democratic Party), including some of the founding members of the Temporary Committee, left the Lithuanian Society for the Relief of War Sufferers in protest.

The Temporary Committee became a chapter of the Lithuanian Society for the Relief of War Sufferers on 24 January 1915. However, dissatisfied liberals were able to retain children's shelter at the Vileišis Palace run by the writer Julija Žymantienė-Žemaitė. They organized the Agronomic and Legal Aid and submitted its registration to the authorities of Vilna Governorate on 1 February [O.S. 19 January] 1915. Its founding meeting took place on 21 May 1915. The political split was widely discussed in the Lithuanian press and continued to be an issue.

== Activities ==
In its organizational documents, the society planned to provide agricultural assistance – provide seed, farm animals, tools, etc. to farmers as well as assist in organizing cooperatives. Therefore, in theory, it was not a competitor to the Lithuanian Society for the Relief of War Sufferers which provided charitable and humanitarian aid, while the Agronomic and Legal Aid would focus on improving the economic life.

In practice, it was mostly active providing aid to students and war refugees. It maintained soup kitchens in Kuršėnai and Papilė, and a shelter in Šiauliai. However, it was prohibited from operating outside of Vilnius. By May 1916, it was left with only three children's shelters in Vilnius (Užupis, Šnipiškės, and near Vingis Park) with 152 students. Due to food shortage in Vilnius, some children were moved to a shelter established in an Eastern Orthodox monastery in Surdegis. The society then opened three soup kitchens in Vilnius that provided free lunches until 1918.

The society established a separate organization to provide sanitary aid known as Sveikata (Health). It provided free medical assistance to war refugees, particularly in an attempt to prevent contagious diseases. It was approved by the Tsarist authorities on 29 April 1915 and had its founding meeting on 27 May 1915. Its first board included Andrius Domaševičius, Veronika Alseikienė, and Jonas Mašiotas.

== Funding ==
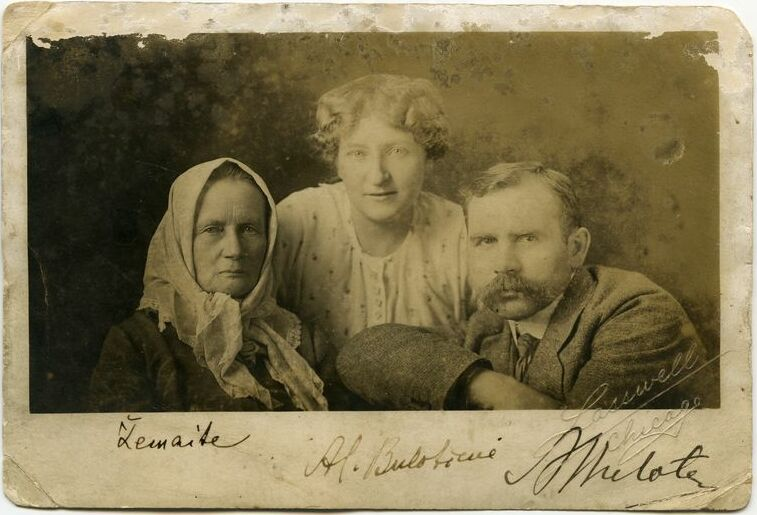
Postcard with Žemaitė, Bulotienė, and Bulota given to those who donated money for the refugee relief

The society was funded by donations and grants from the Union of Cities and other Russian organizations. It also received support from Lithuanian Americans.

In October 1914, socialists established the Lithuanian Relief Fund (Lietuvos šelpimo fondas) which collected donations for Lithuanian refugees. In 1916–1917, this fund sent about US$10,000 (equivalent to $295,872 in 2025) to the Agronomic and Legal Aid. The fund also insisted that a third of donations collected during the Lithuanian Day (1 November 1916) would be sent to the Agronomic and Legal Aid and other socialist organizations, including Žiburėlis and Grūdas Society that operated in Russia. However, due to the disagreements between Lithuanian political camps and the American entry into World War I, most of the collected funds were frozen until 1919.

Invited by the Lithuanian Relief Fund, Andrius Bulota together with his wife Aleksandra Bulotienė and writer Žemaitė travelled to the United States in 1916. From March 1916 to April 1917, they toured about a hundred cities with Lithuanian American and Lithuanian Canadian communities and raised about US$50,000 (equivalent to $1,479,358 in 2025) for the relief efforts in Lithuania.

== Relationship with the Lithuanian Society ==
The relationship between the Agronomic and Legal Aid and the Lithuanian Society for the Relief of War Sufferers was mostly adversarial, though there were efforts to find a common ground and cooperate. The main point of contention was spreading political ideology to people receiving aid. For example, Agronomic and Legal Aid was accused of indoctrinating children at its shelters with atheism.

After the German capture of Vilnius in September 1915, four members of the Agronomic and Legal Aid (Mykolas Biržiška, Augustinas Janulaitis, Steponas Kairys, and Peliksas Bugailiškis) were coopted by the Lithuanian Society for the Relief of War Sufferers. However, the societies remained separate as Andrius Domaševičius and Petras Klimas were vocal against their merger. These disagreements did not allow the Lithuanian Society for the Relief of War Sufferers to become the political center that could represent Lithuanian interests. Nevertheless, some leftist activists joined the other society. For example, after his retreat to Russia, Mykolas Sleževičius joined the Lithuanian Society for the Relief of War Sufferers becoming its representative to southern Russia.

In another attempt to coordinate the efforts, both societies established a joint Education Commission in December 1915. It discussed issues of a Lithuanian curriculum and financing the Lithuanian schools. Some members of the Agronomic and Legal Aid opposed the joint Lithuanian commission due to the intended role of the clergy-dominated Lithuanian Education Society Rytas and instead wanted to work with Polish or Jewish groups. Both societies agreed to open an information bureau to help jobseekers, but it was established only in 1918.

== Leadership ==
The founding meeting on 3 June [O.S. 21 May] 1915 was attended by more than 40 people. The official founders of the society were: Jonas Vileišis, Steponas Kairys, Augustinas Janulaitis, Viktoras Ruokis, and Jurgis Čiurlys.

The first board members were: chairman Jonas Vileišis, vice-chairman Jonas Kriščiūnas, secretary Jurgis Šaulys, treasurer Peliksas Bugailiškis, deputy treasurer Mykolas Biržiška, members Felicija Bortkevičienė, Augustinas Janulaitis, Mykolas Januškevičius, Viktoras Ruokis, Mykolas Sleževičius. It also included Polish representative Aleksander Meysztowicz and Jewish representative Naphtali Friedman. Non-Lithuanian members of the society included Aleksander Zasztowt, Anton Luckievich, Dominik Semashko, Vladimir Zubov, and others. Due to the presence of non-Lithuanian members, conservative newspapers Viltis and Vairas labeled the society as a Lithuanian–Polish–Jewish–Atheist–Endek alliance.

When Vilnius was occupied by Germany during the Great Retreat, new board members Steponas Kairys (became vice-chairman), Petras Klimas, Vladas Stašinskas, Juozas Paknys, and Bronius Žilinskas replaced Kriščiūnas, Bortkevičienė, Januškevičius, Ruokis, and Sleževičius.

After the February Revolution, there were tensions among the leftist activists. In April–May 1917, Petras Klimas and other more moderate members withdrew from the Agronomic and Legal Aid leaving Andrius Domaševičius in charge. In May 1917, he signed a protest letter on the food shortages to the Chancellor of Germany in the name of the Agronomic and Legal Aid.

== Bibliography ==
- Aničas, Jonas (1995). Jonas Vileišis 1872–1942 (in Lithuanian). Vilnius: Alma littera. ISBN 9986-02-097-2.
- Biržiška, Vaclovas, ed. (1954). "Bulota, Andrius". Lietuvių enciklopedija (in Lithuanian). Vol. III. Boston: Lietuvių enciklopedijos leidykla. pp. 347–348.
- Čepėnas, Pranas (1986). Naujųjų laikų Lietuvos istorija. Vol. II. Chicago: Dr. Kazio Griniaus Fondas. OCLC 3220435.
- Gaigalaitė, Aldona (20 May 2019) [2001]. "Agronomijos ir teisių draugija". Visuotinė lietuvių enciklopedija (in Lithuanian). Mokslo ir enciklopedijų leidybos centras.
- Girnius, Juozas, ed. (1958). "Lietuvių Draugija Nukentėjusiems Nuo Karo Gyventojams Agronomijos Ir Teisių Pagalbai Teikti". Lietuvių enciklopedija (in Lithuanian). Vol. 16. Juozas Kapočius. p. 38.
- Griffante, Andrea (2015a). "Making the Nation: Refugees, Indigent People, and Lithuanian Relief, 1914–1920". In Balkelis, Tomas; Davoliūtė, Violeta (eds.). Population Displacement in Lithuania in the Twentieth Century: Experiences, Identities and Legacies. Vilnius Academy of Arts Press. ISBN 978-609-447-181-0.
- Griffante, Andrea (2015b). "Displacement and Education: Some Observations on the Situation in Ober Ost, between 1914 and 1918". Acta Historica Universitatis Klaipedensis. 31: 185–200. doi:10.15181/ahuk.v31i0.1206.
- Griffante, Andrea (2017). "On the Battlefield of Hygiene: The Lithuanian Medical Intelligentsia, 1914–1920". Acta Historica Universitatis Klaipedensis. 34. doi:10.15181/ahuk.v34i0.1612.
- Lopata, Raimundas (1996). "Lietuvos valstybingumo raida 1914–1918 metais" (PDF). Lietuvių atgimimo istorijos studijos (in Lithuanian). 9. ISSN 1392-0391.
- Liulevičius, Vincentas (1981). Išeivijos vaidmuo nepriklausomos Lietuvos atkūrimo darbe (in Lithuanian). Chicago: Lithuanian World Community. OCLC 10779045.
- Merkelis, Aleksandras (1964). Antanas Smetona: jo visuomeninė, kultūrinė ir politinė veikla (in Lithuanian). New York: Amerikos lietuvių tautinė sąjunga. OCLC 494741879.
- Mitrulevičius, Gintaras (2002). "Socialdemokratų politinės nuostatos bei veikla Lietuvoje Vokietijos okupacijos metu: 1915 m. ruduo – 1917 m. pirmoji pusė". Lietuvos istorijos metraštis (in Lithuanian). 2: 121–146. ISSN 2538-6549.
- "Mūsų kultūros gyvenimas". Mūsų kalendorius 1917 metams (in Lithuanian). Vilnius: Žinynas. 1916.
- Sperskienė, Rasa (2018). "Lietuvos visuomenė Pirmojo pasaulinio karo pradžioje". Lietuvos mokslų akademijos Vrublevskių biblioteka (in Lithuanian). 2013–2014: 125–136. ISSN 1648-9772.
- Tamošaitis, Mindaugas (2020). "Mykolo Sleževičiaus politinė veikla Pirmojo pasaulinio karo metais". Parlamento studijos (in Lithuanian). 28: 72–114. ISSN 1822-749X.
