= Paulina Mongird =

Lithuanian photographer (1865–1924)

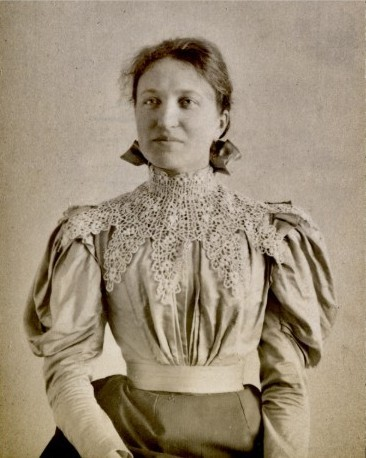
- Portrait of Mongird, c. 1903
- Born: 3 February 1864; Raseiniai uezd, Kovno Governorate, Russian Empire
- Died: 5 November 1924 (aged 60); Palanga, Republic of Lithuania
- Resting place: Palanga
- Years active: 1888-1924
- Era: Modern
- Parents: Mieczysław Mongird (father); Zofia née Hryszkiewicz (mother)
- Family: Wadwicz

Paulina Mongird (Lithuanian: Paulina Mongirdaitė; February 3, 1864 – November 5, 1924) was the first professional female photographer in Lithuania.

== Early life ==
Mongird was born in 1864 into a szlachta family in Raseiniai County, then part of the Kovno Governorate in the Russian Empire. Her parents were Mieczysław and Zofia Mongird (née Hryszkiewicz). She had a brother Jan (1858-unknown) and sister, Zofia (1860-1912).

Around 1885, the Mongird family moved to Palanga in the Courland Governorate after selling their estate. They acquired property on Memel Street 7 (now Vytautas Street), which included the Tuchanovicz villa.

Mongird was well-educated, graduating from Henryka Czarnocka’s Private Girls' Boarding School in Warsaw between 1880 and 1886. She spoke Lithuanian and Polish fluently, had proficiency in Russian and French, and was talented in drawing. Her interest in photography led her to take a few classes in Warsaw, after which she developed her expertise independently through practical work and experience.

== Career ==
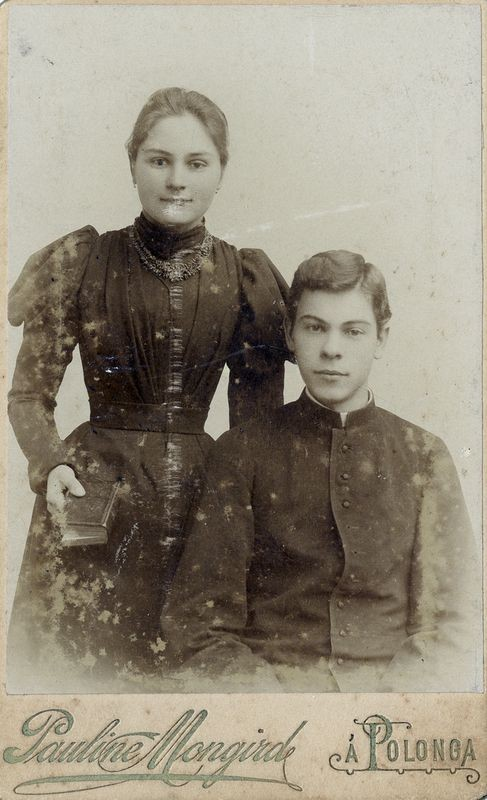
Father Felicijonas Juškevičius with his sister, 1888

Mongird began her photographic career around 1888, using equipment she acquired from Warsaw. In 1892, she opened a photography studio in Palanga after receiving official permission from the general governor. Her studio operated until her death in 1924. Her early works bore labels such as "Fotografia P. Mongird Polangen" (in Cyrillic) or "Wadwicz Mongird Polangen" (in Polish).

Mongird was the first professional photographer to capture the architecture, landscapes, and daily activities in the towns of Palanga, Kretinga, and Gargždai. Her portraits often featured meticulously composed backdrops, such as seascapes, and were popular with visitors to Palanga.Her portraits became especially popular among tourists seeking to preserve memories of their visits.

She documented Palanga’s landscapes, the Baltic coastline, and local life. Her work was sold to tourists and published in newspapers. In addition to her work in Palanga, she produced postcards featuring scenes from Kretinga and the Russian-German border.

== Notable works ==
Mongird's photographic works include:

- The photo album "Kretinga" (1890), featuring 49 photographs preserved in the Wroblewski Library of the Lithuanian Academy of Sciences.
- "M. Pauline. Polonga Bains de mer" [Palanga Sea Baths], c. 1892, a lithographic album.
- "Polonga. Atelier de Pauline Mongird" [Palanga. Paulina Mongird’s Studio], pre-1916, held in the National Library of Poland.

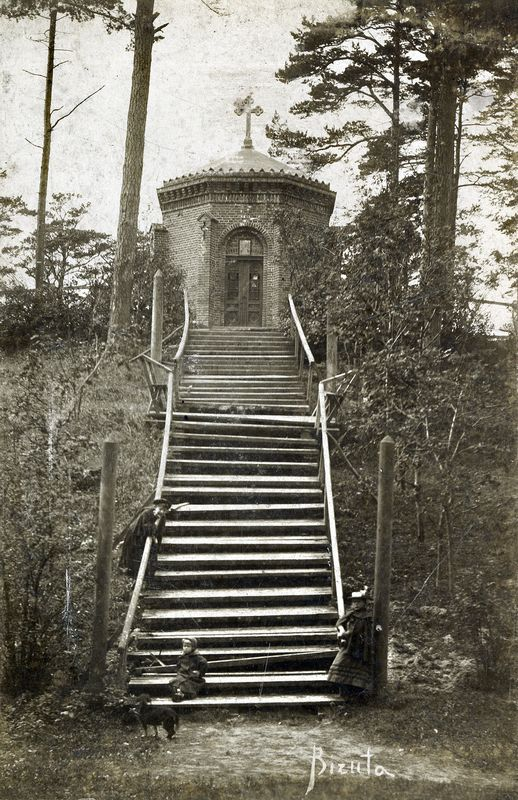
Birutė Hill, Palanga, late 19th c.

Her photographs were frequently reproduced in promotional publications about Palanga, as well as in Lithuanian and Polish newspapers and albums published abroad. Between 1899 and 1924, Mongird created postcards depicting notable sites, such as manors in Palanga, Kretinga, and Vaitkuškis, along with portraits of Lithuanian grand dukes. Her early postcards were lithographed, while later ones combined photographic and graphic elements.

Her talents were recognized by the Tyszkiewicz counts, prominent patrons who invited her to photograph family members and commissioned her to create albums documenting the manor estates in Palanga and Kretinga.

In 1911, she won a silver medal at a photography exhibition in Lviv.

One of her works, "Birutė Hill in Palanga", is preserved in the Historical Collections of Vilnius University Library and included in UNESCO’s Memory of the World project.

== Selected exhibitions and documentaries ==
=== Exhibitions ===
- 2012, Poland, Sopot: Photographs by Paulina Mongird were featured in the exhibition "The Tyszkiewicz Palanga: A Baltic Resort at the Turn of the 19th and 20th Century" at the Sopot Museum.
- 2020, Lithuania, Vilnius: Virtual Exhibitions: "Paulina Mongirdaitė. Photography Exhibition" by Martynas Mažvydas National Library of Lithuania.
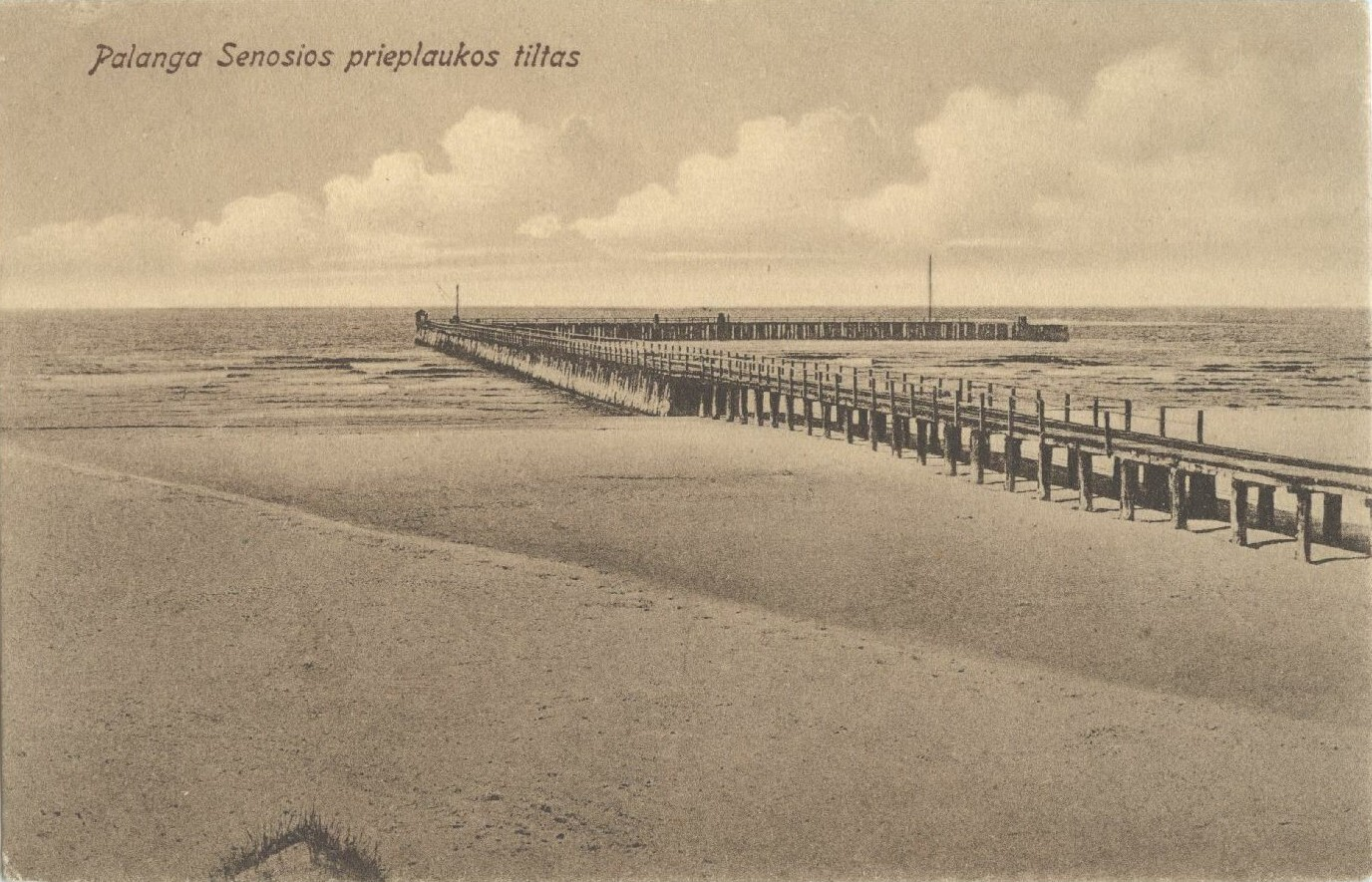
- Palanga old pier, 1922
  2024, Lithuania, Palanga: Exhibition "A Woman with a Camera at the Turn of the 19th and 20th Century".
- 2024, Lithuania, Palanga: Exhibition "In Focus: The Tyszkiewicz Counts' Palanga, Paulina Mongirdaitė, 19th–20th Century Photography".

=== Documentaries ===
- 2017, Lithuania: A documentary „Vyrų šešėlyje [In the Shadow of Men]. Paulina Mongirdaitė" (Director Justinas Lingys) was aired, highlighting her contributions to photography.
- 2020, Lithuania: Documentary from the series "Forgotten Names in Photography" (Director Justinas Lingys) featured Paulina Mongirdaitė and Ignas Stropus, drawing renewed attention to their works.

== Personal life and legacy ==
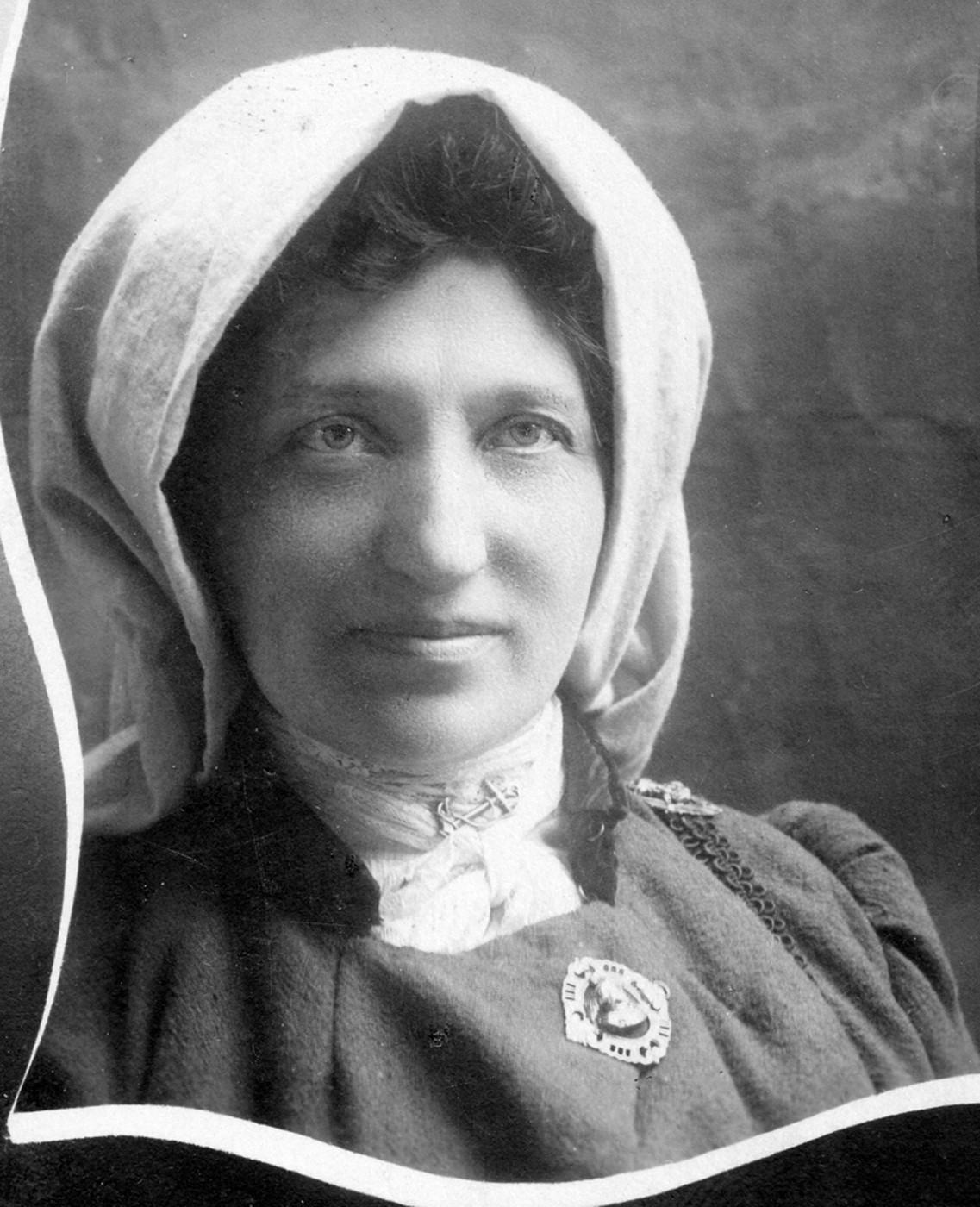
Mongird's self-portrait, early 20th c.

Mongird never married and supported her family, including her mother, sister, and two nieces, while living in Palanga. Her niece Janina Wrotnowska (née Walicka) described Mongird’s life in her memoirs, excerpts of which appear in The First Photographers of the Coast: Paulina Mongirdaitė and Ignas Stropus by Jolanta Klietkutė. Another niece, Nora Bucewicz (née Walicka), was a writer who incorporated Mongird's photographs into her publications.

Paulina Mongird died on November 5, 1924, and was buried in Palanga’s old cemetery near the chapel. Her grave is no longer identifiable.

Photographer and writer Jolanta Klietkutė has played a key role in reviving Mongird’s legacy through her research and publications.
