= Juozas Paknys =

Lithuanian politician and banker (1883–1948)

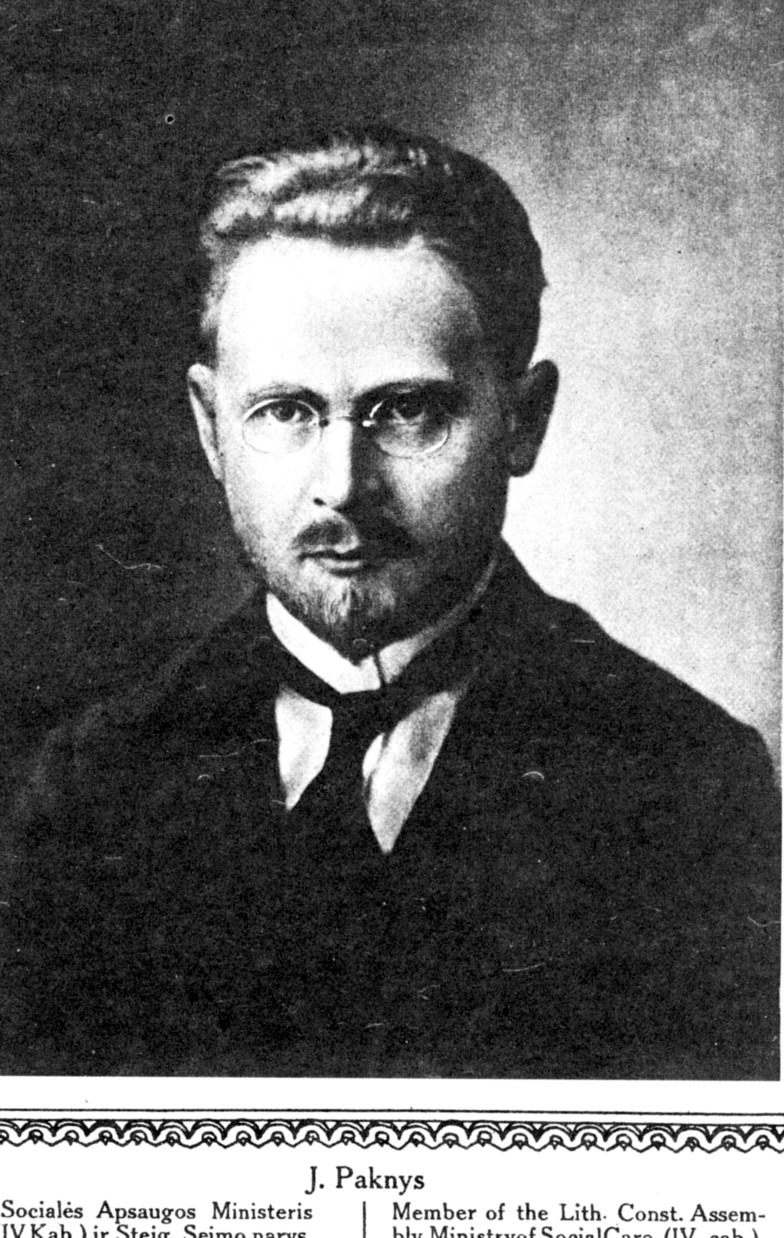
- Paknys in Lietuvos albumas

Minister of Provision and Public Work
- In office 26 December 1918 – 13 March 1919
- Prime Minister: Mykolas Sleževičius
- Preceded by: Vladas Stašinskas
- Succeeded by: Aleksandras Stulginskis

Minister of Labor and Social Security
- In office 12 April 1919 – 7 October 1919
- Prime Minister: Mykolas Sleževičius

Personal details
- Born: 23 September 1883 Pakniškės, Russian Empire
- Died: 3 January 1948 (aged 64) Reutlingen, French occupation zone in Germany
- Party: Social Democratic Party of Lithuania
- Relatives: Antanas Paknys (brother)
- Occupation: Politician, banker
- Awards: Order of the Lithuanian Grand Duke Gediminas (1928)

Juozas Paknys (23 September 1883 – 3 January 1948) was a Lithuanian banker who was the governor of the Bank of Lithuania in 1939–1940 and 1941–1942.

Paknys joined the Social Democratic Party of Lithuania while still a gymnasium student. He actively participated in the Russian Revolution of 1905 and was sentenced to a year in prison. Released, he studied commerce in Saint Petersburg and later found employment at a commercial bank in Kaunas. During World War I, he continued to be active with the Social Democratic Party and organized aid to war refugees in Vilnius. He joined two cabinets of prime minister Mykolas Sleževičius as minister of provisions and public work (December 1918 – March 1919) and minister of labor and social security (April–October 1919). He was also the vice-minister of finance and industry (February–October 1922).

In October 1922, Paknys was invited to work at the newly established Bank of Lithuania. He was promoted to ban assistant governor in 1926 and appointed governor in October 1939. However, historians consider Paknys as the de facto leader of the bank since the resignation of the first governor Vladas Jurgutis in 1929. The Bank of Lithuania introduced the Lithuanian litas in October 1922 and worked to keep it stable during the Great Depression. As governor, Paknys had to deal with financial difficulties brought by the start of World War II, including the incorporation of Vilnius Region and high inflation.

Paknys was dismissed from the bank after the Soviet occupation in June 1940. He then worked as a deputy people's commissar of finance until the German invasion in June 1941. Paknys joined the short-lived Provisional Government of Lithuania as the vice-minister of finance. Paknys returned to the Bank of Lithuania in October 1941, but it operated as a commercial bank and was threatened with closure by the German administration. He was dismissed from the bank in October 1942. He the joined the anti-Nazi resistance becoming a member of the Supreme Committee for the Liberation of Lithuania (VLIK). In 1944, he evacuated to Germany where he joined the Lithuanian Red Cross and organized aid to Lithuanian refugees. He died in 1948 in Reutlingen.

== Biography ==
=== Early life and education ===
Paknys was born on 23 September [O.S. 10 September] 1883 in the khutor (single-homestead settlement) of Pakniškės near Jūžintai in the present-day northern Lithuania (then part of the Russian Empire). His parents owned about 50 hectares (120 acres) of land. He was the first-born son from the total of 12 children. His brother Antanas Paknys became an aviator and constructor of gliders.

Paknys attended Mitau Gymnasium and became active in the Lithuanian cultural life. He was a member of the Kūdikis Society which promoted the ideas of the Lithuanian National Revival and distributed the banned Lithuanian publications. In 1903, together with Vladas Požela, Paknys founded a socialist group of farm workers and peasants (Lauko darbininkų, bežemių ir mažažemių organizacija). They believed that the Social Democratic Party of Lithuania was too focused on cities and neglected rural communities. In spring 1904, this organization was renamed to Draugas (Friend) and published five proclamations.

=== Social democratic activist ===
After graduation in 1904, Paknys moved to Kaunas where he organized groups of workers and taught them the basic principles of Marxism. In fall 1904, he enrolled at the Kaunas Priest Seminary – an unexpected decision by a person who clearly supported socialism. It is explained as either the desire to avoid conscription during the Russo-Japanese War or as a desire to appease his parents who wanted him to become a priest. However, he dropped out after about a year.

Paknys was an active participant in the Russian Revolution of 1905. He organized protests, demonstrations, and worker strikes, particularly among manor workers near Joniškis. On 17 July 1905, Paknys and Požela organized a demonstration in Joniškis that attracted 3,000 people. It was forcibly dispersed by the Tsarist police which fired at the crowd. Three people were killed and up to 14 injured, including Požela.

On 14 December 1905, with others, Paknys disarmed Tsarist officials and shut down a local producer of alcohol in Žeimiai. On the way back to Kaunas, he was arrested. Initially, he was tried as a criminal but later the case was reclassified as political. Paknys was sentenced to one year in prison which he served in Kaunas Prison. He was released in late 1907.

In 1908, Paknys enrolled at the Commercial Institute in Saint Petersburg (most likely the Higher Commercial Courses of M. V. Pobedinski which became the predecessor of the Saint Petersburg State University of Engineering and Economics). He continued to be involved with Lithuanian and socialist activities. Together with Mykolas Biržiška and Steponas Kairys, he founded the socialist magazine Visuomenė and also contributed articles to Darbo balsas. In 1912, he was elected as a candidate to the central committee of the Social Democratic Party of Lithuania.

Paknys graduated in 1912 and moved to Kaunas where he found employment at a commercial bank. During World War I, he moved to Vilnius where he continued to be active in the Social Democratic Party and was elected to its central committee. He contributed numerous articles to social democratic press and administered the party's newspaper Darbo balsas. He became a board member of the Lithuanian Society for Agronomy and Legal Assistance (socialist response to the Lithuanian Society for the Relief of War Sufferers) which provided aid, primarily free food, to war refugees.

=== Government of Lithuania ===
In September 1917, Paknys attended Vilnius Conference and was elected to its secretariat. He was a candidate to the Council of Lithuania, but received 54 votes for and 143 against. At the start of the Lithuanian–Soviet War, Paknys retreated to Kaunas and did not join the Lithuanian Soviet Socialist Republic by his former party member Vincas Kapsukas.

On 26 December 1918, Paknys joined the cabinet of Mykolas Sleževičius as the minister of provision and public work. However, this government resigned due to conflicts with the Council of Lithuania. It was replaced by the short-lived and ineffective cabinet of Pranas Dovydaitis in March 1919. To solve the government crisis, Paknys and others worked on a constitutional amendment which effectively replaced the Council of Lithuania with the President of Lithuania. In April 1919, Sleževičius agreed to form a new government and Paknys returned as the minister of labor and social security. In the government, Paknys organized a public employment service and the Departments of Labor Inspection and Social Security. He also worked on organizing the return of Lithuanian war refugees.

When Sleževičius cabinet resigned on 7 October 1919, Paknys worked at the State Control Office and was vice-minister of finance and industry (February–October 1922). He unsuccessfully ran in the April 1920 election to the Constituent Assembly of Lithuania. In 1921–1922, he was an editor of the magazine Lietuvos ūkis published by the Ministry of Finance.

=== Bank of Lithuania ===
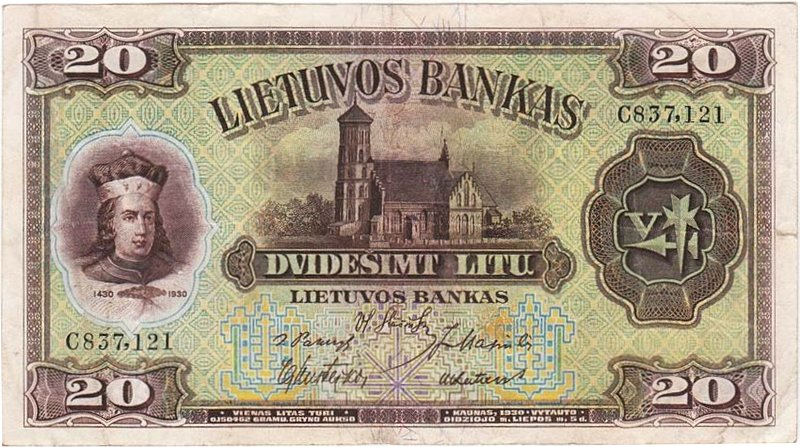
20 Lithuanian litas banknote from 1930 with signature of Paknys

In October 1922, Paknys was invited to the newly established Bank of Lithuania. In 1926, he was promoted to the assistant governor. The first governor Vladas Jurgutis resigned in 1929 and historians consider the subsequent governors Vladas Stašinskas and Juozas Tūbelis as nominal leaders who viewed the position as a sinecure while the bank was actually run and managed by Paknys. He became the governor on 25 October 1939 after the death of Tūbelis. This delay in official recognition is variously explained. His contemporaries described Paknys as a hardworking, diligent, and highly competent but also as a reticent and modest person, while Stašinskas and Tūbelis were personal friends of president Antanas Smetona. Additionally, Paknys' past as an active socialist and revolutionary might have seen as unacceptable to the ruling Lithuanian Nationalist Union.

In 1924, Paknys negotiated with the United Kingdom regarding a loan for the expansion of the Lithuanian railway to the newly acquired Klaipėda Region. From October 1929 (resignation of Jurgutis) to June 1930 (appointment of Stašinskas), Paknys was the acting governor. During this period, the government replaced experienced members of the bank's board with people who had no banking experience. Additionally, several bank employees were tried for defrauding the bank of 0.2 million litas by forging documents. During this period, Paknys revised what should be backed by the gold reserves (he included funds in treasury current accounts and half of circulating silver coins) and revised the official exchange rate of the litas to the U.S. dollar.

In summer 1931, Lithuania started feeling the effects of the Great Depression. The Bank of Lithuania worked to prevent bank failures caused by bank runs, manage decreasing gold and foreign currency reserves, and resisted calls to devalue the litas.

When Paknys became bank's governor in October 1939, Lithuania was experiencing another crisis. Between March 1939 (the German ultimatum to Lithuania) and September 1939 (the Invasion of Poland), Lithuanian banks lost 42% of deposits and looked to the Bank of Lithuania to provide liquidity. Additionally, after a portion of Vilnius Region was attached to Lithuania according to the Soviet–Lithuanian Mutual Assistance Treaty, the bank exchanged worthless Polish złoty to Lithuanian litas which was a highly contentious issue, organized new branches in the region (Vilnius, Trakai, and Švenčionėliai), and closed Polish banks. Lithuania started experiencing high inflation (the general price index rose from 52 in October 1939 to 762 on April 1940), and the bank considered measures to restrict borrowing but refused to raise the interest rates.

=== Soviet occupation ===
Lithuania was occupied by the Soviet Union on 15 June 1940. The Council of People's Commissars dismissed Paknys from the bank on 17 September 1940. According to the memoirs of Juozas Vaišnoras, the people's commissar of finance, Paknys was dismissed because he refused to surrender Lithuanian gold reserves to the State Bank of the Soviet Union (Gosbank). However, this version is contradicted by the timeline – the People's Government of Lithuania adopted the decision to transfer the gold on 12 July and the Swedish Sveriges Riksbank transferred the main reserves on 22 July 1940 (other banks delayed or refused).

However, even before his resignation, Paknys was removed from real power. The Soviets sent Dzidas Budrys, as a representative of the State Control Office, in mid-July and representatives from the Gosbank at the end of July to supervise the bank. Without their approval, Paknys and other Lithuanian employees could conduct only de minimis transactions. Under Soviet control, the Bank of Lithuania became a tool for implementing nationalization of private property (e.g. companies were mandated to deposit their cash, while investors were ordered to deposit their stock certificates).

After his resignation from the bank, Paknys worked as an advisor and later deputy people's commissar of finance (people's commissar Vaišnoras was an old acquaintance of Paknys) until the German invasion in June 1941. The Soviet representative Vladimir Dekanozov objected to this role, but it was approved by the Soviet people's commissar of finance Arseny Zverev ostensibly because of Paknys' knowledge and technical abilities. Paknys worked on nationalizing banks and private enterprises, and drafting the state budget for 1941.

Paknys and government's secretary Vincas Mašalaitis were investigated by the Soviets regarding the payment of U.S. dollars to president Antanas Smetona on the day he fled from Lithuania to avoid the Soviet occupation. However, the Lithuanian interrogator Matas Krygeris was able to close the case.

=== German occupation ===
When Germany invaded the Soviet Union in June 1941, Lithuanians organized the anti-Soviet June Uprising and formed the Provisional Government of Lithuania in hopes of reestablishing independent Lithuania. Paknys became vice-minister of finance in this provisional government. However, the government was short-lived and dissolved in early August 1941.

On 29 October 1941, Paknys again became the governor of the Bank of Lithuania. Despite the difficult wartime conditions, the bank was able to expand its operations. The bank operated as a commercial bank and not as a central bank. In mid-1942, the Germans planned on closing the bank, but Paknys and Jonas Matulionis (the general counselor for finance) vigorously protested and Theodor Adrian von Renteln agreed to keep the bank open in September 1942. However, Paknys was dismissed form the bank a month later on 12 October 1942. Bank's operations were increasingly limited until it was forbidden to take deposits or make new loans in February 1943.

=== Later life ===
After leaving the Bank of Lithuania, Paknys joined the anti-Nazi resistance. He worked on co-founding and raising funds for the Supreme Committee for the Liberation of Lithuania (VLIK). In summer 1944, Paknys retreated to Germany ahead of the advancing Red Army. He continued to be involved with VLIK and was elected to the central committee of the Social Democratic Party of Lithuania.

In June 1945, Paknys was also elected to the board of the Lithuanian Red Cross and became its treasurer. The Red Cross organized aid to Lithuanian war refugees, but it was not recognized by the United Nations Relief and Rehabilitation Administration (UNRRA) or the administration of the American occupation zone in Germany. Therefore, the Lithuanian Red Cross and Paknys moved from Würzburg in the American zone to Tübingen and later Reutlingen in the French occupation zone in Germany where conditions were somewhat better. The Lithuanian Red Cross relied on donations to fund its activities. Its annual budget reached 4.5 million marks.

Paknys died on 3 January and was buried on 7 January 1948 in Reutlingen.

== Awards ==
Paknys received the following awards:

- Order of the Lithuanian Grand Duke Gediminas (3rd degree, 1928)
- Independence Medal (1928)
- Order of Vytautas the Great (3rd degree)

== Bibliography ==
- Anušauskas, Arvydas; et al., eds. (2005). Lietuva, 1940–1990 (in Lithuanian). Vilnius: Lietuvos gyventojų genocido ir rezistencijos tyrimo centras. ISBN 9986-757-65-7.
- Bartusevičius, Vincas (2012). Lietuviai DP stovyklose Vokietijoje, 1945–1951 (in Lithuanian). Versus aureus. ISBN 978-9955-34-375-2.
- Čepėnas, Pranas (1977). Naujųjų laikų Lietuvos istorija. Vol. I. Chicago: Dr. Kazio Griniaus Fondas. OCLC 3220435.
- Gryva, Laimonas (2005). "TSRS bandymai perimti Lietuvos banko auksą ir sąskaitas užsienyje 1940–1941 metais" (PDF). Pinigų studijos (in Lithuanian). 2: 58–74. ISSN 1648-8970.
- K. B. (22 January 1948). "Juozas Paknys" (PDF). Lietuvių žodis (in Lithuanian). Vol. 4, no. 68.
- "Į Steigiamąjį Seimą. III Raseinių apygardos rinkimų sąrašai". Lietuva (in Lithuanian). Vol. 77, no. 359. 8 March 1920. pp. 1–2.
- Maksimaitis, Mindaugas (2011). Mažoji konstituanta: Lietuvos taryba atkuriant valstybingumą (in Lithuanian). Justitia. ISBN 978-9955-616-65-8.
- Petreikis, Tomas (2021). "Socialdemokratinių organizacijų pogrindinė spauda Šiauliuose 1904–1914 metais". Knygotyra (in Lithuanian). 77: 236–276. doi:10.15388/Knygotyra.2021.77.94. ISSN 2345-0053.
- Tamošaitis, Mindaugas (2016). "Paknys Juozas" (PDF). In Tamošaitis, Mindaugas; Bitautas, Algis; Svarauskas, Artūras (eds.). Lietuvos Respublikos 1918–1940 m. vyriausybių ministrų biografinis žodynas (in Lithuanian). Vilnius: Mokslo ir enciklopedijų leidybos centras. ISBN 978-5-420-01778-4.
- Terleckas, Vladas (1997). Lietuvos bankas 1922–1943 metais: kūrimo ir veiklos studija (PDF) (in Lithuanian). Vilnius: Lietuvos bankas. ISBN 978-609-8204-04-9.
- Terleckas, Vladas (2001). Lietuvos bankininkai: gyvenimų ir darbų pėdsakai (in Lithuanian). Vilnius: Lietuvos bankas. ISBN 9986651271.
- Tyla, Antanas (1968). 1905 metų revoliucija Lietuvos kaime (in Lithuanian). Vilnius: Mintis. OCLC 574184.
- Veilentienė, Audronė (2015). "Valdemaras Vytautas Čarneckis: tarp diplomatijos ir politikos". Istorija (in Lithuanian). 100: 17–69. doi:10.15823/istorija.2015.20. ISSN 1392-0456.
