= Wadwicz coat of arms =

Polish coat of arms

Wadwicz
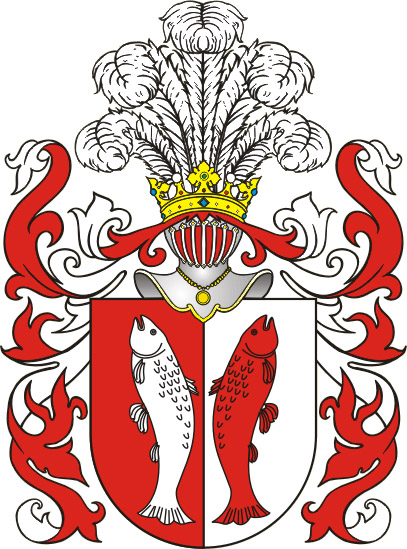
- Alternative name: Wadwic
- Earliest mention: 1404
- Families: Adamkiewicz, Adamkowicz, Ancewicz, Anglicki, Borejsza, Boski, Łodziata, Łojba, Matyaszewicz, Mężyk, Mondigird, Mondigirdowicz, Mondygiert, Mongird, Monkierski, Montygerd, Montygerdowicz, Montygierd, Nadarzyński, Naruszewicz, Okuszkowicz, Roska, Roski, Roszkiewicz, Stankiewicz, Stankowski, Stańkowski, Stańczyk, Stanczyk, Wadwicz, Wandałowicz, Węcławowicz, Węcławski, Węsławowicz, Węsławski, Wirułowicz, Wołczek

Wadwicz is a Polish coat of arms. It was used by several szlachta families in the times of the Polish–Lithuanian Commonwealth.

== History ==
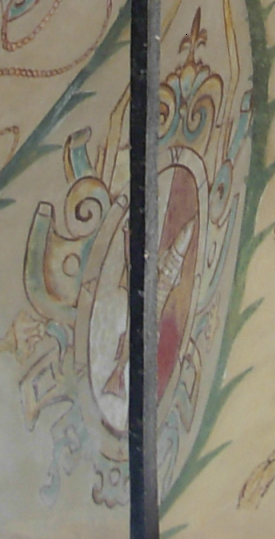
Wawdicz coat of arms in Baranow-Sandomierski castle

A knight called Wadwicz was dispatched twice in a delegation by King Boleslaw Krywousty or "Wrymouth," 1102-1138. While returning the second time this knight was plunged into the depths during a storm at sea, and he drowned. In reward for his services King Boleslaw bestowed this shield upon his successors.

== Notable bearers ==
Notable bearers of this coat of arms include:

- Jan Mężyk z Dąbrowy
- Pietrasz Montygerdowicz
- Adam Naruszewicz

== See also ==
- Polish heraldry
- Heraldry
- Coat of arms
