= Elena Janulaitienė =

Lithuanian painter (1893–1982)

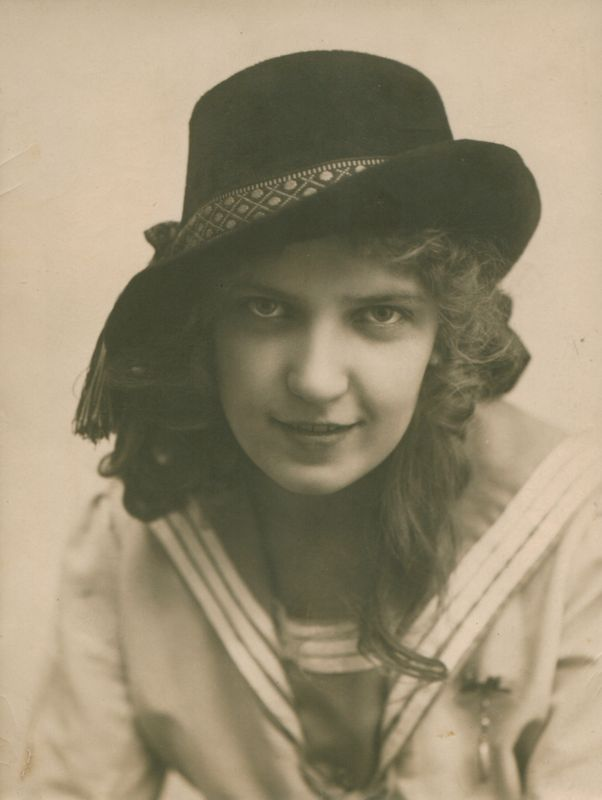
- Janulaitienė in c. 1916
- Born: Elena Jurašaitytė; 20 February 1893; Bielsk Podlaski(?), Russian Empire
- Died: 14 December 1982 (aged 89); Kaunas, Lithuanian SSR
- Occupation: Painter
- Spouse: Augustinas Janulaitis
- Parent: Aleksandras Jurašaitis
- Relatives: Sister Aleksandra Vailokaitienė

Elena Janulaitienė née Jurašaitytė (1893–1950) was a Lithuanian portrait painter.

== Biography ==
Janulaitienė was born on 20 February 1893 likely in Bielsk Podlaski. She studied at an art school in Vilnius where her teacher was the painter Adomas Varnas. She also worked at her father's photo studio and assisted in retouching the photos. During World War I, she joined the Lithuanian Society for the Relief of War Sufferers and worked as an arts teacher at its primary school.

In 1919, she moved to Kaunas. In September 1937, her works were included in an exhibition of women's press and literature organized for the Second Congress of Lithuanian Women. Janulaitienė participated in the first exhibition of Lithuanian women painters with six portraits (opened in October 1937). Her portrait of Danutė Railienė was purchased by the First Lady Sofija Smetonienė. Janulaitienė was one of the co-founders of the Society of Lithuanian Women Artists (established February 1938). She was elected secretary and vice-chair of the society. She helped organize the first exhibition of the society in January 1940.

During World War II, together with Julija Biliūnienė, Veronika Alseikienė, Sofija Čiurlionienė, and Elena Žalinkevičaitė-Petrauskienė, she helped hide two Jews.

== Works ==
Her paintings were mostly realist portraits in pastel, coal, pencils. She created portraits of several famous people of Lithuania, including Vincas Krėvė, Konstantinas Glinskis, Józef Albin Herbaczewski (all in 1926), Jonas Jablonskis, Sofija Kymantaitė-Čiurlionienė (both in 1927), Maironis (1930). Nine of her works were printed as covers of Motina ir vaikas magazine in 1930.

== Family ==
Janulaitienė was a daughter photographer Aleksandras Jurašaitis. Her sister Aleksandra Vailokaitienė was a photographer and the wife of Jonas Vailokaitis, banker and signatory of the Act of Independence of Lithuania. In 1916, Janulaitienė married Augustinas Janulaitis (1878–1950), attorney, judge, and university professor. They had one son Kęstutis (born 1934).
