= Rapolas Okulič-Kazarinas =

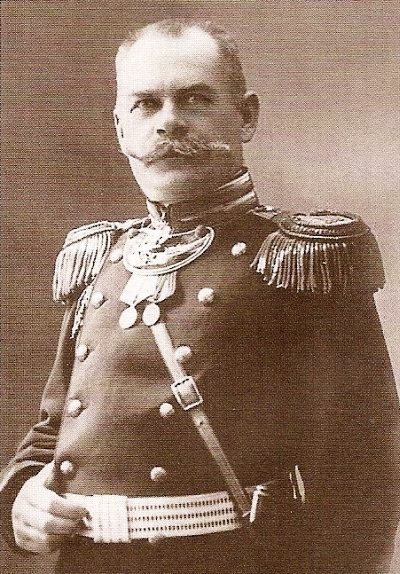
Okulič-Kazarinas c. 1910

Rapolas Okulič-Kazarinas (Okulič-Kozarinas) (Russian: Рафаил Осипович Окулич-Казарин, romanized: Rafail Osipovich Okulich-Kazarin) (24 October 1857 – 27 April 1919) was a Major general, a volunteer of the Lithuanian Army, one of the pioneers of the Lithuanian military aviation. Buried in the Cemetery of Eiguliai of Kaunas.

== Biography ==
In 1873 Okulič-Kazarinas began military service in the third infantry regiment of the Imperial Russian Army's 28th Infantry Division. Soon he was sent to be educated in the infantry junkers school in Riga for two years. After finishing it in 1875, he returned to his regiment. In 1878 he was promoted to lieutenant and was made commander of his company. He was promoted to Stabs-kapitan in 1888.

In 1902 he studied at the officer jäger school, he was promoted to the rank of lieutenant colonel. During 1903–1904, he was chairman of the regimental court. In 1904, he served in the 159th Gurian Infantry Regiment as the commander of its 3rd Battalion. In 1905, he was appointed as the regiment's commander and sent to Manchuria with the regiment. In 1906, he was transferred to the 3rd Don Infantry Regiment and was appointed commander of its 4th Battalion. In 1911, he was made colonel. In 1912 he was promoted to major general and released to reserve.

== Activity in Lithuania ==
On 29 March 1919, he joined the Lithuanian army as a volunteer. As an officer, he was appointed overseer of the bomb warehouse. Since 5 April, he served as head of the Military Aviation School.

After his death, R. Okulič-Kazarinas was awarded the Volunteer and the Lithuanian independence medals in 1930 and 1931 respectively.

== Bibliography ==
- Biography of Rapolas Okulič-Kazarinas
- Lietuvos kariuomenės karininkai 1918-1953 (in Lithuanian). Vilnius: Lietuvos nac. muziejus. 2001. ISBN 9955-415-11-8.
- Zabielskas, Vytautas. "Rapolas Okulič-Kazarinas". Vle.lt (in Lithuanian).
