= 1899 Russian student strike =

The 1899 Russian student strike was a student movement with the aim of establishing a constitutional, liberal, or progressive government in Russia. Russia's first ever student strike started at St Petersburg University.

== Background ==
Russia had no university until Moscow University was founded in 1755. It was shunned by the clergy (it was a secular institution) and the nobility (it didn't count towards finishing their service duty). There were no more before the nineteenth century. By 1914 there were ten universities, half in Russia proper (Moscow, St Petersburg, Saratov, Kazan and Tomsk) and the other half in minority regions (Warsaw, Odessa, Kiev, Kharkov and Tartu).

Until Alexander II became tsar in 1855, Russian students tended to be politically apathetic. In 1850 Nicholas I, fearful of the 1848 revolutions spreading, limited the student population. Inspectors punished students for not wearing uniforms, having long hair, or not attending military drills. These restrictions were removed after Alexander II's accession. From 1855 to 1858 the population of St. Petersburg University increased from 476 to 1,026. Its students set up a journal in 1856, then its editorial board created a friendly society (kassa) and a student body (skhodka) to discuss students' concerns, complete with an elected president. These institutions were illegal under the 1863 statute. Student radicalism was partly created by this and the even more repressive statute on August 23, 1884. The latter meant it was the minister of education, not the faculty council, who appointed the Rector and Curator. The Curator was the only one who could convene faculty council meetings and appoint department deacons. The council could communicate with the ministry only through him. The Curator appointed an inspector to discipline the students and decide who would get scholarships.

== Strike ==
St. Petersburg put up with student partying in Nevsky Prospekt every February 8. This was the anniversary of the founding of St. Petersburg University. Students would march through the city drinking, singing, and dancing. These marches became increasingly violent.

February 8, 1895: Students and janitors brawl in front of Palkin restaurant.

December 20, 1897: 500 students attend a protest and demand a meeting with the university rector, but only the Kiev Gendarme Chief, Vasily Fedorovich Novitsky, is able to forcibly make the rector meet with them. The meeting provides no substantial results.

February 8, 1898: The students try the same thing, this time fighting the police who disperse them.

The Ministry of Education decided to ban the street parties in 1899. The rector V I Sergeevich warned that partying students would be arrested for hooliganism. The students were appalled as they had already decided to be more restrained that year. They felt humiliated because the notice was published in the papers too.

February 8, 1899: The students are blocked by the police at the Dvortsovyi bridge (connecting the university's Vasilevskii Island to the city centre), then turn towards Rumiantsev square where mounted police ambush them. They respond to the students' snowballs with whips.

February 9: 3,000 students attend a skhodka. They call a student strike and elect an 11 strong Organization Committee. At this stage, few students wanted a political protest.

February 15: The strike spreads to Moscow University and Technological Institute. By now, 68 students had been arrested in St Petersburg.

February 16: The faculty council calls for the release of the arrested students, withdrawal of police from university grounds and for a temporary closure of the university.

February 20: Nicholas II called an investigatory commission on Witte's advice.

March 1: The Organization Committee calls a skhodka to decide if the strike should continue. It votes to halt the strike.

March 5: Moscow University also votes to end the strike after their rector Tikhomirov promises to petition the police to release arrested students.

March 8: Moscow's rector angers the students by banning student meetings without his permission. They vote 2–1 to resume the strike.

March 16–17: The St Petersburg skhodka meets twice, voting 825–601 in favour of a new strike.

March 18: The university is closed and all students suspended. They have five days to petition for reentry on condition that they stay out of the skhodka and other student groups.

March 20–21: The Okhrana expel all Organization Committee members from St. Petersburg. Students are forced to take their oral exams at the end of March to disrupt the strike. Students make it impossible for the exams to happen.

June: The Ministry of Education announces more dormitories and professors; also students have to enrol at the university nearest their secondary school.

July 29: 'Temporary Rules' allow for disruptive students to be conscripted as punishment.

== Student population ==
Measure	1859	1880	1897	1914
Student population	8,750	15,155	30,000	127,000
Students per 10,000 people	1.4	1.5	2.4	7.6
