= Antanas Kriščiukaitis =

Lithuanian writer and judge

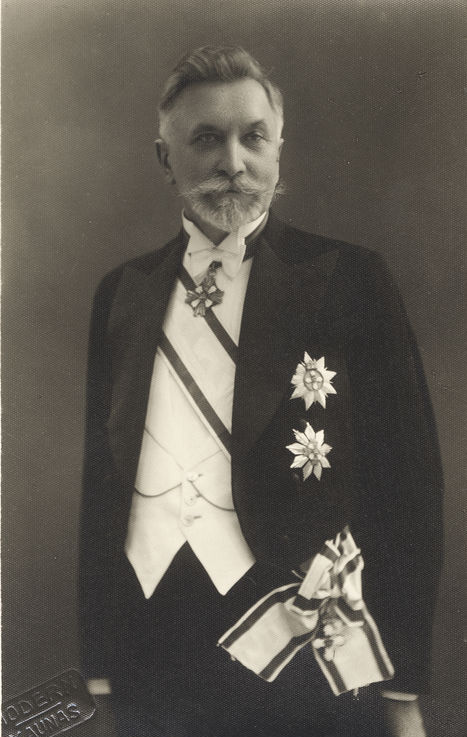
- Official portrait, 1931

Chairman of the Supreme Tribunal of Lithuania
- In office 10 December 1918 – 30 October 1933
- Preceded by: Office established
- Succeeded by: Liudas Ciplijauskas

Personal details
- Born: 24 July 1864 Paežeriai, Suwałki Governorate, Congress Poland
- Died: 30 October 1933 (aged 69) Kaunas, Lithuania
- Resting place: Petrašiūnai Cemetery
- Education: Imperial Moscow University
- Occupation: Judge, university professor, writer
- Awards: Order of Vytautas the Great (1931); Order of the Lithuanian Grand Duke Gediminas
- Pen name: Aišbė
- Member of: Society of Lithuanian Jurists

Antanas Kriščiukaitis, also known by the pen name Aišbė (24 July 1864 - 30 October 1933) was a Lithuanian writer and judge who served as the chairman of the Supreme Tribunal of Lithuania from 1918 until his death in 1933. A Lithuanian Society of Jurists member, Kriščiukaitis greatly influenced the development and modernisation of Lithuanian law.

Kriščiukaitis was born in Suvalkija to a family of well-off Lithuanian farmers. Already as a student at the Marijampolė Gymnasium, he started contributing articles to the Lithuanian press. He studied law at the Imperial Moscow University and joined a secret society of Lithuanian students, chaired by Petras Leonas. After his graduation in 1890, he worked as interrogator and judge in Moscow, Mitau (Jelgava), Tikhvin and Novgorod raising to the rank of State Councillor. He returned to Lithuania in 1918 and became chairman of the Lithuanian Tribunal. He became a professor of criminal law at the newly established University of Lithuania in 1922 and advisor to the State Council of Lithuania in 1929. He edited various legal texts, working to create new Lithuanian legal terms and standardize terminology. He received the Order of Vytautas the Great (1st class), the highest state award in Lithuania, in 1931. Kriščiukaitis died suddenly in 1933.

As a writer, Kriščiukaitis is known for his short stories that moved away from didacticism (which was prevalent in contemporary Lithuanian literature) to literary realism as well as satires and feuilletons. He published his works, articles, and translated texts in various Lithuanian periodicals, including Aušra and Varpas.

== Biography ==
=== Russian Empire ===
Kriščiukaitis was born on 24 July 1864 to a family of well-off Lithuanian farmers in Paežeriai in Suvalkija, then part of Congress Poland, a client state of the Russian Empire. Later his father moved to Būgnai, which gave Kriščiukaitis his pen name Aišbė derived from the cryptonym A-iš-B (A-from-B or Antanas from Būgnai). After graduating from a Russian primary school in Paežeriai in 1876, he continued studies at the Marijampolė Gymnasium. According to Juozas Tumas-Vaižgantas, Kriščiukaitis was interested in architecture and drew architectural plans of all churches in the area and even made a detailed model of the church in Alvitas. Already as a gymnasium student, he started writing in Lithuanian. His popular science text on the mathematical description of the earth was published in three issues of Aušra in 1884. He also sent a translation of The Gypsies by Alexander Pushkin, but it was not published. Like most Lithuanian parents of the time, his parents wanted him to become a priest, but he felt no calling and first chose mathematics at the University of Saint Petersburg in the fall of 1883. He quickly dropped his studies and considered studying architecture but started studying law at the Imperial Moscow University the following year. There he joined a secret society of Lithuanian students, chaired by Petras Leonas, and was its librarian.

He graduated in 1890 and served eight months in the Imperial Russian Army leaving it as a reserve praporshchik. Due to Russification policies, as a Catholic, Kriščiukaitis could not get a government job in Lithuania. In April 1891, he was appointed as a court candidate in Moscow. After about six months he was transferred to Mitau (Jelgava) where he met Jonas Jablonskis, Juozas Tumas-Vaižgantas, and other Lithuanian activists. After five years, he was assigned as a court interrogator in Tikhvin. At the same time, he married a Lithuanian woman, but she died a year later after giving birth to his son Jonas. He remarried in 1899. He was promoted to a district judge in 1904 and relocated to Novgorod in 1912 where he worked until the Russian Revolution. He ended his career with the Russian Empire courts as a State Councillor. During World War I, he worked with the Red Cross in Novgorod to help Lithuanian war refugees.

=== Independent Lithuania ===
Kriščiukaitis returned to Lithuania in September 1918 and started drafting laws for the Council of Lithuania. The Party of National Progress suggested Kriščiukaitis as the first Minister of Justice. Petras Leonas became the minister and Kriščiukaitis was appointed as the chairman of the Lithuanian Tribunal, the highest court in interwar Lithuania, on 10 December 1918. In 1920, he became co-founder and chairman of the Society of Lithuanian Jurists (Lietuvos teisininkų draugija) and editor of its journal Teisė (Law). In total, he edited 23 volumes of Teisė. In October 1922, he was invited to become a professor of the criminal law and procedure at the newly established University of Lithuania and started teaching in January 1923. His students summarized the lectures which were edited and approved by Kriščiukaitis and were published in 1928. From 1929, he was a specialist advisor to the State Council of Lithuania and worked with special commissions on legal terminology (which disbanded after his death), new criminal code, and civil registration. He was one of the major contributors and designers of the 1933 judicial reform. As the chairman of the Supreme Tribunal, Kriščiukaitis was a member of the advisory council to the Minister of Justice. On three occasions, he was acting Minister of Justice while the minister was away. He was also a member of the commissions on state awards.

Directed by Minister Antanas Tumėnas, Kriščiukaitis worked on translating and editing the 1903 criminal code of the Russian Empire which was still in effect in Lithuania in hopes of drafting a new criminal code; this project was not passed but it was used in the later translations of the Russian code. He was editor of two volumes of an unofficial collection of laws and regulations compiled by Antanas Merkys in 1922 and 1925 and of an anniversary book devoted to the first decade of the Lithuanian courts. As an editor, professor, and judge, he paid particular attention to the purity and correctness of the Lithuanian language, working to standardize Lithuanian legal terminology and create new terms. He worked to enforce the rule that Lithuanian language would be used for all legal proceedings despite complaints from Russian-speaking attorneys.

He received the Order of Vytautas the Great (1st class), the highest state award in Lithuania, and Order of the Lithuanian Grand Duke Gediminas (2nd class). He continued to work as a judge and university professor until his sudden death on 30 October 1933 in Kaunas. He was buried in the old city cemetery. When it was transformed into the present-day Ramybė Park, his body was reburied in the Petrašiūnai Cemetery. A memorial stone and wayside shrine were erected at his birthplace in 1970.

== Literary works ==
=== Articles in the press ===
Kriščiukaitis started writing and contributing to the Lithuanian press while he was still a gymnasium student. His first texts were published in Aušra and he also contributed to Tėvynės sargas, Vienybė lietuvninkų, Šviesa, Nemuno sargas, Varpas, Ūkininkas, and other periodicals. He often published translated texts – an essay of Jan Baudouin de Courtenay, excerpt from Urania by Camille Flammarion, fairy-tales The Most Incredible Thing and The Princess and the Pea by Hans Christian Andersen, poem The Sphinx by Ivan Turgenev, story Who is to Blame? by Yuriy Fedkovych. In 1894, Varpas published a lengthy article (due to length, it was published over five issues) by Kriščiukaitis about Armenian literature which was prepared based on a publication by Yuri Veselovsky. After the Lithuanian press ban was lifted in 1904, he contributed articles to Vilniaus žinios, Viltis, Vairas, Lietuvos balsas, Lietuvos aidas, Nepriklausoma Lietuva, Lietuva, Tauta, and others.

=== Short stories ===
He wrote a few poems, but his strongest genre was a short story. In 1892, he published Pajudinkime, vyrai, žemę! (Men, Let's Move the Earth!), a shortened translation of Eppur si muove - És mégis mozog a Föld by Mór Jókai. It was republished in 1921. The patriotic story depicts the Hungarian National Revival and was meant to indirectly draw parallels with the Lithuanian National Revival. The same year he published a collection of six short stories Kas teisybė – tai ne melas (What Is Truth That Is Not a Lie), which was enlarged and republished in 1905 and 1974. The initial collection included four original stories by Kriščiukaitis and two loose translations of Quench the Spark by Leo Tolstoy and The Little Cask by Guy de Maupassant. The collection also included Brička (britzka, a type of carriage), his best-known work. It is a humorous story about a Lithuanian couple who want to show off and acquire a britzka, but end up in a ditch after getting drunk.

When more Lithuanian writers appeared, he considered himself a "superfluous author" (atliekamas literatas) and starting in 1908 contributed a series of short satires and feuilletons to the Lithuanian press (mainly periodicals published by the Lithuanian Nationalist Union). A collection of these works, Satyros trupiniai (Crumbs of Satire), was published in 1928. His tragicomedy Laisvė (Freedom) which borrowed the plot from antiquity but discussed Lithuania's democracy was staged by the Vilkolakis Theater in 1923.

His works described the lives of Lithuanian peasants, the beginnings of capitalism in the village, and the cultural backwardness of the rural population. His stories moved away from didacticism (which was prevalent in contemporary Lithuanian literature) to literary realism. On occasion, his literary style and satire can be seen in his judicial work. For example, in 1927, in a ruling to dismiss the lower court judgement since it provided only a ruling and not the analysis of facts or applicable laws, Kriščiukaitis compared the lower court's judgement to Deus ex machina and Aphrodite rising from the sea foam.

=== Primer for children ===
In 1892, Varpas announced a competition for a new primer for children and received four submissions. The primer by Kriščiukaitis was awarded the 50 ruble prize and was printed in 1895. It was republished in 1901, 1903, and 1907. He understood that many children learned to read Lithuanian at home without any teacher's help. Therefore, he tried to include interesting sample texts to spark children's curiosity. He translated texts from a primer by Leo Tolstoy, added samples of Lithuanian folklore, and entirely skipped prayers or other religious texts – this attracted criticism from the clergy. Overall, the primer showed influence of Rodnoe slovo by Konstantin Ushinsky.

The primer also abandoned the old rote memorization of syllable-by-syllable (slebizavimas) in favor of the synthetic phonics. The introduction to the alphabet was originally reworked to suit the Lithuanian language. Very likely that in this work Kriščiukaitis was assisted by linguist Jonas Jablonskis. While pedagogically it was a much-improved primer, it was not very popular and republished only six years later due to the criticism by the clergy and because people used to the old method of slebizavimas did not know how to teach the new method to children. Therefore, when Povilas Višinskis published his primer in 1905, he added an instruction to parents and teachers on how to teach this new method.
