= Konstantinas Avižienis =

Lithuanian military officer (1894 – 1922)

Captain Konstantinas Avižienis
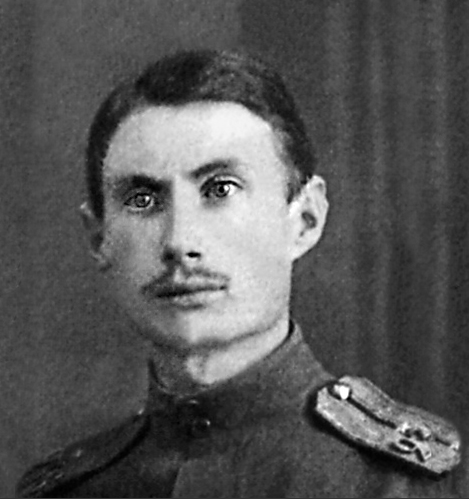
- Avižienis in uniform
- Born: April 17, 1894; Skardupiai, Russian Empire
- Died: 2 January 1922 (aged 27); Moscow, Russian SFSR
- Cause of death: Murder
- Burial place: Marijampolė cemetery
- Other names: Kostas, Konstantas
- Education: Moscow Imperial University
- Military career
- Allegiance: Lithuania
- Service years: 1919–1922 (Lithuanian Army)
- Rank: Captain
- Unit: 1st Artillery Regiment
- Conflicts: Lithuanian Wars of Independence
- Awards: Order of the Cross of Vytis, fifth and first degrees

Konstantinas Avižienis (17 April 1894 – 2 January 1922) was a Lithuanian military officer who acted as an assistant military attaché in Moscow under Jurgis Baltrušaitis. Avižienis collected personal documents of some Russian covert agents working in Lithuania, and after sending them back to the country, was shortly killed. Despite the official explanation being that Avižienis was killed by a jealous husband, it is widely believed that Avižienis was murdered by a Cheka agent due to him sending sensitive information to Lithuania.

== Life ==
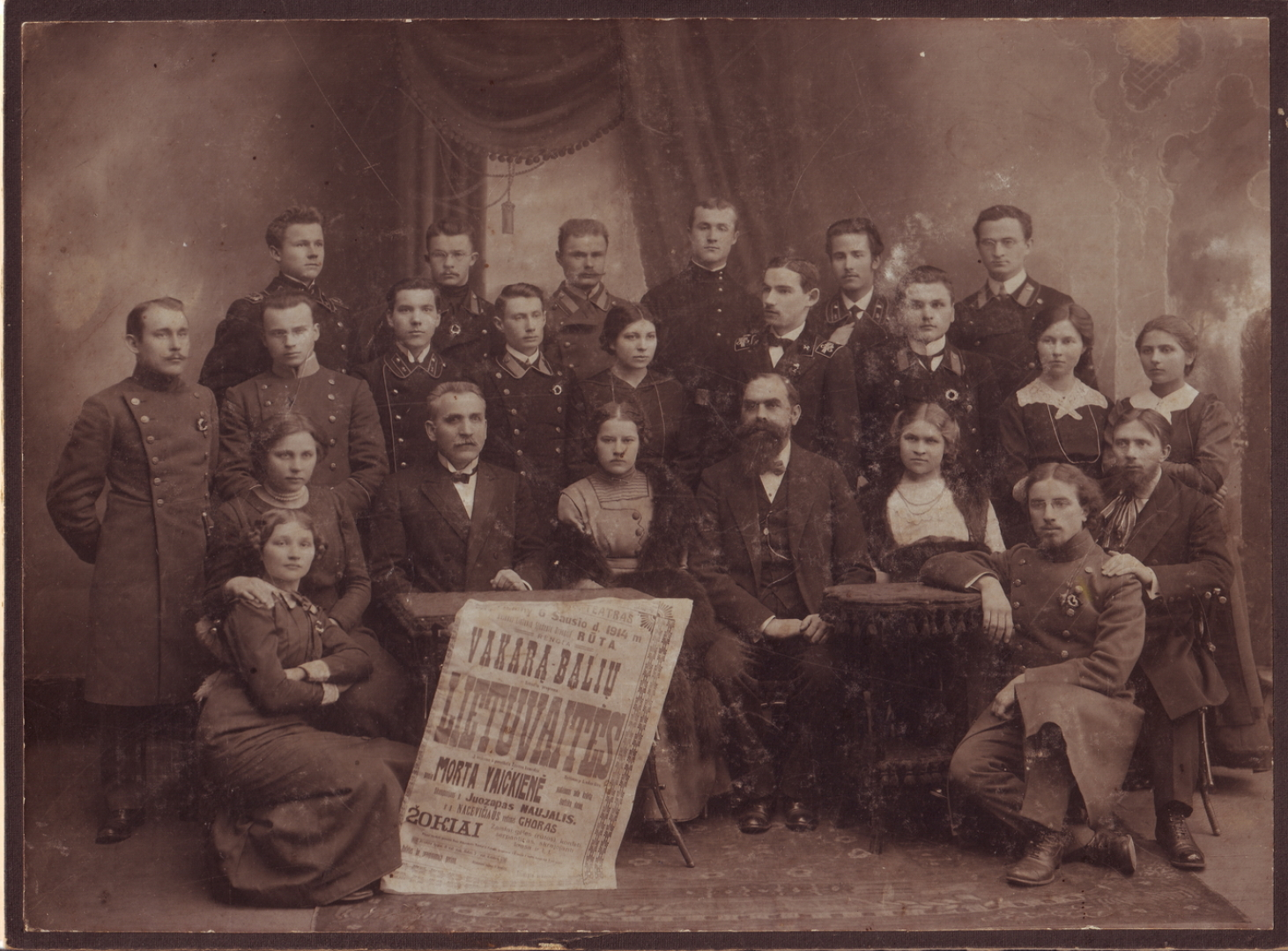
Rūta Students' Society on 6 January 1914. Avižienis is standing in the second row, fourth from the left side.

=== Early life and military career ===
Konstantinas Avižienis was born on 17 April 1894 in the village of Skardupiai. From 1913 to 1916, he studied physics and mathematics at Moscow Imperial University. Avižienis was part of the Rūta Lithuanian Students' Society, where in 1914 he was one of the members responsible of organizing a societal evening. In 1917, he was mobilized to the Imperial Russian Army. He then graduated from the St. Petersburg Infantry Cadet School with the rank of podporuchik. After returning to Lithuania in 1919, Avižienis was mobilized into the newly-formed Lithuanian Army's 1st Artillery Regiment. He was made lieutenant on 8 October 1920. From 1920 to 1921, Avižienis served as the regiment's adjutant, as well as a senior officer of the sixth battery, and chief of the ninth battery (since 1 August). He was awarded the Order of the Cross of Vytis, fifth degree, and was promoted to captain on 16 March 1921. On 12 September 1921, he was transferred to the general staff.

=== Attaché in Moscow and death ===
After being transferred to the general staff, Avižienis was made a military attaché in Moscow on 1 October 1921. He was an assistant of Jurgis Baltrušaitis, the Lithuanian ambassador to Russia from 1920 to 1939. On 6 December 1921, Avižienis sent sensitive documents to Lithuania, with which he informed that M. Butkienė-Zablockaitė was an agent of Soviet authorities and was intensively collecting information on the Lithuanian Army, and as such, she should be arrested immediately. On 2 January 1922, Avižienis was found dead. Although the killer, named Zheldukov-Pavlov, was found guilty, the Soviet government did not officially conduct any investigation into his motives.

Avižienis was buried in the Marijampolė cemetery. He was posthumously awarded the Order of the Cross of Vytis, 1st degree.

== Reception and possible causes of death ==
The death of Avižienis caused outrage in the Lithuanian press. Minister of Foreign Affairs Vladas Jurgutis sent a note to the Soviet government where he demanded to clarify the circumstances of the crime and severely punish the culprits. Outrage worsened when it was revealed that when Aivžienis's body was being transferred to Lithuania, the escort was stopped in Sebezh by Cheka agents. Under the pretext of potentially finding sensitive documents, the coffin was opened and shaken out, and Avižienis's body was thrown out onto the snow. Eventually, the NKID later apologized, calling the actions of the Soviet agents blasphemy.

An official explanation was published on 14 January 1922 in the official newspaper Lietuva – according to witnesses, Avižienis, while studying in Moscow, had to earn money by teaching. In 1915 he worked as a tutor for the children of a rich landlord in Tula. There he met Marija, one of the landlord's daughters. After graduating from the St. Petersburg Infantry Cadet School, Avižienis intended to marry Marija. However, her parents disallowed the marriage as Avižienis descended from a peasant family. Avižienis met Marija once more in Oryol around 1918, but began correspondence with her after returning to Lithuania. Marija, however, due to the consequences of the Russian Revolution and necessity, married a Red Army officer named Zheldukov-Pavlov. On the evening of 1 January 1922, Marija, her half-sister, and Avižienis went to the theater. The company returned to spend the night in Avižienis's apartment. The following day, everyone except Marija and Avižienis left the building. After Zheldukov-Pavlov came in and found them both, he proceeded to murder Avižienis. The newspaper Trimitas, which wrote about the event on 10 January, said that the "death was not of a political nature".

Avižienis also possibly was involved in Juozas Purickis's corruption scandal, as Avižienis was the addressee of 4 kilograms (8.8 lb) of cocaine in a wider attempt to bypass Lithuanian customs services using diplomatic exemption. According to Bernardas Gailius, it is highly suspicious that possibly the main suspect of the "saccharine case" died just in the heat of the interrogations; the question of who exactly sent Avižienis the cocaine did not arise, and the court seemingly avoided discussing clues against Avižienis.

After Avižienis's death, Jurgis Baltrušaitis noted that the Russians were very unhappy with how the Lithuanian press wrote about the death of Avižienis, accenting their especially negative perception of an article in the Christian Democrat daily newspaper Laisvė. Baltrušaitis wrote to the Lithuanian Ministry of Foreign Affairs to not publish the article, which was entitled Rusija ir Lietuva (Russia and Lithuania). Furthermore, for being responsible for Avižienis's death, Baltrušaitis accused not the "Bolshevik barbarians", but rather another military attaché named Kazys Svila. Supposedly, Svila invited Avižienis's sister to Kaunas to "cause ruffle". Diplomat Vytautas Žalys considers Baltrušaitis's actions to be appeasement of the Soviet Union's foreign policy.

== See also ==
- Vytautas Pociūnas
