= Silvestras Leonas =

Lithuanian military officer

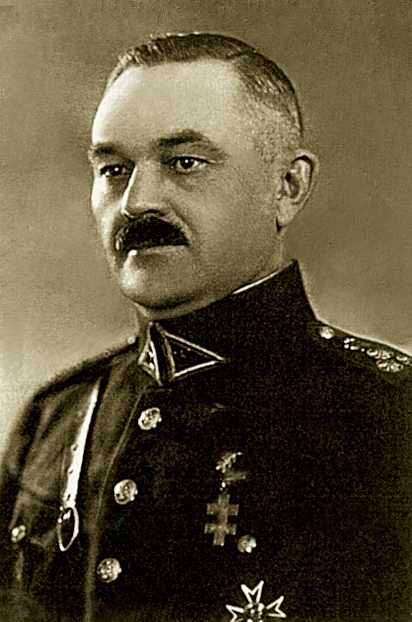
- Leonas with uniform of the Lithuanian Army and state awards

Minister of Internal Affairs
- In office 24 March 1938 – 28 March 1939
- Prime Minister: Vladas Mironas
- Preceded by: Julius Čaplikas
- Succeeded by: Kazys Skučas

Personal details
- Born: 15 January 1894 Leskava, Suwałki Governorate, Congress Poland
- Died: 17 November 1959 (aged 65) Kaunas, Lithuanian SSR
- Resting place: Plutiškės Cemetery
- Relatives: Uncle Petras Leonas
- Education: University of Lithuania
- Military career
- Allegiance: Russian Empire; Lithuania
- Branch: Russian Imperial Army; Lithuanian Army
- Service years: 1916–1925, 1934–1939
- Rank: Praporshchik (Sept. 1916); Podporuchik (July 1917); Senior lieutenant (Nov. 1919); Captain (May 1920); Major (Dec. 1923); Lieutenant colonel (June 1934); Polkovnik (July 1936)
- Conflicts: World War I Lithuanian Wars of Independence

Silvestras Leonas (1894–1959) was a Lithuanian military officer. After serving in the Russian Imperial Army during World War I, Leonas joined the Lithuanian Army and fought in the Lithuanian Wars of Independence. He completed law studies at the University of Lithuania and worked as a judge. In 1934–1935, he presided over the Military Tribunal trial of Neumann–Sass that involved 122 defendants accused of anti-Lithuanian activities. From March 1938 to March 1939, he was Minister of Internal Affairs in the government of Prime Minister Vladas Mironas. In 1944, Leonas was arrested by the NKVD and imprisoned in a Gulag camp. He returned to Lithuania in 1956.

== Biography ==
Leonas was born on 15 January 1894 to a family of Lithuanian farmers. After graduation from the Second Men's Gymnasium in Vilnius, he continued to study at the Moscow University and Kharkiv University but was drafted to the Russian Imperial Army in May 1916. He completed military courses in Chuhuiv and was promoted to praporshchik in September 1916. After the promotion to podporuchik in July 1917, Leonas was transferred to the 2nd Battalion of the Russian Railway Troops.

Leonas returned to Lithuania in 1919 and was mobilized on 1 July 1919 into the Lithuanian Army and assigned to the 8th Infantry Regiment. He saw action in the Lithuanian Wars of Independence against Soviet Russia (July 1919 – January 1920) and Poland (August–November 1920). In February 1920, he helped to subdue a revolt by Lithuanian soldiers in Kaunas and was promoted to captain. He completed Higher Officers' Courses in October 1923 and was promoted to major. He retired from the military after graduating from the Law Faculty of University of Lithuania in 1925. He worked as a judge in Biržai, Telšiai, Šiauliai. After a judicial reform in 1933, he became a judge of the appellate court.

On 16 June 1934, after the failed coup d'état by the Voldemarininkai, he returned to military duty and became the presiding judge of the Military Tribunal. He presided over the high-profile trial of Neumann and Sass. The case involved 122 defendants – Nazi sympathizers that were accused of various anti-Lithuanian activities in the Klaipėda Region. In March 1938, after the Polish ultimatum to Lithuania, he became Minister of Internal Affairs in the new cabinet assembled by Prime Minister Vladas Mironas. In this capacity, Leonas issued many laws and directives, many of them on sale of pharmaceuticals, health clinics, and other health care issues. He also implemented the law establishing a council (Lithuanian: Visuomeninio darbo valdyba) to monitor and control various societies and organizations giving even more power to the authoritarian regime of Antanas Smetona to control political opponents. The government was forced to resign after the German ultimatum to Lithuania in March 1939. He again retired from the military on 31 March 1939. In May 1940, Leonas was appointed as a judge of the Lithuanian Tribunal.

After the Soviet occupation of Lithuania in June 1940, Leonas was arrested on 11 July 1940 and imprisoned in Kaunas and later Lubyanka Prison. He was freed at the start of the German invasion of the Soviet Union and anti-Soviet uprising in June 1941. During the German occupation, Leonas worked as an attorney in Kaunas. When the Red Army returned to Lithuania, Leonas was arrested by the NKVD in November 1944 and sentenced to 10 years of prison and 5 years of exile. He was imprisoned in a Gulag camp in Abez, Komi Republic. Later, he was transferred to the Irkutsk Oblast. He returned to Lithuania in 1956 and died three years later in Kaunas.

== Awards ==
Leonas received the following awards:

- Order of the Cross of Vytis (5th degree, 1921)
- Independence Medal (1928)
- Medal of the 10th Anniversary of the Liberation of Latvia (1929)
- Order of the Lithuanian Grand Duke Gediminas (3rd degree, 1931)
- Order of Vytautas the Great (3rd degree, 1937)
