= Juozas Purickis =

Lithuanian politician (1883–1934)

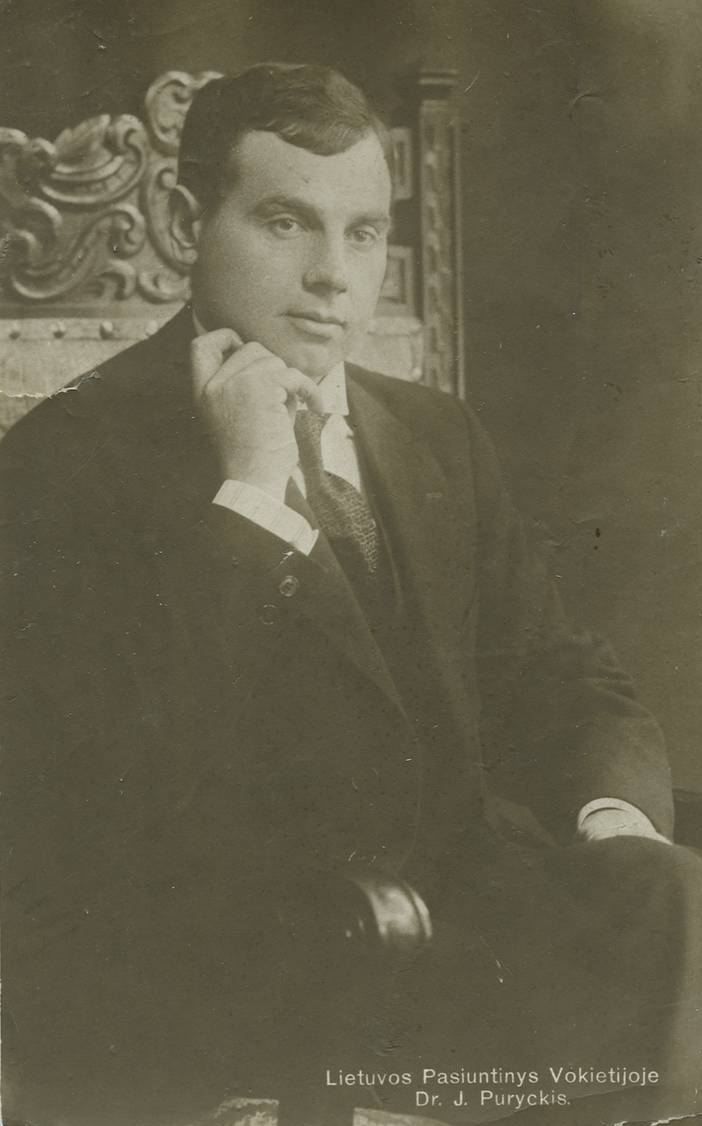

Minister of Foreign Affairs
- In office 19 June 1920 – 12 December 1921
- Prime Minister: Kazys Grinius
- Preceded by: Augustinas Voldemaras
- Succeeded by: Vladas Jurgutis

Personal details
- Born: 19 April 1883 Petrošiškės, Vilna Governorate, Russian Empire
- Died: 25 October 1934 (aged 51) Kaunas, Lithuania
- Party: Lithuanian Christian Democratic Party
- Education: Kaunas Priest Seminary; Saint Petersburg Roman Catholic Theological Academy; University of Fribourg
- Occupation: Diplomat, journalist

Juozas Purickis (sometimes Juozas Puryckis; often used pen name Vygandas; 1883 – 1934) was a prominent diplomat and journalist in interwar Lithuania and served as the Minister of Foreign Affairs from June 1920 to December 1921, as well as the acting Prime Minister of Lithuania for two months at the end of 1921 during the leave of absence of Prime Minister Kazys Grinius

Purickis studied at the Kaunas Priest Seminary and Saint Petersburg Roman Catholic Theological Academy. He was ordained a Roman Catholic priest, but never practiced or performed pastoral work. He married in 1926 and was officially defrocked in 1929. He continued his studies at the University of Fribourg in Switzerland and in 1916 earned his doctorate of theology with a thesis on the Reformation in Lithuania. During World War I, he joined the efforts to establish independent Lithuania – he worked at the Lithuanian Information Bureau established by Juozas Gabrys, raised money for the Lithuanian prisoners of war and war refugees, attended the Lithuanian conferences in Switzerland. Together with Konstantinas Olšauskas, Purickis attended Vilnius Conference and presented on the German proposal to establish Kingdom of Lithuania. In 1918–1920, Purickis worked as Lithuanian diplomatic representative in Berlin, first as a deputy of Jurgis Šaulys, and played a key role in the election of Wilhelm Karl, Duke of Urach, as King Mindaugas II of Lithuania, and was co-opted by the Council of Lithuania. Purickis as a delegate of the Lithuanian Christian Democratic Party was elected to the Constituent Assembly of Lithuania which convened in May 1920. Next month, he became Minister of Foreign Affairs in the government of Prime Minister Kazys Grinius. He had to deal with the issue that shaped the entire interwar foreign policy of Lithuania – the loss of Vilnius Region to the Second Polish Republic in the Żeligowski's Mutiny in October 1920 and the subsequent ineffectual mediation efforts of the League of Nations. During his tenure, Lithuania gained international recognition and became a full member of the League of Nations.

On December 12, 1921, Purickis resigned due to a corruption scandal, the so-called saccharin case. Lithuanian counterintelligence had seized three train cars that had been traveling under a diplomatic exemption heading to the Soviet Union, and investigated their cargo. Two cars contained donated food (sugar and flour) for the victims of the Russian famine of 1921–22, but the third contained various black market items, including almost 10 tonnes (22,000 lb) of saccharin, to be sold for profit. Purickis and three other men were investigated, put on trial, and acquitted in February 1925. While the case was ongoing, Purickis lived mostly in Germany helping the Lithuanian government with the Klaipėda Revolt and trade negotiations with Germany and Sweden. He also started contributing articles, mostly on economic developments and current political affairs, to the Lithuanian press. After the acquittal, he returned to Lithuania and rejoined the Ministry of Foreign Affairs as director of the Economic Department and later Law–Administrative Department, but resigned when his party withdrew from the government in May 1927. Purickis then devoted his life to journalism and other public work. He was editor of the official daily Lietuva (1925–1930) and magazine on economy Tautos ūkis (since 1930) and author of numerous articles in Lietuvos aidas, Trimitas, Vairas, Mūsų Vilnius. He was chairman of the Lithuanian Journalists' Union from its establishment in 1929 to his death. He was an active member of the Lithuanian Riflemen's Union and a board member of the League for the Liberation of Vilnius as well as of many different societies, often working on international integration and collaboration.

== Early life and education ==
According to his baptismal records discovered in early 2000s, Purickis was born on 19 April 1883 in Petrošiškės about 9 kilometres (5.6 mi) east of Semeliškės in the present-day Elektrėnai Municipality. Earlier works provided that he was born on 12 November 1883 in nearby Pakrovai where his father later bought a 60-hectare (150-acre) farm. It appears that his family was of noble origin, but their property was confiscated by the Tsarist authorities for their participation in the failed Uprising of 1863. Purickis' uncle served 25 years in katorga in Siberia; his parents rented various farms to make a living. Purickis had four other brothers.

In 1891, Purickis began his education at the parish school in Stakliškės that he attended with Liudas Gira (they remained close friends for life). Local priest Vincentas Butvydas, who was implicated in a book smuggling operation set up by bishop Motiejus Valančius, took care of the boys and encouraged them to pursue priesthood. After a year, Purickis transferred to a Russian government school in Jieznas and graduated in 1895. He showed an aptitude for learning, but due to financial difficulties could not pursue further education for three years and helped his family with farm work. With the help from a relative and Butvydas, Purickis moved to Kaunas in 1898 to study privately. He passed four-year school exams in Moscow in 1902 and enrolled into the Kaunas Priest Seminary in 1904. Many clerics would not graduate from the seminary. Out of 48 students admitted in 1905 only 13 graduated. The seminary was a center of Lithuanian culture with professors such as Juozapas Skvireckas, Kazimieras Šaulys, Adomas Jakštas. Purickis got acquainted with Juozas Tumas-Vaižgantas and belonged to a student group that was interested in Lithuanian history, language, culture.

Upon graduation in 1908, Purickis was sent for further studies at the Saint Petersburg Roman Catholic Theological Academy. He was ordained as subdeacon in June 1909 and deacon in his final year of study. He graduated in 1912 with a master's degree in theology and a gold medal for academic excellence. He returned to Kaunas and was assigned as a teacher to the Kaunas Priest Seminary. At the same time, he collected data for his thesis on the Reformation in Lithuania and published his first studies in Draugija. It appears that Purickis traveled to Switzerland to study at the University of Fribourg without the proper government permits. His letters to Liudas Gira show that he was already in Fribourg in March 1913 and spent the summer in Rome collecting information for his thesis. According to a note by rector of the university, Purickis was officially registered as a student in June 1914. He defended his thesis on the reasons for the failure of the Reformation in Lithuania on 25 July 1916 and was awarded a doctorate. The thesis was mostly a historical work based on many archival documents and the first extensive study on the subject. His contemporaries often disagreed with Purickis' harsh criticism of the Roman Catholic Church, but he took a rather novel approach at evaluating the Reformation in the larger political, social, and economic context.

== War relief efforts ==
In Switzerland, Purickis joined Lithuanian cultural life and became a member of Rūta and Lituania student societies. In December 1915, he became the secretary of the Central Committee for the Relief of War Victims in Lithuania, chaired by Bronisław Piłsudski. A number of Polish nobles belonged to the committee and soon Lithuanian representatives began clashing with them over the political issues of future independent Poland and Lithuania. A particular issue was 50,000 Swiss francs raised by a Polish committee led by Henryk Sienkiewicz and Ignacy Jan Paderewski and sent to Vilnius. At least a third of the sum was supposed to be given to Lithuanian-speaking residents, but according to Swiss Lithuanians all of the money were used for Polish refugees. Therefore, Lithuanians decided to separate from the Central Committee and establish their own. They collected about 10,000 francs and sent to the Lithuanian Society for the Relief of War Sufferers.

In November 1915, Purickis expanded and reorganized the Lituania student society into a society that provided support to Lithuanian prisoners of war in Germany, Austria, and elsewhere. In December 1916, after breaking up from the Polish committee, the society's mission was further expanded to encompass relief for all war victims and refugees. Purickis became secretary of a six-person committee that organized the worldwide donation drive in Roman Catholic churches on the Lithuanian Day (20 May 1917). Purickis traveled to Marseille to mail the appeal for donation to bishops around the world and personally visited French bishops and priests promoting the donation drive. In early 1916, Lituania joined the Lithuanian Information Bureau established by Juozas Gabrys and Purickis became bureau's collaborator. The bureau published two monthly magazines, Pro Lituania in French and Litauen in German. Purickis wrote many articles for these journals and edited Litauen as well as published three separate booklets with his thesis on the Reformation, about Lithuania's economy to encourage foreign trade and investments, and about the ethnic composition of the Grodno Governorate to substantiate Lithuania's territorial claims in the region. He also attended the Lithuanian conferences during World War I that were held in Switzerland.

== Work for Lithuania's independence ==
=== Unofficial diplomat ===
Lithuanians in Switzerland established contacts with Matthias Erzberger, an influential German politician of the Centre Party and an alumnus of the University of Fribourg. While on his way to Rome to meet the pope, he met with Lithuanian representatives on 22 August 1917 in Brunnen and proposed to establish a constitutional monarchy in Lithuania and elect a German monarch to prevent the German plan for a personal union between Lithuania and the Kingdom of Prussia. Three Lithuanian representatives – Purickis, Konstantinas Olšauskas, and Antanas Steponaitis – traveled to German-occupied Lithuania to report on the proposal to the Vilnius Conference held on 18–22 September 1917. To avoid the police, they had to use fake passports (Purickis used Pietaris last name). They were held up in Berlin and arrived only on 20 September. Purickis delivered a speech in which he argued that Lithuania should politically align itself with Germany and United States. It was not well received as Lithuanians suffered from harsh policies of German authorities and felt no interest from the United States. After the conference, Purickis briefly visited his relatives and then departed to Stockholm to attend the Lithuanian conference of 18–20 October that included Lithuanian representatives from Lithuania, Russia, United States, Scandinavia, and Switzerland. The conference approved the resolution adopted by the Vilnius Conference, recognized the Council of Lithuania as the legitimate representative of the Lithuanian nation, and reiterated Lithuania's desire for full independence.

On their way back to Switzerland, Purickis and Olšauskas again met with Erzberger who promised to ease German military occupation and replace it a civilian administration, reopen Vilnius University (closed in 1832), and help replacing Kazimierz Mikołaj Michalkiewicz, the administrator of the Diocese of Vilnius, with a Lithuanian bishop. Erzberger further helped Purickis and Olšauskas to arrange a meeting with Eugenio Pacelli, then an Apostolic Nuncio to Germany and future Pope Pius XII. Pacelli received them coldly and asserted that after the war the Vatican envisioned Poland and Lithuania as one state. They also traveled to Colmar to meet with Wilhelm Karl, Duke of Urach, the proposed monarch for Lithuania. Upon return to Switzerland, Purickis and Olšauskas participated in the second conference in Bern which discussed strategies for securing Lithuania's independence, issues of future state borders of Lithuania, proposals for forms of government, etc.

=== Official representative in Berlin ===
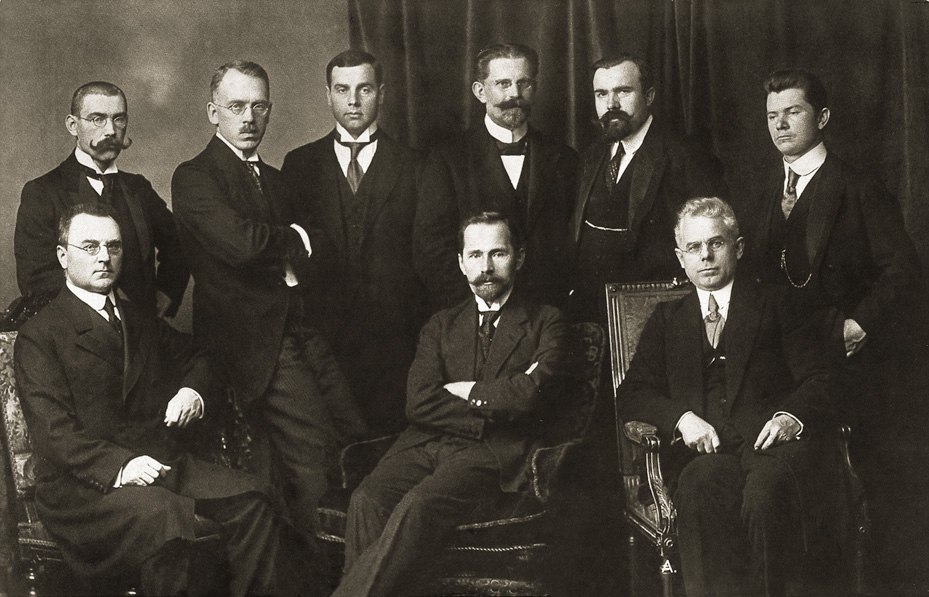
Purickis (standing third from the left) with a delegation of the Council of Lithuania in Berlin to discuss the formation of the first Lithuanian government

Purickis then returned to Vilnius and attended a few meetings of the Council of Lithuania. On 13 December 1917, the council decided to send Jurgis Šaulys as its diplomatic representative to Berlin and appoint Purickis and Antanas Janulatis as his deputies. In Germany, Purickis worked to garner support for Wilhelm Karl, Duke of Urach, to be elected King of Lithuania. He visited the Duke and his family, gathered biographical information and character references, and obtained his tentative agreement to become King of Lithuania. Purickis and Martynas Yčas drafted a twelve-point list of conditions that the Duke had to accept before his election. On 4 June 1918, the Presidium of the Council of Lithuania voted confidentially to establish the hereditary Kingdom of Lithuania. Purickis delivered the decision and list of conditions to Duke Wilhelm Karl and his son and heir apparent Karl Gero and they accepted it on 1 July. On 13 July, the Council of Lithuania officially elected Duke Wilhelm Karl as Mindaugas II, King of Lithuania. That caused a crisis within the council as four it its members resigned in protest. At the same time, six new members – including Purickis – were co-opted. However, Purickis continued to spend most of his time in Germany working on Lithuanian diplomatic issues and organizing relief for Lithuanian war victims.

As Germany was losing World War I, the new government of Prince Maximilian of Baden allowed Lithuanians to form their own government. Prime Minister Augustinas Voldemaras organized the first cabinet on 11 November 1918. Purickis was considered for Minister of Education, but Jonas Yčas was chosen instead. Purickis once again returned to Germany working on the German Army withdrawal from Lithuania, German military support in the Lithuanian Wars of Independence, financial support for the newly reestablished Lithuanian State, and official de jure recognition. In March 1919, Jurgis Šaulys was reassigned to represent Lithuania in Switzerland and Purickis became the Lithuanian Envoys Extraordinary and Minister Plenipotentiary to Germany. Living conditions were difficult due to the post-war chaos and the German Revolution of 1918–1919; in a surviving letter to Vilius Gaigalaitis, Purickis asked send him food. Despite the difficulties, in early 1920 Purickis organized a society to provide financial aid to Lithuanian students in Germany. It raised 50,000 German Papiermarks and operated a canteen in Berlin.

== Minister of Foreign Affairs ==
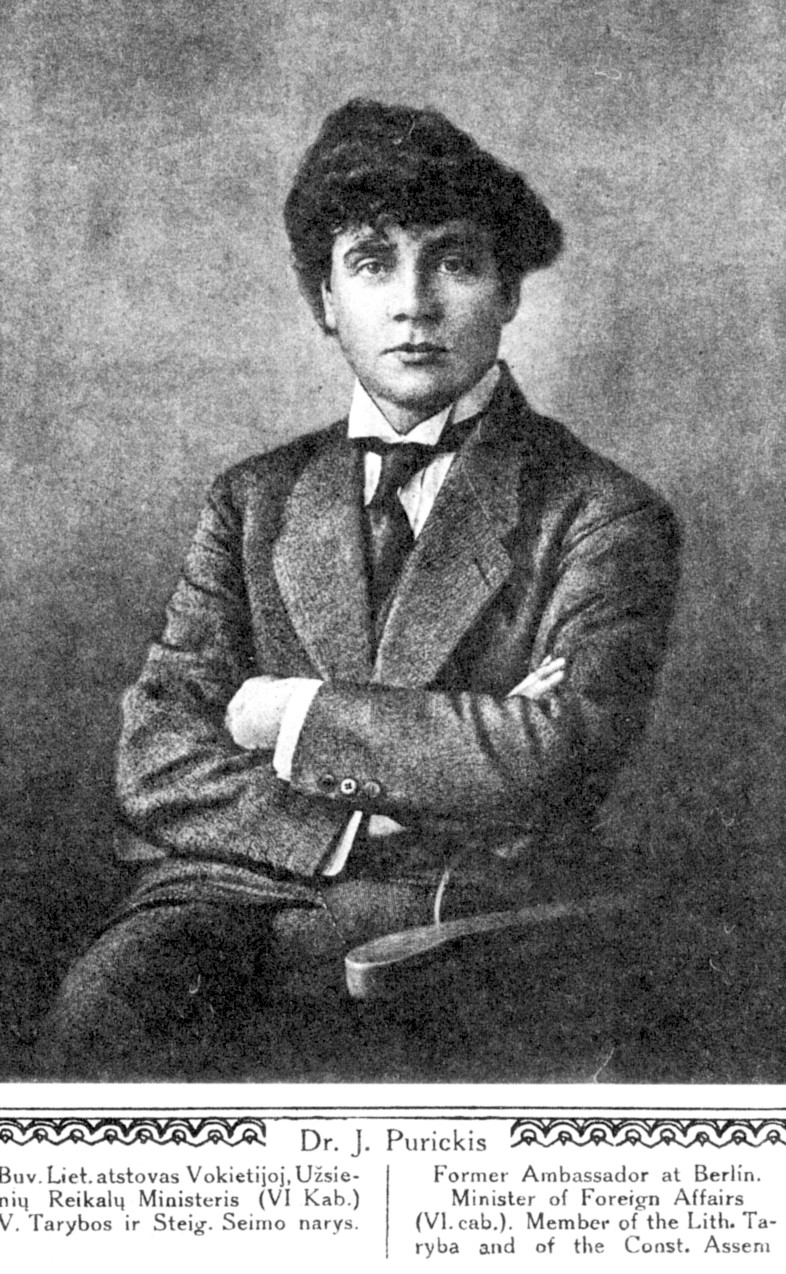
Purickis from Album of Lithuania published in 1921

In April 1920, Purickis as a delegate of the Lithuanian Christian Democratic Party was elected to the Constituent Assembly of Lithuania in the IV district of Utena. The Assembly convened on 15 May and Purickis was elected to the commission for drafting the Constitution of Lithuania. On Jun 19, Prime Minister Kazys Grinius organized a new government and Purickis became the Minister of Foreign Affairs. At the time, Lithuania was in a difficult international position. It was recognized de jure only by Germany; many of the Western powers did not recognize Lithuania even de facto as they still hoped for some kind of Polish–Lithuanian union in the spirit of the former Polish–Lithuanian Commonwealth. During Purickis' tenure, Lithuania was recognized de jure by Sweden, Norway, Latvia, Soviet Union, Estonia, Argentina, Mexico, Switzerland, Denmark, Holland, Brazil and became a full member of the League of Nations on 22 September 1921.

In July 1920, Lithuania concluded the Soviet–Lithuanian Peace Treaty which recognized Vilnius Region to Lithuania. When Poland achieved a major victory in the Battle of Warsaw and forced the Soviets to retreat in August 1920, Lithuanians defended their new borders while Poland claimed that Lithuania became a Soviet ally (see the Polish–Lithuanian War). Under pressure from the League of Nations, Poland signed the Suwałki Agreement on 7 October 1920 but immediately staged the Żeligowski's Mutiny and captured Vilnius from the Lithuanians. Polish general Lucjan Żeligowski proclaimed creation of the Republic of Central Lithuania with capital in Vilnius. Lithuania and Poland began the prolonged mediation at the League of Nations. Purickis and a delegation of the Constituent Assembly visited political and religious leaders in London, Paris, Berlin, Rome in largely unsuccessful attempt to garner support for the Lithuanian cause. Lithuanians rejected plans for a plebiscite or a compromise solution drawn up by Paul Hymans. At about 3:30 am on 19 June 1921, an unknown person shot at Purickis' bedroom window in an apparent assassination attempt. Purickis was not injured. The police did not find a suspect but historians believe that the incident was provoked by Purickis' soft diplomatic stance on the issue of the plebiscite and Hymans' plans. As the mediation efforts stalled, there were no diplomatic relations between Poland and Lithuania until the Polish ultimatum on 1938.

As a counterbalance to Poland, Purickis sought out closer relationship with Latvia and Estonia. In March 1921, Lithuania and Latvia concluded a treaty determining the Latvia–Lithuania border. Lithuania gained Palanga and Šventoji; Latvia gained Ilūkste and Aknīste. The three countries concluded various conventions on communications, extradition of criminals, consular services, but Purickis great hope for the Baltic Entente was not realized until 1934. Purickis also standardized the Lithuanian Diplomatic Service, its structure, staff, pay, and organized a conference of all Lithuanian diplomats in October–November 1921. When Prime Minister Kazys Grinius took a month-long medical leave in October 1921, Purickis became the acting Prime Minister. However, he was forced to resign due to a corruption scandal (smuggling contraband items using diplomatic privileges) in December 1921. The scandal created a government crisis and forced Grinius' Cabinet to resign on 18 January 1922 and is cited among the reasons for the poor Lithuanian Christian Democratic Party results in the May 1926 parliamentary elections.

== Corruption scandal ==
According to the findings of the Lithuanian Tribunal, Juozas Avižonis, deputy of the Lithuanian representative to Moscow Jurgis Baltrušaitis, attended a celebration of the 4th anniversary of the October Revolution and made an impromptu promise to Georgy Chicherin to supply two train cars worth of flour and sugar for the relief of the Russian famine of 1921–22. Since the Lithuanian government did not have enough funds to purchase the supplies, Avižonis found Zacharias Milikovsky, a former owner of a factory in Moscow, who agreed to finance the two train cars in exchange for a third train car that he could fill up with other goods for his business. The cars would travel under a diplomatic exemption and thus would not be inspected by police or custom officers. Purickis, not wanting to risk an incident with the Russians and not having other means of fulfilling the promise, approved the deal. Lithuanian counter-intelligence, led by Jonas Polovinskas-Budrys, learned of the affair and stopped the train in Joniškis on 29 November 1921. An inspection of the train cars revealed 299 boxes of sugar and 184 bags of wheat flour, but also 194 boxes (almost 10 tonnes or 22,000 pounds) of saccharin, 13 boxes with foodstuffs (sausage, cocoa, butter, apples, pasta, rice, etc.), 4 kilograms (8.8 lb) of cocaine, four boxes of various fashion accessories, three boxes of alcohol, a box of candies. At the time, saccharin was sold only pharmacies and special procedures applied to its export. The cocaine was in a package addressed to Konstantinas Avižienis, Lithuanian military attaché in Moscow, but he was murdered by a local communist on 2 January 1922. According to a story published in the daily Lietuva, Avižienis was murdered by a jealous husband of his lover. On 10 February 1925, after a prolonged investigation, the Lithuanian Tribunal found Purickis, Avižonis, and two others not guilty.

The Tribunal portrayed the so-called saccharin case as an isolated episode, but there is plenty of evidence that the practice of smuggling items in diplomatic packages was well known and widespread. Due to the famine, Russians lacked food but had plenty of valuables (including furniture, rugs, tableware, jewelry, art, fur) that were confiscated from nobles and bourgeoisie. A business plan was developed – food items purchased in Germany would arrive to Kaunas legally and then would be transported to Russia in diplomatic packages where they would be exchanged for valuables. In his memoirs, Lithuanian diplomat Bronius Kazys Balutis wrote that the practice was justified as a way to recover at least some of the confiscated property and at one point it was even semi-legalized when a special commission assessed a 10% tax on the items brought back from Russia. Surviving letters by Avižonis show that he moved items worth billions of roubles (then subject to hyperinflation) and that he planned to use the money to purchase a building for the Lithuanian legation in Moscow. In his memoirs, Jonas Polovinskas-Budrys claimed that on the Russian side, the trade was organized by the Cheka and thus could be easily used to blackmail Lithuanian officials into spying for the Russians. Avižonis is known to have established contacts with Cheka men Semyon Aralov, Yakov Davydov, Vyacheslav Menzhinsky.

Immediately after his resignation, Purickis left for Germany. He was subject to widespread criticism and ridicule in the opposition press, particularly by Augustinas Voldemaras. The Constituent Assembly of Lithuania launched an investigation into the finances of the Lithuanian legations in Berlin and Moscow. The state auditor found several large bank accounts in Purickis' name. He explained that he did not keep very good records due to the post-war chaos and commingled personal and state funds because some funds raised for charitable causes were transferred to his personal accounts due to bureaucratic obstacles. In the end, Purickis transferred more than 12 million Lithuanian auksinas to Lithuania.

== Return to diplomacy ==
In 1922, Purickis spent almost the entire year in Berlin trying to clear up the financial records. At the very end of the year, Prime Minister Ernestas Galvanauskas invited Purickis to participate in the Klaipėda Revolt of January 1923 and help Lithuanians capture the Klaipėda Region (Memel Territory), then a mandate of the League of Nations under temporary French administration. Purickis made declarations and explored possibilities of gaining Klaipėda Region was he was the Minister. Purickis was issued a fake passport under a Prussian Lithuanian-sounding last name Pėteraitis and helped rebels (mostly members of the Lithuanian Riflemen's Union) handle diplomatic aspects of the revolt – writing manifestos, negotiating with the French administration, organizing propaganda efforts, etc. Officially, he was the Lithuanian representative to the Directorate of the Klaipėda Region. The revolt was a success and Purickis was offered a job editing Lithuanian newspapers in Klaipėda Region, but refused and returned to Berlin.

Purickis also helped Lithuania to negotiate trade deals with Germany (concluded on 1 June 1923) and Sweden (concluded on 17 February 1924). In March 1925, Purickis was sent as a special envoy to the Vatican to protest the Concordat with Poland. He brought a sternly worded diplomatic note, and managed to deliver it on 3 April 1925 leading to the deterioration of the Holy See–Lithuania relations.

In early 1926, Purickis returned to the Ministry of Foreign Affairs as director of the newly created Economics Department. It was established to conduct trade negotiations with Latvia, Germany, Soviet Union, France, and other countries. Purickis also dealt with a complaint of the Parliament of the Klaipėda Region to the League of Nations regarding the division of tax revenue and helped negotiate the Soviet–Lithuanian Non-Aggression Pact. In 1926, Purickis submitted a request to be defrocked but it was granted only in June 1929. On 20 December 1926, during trade negotiations in Moscow, Purickis married Elena Skriabina, a Ukrainian lady of Eastern Orthodox faith born in 1900, in a civil ceremony. The trade deal with the Soviet Union was concluded only in 1928.

After the coup d'état in December 1926, Purickis was promoted to director of the Law–Administrative Department of the Ministry of Foreign Affairs. When the Lithuanian Christian Democratic Party decided to withdraw from the government on 15 May 1927, Purickis followed suit and resigned. It meant his retirement from politics and diplomacy.

== Journalism and public work ==
=== Writer and editor ===
Purickis began writing articles to the Lithuanian press, mainly the official daily Lietuva, after leaving the Ministry of Foreign Affairs in December 1921. Many of these were insightful analytical articles of economic and geopolitical developments and their effects on Lithuania. He used pen name Vygandas to avoid personal attacks. When Lietuva editor Kazimieras Jokantas became the Minister of Education in the cabinet of Vytautas Petrulis in January 1925, Purickis was invited to become the new editor of Lietuva. He improved the newspaper by bolstering its international coverage as well as creating a new dedicated section for articles on economy and an 8-page illustrated supplement on domestic and foreign culture and politics. As editor, Purickis clashed with his political opponents, particularly with Antanas Smetona and Augustinas Voldemaras. Purickis was replaced as the editor by Pranas Dailidė after the May 1926 elections to the Third Seimas of Lithuania in which the Christian Democratic Party lost its parliamentary majority.

In 1930, he became editor of Tautos ūkis, a new monthly magazine devoted to economy. Purickis published high quality, almost academic, articles. He was the editor at the time of the Great Depression and worsening trade relations between Lithuania and Germany (the largest importer of Lithuanian goods). He joined the Society for the Economic Studies and initiated economists' Fridays, a monthly meeting for discussions and debates. At his time, his political views shifted away from the Lithuanian Christian Democratic Party and became less antagonistic towards the ruling Lithuanian Nationalist Union.

Purickis wrote numerous articles to various other Lithuanian periodicals, including Lietuvos aidas, Trimitas, Vairas, Mūsų Vilnius, Mūsų rytojus, Policija, using many different pen names. In total, researchers Aldona Gaigalaitė and Jūratė Žeimantienė listed 1189 articles, brochures, booklets published by Purickis in his bibliography published in 2004. However, this list is incomplete as it is missing articles published in non-Lithuanian press during World War I. Further, many articles published in Lithuania were unsigned or signed only with ambiguous initials – such as about 140 editorials published in Lietuvos aidas in a 10-month period – and therefore not included in the list. Purickis wrote articles on various topics – official speeches and documents, memoirs, editorials, open letters to defend his name, analytical articles of economic and diplomatic affairs, opinion pieces on Lithuania's foreign policy or social issues (e.g. women's role in family), etc.

=== Journalists' Union ===
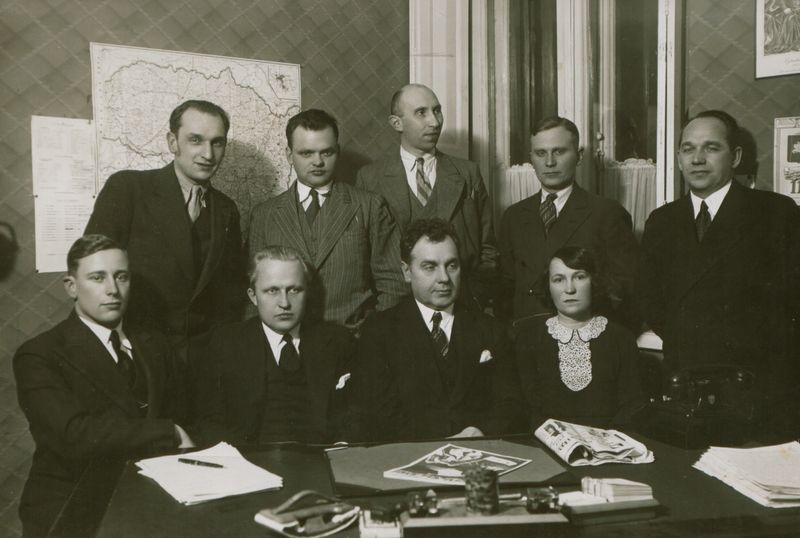
Board of the Lithuanian Journalists' Union around 1932. Purickis sits third from the left.

In fall 1925, Purickis was elected as chairman of the board of the Lithuanian Union of Writers and Journalists. In 1929, when the union had 71 members, it was decided to split it into the separate Lithuanian Writers' Union and the Lithuanian Journalists' Union. Purickis became chairman of the new journalists' union and chaired it until his death. During its founding meeting in April 1929, the union declared that it is a professional association that unites journalists regardless of political or religious views. It grew to 101 members in 1932 and 141 members in 1936, and became a member of the International Federation of Journalists. During the last two years, Purickis organized 58 official union meetings and 25 monthly journalists' Thursdays and strictly enforced attendance among the members of the union. In addition, the union organized various events, such as the 100th anniversary celebration of the first Lithuanian periodical Nusidavimai apie evangelijos prasiplatinimą tarp žydų ir pagonių in 1932, annual fundraising balls, educational courses in journalism (at the time, there were no specialized schools or university classes in Lithuania), the first journalist congress in summer 1933.

The union proposed to create a special pension fund for journalists because many of them worked as independent contractors and were not entitled to any of the state social guarantees. The union also pursued discounts for journalists, such as for public transport tickets, telephone service, theater admission. Purickis particularly cared to increase international cooperation. Together with Edvardas Turauskas, director of the Lithuanian news agency ELTA, he worked to create the Baltic Press Entente between Lithuanian, Latvian, and Estonian journalists in 1931. During Purickis' tenure, the entente organized three meetings in which journalists discussed cooperation, information exchange, and coordination of political views (this was particularly important for Lithuania as Latvian press often republished anti-Lithuanian texts from Polish periodicals). The Journalists' Union also searched for contacts with journalists in Finland (mostly via writer and diplomat Ignas Šeinius), Czechoslovakia (which had similar anti-Polish foreign policy due to the unresolved Polish–Czechoslovak border conflicts), Soviet Union (which was visited by a large group of Lithuanian journalists in 1934), Belgium, United States. Three of Purickis' ideas – publishing a journal on journalism, establishing a disciplinary commission, and building a vacation retreat in Giruliai near Klaipėda – were completed and implemented already after his death.

=== Other societies and death ===
Purickis was a member or a board member of many different societies. Many of these organizations related to international cooperation. He was treasurer of the Society for the Lithuanian–Jewish Rapprochement and Cultural Collaboration (established in July 1928; other board members included Mykolas Biržiška, Vincas Krėvė-Mickevičius, Leyb Gorfinkel, Jacob Robinson), vice-chairman of the Lithuanian–Ukrainian Society (established in November 1927; other board members included Mykolas Biržiška, Rapolas Skipitis), secretary or vice-chairman of the Lithuanian–German Society, board member of the Lithuanian–Estonian Society, member of the Lithuanian–Swedish Society, founding member of the Lithuanian Paneuropean Union (established in September 1933; other members included Michał Pius Römer, Jonas Vileišis). He was also vice-chairman of the League for the Liberation of Vilnius, a member of Lithuanian Riflemen's Union, Society for the Support of Lithuanians Abroad (organized by Rapolas Skipitis in February 1932), board member of the Lithuanian Homeowners' Association (organized in 1932). Purickis was not known as an orator and avoided public speaking delivering speeches or lectures only on special occasions.

Purickis died suddenly of a heart attack at about 4 am on 25 October 1934. The funeral was an official affair organized by the Lithuanian Journalists' Union and broadcast on the radio. The League for the Liberation of Vilnius announced a seven-day mourning period while the Lithuanian Riflemen's Union provided an honor guard. The Catholic church, however, refused to allow Purickis to be buried in a Catholic cemetery. Povilas Jakubėnas of the Lithuanian Evangelical Reformed Church agreed to perform funeral services and Purickis was buried in the Evangelical Cemetery in Kaunas (present-day Ramybė Park).

== Bibliography ==
- Čepėnas, Pranas (1986). Naujųjų laikų Lietuvos istorija (in Lithuanian). Vol. II. Chicago: Dr. Griniaus fondas. ISBN 5-89957-012-1.
- Gaigalaitė, Aldona; Žeimantienė, Jūratė (2004). Juozas Purickis-Vygandas (in Lithuanian). Vilnius: Vilniaus knyga. ISBN 9955-490-27-6.
- Gailius, Bernardas (2003). "Sacharino Byla". Naujasis Židinys-Aidai (in Lithuanian). 7–8. ISSN 1392-6845.
- Kasparavičius, Algimantas (2008). Tarp politikos ir diplomatijos: Šventasis Sostas ir Lietuvos Respublika (in Lithuanian). Lietuvos istorijos instituto leidykla. ISBN 978-9955-847-03-8.
- Lukšas, Aras (19 April 2013). "Diplomatas, visuomenininkas, kūrėjas" (in Lithuanian). Lietuvos žinios. Archived from the original on 26 November 2018.
- Merkelis, Aleksandras (1989) [1934]. Juozas Tumas Vaižgantas (in Lithuanian) (3rd ed.). Vilnius: Vaga. ISBN 5-415-00658-3.
- Merkys, Vytautas (1994). Knygnešių laikai 1864–1904 (in Lithuanian). Vilnius: Valstybinis leidybos centras. ISBN 9986-09-018-0.
- Mingėla, Vladas (April 1957). "Lietuvos plunksnos darbininkai". Aidai (in Lithuanian). 4 (99). ISSN 0002-208X.
- Pukienė, Vida (2013). Prelatas Konstantinas Olšauskas: visuomenės veikėjo tragedija (PDF). Edukologija. ISBN 978-9955-20-884-6. Archived from the original (PDF) on 2018-08-11.
- Raišytė-Daukantienė, Aušra (2003). "Lietuvos Respublikos tarptautinių sutarčių, sudarytų 1918-1940 m., skelbimo problema" (PDF). Jurisprudencija (in Lithuanian). 48 (40). ISSN 1392-6195. Archived from the original (PDF) on 2018-11-14.
- Skirius, Juozas (1999). "B. K. Balučio atsiminimai apie "Sacharino bylą"" (PDF). Istorija. Mokslo darbai (in Lithuanian). 39. ISSN 1392-0456.
- Anušauskas, Arvydas; Sviderskytė, Gražina (2008). XX amžiaus slaptieji archyvai: dvylika istorijos detektyvų (in Lithuanian). Versus aureus. ISBN 978-9955-34-118-5.
