= Petras Leonas =

Lithuanian attorney and politician

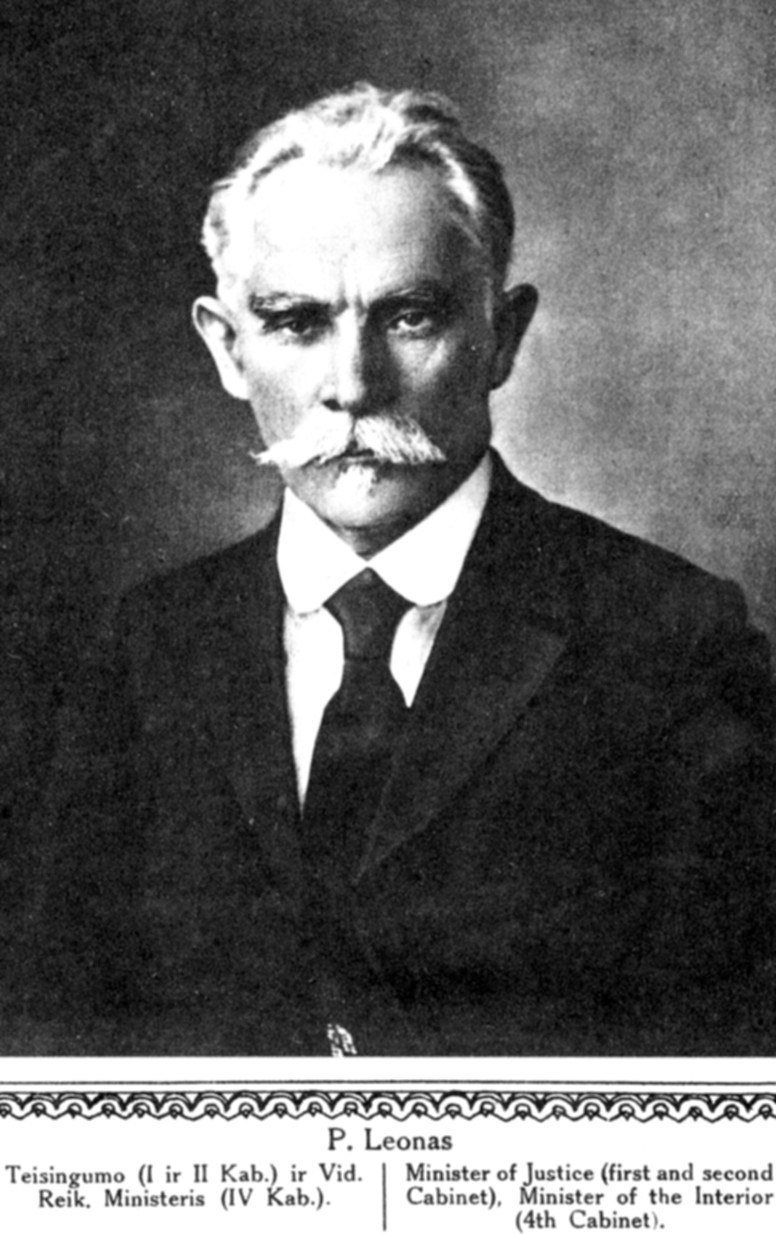
- Leonas in Lithuania Album published in 1921

Member of the State Duma of the Russian Empire

2nd convocation
- In office 20 February 1907 – 2 June 1907
- Constituency: Suwałki Governorate

Minister of Justice
- In office 11 November 1918 – 5 March 1919
- Prime Minister: Augustinas Voldemaras; Mykolas Sleževičius
- Preceded by: None
- Succeeded by: Liudas Noreika

Minister of Internal Affairs
- In office 12 April 1919 – 2 October 1919
- Prime Minister: Mykolas Sleževičius
- Preceded by: Antanas Merkys
- Succeeded by: Eliziejus Draugelis

Personal details
- Born: Petras Leonavičius; 16 November 1864 Leskava, Suwałki Governorate, Congress Poland
- Died: 12 May 1938 (aged 73) Kaunas, Lithuania
- Resting place: Petrašiūnai Cemetery
- Party: Farmers' Party
- Children: One daughter, four sons
- Relatives: Son-in-law Steponas Kairys; Nephew Silvestras Leonas
- Education: Imperial Moscow University

Petras Leonas (1864–1938) was a Lithuanian attorney and politician, the first Minister of Justice of the newly independent Lithuania in 1918.

After graduating from the Imperial Moscow University in 1889, Leonas held a government job at various courts in Suwałki and Uzbekistan. He was fired after supporting the Constitutional Democratic Party (Kadets) during the Russian Revolution of 1905. He returned to Lithuania and took up private law practice, which he had for 32 years. In 1907, he was elected to the second short-lived State Duma of the Russian Empire. During World War I, Leonas retreated to Russia and was deputy chairman of the Lithuanian Society for the Relief of War Sufferers. In March 1917, he was one of the founders of the Democratic National Freedom League. He returned to newly independent Lithuania in 1918 and began working on drafting some of the fundamental legislation. He became the first Minister of Justice in November 1918 and the fourth Minister of Internal Affairs in April 1919. He worked to organize judicial system and establish local municipal institutions in the chaotic post-war years. He retired from active politics in October 1919, but continued to consult the Lithuanian government on major pieces of legislation. Leonas became a professor and dean of the law faculty at the University of Lithuania.

== Early life ==
Leonas, the youngest of 11 children, was born on 16 November 1864 in Leskava near Gudeliai, Suwałki Governorate, to a family of Lithuanian farmers. After studying at primary schools in Šunskai, he went on to study at the Marijampolė Gymnasium which he graduated in 1884 with a silver medal. With financial help from his eldest brother priest Silvestras Leonavičius, Leonas continued his studies at the law faculty of the Imperial Moscow University. He graduated in 1889 as a Candidate of Sciences. As a university student, Leonas joined Lithuanian cultural life by leading a secret society of Lithuanian students that traced its roots to 1860 (there were about 50 Lithuanian students in Moscow at the time). His first articles were published in Lietuviškasis balsas in 1887. He assisted in organizing the publication of Šviesa and Varpas. Over the following decades, Leonas contributed articles to numerous Lithuanian periodicals, including Ūkininkas, Lietuvos ūkininkas, Vilniaus žinios, Viltis, Lietuvos žinios, Aušrinė, Šaltinis. In 1933–1938, he was the responsible editor of the Kultūra magazine. His bibliography numbers 165 items.

After the graduation, Leonas became a court clerk (judge candidate) in the Suwałki district court. Due to Russification policies, as a Roman Catholic, he could not get a government job in Lithuania. In 1892, he was transferred to Uzbekistan. He worked as a court interrogator in Tashkent, as justice of the peace and assistant prosecutor in Samarkand, and district judge in Margilan. During the Russian Revolution of 1905, he supported the Constitutional Democratic Party (Kadets) and was dismissed from his government job. He returned to Lithuania in September 1906 taking up private attorney practice in Kaunas and joining Lithuanian cultural life. He became chairman (1908–1914) of the cultural Daina Society that organized various music and theater performances, joined the Lithuanian Scientific Society, and helped organizing the First Congress of Lithuanian Women in 1907. Leonas was the only man on the congress' presidium.

== Political career ==
=== Russian Empire ===
In 1907, Leonas was elected to the second State Duma of the Russian Empire where he joined the Constitutional Democratic Party (Kadets). However, the Duma was dismissed in less than four months during the Coup of June 1907. In 1911, he hired Martynas Yčas as an assistant and became his mentor. With his help, Yčas was elected in the September 1912 elections to the State Duma and became an active and influential politician. With Yčas' help, Leonas was elected to the Central Committee of the Kadets. Leonas prepared a project of Lithuanian autonomy that together with Yčas presented to the Kadet leadership on 28 March 1916. Among other things, the project asked to attach the Suwałki Governorate to Lithuania. The Kadets rejected the project in May and Leonas resigned from the party in protest.

The outbreak of World War I presented an opportunity for Lithuanians to seek autonomy if not independence from the Russian Empire. To strengthen their political position, former and current Lithuanian members of the State Duma decided to establish the Representative Committee that would have more authority in representing the Lithuanians. However, the Committee soon disbanded as its chairman Leonas resigned in January 1915 in protest of Andrius Bulota's and Mykolas Januškevičius' withdrawals from the Lithuanian Society for the Relief of War Sufferers. The society was officially registered on 27 November and its founding meeting took place on 4 December 1914. Leonas was elected to its Central Committee. In mid 1915, during the Great Retreat of the Russian Imperial Army, Leonas evacuated from Lithuania to Russia where he continued to work on the war relief efforts becoming vice-chairman of the Lithuanian Society.

In March 1917, Leonas was one of the founders of the Democratic National Freedom League, a party of secular and liberal platform that is often known simply as Santara. As Santara's representative, he participated in the Petrograd Seimas in June 1917. Lithuanian activists hotly debated political future of Lithuania and split into two camps: those that envisioned fully independent Lithuania (mostly right-wing Party of National Progress and Christian Democrats) and those that believed that Lithuania should seek autonomy within Russia (mostly socialist-leaning parties, including Leonas).

=== Independent Lithuania ===
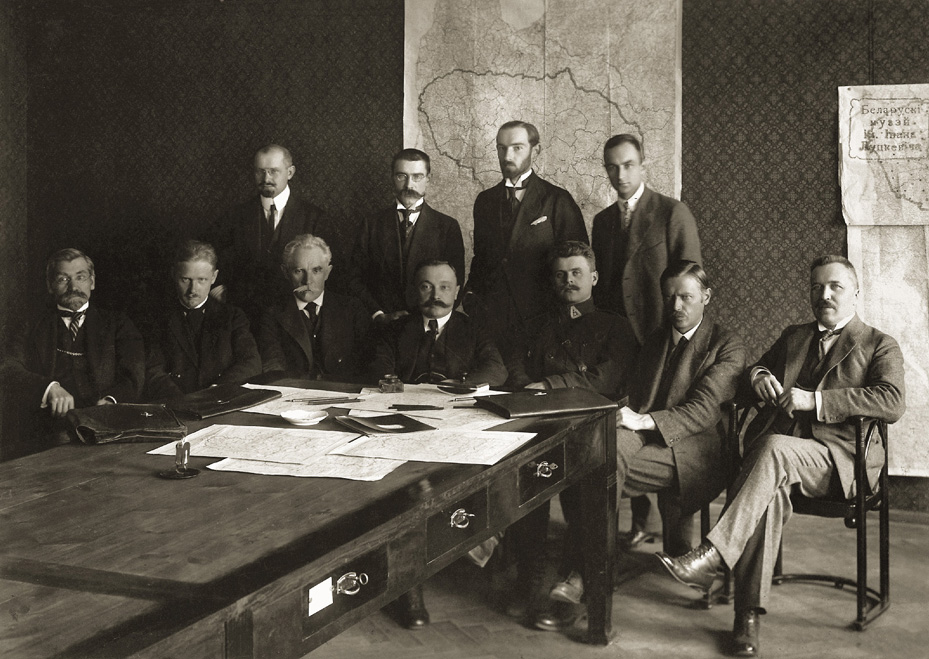
Fourth cabinet of ministers (Prime Minister Mykolas Sleževičius). Leonas sits third from left.

In May 1918, Leonas returned to Lithuania and joined the legal committee of the Council of Lithuania. On 11 November 1918, he became the first Minister of Justice in the cabinet of Augustinas Voldemaras. This cabinet was formed by members of the Party of National Progress and their allies; Leonas was the only representative of a different political party. At the start of the Lithuanian–Soviet War, Voldemaras and Antanas Smetona, chairman of the Council of Lithuania, departed for Germany. Voldemaras left Leonas as his deputy. Left without its leaders, the government resigned so that Mykolas Sleževičius could organize a new cabinet. Leonas remained Minister of Justice in the new cabinet. He refused to join the leftist cabinet of Pranas Dovydaitis, but returned to the fourth cabinet as Minister of Internal Affairs (April–October 1919).

As a minister, Leonas propagated the ideas of Rechtsstaat (rule of law) and worked to organize, standardize, and improve the judicial system and local municipal institutions. In December 1918, the government passed a temporary law on the judicial system which established the Lithuanian Tribunal (supreme court), district courts, and local courts (justice of the peace). Leonas worked to appoint judges and other court officials, but there was an acute lack of qualified personnel. This temporary law was replaced only in 1933. Already in early 1918, together with Tadas Petkevičius and Kostas Jablonskis, he began working on laws governing administrative divisions and local self-government. The law was passed on 10 October 1919, just a few days after his tenure as minister ended. On 29 April – 5 May 1919, Leonas held a conference of local representatives during which he emphasized the importance of state building from the ground up, explained the competence and jurisdiction of local institutions, discussed the relationship between the central and local government. Leonas spent a lot of effort in rooting out various self-declared parish committees. Leonas also worked on drafting other fundamental laws, including on elections, passports, societies and associations, press, but most of those became effective after his tenure.

== Academic career ==
Leonas retired from active politics in October 1919 and returned to private law practice (in total, he had a private practice for 32 years). In late 1920, Leonas organized the Council of Attorneys, the self-regulating national professional organization of attorneys in Lithuania, and was elected as its first chairman. At the time, Lithuania had 21 officially registered attorneys. He was elected chairman again in 1926 and was annually reelected until his death in 1938. Together with Antanas Tumėnas, he represented priest Konstantinas Olšauskas accused of murder during his high profile trial in October 1929.

While no longer a member of the government, Leonas still lent his legal expertise. He was chairman of the Lithuanian electoral commission that organized democratic elections to the Constituent Assembly and Seimas in 1920–1926. He also consulted on some of the major legislation, including the Constitution of Lithuania and land reform. As a respected authority on legal matters, Leonas was considered several times by the Seimas for President of Lithuania. In 1923–1926, he was a member of the council of the Lithuanian Riflemen's Union.

He also began teaching law at the Higher Courses that evolved into the University of Lithuania by 1922. His first lecture in February 1920 was on the basics of law. In 1921–1925, he also taught at special courses for municipal officers. At the new university, Leonas became dean of the law faculty. He lectured on the fundamentals of law, political economy, history of the philosophy of law, ethics. He published several well received textbooks based on his lecture notes. In 1932, during the 10th anniversary celebrations, Leonas received an honorary PhD from the university. In 1933, the Ministry of Education rejected Leonas' request to extend his university tenure beyond the retirement age of 65. The university found a loophole – Leonas was elected as an honorary professor and could continue to lecture albeit with no compensation. He retired from teaching in 1934, but returned in fall 1936 with a new course on sociology. The 400-page textbook, published already after Leonas' death, systematically analyzed the principles of sociology and became a pioneering work on sociology in Lithuania.

Leonas cared to support financially struggling students. In 1927, he initiated the Jonas Basanavičius Fund attached to the Council of Attorneys. The fund, about 28,000 litas, spent its earnings on scholarships to students. In 1931, from his personal funds, he established a 1,000 litas prize for student scientific work. Employees of the law faculty followed suit and established two prizes (500 litas each) for best paper. Knowing his preferences, the university spent his retirement dinner funds on scholarships. Leonas died suddenly on 12 May 1938. Instead of buying flowers for his funeral, mourners were asked to donate the money to struggling students and victims of a large fire in Palanga.

In 1924, Leonas constructed a two-floor (engineer Edmundas Alfonsas Frykas) home in Kaunas. The third floor and the attic were added in 1929 and the facade acquired Art Deco features. The house was divided into apartments where Leonas and his son-in-law Steponas Kairys lived; other apartments were rented out.
