= Kazys Skučas =

Lithuanian politician and general

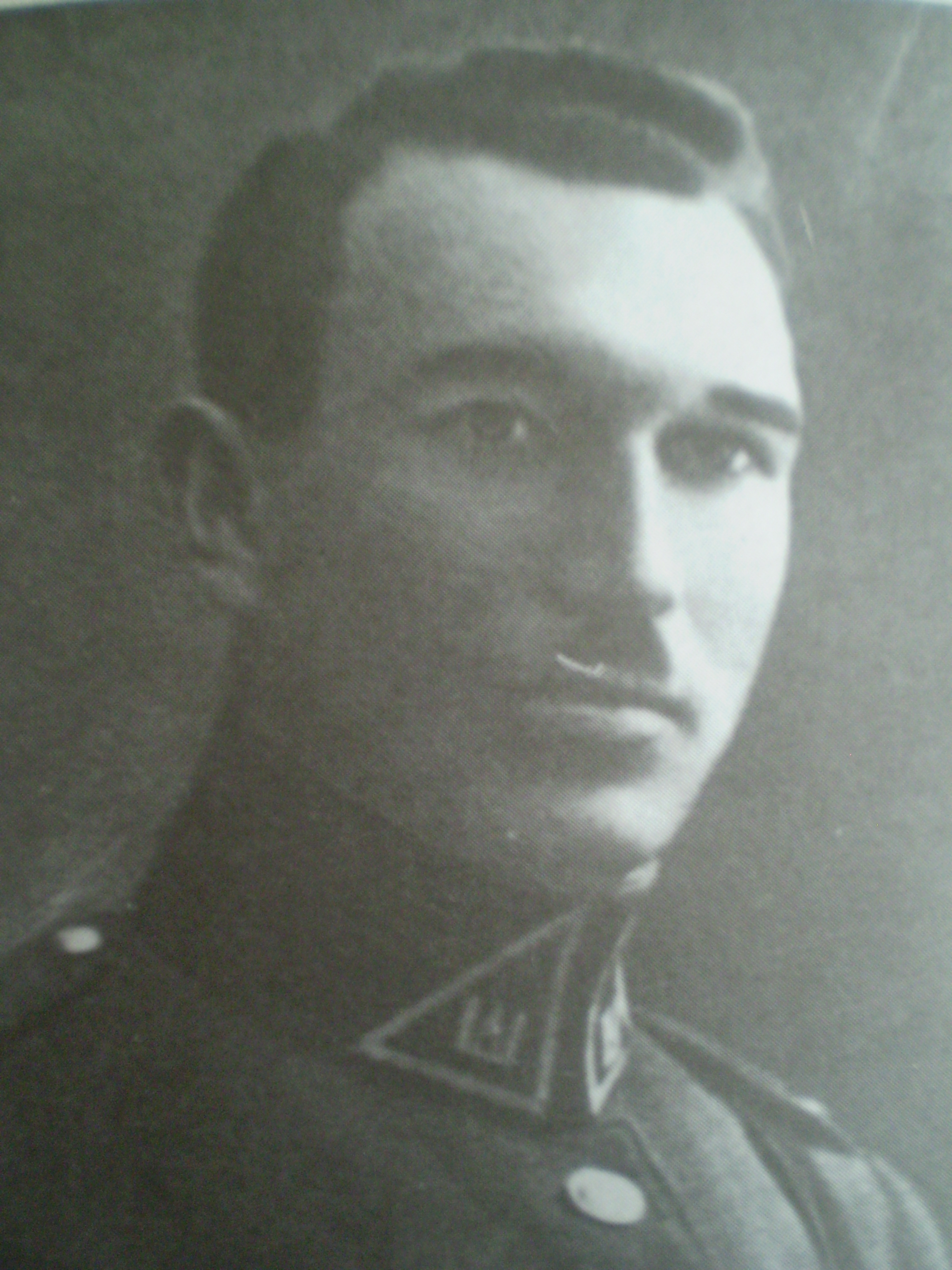
Kazys Skučas with the Lithuanian Armed Forces uniform

Kazys Skučas (3 March 1894 in Mauručiai, Marijampolė district – 30 July 1941 in the Butyrka prison) was a Lithuanian politician and General of the Lithuanian Army. Skučas was the last Minister of the Interior of independent Lithuania. He was a target of anti-Lithuanian Soviet propaganda in the days leading to the 1940 Soviet ultimatum and occupation of Lithuania. Right after the Red Army invaded Lithuania on 15 June 1940, Skučas was directed to leave the country by the then-President Antanas Smetona but was arrested at the border several days later by the then acting Lithuanian President Antanas Merkys and handed over to the Russians, transported to Moscow, and executed in 1941.

== Early life and career ==
After graduation from the Veiveriai Pedagogical Seminary in 1912, Skučas worked as a teacher for a few years. He then enrolled to the Pedagogical Institute of Petrograd. However, in 1915 he was drafted into the Imperial Russian Army and served in the Romanian front with the 249th Infantry Regiment. In 1918 he returned to Lithuania and volunteered for the Lithuanian Army, where he began by organized police forces in Daugai. Skučas steadily rose through the ranks and in March 1928 he became the commander of the 2nd Infantry Division and the Kaunas garrison.

From 1934 to 1938, Skučas worked as a military attaché in Russia. After his return, he was promoted to brigadier general, but he soon retired. He then joined the 20th cabinet (Prime Minister Jonas Černius) as the Minister of the Interior. Formed after the government crisis in the aftermath of the 1939 German ultimatum to Lithuania, the 20th cabinet included four generals. Skučas retained his position when Prime Minister Antanas Merkys formed the 21st cabinet in fall 1939.

== Soviet persecution ==
In spring 1940, the Soviet Union heightened its anti-Lithuanian rhetoric and increased diplomatic pressure. The Lithuanian government was accused of kidnapping, torturing, and interrogating two Russian soldiers, stationed in Lithuania according to the Soviet–Lithuanian Mutual Assistance Treaty of 1939. Skučas and Director of the State Security Department Augustinas Povilaitis were singled out as the main perpetrators of the provocations. Despite Lithuanian repeated pledges to fully investigate the incident, the Soviets kept pressing the charges. Just before receiving the Soviet ultimatum, Lithuanian government decided that Skučas should resign. However, it was not enough and the Lithuanians were presented with the ultimatum, listing three demands. The first demand was to put Skučas and Povilaitis on trial.

After Lithuania was occupied by the Soviet Union on 15 June 1940, Skučas and Povilaitis were arrested, by police sent by Antanas Merkys, near the Lithuanian border with Nazi Germany. For a time they were held in the Kaunas Prison, but then transported to the Butyrka prison in Moscow. After a show trial, Skučas was sentenced to death and executed in July 1941 aged 47. For a long time very little was known about Skučas' trial or execution. Only in 1989 his case documents were made public. They showed that, despite lack of evidence, Skučas was accused not only of provocations against the Russian soldiers, but also of espionage during the years as military attaché and "brutal actions against the socialist revolution."

Political offices
Preceded by Silvestras Leonas	Minister of the Interior; 1939–1940	Succeeded by Office Abolished (Soviet Occupation)
