= Kaunas Prison =

Prison in Kaunas, Lithuania

Coordinates: 54°53′42″N 23°54′59″E

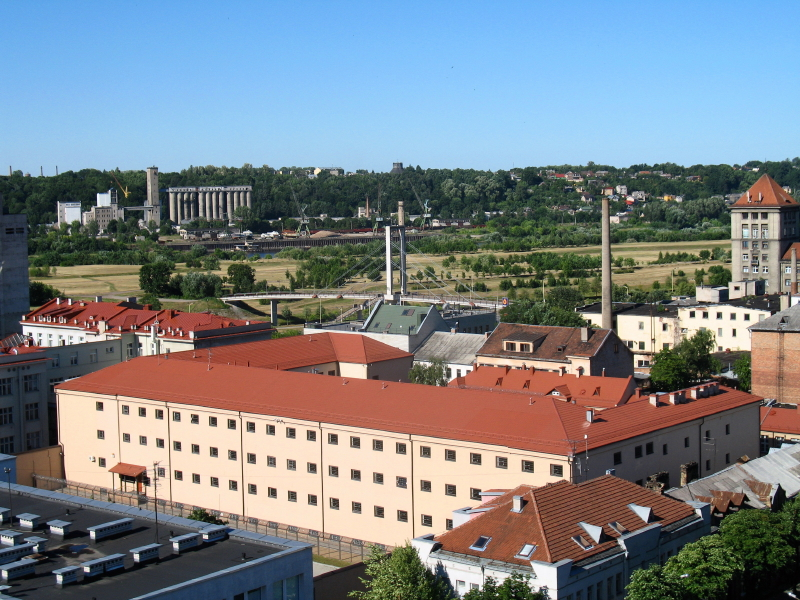
Kaunas Prison

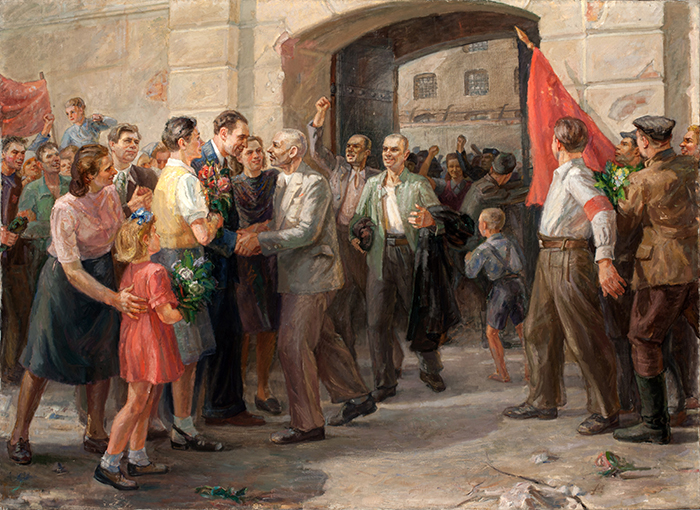
Release of political prisoners from the prison in Kaunas. Painting of Moshe Rosenthalis

Kaunas Prison (Lithuanian: Kauno tardymo izoliatorius) is a prison in the center of Kaunas, second largest city of Lithuania. As of 2007, it houses approximately 300 prisoners and employs around 230 prison guards. Most prisoners are there under temporary arrest awaiting court decisions or transfers to other detention facilities.

== History ==
The Kaunas Prison was completed in 1864, just after the January Uprising during the times of the Russian Empire. At the time it was one of the most modern prisons in the whole region. It had space for 300 prisoners, a chapel, administrative-household premises, and apartments for employees were planned. Later, the number of prisoners that could be housed grew to 550. Kaunas Prison could be seen far from Kaunas center and aroused terror in everybody. Sometimes it was even called the “Kaunas Bastille.” During the period of the 1905 Revolution, the prison was overcrowded with political prisoners. A branch of Kaunas Prison was established in the Ninth Fort of Kaunas Fortress in 1924.

During World War II, in June 1941, during the German invasion of the Soviet Union, the majority of the convicts in Kaunas Prison were Jewish. Most of them were executed at Ninth Fort. Most of the prisoners kept in Kaunas Prison were under interrogation. Due to lack of food or medical care, the exhausting work and the beatings, the prisoner mortality rate was rather high. Kaunas Prison was completely liquidated in 1960. After the reconstruction, in the place of the former Kaunas Prison the scientific research center of Kaunas Polytechnic Institute was settled.

Due to the lack of spaces for individuals under temporary arrest to await court decisions and transfers to other detention sites, Kaunas Remand Prison was to be reconstructed under the resolution adopted by the Government of Lithuania in 1993. After the reconstruction, Kaunas Remand Prison opened and is the most modern school in Lithuania.

== Notable prisoners ==
- Michał Elwiro Andriolli, Polish painter and architect
- Leonas Bistras, former Prime Minister of Lithuania
- Felix Dzerzhinsky, Soviet statesman and founder of the Cheka
- Antanas Mackevičius, Lithuanian priest and a leader of the January Uprising
- Vytautas Petrulis, former Prime Minister of Lithuania
- Augustinas Povilaitis, captain of the Lithuanian Army and director of the State Security Department
- Kazys Skučas, Lithuanian politician and general of the Lithuanian Army
- Antanas Sniečkus, Lithuanian communist leader
