= Augustinas Povilaitis =

Lithuanian Army officer (1900–1941)

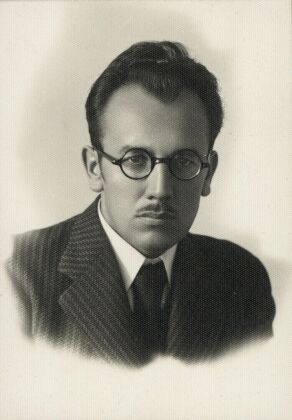
- Augustinas Povilaitis in 1933
- Born: 24 February 1900; Pašventys, Russian Empire
- Died: 12 July 1941 (aged 41); Moscow, Soviet Union
- Cause of death: Execution by the Soviet Union
- Education: Vytautas Magnus University
- Occupations: Military officer, security police officer

Augustinas Povilaitis (24 February 1900 – 12 July 1941) was a captain of the Lithuanian Army and Director of the State Security Department of Lithuania. Together with Minister of the Interior Kazys Skučas, Povilaitis was a target of anti-Lithuanian Soviet propaganda in the days leading to the 1940 Soviet ultimatum and occupation of Lithuania. Directly after the Red Army invaded Lithuania on 15 June 1940, Povilaitis was arrested and transported to Moscow. He was executed in 1941. In 2006 he was awarded the Order of the Cross of Vytis.

== Early life and career ==
In 1919, Povilaitis volunteered for the Lithuanian Army and participated in the Lithuanian Wars of Independence with the Bermontians. In the army he rose to the rank of a captain. From 1920 to 1931 he worked as on officer in the security and criminal police. As a volunteer in the army, Povilaitis received 15 hectares (37 acres) of land in Giedriai village and established a farm. In 1931 he was appointed chief of the security police. As an extramural student, he obtained a high school diploma and enrolled to the Vytautas Magnus University in 1933. He graduated in 1939 with a degree in economics. In 1934, Povilaitis was promoted to the Director of the State Security Department. In this capacity he enforced the ban against the Communist Party of Lithuania, which made him unpopular with the Soviet Union. Povilaitis contributed articles to several newspaper and journals, including Lietuvos aidas, Vairas and Ūkininko patarėjas.

== Soviet persecution ==
In spring 1940, the Soviet Union heightened its anti-Lithuanian rhetoric and increased diplomatic pressure. The Lithuanian government was accused of kidnapping, torturing, and interrogating two Russian soldiers, stationed in Lithuania under the Soviet–Lithuanian Mutual Assistance Treaty of 1939. Povilaitis and Minister of the Interior Kazys Skučas were singled out as the main perpetrators of the provocations. Despite repeated Lithuanian pledges to fully investigate the incident, the Soviets kept pressing the charges. Just before receiving the Soviet ultimatum, Lithuanian government decided to dismiss Povilaitis. However, it was not enough and the Lithuanians were presented with the ultimatum, listing three demands.The first demand was to put Skučas and Povilaitis on trial.

After Lithuania was occupied by the Soviet Union on 15 June 1940, Skučas and Povilaitis were arrested near Povilaitis' birthplace close to the Lithuanian border with Nazi Germany. They were held for a time in Kaunas, then transported to a prison in Moscow. After a trial Povilaitis was sentenced to death and executed in July 1941. For a long time very little was known about his trial or execution. His family escaped abroad and thought that Povilaitis was alive and imprisoned in some Soviet gulag. In 1960 the soviets released bits of Povilaitis' interrogation protocols to prove that he conspired with Nazi Germany against the Soviet Union. According to the protocols, in February 1940 Povilaitis traveled to Berlin and discussed options for German protection, especially in case of aggression from the Soviets, with Werner Best. Reportedly Germans replied that they could establish a protectorate by September 1940. Some Soviet historians have used this evidence to justify the Soviet occupation, as protecting Lithuania from the Nazis.
