= Supreme Tribunal of Lithuania =

The Supreme Tribunal of Lithuania (Lithuanian: Lietuvos Vyriausiasis Tribunolas) was the highest court in interwar Lithuania. Officially established in December 1918, the court held its first proceedings in August 1919. Initially, it served as an appeals court for cases first decided by the district courts. Its competency was steadily expanded to encompass cases referred from the Army Court in July 1919, cassation cases from the justices of the peace in June 1921, cases from the Klaipėda Region (Memelland) in 1923, and certain functions of an administrative court. The judicial reform in 1933 created a new appeals court leaving the Supreme Tribunal with functions of a court of cassation and an administrative court. Its main task was to interpret and consistently apply the laws. The tribunal handled some controversial high-profile cases, including the case of Prime Minister Augustinas Voldemaras and corruption cases of Prime Minister Vytautas Petrulis and Minister of Foreign Affairs Juozas Purickis. The court was abolished and replaced by the Supreme Court of the Lithuanian SSR in September 1940. The tribunal was briefly resurrected during the German occupation of Lithuania.

Generally, the court proceedings were presided by a panel of three judges. The judges were nominated by the Minister of Justice and confirmed by the President of Lithuania. As the membership of the court grew very slowly (a third judge was added only in June 1921 and the fourth in July 1923) while the number of cases grew significantly, the court frequently invited district judges and even sworn attorneys to the bench. The practice was abolished by the reform in 1933 which set the number of tribunal judges at 15. The court was chaired by Antanas Kriščiukaitis (1918–1933) and Liudas Ciplijauskas (1934–1940). Other notable members included Michał Pius Römer and Silvestras Leonas.

== Establishment and liquidation ==
The Council of Lithuania declared independence of Lithuania in February 1918, but was unable to take control of the country due to the continued presence of German Ober Ost officials and military. After the Armistice of 11 November 1918, the Council adopted a temporary law on the court system in Lithuania on 28 November. After the temporary constitution, it was the second law to be adopted and was in effect until 1933. The law established a three-tier court system with the Supreme Tribunal based in Vilnius at the top. Antanas Kriščiukaitis was appointed as the chairman of the tribunal on 10 December and was supposed to take over the German courts on 15 December, but the plans were interrupted by the outbreak of the Lithuanian–Soviet War. The Lithuanian government evacuated from Vilnius to Kaunas. Kriščiukaitis remained in Vilnius until he was recalled to Kaunas in June 1919. The second judge, Augustinas Janulaitis, was appointed to the tribunal on 16 May. The court held its first proceeding on 2 August 1919.

After the Soviet occupation of Lithuania in June 1940, the tribunal was reduced to two members and officially liquidated on 26 September 1940 by a decree of the Council of People's Commissars. It was replaced by the Supreme Court of the Lithuanian SSR. After the German invasion of the Soviet Union in June 1941, the Provisional Government of Lithuania ordered reestablishment of the pre-Soviet court system. Liudas Ciplijauskas, former chairman of the tribunal, was ordered to resurrect the Supreme Tribunal on 4 July 1941. The tribunal with three judges (Ciplijauskas, Jonas Gudauskis, and Saliamonas Baltūsis) started its work, but it was effectively disbanded on 14 February 1942 when officials of the Reichskommissariat Ostland did not sanction its continued work (other Lithuanian courts were allowed to function).

== Competency ==
Initially, the tribunal was limited to acting as an appeals court for cases that were first decided by the district courts (the cases decided by justices of the peace and appealed to the district courts were not appealable to the tribunal). Due to difficult economic situation and lack of educated jurists, Lithuania did not have a separate court of cassation and it was hoped that since there is only one Supreme Tribunal for the entire country it could also handle the function of law interpretation. In July 1919, the tribunal became a court of cassation for cases referred from the Army Court (until 1928, some political cases from the Army Court could also be reviewed for the facts of the case). With the ongoing Lithuanian Wars of Independence (ended in November 1920) and the continued martial law (lifted only in November 1939), the Army Court was very active. In 1920–1929, the tribunal handled 854 cases from the Army Court (152 appeals and 702 cassations). In June 1921, the competency of the tribunal was expanded to act as a court of cassation for cases decided by the justices of the peace and appealed to the district courts.

After the Klaipėda Region (Memelland) was incorporated as an autonomous region of Lithuania in 1923, the tribunal was tasked with handling the cases from the region. However, they needed to be presided by a majority of judges who were selected from the Klaipėda magistrates and who received lifetime appointments from the President of Lithuania. The first such members were Friedrich Plümicke and Anton Hesse. Until 1933, when they were moved to Kaunas, proceedings related to the cases from the Klaipėda Region took place mostly in Klaipėda (Memel). Until 1932, the tribunal handled about 2,000 cases related to the region. The competency of the tribunal was further expanded by assigning certain functions to an administrative court. For example, it could hear complaints regarding the implementation of the land reform of 1922 or decrees of ministers or country governors related to municipal matters.

The judicial reform adopted in July 1933 created a new appeals court leaving the tribunal as the court of cassation for cases handled by the district courts, new appeals court, Army Court, and courts of the Klaipėda Region. In addition, the tribunal was tasked with the administrative and magistrate disciplinary cases from the Klaipėda Region, criminal cases that Seimas could bring against members of the government or the President, and cases that were specifically enumerated in other laws. By 1938, the number of such laws that assigned various administrative cases to the tribunal grew to about 60. After the reform in 1933, the tribunal was divided into three sections: criminal law, civil law, and Klaipėda Region. No separate section was established for the military cases, but their proceedings had to include a tribunal member specifically selected for a three-year term from the military judges. The Klaipėda section was closed when Lithuania lost the region after the German ultimatum of March 1939. Further, the reform officially recognized the general meetings of the tribunal's members. The meeting, which needed a quorum of at least two-thirds of all tribunal judges, could interpret and rule on laws that were inconsistently applied by various courts. It was also the only institution for resolving jurisdictional disputes. The issues could be brought up by the Minister of Justice or by the chairman of the tribunal; the tribunal judges could also initiate a general meeting if they felt that a previous case or decision needed to be overturned. The reform also established a disciplinary court for judges and a commission for judges' examination under the jurisdiction of the tribunal.

== Cases ==
Number of completed cases
Year	Civil	Criminal	Total
1920	23	150	173
1924	483	517	1,000
1928	1,247	1,453	2,700
1932	1,812	1,627	3,439
1936	1,347	840	2,187
1939	1,363	1,072	2,435

In the first post-war years, the court managed to complete relatively few cases a year as it lacked judges. Its workload continued to grow as its competencies were expanded. The number of cases stabilized after the separate appeals court was established in 1933. In 1927, about 6.5% of cases from Kaunas district were appealed to the Supreme Tribunal. The tribunal handled some controversial high-profile cases, including corruption cases of Prime Minister Vytautas Petrulis and Minister of Foreign Affairs Juozas Purickis, case of Prime Minister Augustinas Voldemaras (1932), as well as the murder charges against priest Konstantinas Olšauskas and slander charges against Jonas Šliūpas.

The tribunal had to deal with the fact that Lithuania inherited four different sets of laws that, unless replaced by a new law, continued to be in effect. For example, four different civil codes were in effect in Lithuania: Volume 10 of the Digest of Laws of the Russian Empire was in effect in most of Lithuania, the Napoleonic and other French laws in Suvalkija, the German Civil Code in the Klaipėda Region, and the Private Law of the Baltic Governorates in Palanga and small areas near Zarasai. Independent Lithuania did not manage to adopt a new civil or criminal code. Since old Russians laws were still in effect in most of Lithuania, the decisions and rulings of the Russian Governing Senate were widely cited and used in practice even though the Lithuanian tribunal ruled in 1923 that such decisions were equal to a personal opinion of a jurist.

In July 1920, the tribunal ruled that all legal proceedings need to be conducted in the Lithuanian language. It elicited a number of complaints from Russian-speaking attorneys and judges. Later, an exception was made for cases from the Klaipėda Region that could also be conducted in German. There was no official publication of the court's decisions. Chairman Kriščiukaitis published summary reviews of the proceedings in journal Teisė (Law) that he edited. He edited 23 issues of Teisė and prepared 18 reviews. After his death in 1933, the reviews ceased. Several unofficial collections of tribunal's decisions were published by various authors. The judicial reform in 1933 mandated that the proceedings were published. They were published as a supplement to Teisė. In total, Teisė published about half of the tribunal's decisions and rulings – approximately 5,000 documents: 1,500 criminal cases, 2,800 civil cases, and 450 resolutions of the tribunal's general meetings.

== Membership ==
The judges were nominated by the Minister of Justice and confirmed by the President of Lithuania. The tribunal's proceedings were supposed to be presided by three judges. The first two members, chairman Antanas Kriščiukaitis and Augustinas Janulaitis, were appointed in December 1918 and May 1919. The tribunal had to invite judges from district courts to attend the proceedings until the third member, Michał Pius Römer, was appointed in June 1921. The fourth judge was added in July 1923, two special judges were added in 1924 to handle cases related to the Klaipėda Region, and three judges were added in 1926. However, the workload increased faster than the number of tribunal judges – the number of cases per judge grew tenfold from 65 in 1920 to 659 in 1925, while the number of completed cases declined from 88% to 62% in the same period. Therefore, the court continued to invite district judges and even sworn attorneys to the bench. The practice was abolished during the reforms of 1933.

The tribunal valued its independence and resisted political appointments. In 1922, Minister of Justice Vincas Karoblis wanted to appoint the fourth judge, but members of the tribunal protested and threatened to resign if the minister pushed his candidate through. In 1925, Minister Antanas Tumėnas reassigned Janulaitis from the tribunal to the district count in Panevėžys. Tumėnas was served an interpellation and was questioned why he made the appointments without Janulaitis' request or consent as dictated by the Russian laws that Lithuania inherited.

By 1933, the tribunal had 16 judges appointed; during the same time, four were reassigned or resigned. The reforms of 1933 set the number of tribunal members to 15, which was increased to 17 in 1938. After the death of Kriščiukaitis in October 1933, Liudas Ciplijauskas became the new chairman. The civil section was headed by Motiejus Čepas and Simanas Petrauskas, the criminal section was headed by Juozas Brazaitis, the Klaipėda section was headed by Jonas Staškevičius, Martynas Bruzdeilinas, and Jonas Danauskas. The military judges were Vladas Mieželis and Julius Matulevičius. In early 1940, the tribunal had 16 judges: Liudas Ciplijauskas, Simanas Petrauskas, Juozas Brazaitis, Petras Adomavičius, Saliamonas Baltūsis, J. Boreika, Martynas Brazdeilinas, Česlovas Butkys, Juozas Grigaitis, Silvestras Leonas, Mykolas Mataitis, Julius Matulevičius, Napoleonas Morkvėnas, Jonas Staškevičius, Aleksas Vaitonis, A. Vilčinskas.
