= Lietuva (daily) =

Lietuva (transl. Lithuania) was a Lithuanian-language daily newspaper published in Kaunas from 11 January 1919 to 31 January 1928. It was the official publication of the Lithuanian government. In this function, the newspaper replaced and was replaced by Lietuvos aidas. Its circulation was 18,000 copies in 1923.

== Supplements ==
The newspaper published several supplements, including:

- Sekmoji diena in 1920–1921 edited by Faustas Kirša
- Krivulė in 1925–1928 edited by Kazys Puida
- Iliustruotoji Lietuva in 1926–1928 edited by Zigmas Kuzmickis

== Editors ==
The newspaper was edited by:

- Albinas Rimka – 1919
- Vilius Gaigalaitis – 1919–1920
- Matas Bagdonas – 1921–1922 and 1927–1928
- Balys Sruoga – 1921–1923
- Mykolas Biržiška – 1923
- Kazimieras Jokantas – 1923–1925 and 1926–1927
- Juozas Purickis – 1925–1926
- Pranas Dailidė – 1926
- Mikas Bagdonas – 1926 and 1928
