= Lietuvos aidas =

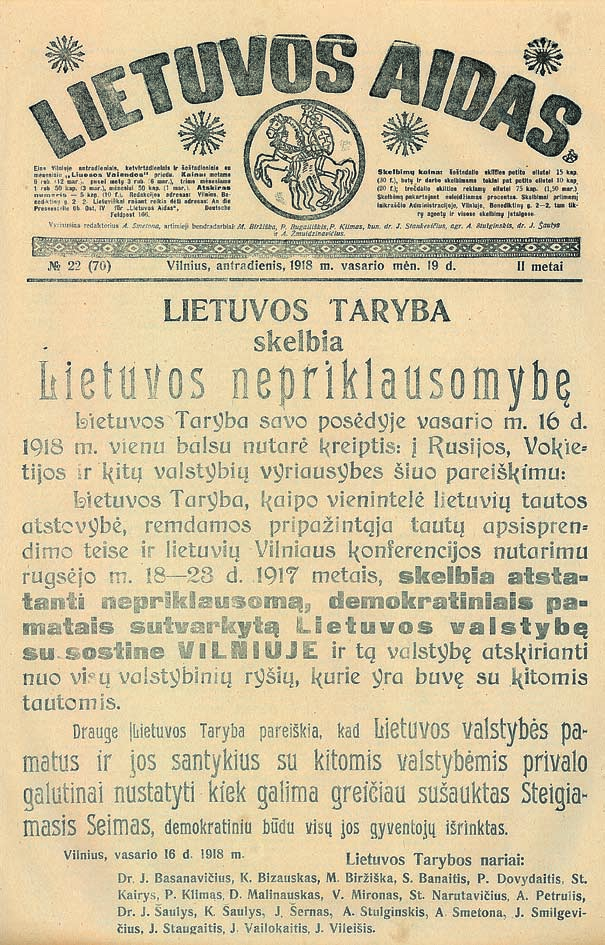
The front page of Lietuvos Aidas with the text of the Act of Independence of Lithuania. The bulk of the issue was confiscated by German authorities.

Lietuvos aidas (literally: Echo of Lithuania) is a daily newspaper in Lithuania. It was established on September 6, 1917, by Antanas Smetona, and became the semi-official voice of the newly formed Lithuanian government. When the government evacuated from Vilnius to the temporary capital, Kaunas, it ceased publication. The newspaper was revived in 1928 as the newspaper of the Lithuanian government and became the most popular newspaper in Lithuania. At its peak, it published three daily editions with combined circulation of 90,000 copies. World War II disrupted its publication. In 1990, after Lithuania declared independence from the Soviet Union, the newspaper once again became the official newspaper of the Supreme Council of the Republic of Lithuania. At the end of 1992, its circulation reached 103,000 copies. However, it was soon privatized and faced shrinking readership, financial difficulties, and other controversies. In April 2006, bankruptcy proceedings were initiated by the State Tax Inspectorate when its tax debts reached more than 4 million litas. The company was liquidated in 2015, but the newspaper continues to be published by a non-profit organization (viešoji įstaiga).

== History ==
=== 1917–1918 ===
The newspaper was established on September 6, 1917, when Lithuania was occupied by the German Empire. At the time it was the only Lithuanian-language newspaper in Vilnius (Lietuvos ūkininkas was discontinued at the start of the war). The German authorities loosened their control and granted some rights to the local population as World War I drew to a close. An openly pursued goal of annexation gave way to a more guarded policy after Germany perceived that a public relations backlash might occur: the Central Powers realized that the Allies could use this annexation in their propaganda and in the upcoming peace negotiations. During this time, Lithuanians assembled the Vilnius Conference and elected the 20-member Council of Lithuania, which was entrusted with the declaration of Lithuania's independence.

When Antanas Smetona, the newspaper's founder, became the chairman of the council, Lietuvos aidas became the official newspaper of the Council on September 21, 1917. It was important for the council to inform the Lithuanian people about its struggles and progress and developments on the war front, and to report other political news. Among its goals was the unification of all Lithuanians, irrespective of their political beliefs, in order to declare and establish an independent Lithuania. The newspaper was censored by the Germans and was required to issue German translations. The German issue was titled Litauische Echo. At first the newspaper was published three times a week; after October 1, 1918, it was published daily, except for Mondays. The circulation in 1918 reached some 20,000 copies.

The newspaper usually consisted of about four to six pages. It published official declarations, decisions, and similar documents. Among the most famous issues is that of February 19, 1918, when the entire front page was dedicated to the Act of Independence of Lithuania. Although the majority of that issue was confiscated, the newspaper's editor, Petras Klimas, succeeding in hiding about 60 copies. In addition to political news, Lietuvos aidas also published poems and other literary works. It featured a special supplement, Liuosoji valanda (The Free Hour), dedicated to art. Another supplement, Mūsų ūkis (Our Farm), published articles on farming and agriculture.

Antanas Smetona remained as the editor in chief, but the actual editing was performed by Petras Klimas, Liudas Noreika, and others. Its authors included Mykolas Biržiška, Petras Klimas, Aleksandras Stulginskis, Jurgis Šaulys, Antanas Žmuidzinavičius, Juozas Tumas-Vaižgantas, Juozas Tūbelis. As Bolshevik forces took over Vilnius, the government had to abandon the city and the newspaper discontinued its operations on December 31, 1918, after publishing 214 issues. After the interim government was established in Kaunas, Lietuvos aidas was replaced by Lietuva (Lithuania) as the official newspaper of the Lithuanian government.

=== 1928–1940 ===
Lietuvos aidas was revived on February 1, 1928. It replaced Lietuva, the newspaper of the Lithuanian government, and Lietuvis, the newspaper of the Lithuanian Nationalist Union. After October 29, 1935, the paper published two editions daily (at 6 a.m. and at 1 p.m.), and from May 9, 1939, until the end of that year it published three daily editions (called Rytinis Lietuvos aidas, Lietuvos aidas, and Vakarinis Lietuvos aidas). These three editions were not merely re-prints or updates, but consisted of completely new material. The issues consisted of 14 to 16 pages. In 1939, the newspaper was the largest newspaper in Lithuania and its daily circulation reached 90,000 copies. The last issue, number 5546, was published on July 16, 1940, a month after the Soviet Union occupied Lithuania. Lietuvos aidas was replaced by the communists Darbo Lietuva (Working Lithuania).

The chief editors were appointed by President Antanas Smetona and his Prime Minister. During this time, chief editors of Lietuvos aidas were Valentinas Gustainis (1928–1932), Ignas Šeinius (1933–1934), Vytautas Alantas (1934–1939), Aleksandras Merkelis (1939), Domas Cesevičius (1939), Tomas Bronius Dirmeikis (1939–1940).

=== Since 1990 ===
Lietuvos aidas was again resurrected in 1990 when Lithuania declared independence from the Soviet Union. The first new issue came out on May 8, 1990, during the economic blockade of Lithuania. Receiving support from Vytautas Landsbergis, it was recreated as the newspaper of the Supreme Council and the Council of Ministers of Lithuanian. It had 62,000 subscribers in 1991 and 56,000 subscribers in 1992. At the end of 1992, its circulation reached 103,000 copies. The newspaper reflected ideology of the Homeland Union. There were unrealized plans of merging Lietuvos aidas with the Russian-language Echo Litvy (previously Sovetskaya Litva). Few years later, Lietuvos aidas was privatized. The first editor was Saulius Stoma (until 1994). In October 1997, he received a five-year sentence for misappropriation of funds at Lietuvos aidas and served a seven-month sentence. Other editors included Saulius Šaltenis (1994–1996), Roma Grinbergienė (1997–1998), Jonas Vailionis (1998), and Rimantas Varnauskas (1998–2000).

By the end of 1999, the newspaper had accumulated more than 5 million litas of debt and its daily circulation decreased to 7,000 copies. In May 2000, controversial businessman Algirdas Pilvelis acquired the controlling share of the newspaper and became its editor. The newspaper caused a public scandal when some 50 openly anti-Semitic articles were published in fall 2000. Lietuvos aidas faced no real sanctions, but did soften its rhetoric. The scandal and other controversies alienated much of the readership: by September 2002, the circulation decreased to less than 5,000 copies and 2003 saw a 29.2% drop in subscriptions.

In December 2006, a new newspaper, with the same name and design, appeared as the original newspaper had failed to register its name. The new paper, published by an unknown company Adenita, employed several former employees of the original Lietuvos aidas. Pilvelis sued and obtained an injunction and the publication of the second Lietuvos aidas ceased in May 2007.

In April 2006, bankruptcy proceedings were initiated by the State Tax Inspectorate when its tax debts reached more than 4 million litas. After the prolonged litigation, its main asset – former headquarters in Vilnius Old Town – was sold and the company was liquidated in 2015. However, Pilvelis continued to publish Lietuvos aidas through a non-profit organization (viešoji įstaiga). The number of issues decreased to twice a week (Wednesday and Saturday). In 2013, 15 min reported that Lietuvos aidas employed only three people (Pilvelis and two others) and an advertising agency listed its circulation at 1,000 copies. Pilvelis died on August 27, 2016, and the publication was taken over by his daughter Rasa Pilvelytė-Čemeškienė. In 2019, it was a 16-page weekly with circulation of about 3,500 copies.
