= Kazimieras Prapuolenis =

Lithuanian Roman Catholic priest (1858–1933)

- Born: 1 March 1858; Lauckaimis, Congress Poland
- Died: 17 April 1933 (aged 75); Palanga, Lithuania
- Education: Saint Petersburg Roman Catholic Theological Academy
- Occupation: Catholic priest
- Movement: Lithuanian National Revival
- Awards: Order of the Lithuanian Grand Duke Gediminas

Kazimieras Prapuolenis (1 March 1858 – 17 April 1933) was a Lithuanian Roman Catholic priest.

Educated at the Saint Petersburg Roman Catholic Theological Academy, Prapuolenis worked as the secretary of the Archdiocese of Mogilev from 1889 to 1904. He was involved in the Lithuanian cultural life, helping to organize the Lithuanian and Samogitian Charitable Society, launching Lithuanian-language sermons at two churches in Saint Petersburg, and petitioning to get the Lithuanian press ban lifted. In 1904, he moved to Sejny where assisted with the establishment of a Lithuanian printing press and the Catholic periodicals Šaltinis and Vadovas. In 1909, he moved to Kaunas where he spent time on historical research and published Polskie Apostolstwo w Litwie (Polish Apostolate in Lithuania) in 1913. It was a controversial work which made him unpopular in Polish circles and the Roman Curia.

In 1912, Prapuolenis became a rector of Santo Stanislao dei Polacchi, the Polish church in Rome. At the same time, he became an unofficial Lithuanian representative in Rome. He helped organizing the Lithuanian Day (20 May 1917), an effort in Catholic churches worldwide to raise funds for the relief of war refugees in Lithuania. Prapuolenis publicized Lithuanian aspirations in the Italian press and coordinated his efforts with the Lithuanian Information Bureau established by Juozas Gabrys. In May 1921, Prapuolenis returned to Lithuania and became the head of the Department of Religions (Lithuanian: Tikybų departamentas) under the Ministry of the Interior. Due to poor health, he retired in 1925 and lived as an altarista in Palanga where he died in 1933.

== Biography ==
=== Early life and education ===
Prapuolenis was born on 1 March 1858 in Lauckaimis, then part of the Suwałki Governorate of Congress Poland. His father worked as a manor manager, while his mother was from East Prussia.

He attended primary schools in Alksnėnai, Pilviškiai, and Žalioji before enrolling at the Marijampolė Gymnasium in 1870. There he met Vincas Kudirka, the future editor of Varpas, and Jonas Jurgis Bulota, the future general.

After graduating in 1876, he continued his education at the Warsaw Priest Seminary but dropped out a year later due to "Polish ridicule of Lithuanians". He then tutored in Dłużew until he was able to enroll at the newly established Saint Petersburg Priest Seminary in 1879. He graduated from the seminary in 1881 and chose to continue his education at the Saint Petersburg Roman Catholic Theological Academy. After completing the third year and a thesis on Bernard of Clairvaux, he was awarded a candidate in theology. He finished his studies in March 1885 but did not take the final exams or finish his thesis on Pope Benedict XIV thus did not receive the master's degree in theology. He was ordained as a priest on 27 October 1885.

=== Russian Empire ===
==== Saint Petersburg ====
After graduation, Prapuolenis remained in Saint Petersburg and became chaplain of archbishop Aleksander Gintowt-Dziewałtowski. In 1889, he became secretary or chancellor of the Archdiocese of Mogilev and continued in this role under three archbishops and three administrators. Archbishop Bolesław Hieronim Kłopotowski appointed Prapuolenis as honorary canon. He was also a chaplain at various civilian and military schools, including Page Corps and Imperial School of Jurisprudence. One of his students was the future general Teodoras Daukantas who credited Prapuolenis with inspiring him to be proud of his Lithuanian identity.

Prapuolenis participated in the Lithuanian cultural life. He credited History of Lithuania in an Outline by Konstancja Skirmuntt (published in 1886) for solidifying his Lithuanian national identity. He was one of the co-founders and vice-chairmen of the Lithuanian and Samogitian Charitable Society to support Lithuanian students. He is credited with introducing Lithuanian-language sermons in Yamburg (Kingisepp), Narva, and at the Cathedral of the Assumption of the Blessed Virgin Mary (in 1896) and Church of St. Catherine (in 1889) in Saint Petersburg. In 1901, Prapuolenis convinced archbishop Bolesław Hieronim Kłopotowski to pressure bishop Stefan Aleksander Zwierowicz to grant one church (Church of Saint Nicholas) in Vilnius for Lithuanian needs – something a group of Lithuanian activists pursued since 1896.

Prapuolenis was a critic of the Lithuanian press ban and worked to have it lifted. Reportedly, already in 1890, he had the administrator of the Archdiocese of Mogilev submit a letter to the Ministry of Internal Affairs requesting to lift the ban. Around 1902, Prapuolenis maintained contacts with the staff of Dmitry Lyubimov (head of the chancery of the Ministry of Internal Affairs) and Konstantin Strolman (head of the Department of General Affairs of the Ministry of Internal Affairs). According to Andrius Dubinskas, he and Prapuolenis raised 1,200 rubles for bribing the officials so they would support repeal of the ban. In 1903, Mogilev's liturgical calendar included several Lithuanian texts prepared by Prapuolenis. The calendar was approved by the Russian censors in error becoming one of the handful of Lithuanian text legally published during the ban.

Due to his Lithuanian activities, Prapuolenis was disliked by Polish activists. For example, Aleksander Babiański, member of the Third Duma, slandered Prapuolenis in the press to the point where Prapuolenis sued for defamation. The case was taken up by Martynas Yčas. The new bishop Jerzy Józef Szembek dismissed Prapuolenis in May 1904. Prapuolenis was noted for his diplomatic skills and the good relationship with the Tsarist authorities; after his dismissal from the Archdiocese of Mogilev, he was awarded a state pension of 2,400 rubles per year and the Order of Saint Stanislaus (1st class). Due to this, Prapuolenis was labelled as a "Russian agent" by his opponents.

==== Sejny and Kaunas ====
He spent the summer with Kazimierz Mikołaj Michalkiewicz in Minsk. In September 1909, he moved to the Diocese of Sejny where he was a consistory judge until 1909. As the Lithuanian press ban was lifted in early 1904, he worked on establishing a Lithuanian printing press and the Catholic periodicals Šaltinis and Vadovas. He was the editor of the first three issues of Šaltinis, and the publisher of Vadovas until 1909 (though he continued to be indicated as the official publisher). He also studied the history of the Catholic Church in Lithuania.

In 1906, Tsarist officials considered removing bishop of Vilnius Edward Ropp and nominating a Lithuanian in his place. Governor General of Vilna Konstantin Krshivitsky considered Prapuolenis and Antanas Karosas as the most politically reliable candidates.

He moved to Kaunas in July 1909 where he lived on his state pension. In his notes, Prapuolenis noted that he felt used and started not getting along with the diocese administrator Józef Antonowicz. It was rumored that satirical articles about Antonowicz published in Garnys were written by Prapuolenis. In Kaunas, Prapuolenis devoted time to historical research and published Polskie Apostolstwo w Litwie, a controversial study about the negative Polish impact on Lithuanians in 1913 (see #Publications). He was also the director of bookkeeping courses established by Saulė Society in 1909.

=== Rome ===
==== Appointment ====
In 1908, the Diocese of Sejny organized the first larger Lithuanian pilgrimage to Rome. Priests Jurgis Narjauskas and Vladislovas Draugelis were able to meet with cardinal José de Calasanz Vives y Tutó to explain Lithuanian aspirations. According to Adomas Jakštas, after this trip, Lithuanian clergy realized that they needed a representative in Rome. According to Martynas Yčas, the idea arose after Lithuanians were unable to present a memorandum to the pope about the discrimination of Lithuanians and Lithuanian language in churches. Lithuanian bishops could reach the Holy See through prelate Kazimierz Skirmunt (1861–1931).

According to Yčas, Lithuanian priests offered to donate money for Prapuolenis' living expenses in Rome, but he refused. The plan came to fruition in May 1912, when Prapuolenis was assigned as a rector and chaplain to Santo Stanislao dei Polacchi – the Polish church in Rome which was under the control of the Russian embassy in Rome.

Prapuolenis was appointed to Rome because his anti-Polish attitudes aligned with anti-Polish policies of the Russian Empire. Additionally, since he spoke seven languages, he could assist all Catholic nations from the Russian Empire. Reportedly, Prapuolenis was considered as replacement for Gasparas Cirtautas, bishop of Samogitia who died in September 1913.

==== Status ====
While in Rome, Prapuolenis was involved in diplomacy. He aided Aleksandr Nelidov, the Russian representatives in Rome, and advocated for Lithuania becoming an unofficial Lithuanian representative. Due to his anti-Polish attitude, he did not have a good reputation in the Roman Curia, but was tolerated because he had the support of the Russian government. In nine years in Rome, Prapuolenis did not have an audience with either the pope or the Cardinal Secretary of State. Nevertheless, he was able to establish some personal contacts, for example with cardinal Vincenzo Vannutelli.

During World War I, Russians looked at Poland as a potential ally against the Germans while Prapuolenis became more involved in supporting Lithuanian independence efforts. As a result, the Russian Provisional Government terminated official relations with Prapuolenis in August 1917 but continued to pay his pension. Prapuolenis continued as an unofficial Lithuanian representative until August 1919 when Lithuania appointed the official representative Jurgis Narjauskas. According to historian Algimantas Kasparavičius, Prapuolenis was not suited for a diplomatic post because of his poor reputation in Rome, weak relations with Lithuanian bishops, overall friendliness with the Russians, and association with the controversial Juozas Gabrys.

In May 1920, despite protests by Prapuolenis, the Russian government transferred Santo Stanislao dei Polacchi to the Second Polish Republic. As a result, Prapuolenis had to leave the church and move out of the residence by July 1920. In early 1921, Pope Benedict XV did not confirm Prapuolenis' honorary title of cameriere segreto (secret chamberlain) which was granted in 1913. The Lithuanian representative Narjauskas decided to respond with a request to cardinal Pietro Gasparri to promote Prapuolenis to prelates (a much higher title than chamberlain) but was refused.

==== Activities ====
Prapuolenis found the church neglected. He was able to buy new chasubles, chairs, covers for altars, etc. but was not able to do much more due to the war and the low wages (250 francs per month).

As an unofficial Lithuanian representative, Prapuolenis assisted Lithuanian visitors to Rome: he provided a place to stay, advised on proper behavior, helped write and edit various documents and letters, etc. He helped organizing the Lithuanian Day (20 May 1917), an effort in Catholic churches worldwide to raise funds for the relief of war refugees in Lithuania. He was also involved in the Lithuanian efforts to select a Lithuanian as the new bishop of Vilnius (he supported Konstantinas Olšauskas).

Prapuolenis publicized Lithuanian aspirations in the Italian press and coordinated his efforts with the Lithuanian Information Bureau established by Juozas Gabrys. Publishing in the Italian press was difficult because of the language barrier (Prapuolenis learned Italian in about three years), lack of funds and collaborators, and Polish interference. For example, due to Polish pressure, La Vera Roma was prohibited from publishing his articles in 1916. The situation improved when he received financial aid from Lithuanian Americans: in 1918, he published 116 articles in various newspapers. According to Prapuolenis, in the first eleven months of 1919, he placed 378 articles about Lithuania in 208 different Italian newspapers.

While in Rome, Prapuolenis collected archival data and old books about the Catholic Church in Lithuania. However, this material was confiscated in the Free City of Danzig on his trip back to Lithuania.

=== Independent Lithuania ===
Portrait of Prapuolenis by Petras Kalpokas (1928)

In May 1921, Prapuolenis returned to Lithuania. He became an advisor to the Ministry of Foreign Affairs on church affairs effective 15 June 1921. He began criticizing Jurgis Narjauskas, the Lithuanian representative to the Holy See. The conflict ended with Prapuolenis resignation on 20 September 1920. He then became the head of the Department of Religions (Lithuanian: Tikybų departamentas) under the Ministry of the Interior. In late 1925, apostolic visitor Jurgis Matulaitis-Matulevičius criticized criticized Lithuanian priests who were too involved in state politics, including Mykolas Krupavičius, Antanas Šmulkštys, Juozas Purickis, and Prapuolenis.

Around 1923, Prapuolenis was a member of the audit committee of Galybė (might), a company that envisioned hydroelectric power plants on the Neris and Neman Rivers. The company, however, failed to obtain concessions from the Lithuanian government.

In 1925, due to poor health, he retired from the Department of Religions and became an altarista in Palanga. He received a state pension, including special pension for the former book smugglers, and was awarded the Order of the Lithuanian Grand Duke Gediminas (2nd degree) in 1928. He continued to be involved with Lithuanian cultural life. He aided the Lithuanian Revival Society (Lithuanian: Lietuvos atgimimo draugija) which united many of the activists of the Lithuanian National Revival and for a time chaired the Palanga chapter of the Lithuanian Nationalist Union. He also worked to install a clock at the Church of the Assumption of the Blessed Virgin Mary in October 1931.

Prapuolenis died on 17 April 1933 in Palanga and was buried in the churchyard of the Church of the Assumption of the Blessed Virgin Mary. In his last will, he donated his library to the Telšiai Priest Seminary and the Palanga chapter of the Lithuanian Riflemen's Union.

== Publications ==
=== Polish Apostolate in Lithuania ===
In 1911, Prapuolenis published a 44-page brochure in Polish Polscy Apostolowie Litwy (first published in Litwa). It stemmed from research conducted by Prapuolenis for bishop Bolesław Hieronim Kłopotowski when Lithuanians requested that a church in Vilnius would be assigned for their needs. Based on historical sources, it chronicled how the Poles used the Catholic Church to spread Polonization since the Christianization of Lithuania in 1387. Prapuolenis put forward a number of controversial arguments and judgments. For example, he viewed favourably the policies pursued by Mikhail Muravyov, the Russian governor-general notorious for the brutal suppression of the January Uprising in the Northwestern Krai, to weaken Polish cultural and political influence in Vilnius and the Lithuanian lands.

The book caused much controversy and criticism from the Poles. In response, Prapuolenis published 202-page expanded work Polskie Apostolstwo w Litwie (Polish Apostolate in Lithuania) in 1913. Historian Maciej Loret, head of the Polish Information and Press Bureau in Rome, published in response the article Un libello contro il clero polacco, published in four Italian newspapers: Corriere d’Italia, Avvenire d’Italia, Italia, and Il Momento.

The work was translated into Lithuanian by Karolis Račkauskas-Vairas and published in 1918 by the Association of Lithuanian Patriots in the United States; it was republished in Kaunas in 1938 and in Chicago in 1987. It was also translated to French by Juozas Gabrys and published in 1917 as L'église polonaise en Lithuanie by C. Propolanis. According to the Lithuanian representative Jurgis Narjauskas, the French edition was included in the Index Librorum Prohibitorum, the list of books prohibited by the Holy See, but it was not publicized. Since the work was ardently anti-Polish and indirectly accusatory of the Holy See, Prapuolenis became highly unpopular in the Polish circles and in the Roman Curia.

Prapuolenis wrote a similar work in Lithuanian, Katalikiškoji lietuvių pamokslija (Catholic Lithuanian Preaching), which was published in nine issues of Vadovas in 1909. It was an incomplete study as it ended with 1802.

=== Other ===
At first, Prapuolenis published articles in the Russian press, including Novoye Vremya and Sankt-Peterburgskie Vedomosti. For example, in 1902 he published an article criticizing the Lithuanian press ban in Novoye Vremya. When Prapuolenis moved to Sejny, he started contributing articles to the Lithuanian press, including Šaltinis and Vadovas. According to his memoirs, at the time, he was not comfortable writing in Lithuanian. He wrote in Polish or Russian and had the articles translated by Juozas Laukaitis. He also contributed articles to Lietuvių laikraštis, Draugija, Viltis, Vilniaus žinios, Lietuvis, Litwa, and others. He frequently wrote anti-Polish articles and, trying to avoid direct criticism, used various pseudonyms and pen names. Later, Prapuolenis published articles in various German and Italian periodicals.

A few of Prapuolenis' articles were aimed at Lithuanian nobles. Like several other activists of the Lithuanian Christian Democratic Party, he believed that the nobles could be persuaded to "return" to the Lithuanian nation and support the Lithuanian National Revival. He published an article showing how, through the ages, Lithuanian nobles defended and protected sovereignty of the Grand Duchy of Lithuania and thus did not become true Poles.

Prapuolenis also published brochures in Polish and Lithuanian. In 1913, Prapuolenis published brochure in Lithuanian Moteriškė (The Woman) based on Das Weib in der Natur- und Völkerkunde: Anthropologische Studien by Hermann Heinrich Ploss. It was prepared as a speech for the Lithuanian Catholic Women's Organization in 1910. It was a Catholic response to socialist attacks against the nuclear family.

Prapuolenis left two volumes of notes, mainly from the time he lived in Rome. These notes were edited and published by Remigijus Misiūnas as Romos užrašai (Roman Notes) in 2009. In these notes, Prapuolenis expressed some unconventional and even heretic ideas. For example, he valued Lithuanian paganism over "Polish Catholicism" and even wished that Lithuania would free itself from Vatican's influence. Additionally, he criticized Catholic bureaucracy, celibacy, and advocated for replacing Latin in church services with Lithuanian.

== Bibliography ==
- Buchowski, Krzysztof (2006). Litwomani i polonizatorzy (PDF) (in Polish). Białystok: Wydawnictwo Uniwersytetu w Białymstoku. ISBN 978-83-7431-075-8. OCLC 830808275.
- Dambrauskas-Jakštas, Aleksandras (1930). Užgesę žiburiai (in Lithuanian). Kaunas: Lietuvių katalikų mokslo akademija.
- Dubinskas, Andrius (26 July 1933). "K. Prapuolenio nuopelnai savąją spaudą atgaunant". Lietuvos aidas (in Lithuanian). Vol. 166, no. 1838. pp. 2–3.
- Kondratas, Benjaminas (26 January 2024) [2018]. "Kazimieras Prapuolenis". Visuotinė lietuvių enciklopedija (in Lithuanian). Mokslo ir enciklopedijų leidybos centras.
- Dagys, Petras (3 September 2011). "Tėvynės mylėtojų draugija". Voruta (in Lithuanian). 17 (731): 10. ISSN 1392-0677.
- Grigaravičius, Algirdas (2001). "Ką nuveikė Konstantinas Olšauskas (3)". Kultūros barai (in Lithuanian). 1 (434): 76–81. ISSN 0134-3106.
- Kapsevičius, Arūnas (11 April 2025). "Lietuvių kelionė į Rymą". Suvalkietis (in Lithuanian).
- Kasparavičius, Algimantas (2008). Tarp politikos ir diplomatijos: Šventasis Sostas ir Lietuvos Respublika (in Lithuanian). Lietuvos istorijos instituto leidykla. ISBN 978-9955-847-03-8.
- Katilius, Algimantas (2003). "Ką XX a. pradžioje Vatikanas žinojo apie Lietuvą?". Lietuvių katalikų mokslo akademijos metraštis (in Lithuanian). 23: 277–286. ISSN 1392-0502.
- ""Knyginyčia": atrastas prapuolęs litvomanas ir eretikas – kun. Kazimieras Prapuolenis". Lietuvos nacionalinė Martyno Mažvydo biblioteka. 18 April 2018.
- Merkelis, Aleksandras (1 March 1933a). "Kan. Kazimieras Prapuolenis 75 metų". Lietuvos aidas (in Lithuanian). Vol. 49, no. 1721. p. 4.
- Merkelis, Aleksandras (20 April 1933b). "Kas buvo Lietuvai kan. K. Prapuolenis". Lietuvos aidas (in Lithuanian). Vol. 87, no. 1759. p. 3.
- Mastianica, Olga (2016). Bajorija lietuvių tautiniame projekte (XIX a. pabaiga – XX a. pradžia) (in Lithuanian). Vilnius: Lietuvos istorijos institutas. ISBN 978-609-8183-13-9.
- Merkys, Vytautas (1994). Knygnešių laikai 1864–1904 (in Lithuanian). Vilnius: Valstybinis leidybos centras. ISBN 9986-09-018-0.
- Merkys, Vytautas (2006). Tautiniai santykiai Vilniaus vyskupijoje 1798–1918 m. (in Lithuanian). Versus aureus. ISBN 9955699426.
- Misiūnas, Remigijus (2004). Informacinių kovų kryžkelėse: JAV lietuvių informacinės kovos XIX a. pabaigoje – 1922 m. (PDF) (in Lithuanian). Vilnius: Versus Aurius. p. 76. ISBN 9955-601-39-6. Archived from the original (PDF) on 4 March 2016.
- Narjauskas, Jurgis (22 May 1933). "Kas tas neoficialus atstovas prie Vatikano". Rytas (in Lithuanian). Vol. 115, no. 2671. p. 3.
- Misiūnas, Remigijus (2009). "Pirmieji įrašai". Romos užrašai. By Prapuolenis, Kazimieras (in Lithuanian). Vilnius: Bonus animus. ISBN 978-9955-754-14-5.
- Prapuolenis, Kazimieras (1923). "Viešnamis prie Šv. Stanislovo bažnyčios Ryme". Draugija (in Lithuanian). 7–8: 278–286.
- Pukienė, Vida (1994). Lietuvių švietimo draugijos XX amžiaus pradžioje (1906–1915 metais) (in Lithuanian). A. Varno personalinė įmonė. ISBN 9986-491-11-8.
- Pukienė, Vida (2013). Prelatas Konstantinas Olšauskas: visuomenės veikėjo tragedija (PDF). Edukologija. ISBN 978-9955-20-884-6. Archived from the original (PDF) on 11 August 2018.
- Pupšys, Vytautas (27 June 2015). "Lietuvai atidavė viską". Voruta (in Lithuanian). 6 (812): 10. ISSN 1392-0677.
- Skirius, Juozas (2003). "Lietuva ir Vatikanas Pirmojo pasaulinio karo metais". Lietuvių katalikų mokslo akademijos metraštis (in Lithuanian). 23: 287–294. ISSN 1392-0502.
- Vaižgantas (2000). Raštai (in Lithuanian). Vol. 12: Publicistika, 1925–1928. Vilnius: Lietuvių literatūros ir tautosakos institutas. ISBN 9986-513-97-9.
- Vileišytė, Barbora (1968). "Kultūrinė Seinų spaustuvės veikla (1906–1915)" (PDF). Lietuvių katalikų mokslo akademijos metraštis (in Lithuanian). 4: 51–159. ISSN 1392-0502.
- Wojtanowska-Bąk, Natalia (2018). "Działalność polityczno-kulturalna Macieja Loreta w Rzymie przed wybuchem Wielkiej Wojny". Dzieje Najnowsze (in Polish). 50 (3): 45–47. doi:10.12775/DN.2018.3.01.<
- Yčas, Martynas (1933a). "A.a. kan. K. Prapuolenis". Vairas (in Lithuanian). Vol. 5. pp. 92–97.
- Yčas, Martynas (1933b). "Dar keli bruožai prie a.a. kan. Prapuolenio biografijos". Vairas (in Lithuanian). Vol. 6. pp. 238–240.
- Yčas, Martynas (2009). Iš Agaro krašto: 1885–1941 (PDF) (in Lithuanian). Kaunas: Candela. ISBN 978-9986-400-21-9.
- "Prapuolenis Kazimieras". Žemaičių žemė (in Lithuanian). Regionų kultūrinių iniciatyvų centras.
