= Vadovas =

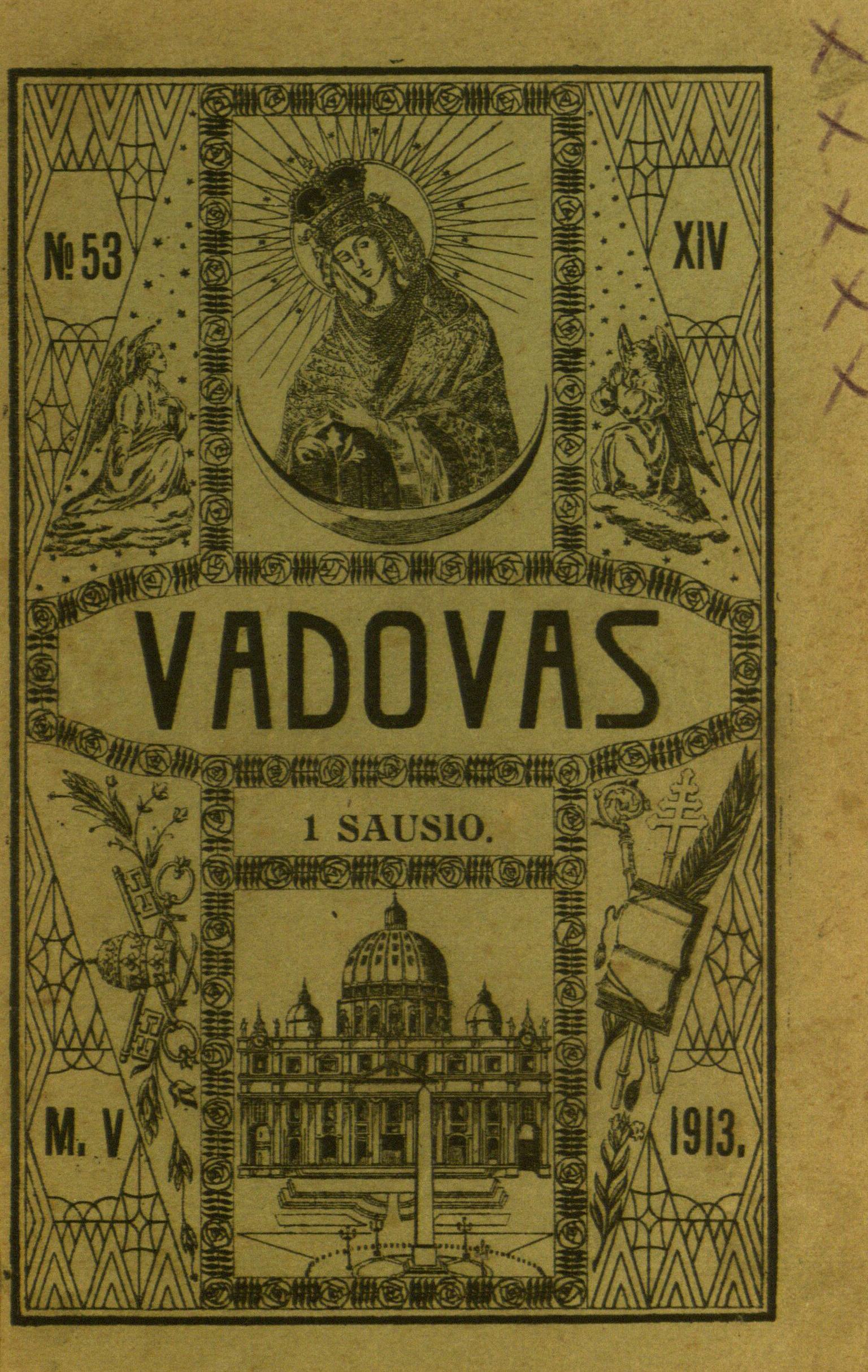
Cover page of January 1913 issue of Vadovas. It shows Our Lady of the Gate of Dawn (top) and St. Peter's Basilica (bottom).

Vadovas (transl. leader, guide) was a monthly Lithuanian-language magazine published in Sejny, then part of the Congress Poland, from September 1908 to December 1914 (a total of 76 issues). It was published by Lithuanian priests and intended for the Roman Catholic clergy.

== History ==
The Lithuanian press ban was lifted in 1905 and Lithuanians began organizing their periodicals. In spring 908, priest Juozas Laukaitis decided to establish a magazine for Lithuanian priests so that they could have weekly sermons in proper and correct Lithuanian language as well as articles discussing liturgy, theology, and other church matters.

The first issue was published on 1 September 1908, three months later than planned because it could not get the required 300 subscribers – the first call for subscribers received only 197 orders (109 orders from the Diocese of Sejny, 48 orders from the Diocese of Samogitia, 15 orders from the Diocese of Vilnius, 11 orders from the Archdiocese of Mogilev, and 4 orders from elsewhere). In mid-1909, there were 473 subscribers.

Priest Kazimieras Prapuolenis became the publisher of Vadovas. A year later, the publication was transferred to Laukaitis, Dvaranauskas, Narjauskas ir Bendrovė, a publishing company in Sejny that published Šaltinis. The magazine was financially supported by the Society of Saint Casimir. Juozapas Antanavičius, administrator of the Diocese of Sejny, was skeptical whether Vadovas was needed – he agreed that Lithuanian priests needed sermons, but felt that the magazine was too anti-Polish and that societal and church affairs were sufficiently covered in the Polish press (e.g. Przegląd Katolicki published in Warsaw).

The magazine was published in three annual books that combined four issues. Each issue had 100 or more pages. The magazine measured 24 by 15.8 centimetres (9.4 in × 6.2 in). The circulation reached 1,000 copies. Annual subscription cost 10 Russian rubles locally and 12 rubles abroad; in 1909 it was lowered to 7.5 and 9 rubles, respectively.

== Content ==
In September 1910, editor Justinas Staugaitis published his program for the content of Vadovas. It had five main sections: sermons, liturgy, articles, polemic, and bibliography.

One of the primary goals of the magazine was to publish sermons in proper Lithuanian that could be readily delivered by priests during the Sunday mass. The section on liturgy focused on ensuring that all priests delivered consistent services and did not introduce their own rituals. Articles were published on various Church events and issues, including the history of the local dioceses and churches. Staugaitis engaged in polemic against anti-religious publications and societies (known as pirmeiviai in Lithuanian). He explained that priests needed tools and arguments against the anti-religious propaganda, therefore he provided an overview of anti-religious activities and arguments against them. These polemic articles were also published as separate brochures Pirmeivių žiedai (a total of 12 issues). The bibliography section published news and reviews of new books. The magazine also published various official documents and proclamations of dioceses.

The magazine lacked contributors. Staugaitis, as editor, wrote about 25–30% of the content in 1910–1911. However, some of the texts were left unsigned making attribution and exact computation difficult. He also used pen names; he signed articles as Meškus and polemic as Paneupis.

In 1910, the magazine published revised Lithuanian prayers. Lithuanian prayers were full of loan words and barbarisms. Therefore, in 1909, priests Adomas Jakštas, Juozas Laukaitis, and Alfonsas Petrulis formed a committee to review and revise the Lord's Prayer and other Christian prayers. The priests were assisted by linguists, but in a few instances they did not dare change the almost 400-year tradition and fully implement linguists' suggestions. However, they much improved the language and the revised prayers were officially adopted by bishop Pranciškus Karevičius at the end of World War I.

Other notable articles were published on Lithuanian sermons by Kazimieras Prapuolenis, on the first Lithuanian newspaper Aušra by Jonas Totoraitis, and on the history of the Dioceses of Wigry and Sejny by Pranciškus Augustaitis.

== Editors ==
The magazine was edited by:

- Juozas Laukaitis – 1908–1909
- Justinas Staugaitis – 1909–1913
- Pranas Kuraitis – 1913–1914

Laukaitis was the founder of the magazine, but he was disliked by his ecclesiastical superiors and assigned to Leipalingis parish. The Diocese of Sejny replaced him with Staugaitis in June 1909. Staugaitis resigned from the magazine due to poor health, especially due to poor eyesight. He was assigned as parson to Pakuonis in July 1912. He was supposed to be replaced by Kuraitis who returned after studies at the University of Münster, but Staugaitis continued to be indicated as the editor until August 1913. Staugaitis returned to Vadovas in fall 1913 – spring 1914 while bishop Antanas Karosas and Kuraitis were on extended vacation in France.

== Contributors ==
Articles were contributed by Pranciškus Būčys, Blažiejus Čėsnys Vincas Dvaranauskas, Aleksandras Grigaitis, Juozas Montvila, Jonas Reitelaitis, Jonas Totoraitis, Tomas Žilinskas, and others.
