= Justinas Pranaitis =

Lithuanian priest (1861–1917)

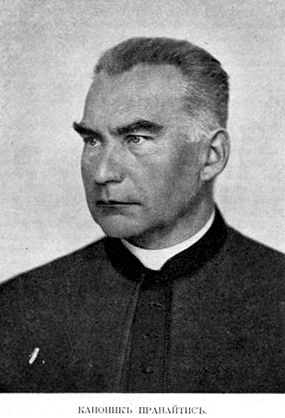
- Born: 27 July 1861; Panenupiai, Congress Poland
- Died: 28 January 1917 (aged 55); Petrograd, Russian Empire
- Other names: Justinas Pronaitis; Justin Pranaitis
- Education: Sejny Priest Seminary; Saint Petersburg Roman Catholic Theological Academy
- Occupation: Catholic priest
- Relatives: Julija Pranaitytė (sister)

Justinas Bonaventūra Pranaitis (Russian: Иустин Бонавенту́ра Пранайтис; 27 July 1861 – 28 January 1917) was a Lithuanian Catholic priest. He was a professor of Hebrew at the Saint Petersburg Roman Catholic Theological Academy and missionary in Uzbekistan. He is best known as the author of the antisemitic The Talmud Unmasked, and his subsequent involvement as a witness in the Beilis trial.

== Biography ==
=== Education and professorship ===
Justinas Pranaitis was born on 27 July 1861 to a peasant family in Panenupiai near Griškabūdis in Congress Poland, client state of the Russian Empire. After completing four classes at the Marijampolė Gymnasium, he enrolled at the Sejny Priest Seminary in 1878. He then continued to study at the Saint Petersburg Roman Catholic Theological Academy graduating with a Master of Theology in 1887. He was ordained priest in 1886.

Right after graduation, Pranaitis replaced Daniel Chwolson as the Hebrew professor at the Theological Academy. In addition, Pranaitis taught liturgy and church singing. He became prefect of the academy in 1891. He brought his younger sister Julija Pranaitytė to Saint Petersburg to study at a girls' gymnasium. She later became a publisher and editor of Lithuanian books and periodicals in the United States. Pranaitis supported Lithuanian cultural activities in Saint Petersburg, including the Lithuanian and Samogitian Charitable Society.

In 1894, Pranaitis was involved in a case of blackmail. He brought a picture to be gilded, but it burned down in a framing studio. Pranaitis demanded a compensation of 1,000 rubles from the workshop for damages. He claimed that it was a 17th-century painting by Bartolomé Esteban Murillo from the collection of archbishop Aleksander Gintowt-Dziewałtowski. However, such painting never existed.

=== Missionary ===
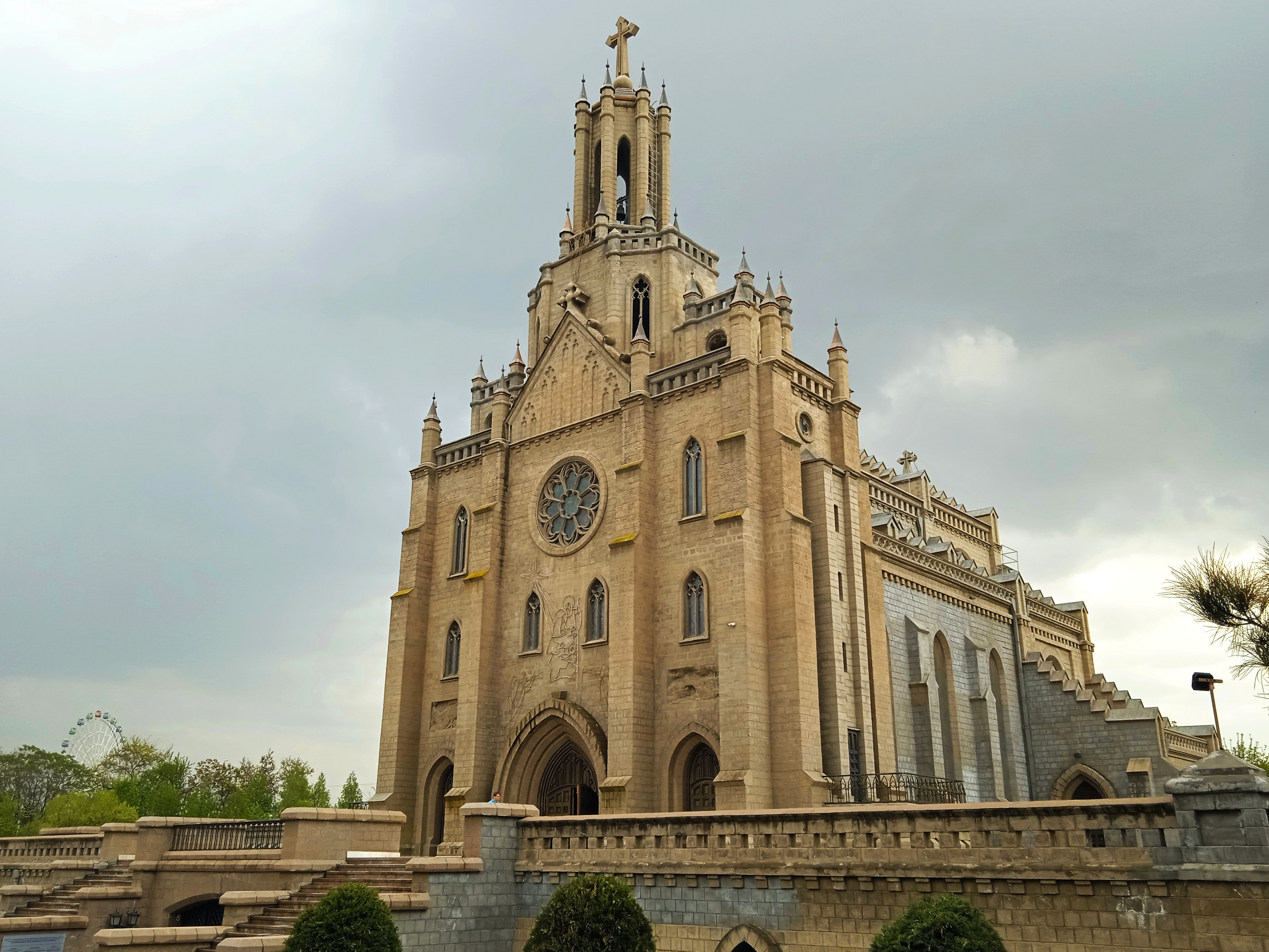
Sacred Heart Cathedral in Tashkent

In 1895, Pranaitis was exiled to Tver for two years. In 1897, archbishop Szymon Marcin Kozłowski sent Pranaitis to survey the situation of Roman Catholics in Turkistan. The following year, he visited regions of Siberia. In 1900, he left Saint Petersburg and relocated to Tashkent for missionary work among the local Roman Catholics.

He worked to construct churches in Tashkent (the Sacred Heart Cathedral), Samarkand (St. John the Baptist Church), Ashgabat, Gyzylarbat, Fergana as well as several chapels. He established a Catholic charitable society and a few small libraries. To help with construction, he built a sawmill that produced electricity. He frequently traveled visiting more remote members of the congregation. To help with this task, he managed to get two railroad cars, one equipped for church needs and another with a kitchen and living space. In 1909, Pranaitis accompanied auxiliary bishop Jan Cieplak to Manchuria and Japan.

In 1904, he published a proclamation asking for donations for a church in Tashkent. It became the first Lithuanian-language publication after the Lithuanian press ban was lifted. He also published articles in the Lithuanian press, including Lietuvių laikraštis, Šaltinis, Vienybė, Viltis. He also published in Polish Przegląd Katolicki.

=== Critic of the Talmud ===
Christianus in Talmude Iudaeorum

In 1892, Pranaitis published an antisemitic tract called Christianus in Talmude Iudaeorum in Latin, adapted from his Master's thesis, under the imprimatur of the Archbishop of Mogilev, which was subsequently translated into Polish (1892), French (1892), German (1894), Russian (1911), Lithuanian (1912), Italian (1939), English (1939) and Spanish. The English translation of the book is titled The Talmud Unmasked: The Secret Rabbinical Teachings Concerning Christians (usually shortened to The Talmud Unmasked). According to Anthony Julius, the work contains much that is fabricated, plagiarized, and wrongly translated. Stephen E. Atkins notes that in addition to mistranslation, many are taken out of context. Edmund Levin observes that Pranaitis was exposed as a fraud, ignorant of Semitic languages, and that the book was plagiarized from other antisemitic works, even down to typographical errors. Arthur Kurzweil notes it relies on earlier falsifications from Johann Eisenmenger and others. Ronald Modras and Ben-Zion Bokser note that he plagiarized Eisenmenger and August Rohling as well.

In 1912, Pranaitis testified in the blood libel case of Menahem Mendel Beilis in Russia. Beilis was accused of murdering a Christian child to take his blood for alleged Jewish rituals. Pranaitis was called as an expert witness to testify to the Talmudic hatred of Christians, as described in his book. His credibility rapidly evaporated, however, when the defence demonstrated his ignorance of some simple Talmudic concepts and definitions, such as hullin, erubin, to the point where "many in the audience occasionally laughed out loud when he clearly became confused and couldn't even intelligibly answer some of the questions asked by [Beilis'] lawyer". Pranaitis knew little Hebrew and could not read Aramaic, the primary language of the Talmud, at all, so was not a credible translator. In particular, journalist and historian Benzion Katz questioned him about Baba Batra, a Talmudic tractate that Pranaitis cited, phrasing if as it was a person. Pranaitis answered that he did not know without noticing the Baba Batra trick, showing he completely lacked the Talmudic expertise he claimed. Beilis was found not guilty.

According to a letter from Baron Rothschild to Vatican Secretary of State Merry Del Val, during a deposition for the trial Pranaitis claimed that he couldn't find a record of Innocent IV's papal bull Sicut Iudaeis against the blood libel in the "usual works of reference", and suspected that it was a forgery. Merry Del Val replied that it was authentic, although the message didn't arrive in time to affect the trial.

=== Death ===
Pranaitis was killed at the hands of the Bolsheviks on 28 January [O.S. 15 January] 1917 in Saint Petersburg. Other sources maintain that he died from cancer. He was buried by the Sacred Heart Cathedral that he worked to build in Tashkent. In 1923, the grave were destroyed by the Soviets. Bishop Pranciškus Būčys wrote 2118-page biography of Pranaitis but it remains unpublished.

== See also ==
- Criticism of the Talmud
- Dreyfus affair
