= Ploss =

Ploss or Ploß is a surname. Notable people with the surname include:

- Christoph Ploß (born 1985), German politician
- Hermann Heinrich Ploss (1819–1885), German gynecologist and anthropologist
