= Juozas Laukaitis =

Lithuanian Roman Catholic priest (1873–1952)

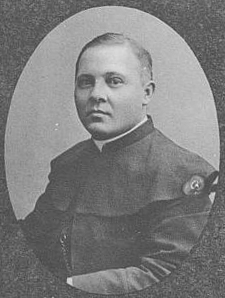
- Born: 3 February 1873; Giniūnai, Suwałki Governorate, Congress Poland
- Died: 15 August 1952 (aged 79); Vladimir Central Prison, Soviet Union
- Education: Sejny Priest Seminary; Saint Petersburg Roman Catholic Theological Academy
- Occupations: Catholic priest, member of State Duma and Seimas
- Awards: Order of the Lithuanian Grand Duke Gediminas

Juozas Laukaitis (3 February 1873 – 15 August 1952) was a Lithuanian Roman Catholic priest. He was a member of the Fourth State Duma of the Russian Empire (1912–1917) and of the Fourth Seimas of Lithuania (1936–1940).

Educated at the Sejny Priest Seminary and Saint Petersburg Roman Catholic Theological Academy, Laukaitis was ordained as a priest in 1897. He was assigned to Sejny where he became the chaplain of bishop Antanas Baranauskas until his death in 1902. In Sejny, Laukaitis worked at the curia, taught Lithuanian language at the seminary, and co-founded a printing press that published Catholic books and periodicals. He briefly was the chief editor of the weekly Šaltinis and monthly Vadovas. He cared about purity and correctness of the Lithuanian language, and organized a committee to revise the main Catholic prayers. In 1910, he was dismissed from curia and the seminary and assigned as pastor to the remote parish of Leipalingis.

In 1912, he was elected to the Fourth State Duma where he supported the Progressive Bloc and spoke against the Russification. During World War I, he lived in Saint Petersburg (then renamed to Petrograd) and chaired the local chapter of the Lithuanian Society for the Relief of War Sufferers. He also joined the efforts of the Council of the Lithuanian Nation which organized the Petrograd Seimas in 1917.

In 1919–1920, he toured numerous communities of Lithuanian Americans raising funds for the Žiburys Society. Upon return, he served as pastor in Kalvarija before returning to the curia of the Diocese of Sejny in 1924. The diocese was expelled from Sejny due to the Polish–Lithuanian War and was reorganized into the Diocese of Vilkaviškis in 1926. In 1931, he became the pastor of Seirijai. In 1936, he was elected to the Fourth Seimas where he attempted to defend Catholic rights against anti-religious policies of the ruling Lithuanian Nationalists Union.

Laukaitis was arrested by the Soviets in 1947 and sentenced to seven years in prison for his involvement with the Lithuanian partisans and anti-Soviet agitation. He served the sentence at the Vladimir Central Prison. He died in detention in 1952.

== Biography ==
=== Early life and education ===
Laukaits was born on 3 February 1873 in Giniūnai north of Prienai which was then part of the Suwałki Governorate in Congress Poland. His father claimed descent form the Lithuanian nobility and owned about 50 morgens of land. His father purchased prohibited Lithuanian periodicals from the book smugglers. The family raised five children, all of whom received education.

Laukaitis received first education together with the children of the manor owner in Bagrėnas. He then attended a Russian primary school in Prienai. In 1883, he enrolled at Marijampolė Gymnasium. Upon graduation, he joined Sejny Priest Seminary in 1889. There, he joined a group of Lithuanian students, distributed the banned Lithuanian publications, attended a meeting of Varpas publishers. He assisted Pranas Būčys with the translation of sermons by Karol Fischer which was published in 1894. He showed early interest in the Lithuanian language – he studied Lithuanian grammar and compiled a brief Lithuanian–Polish dictionary. For such activities, he was threatened with expulsion.

In 1893, Laukaitis continued his education at the Saint Petersburg Roman Catholic Theological Academy. He graduated with master's degree in theology and was ordained as a priest on 24 April 1897.

=== Sejny ===
In July 1897, Laukaitis became a secretary of the cathedral chapter of the Diocese of Sejny. A few months later, he became chaplain of bishop Antanas Baranauskas. They both were interested in the Lithuanian language and developed a friendship.

After Baranauskas' death in November 1902, Laukaitis remained secretary of the curia until May 1906, when he became its chairman (assessor). In September 1904, he also began teaching at the Sejny Priest Seminary. He taught classes in natural sciences, homiletics, Lithuanian language and literature – the Lithuanian lessons were introduced due to his efforts after the Lithuanian press ban was lifted in early 1904. Additionally, Laukaitis chaired the local chapter of Žiburys Society and directed its amateur theater (1907–1910).

Laukaitis became actively involved with the legalized Lithuanian press. He assisted with the establishment of the Society of Saint Casimir in Kaunas which published Lithuanian books and periodicals. In Sejny, together with Vincas Dvaranauskas and Jurgis Narjauskas, he founded a printing press which published Catholic texts. In total, from 1906 to 1915, the press published 257 books and 9 periodicals, including weekly Šaltinis and monthly Vadovas (Laukaitis was their editor in 1906–1907 and 1908–1909, respectively).

==== Language matters ====
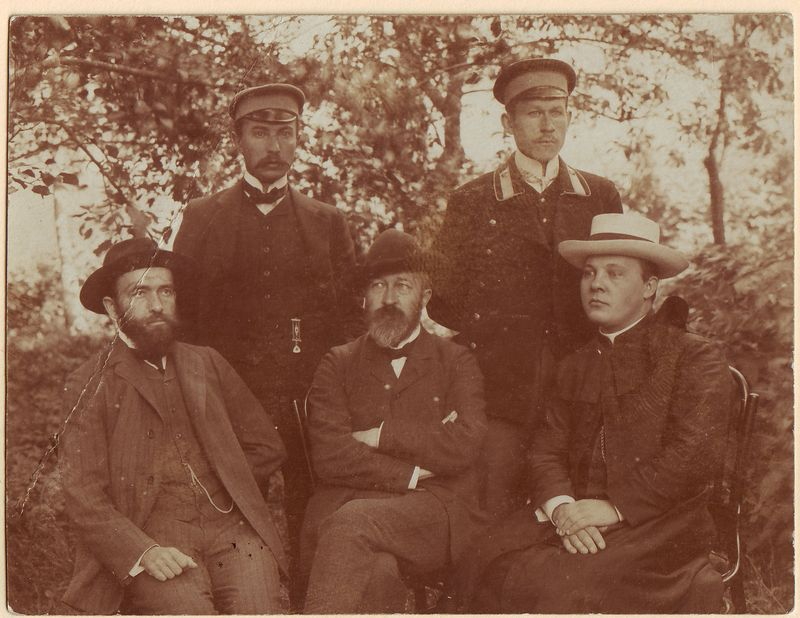
Four linguists and Laukaitis (sitting on the right) in Sejny in 1909

One of the impetus for Vadovas was providing priests with sermons and other religious texts in proper Lithuanian language. To that end, in July 1909, Laukaitis organized a meeting of most prominent Lithuanian linguists – Jonas Jablonskis, Kazimieras Būga, Juozas Balčikonis, and Jurgis Šlapelis – so that they could work on textbooks for the Lithuanian language. The meeting lasted about two months. Jablonskis wrote a textbook on syntax which was published in Vadovas in 1910.

At the same time, Laukaitis with priests Juozas Tumas and Alfonsas Petrulis formed a committee to remove the loan words and barbarisms from the Lord's Prayer and other Christian prayers. In a few instances they did not dare change the almost 400-year tradition and fully implement linguists' suggestions. However, they much improved the language and the revised prayers were officially adopted by bishop Pranciškus Karevičius at the end of World War I.

=== Leipalingis ===
Laukaitis' pro-Lithuanian activism angered his pro-Polish ecclesiastical superiors. Therefore, he was dismissed from the curia and the seminary and reassigned as pastor to Leipalingis in March 1910. The parish had about 6,000 residents but was remote. There, Laukaitis organized chapters of Žiburys Society in January 1911 with initial 440 members and Catholic Temperance Society in April 1912 with initial 719 members (the membership later grew to 1,350). He also recruited members to the agricultural Žagrė Society and sold about 200 shares.

Laukaitis established parish house which hosted a teahouse (as an non-alcoholic alternative to inns), a library which quickly grew to 800 books, and a large hall for meeting and cultural events. The first amateur theater performance was held there in 1912. Laukaitis organized a church choir and purchased new flags (banners) for the church.

=== State Duma ===
In October 1912, Laukaitis was elected to the Fourth State Duma from the Suwałki Governorate. He defeated, among others, incumbent Andrius Bulota, activist Jonas Basanavičius, and teacher Juozas Kairiūkštis.

At the Duma, Laukaitis supported the Progressive Bloc but did not officially join it because the occasionally his religious background clashed with bloc's policies. He was elected to three parliamentary committees – education, religion, and land servitudes. During Duma's sessions, Laukaitis spoke several times harshly criticizing various Russification policies, including discrimination of Catholics (for example, Catholics could not find government employment in Lithuania) and using Russian language in primary schools. At the same time, he explained goals of the Lithuanian National Revival and defended Lithuanian interests against Polish ambitions (for example, he criticized Polish dreams of resurrecting the old Polish–Lithuanian Commonwealth). Soviet authors attacked Laukaitis for his June 1913 speech in which he claimed that Lithuanian clergy helped to subdue the Russian Revolution of 1905.

During World War I, the Duma's Lithuanian members discussed raising the issue of Lithuanian autonomy. Laukaitis allied with Martynas Yčas, but they disagreed with Mykolas Januškevičius and Pranas Keinys and were unable to prepare a joint declaration. Overall, Laukaitis became less active in the Duma during the war.

=== World War I ===
During World War I, Laukaitis lived in Saint Petersburg (renamed to Petrograd). He joined the Lithuanian Society for the Relief of War Sufferers and became chairman of its chapter in Saint Petersburg. His tenure was marked by sharp disagreements between more conservative Christian Democrats and more liberal Social Democrats. He resigned in November 1916.

In 1916, Laukaitis was appointed canon. He returned to press work and assisted in publishing Lithuanian periodicals, including Vadas, and religious texts. He edited prayer books published by Vincas Mykolaitis-Putinas and Mykolas Krupavičius. He founded the Catholic Union of the Lithuanian Nation (Lietuvių tautos katalikų sąjunga) which participated in the founding of the Council of the Lithuanian Nation, but was not recognized as a political party and therefore removed from the council. In March 1917, Laukaitis became a member of the 12-member Temporary Committee for Governing Lithuania which was envisioned as a future Lithuanian provisional government. Laukaitis and 31 other members of the National Union participated in the Petrograd Seimas in June 1917. The National Union ceased activities in 1918.

=== Interwar Lithuania ===
After the Council of Lithuania proclaimed Lithuania's independence in February 1918, Laukaitis returned to Sejny. He became chancellor of the Diocese of Sejny in June 1918 and continued in this role until June 1924. He also returned to teaching Lithuanian language at the seminary in September 1918. Due to lack of teaching material, he started writing a Lithuanian textbook. However, Sejny, as part of the larger Suwałki Region was contested between Poland and Lithuania. Laukaitis organized a 50-men local volunteer police force and purchased them weapons. Since it was not safe in Sejny, Laukaitis was sent to the United States to raise funds for the Žiburys Society. From July 1919 to February 1920, he toured 85 communities of Lithuanian Americans and raised about $26,000 (equivalent to $417,900 in 2025).

In May 1920 or July 1921, Laukaitis was appointed as pastor and dean to Kalvarija where he continued to work until January 1923. There, he worked on repairing the clergy house, organizing a parish committee, and promoting Žiburys Society. Due to the Polish–Lithuanian war, bishop Antanas Karosas and the priest seminary were expelled from Sejny and moved to Marijampolė. From June 1924 to December 1930, Laukaitis served in the curia. In 1926, the Diocese of Sejny was reorganized into the Diocese of Vilkaviškis and Laukaitis was promoted to prelate. Laukaitis worked on diocese finances, construction of premises for Vilkaviškis Priest Seminary, and other administrative matters.

In 1931, Laukaitis was assigned as pastor to Seirijai. He purchased new church organs, installed new side altars, and renovated the churchyard. He also worked on the construction of a new church in Seirijai, but only foundations were laid. He continued to write articles on Lithuanian language and taught at local trade and agricultural schools.

=== Fourth Seimas ===
Politically, the ruling Lithuanian Nationalist Union was against the Lithuanian Christian Democratic Party and, by extension, the Roman Catholic Church, but Laukaitis kept neutral. In 1928, he was awarded the Order of the Lithuanian Grand Duke Gediminas (3rd degree).

In September 1936, Laukaitis was elected to the Fourth Seimas where he hoped to mediate the conflict between Catholics and the Nationalists. However, he was not able to make meaningful progress and quickly became disillusioned; he mainly worked on issues in education.

At the start of his tenure, Laukaitis was nominated for the post of the second vice-chairman of the Seimas, but refused. He worked on drafting various laws, including on the Vytautas the Great War Museum, personnel of pedagogical institutes and the Ministry of Education, Lithuanization of surnames, etc. He frequently proposed amendments that defended Catholic interests, but were most often rejected, including his proposals to teach religion at pedagogical institutes, remove restrictions imposed on Catholic organizations, and pay wages to school chaplains. In 1937, the government wanted to eliminate the philosophy section at the Faculty of Theology at Vytautas Magnus University. Laukaitis and two other priests threatened to resign from the Seimas in protest. The section was not eliminated.

Laukaitis sharply criticized the Nationalist Union, but also demonstrated his loyalty. For example, in October 1938 he proposed naming the newly established Institute for Lithuanian Studies (present-day Institute of the Lithuanian Language) after president Antanas Smetona.

=== Soviet persecution ===
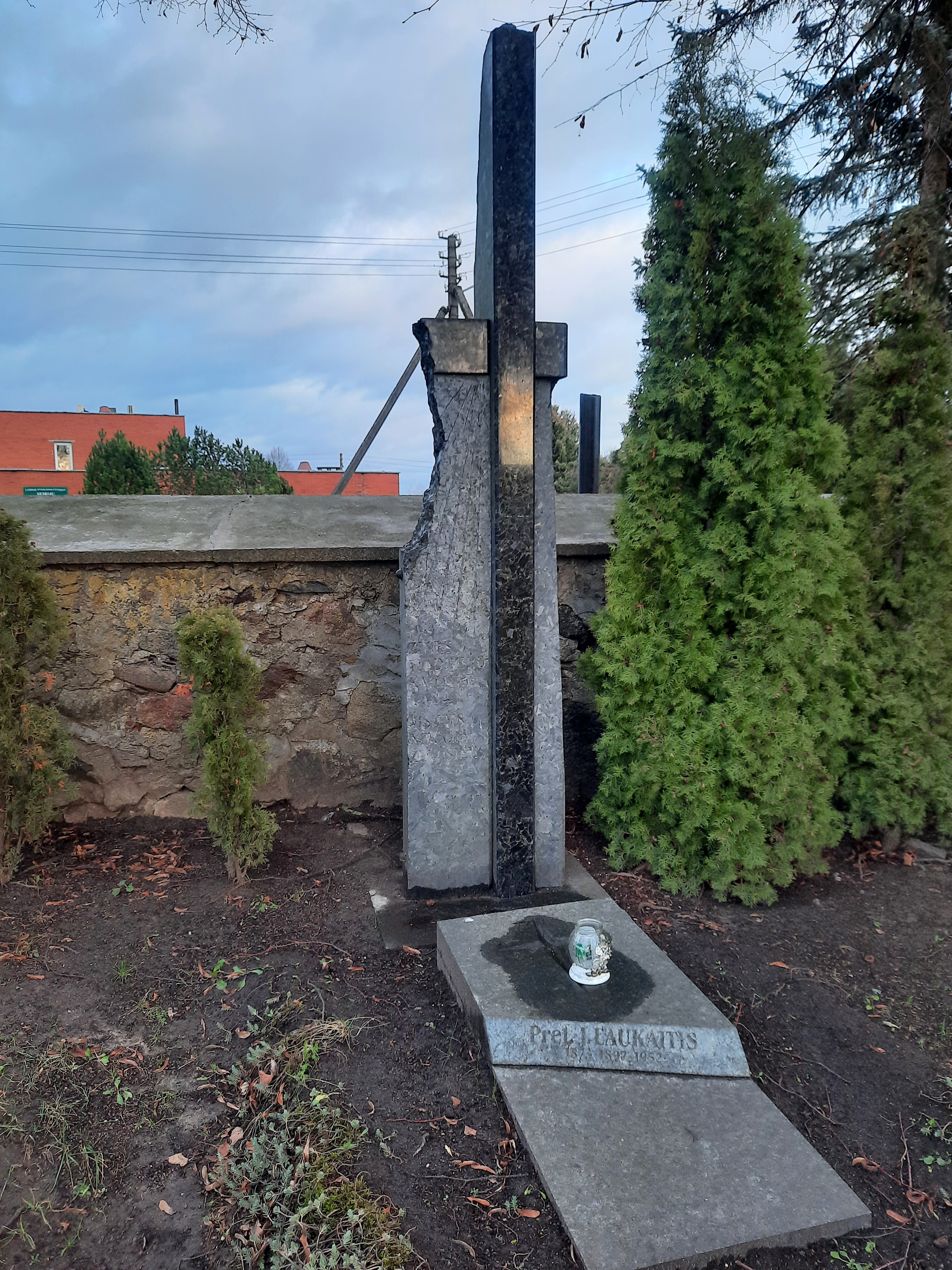
Symbolic grave of Laukaitis in Seirijai

In 1938, due to the old age, Laukaitis declined pastoral work and lived in Seirijai. He received a state pension of 600 litas. However, he returned to pastoral work after the Soviet NKVD arrested Seirijai pastor Juozas Leonavičius in January 1946.

On 26 February 1947, Laukaitis was called to administer last rites to a Lithuanian partisan who just gave birth in Graužai. As he was leaving, the house was attacked by Soviet internal troops. Partisan Antanas Zdanavičius-Viltis was killed in the shoot out.

Laukaitis was arrested on 29 April 1947. For a time, he was held at Kaunas Prison with Alfonsas Svarinskas. He was accused of cooperating with the Lithuanian partisans. Additionally, Soviet MGB produced witnesses who accused Laukaitis of cooperating with German police in persecuting Soviet activists during the German occupation and of delivering anti-Soviet sermons (i.e. anti-Soviet agitation). He was sentenced to seven years in prison by the Special Council of the MGB on 13 September 1947.

Laukaitis was held in Vladimir Central Prison. He died on 15 August 1952. His death place is given as either Vladimir Central Prison or Gulag camp near Novocherkassk. His burial place is unknown. A symbolic grave was erected in the churchyard in Seirijai. He was rehabilitated in 1989.

== Publications ==
Laukaitis was involved in publishing at least four Catholic periodicals: Šaltinis and Vadovas in Sejny (1906–1909), Vadas in Petrograd (1917), and Kas girdėti? in Marijampolė (1925).

Laukaitis published numerous articles in the Lithuanian press, including in Tiesos kelias, Gimtoji kalba, Draugija, Vilniaus žinios. Most of his articles were educational. Laukaitis frequently wrote about language issues, particularly about loan words and barbarisms in religious texts and the need to replace them with Lithuanian equivalents. However, he remained an amateur linguist, more interested in practical application than theory. In 1935, he published memoirs about bishop Antanas Baranauskas.

Laukaitis published religious books, including Mažasis katekizmas vaikeliams (Little Catechism for Children; three editions in 1904, 1907, and 1914) and Šventosios mišios (Holy Mass; 1910). He also wrote and translated several hymns.
