= Lietuvių laikraštis =

Nameplates of Lietuvių laikraštis

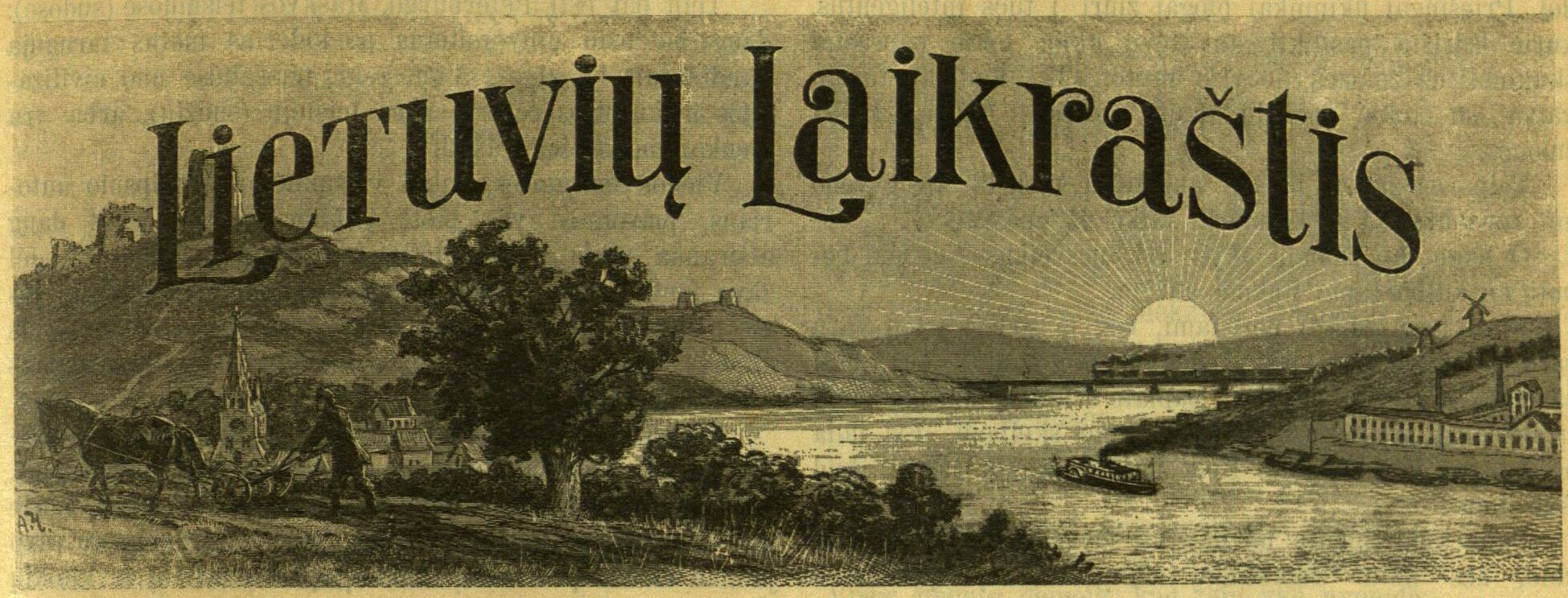
Nameplate with an oak tree in the foreground

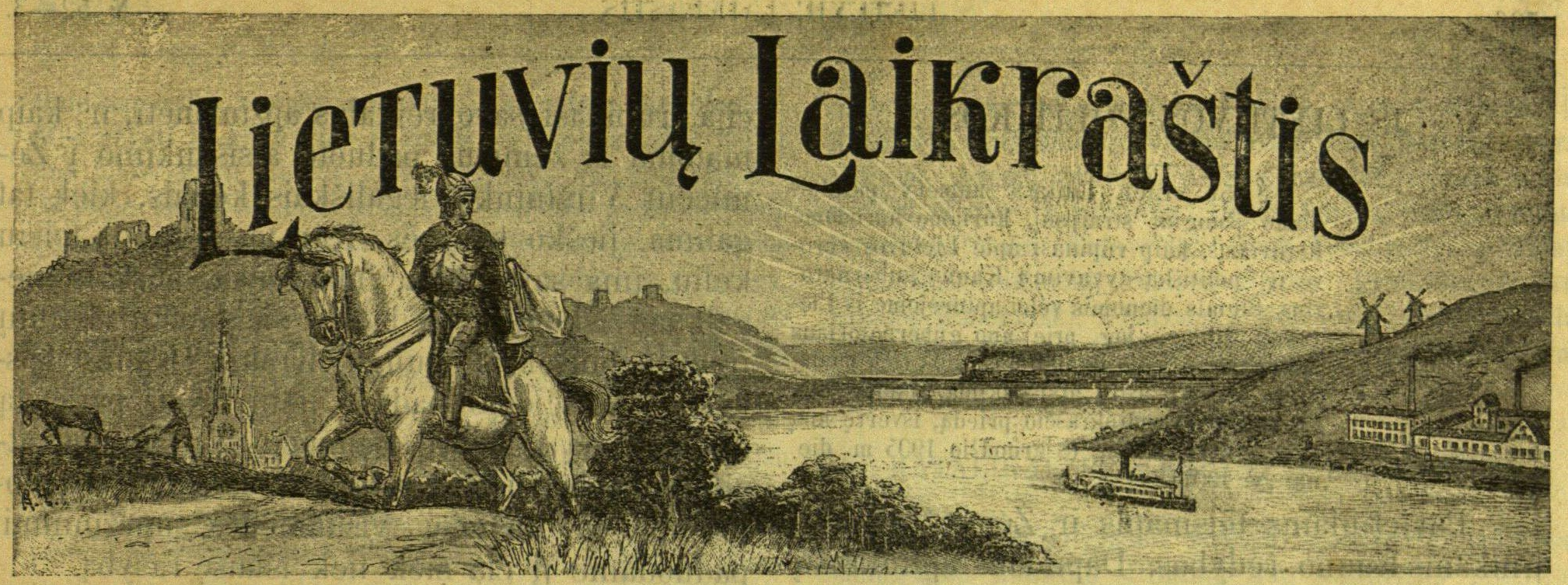
Nameplate as originally intended with Vytautas the Great riding a horse

Lietuvių laikraštis (transl. Newspaper of the Lithuanians) was an illustrated Lithuanian-language weekly newspaper published in Saint Petersburg, Russian Empire, from 1 December 1904 to 19 January 1906. It was the first legal Lithuanian periodical published in the Russian Empire after the Lithuanian press ban was lifted in May 1904. Established by a Lithuanian businessman and supported by the Lithuanian clergy, the newspaper did not become popular in Lithuania and closed after a year due to financial difficulties. It paid substantial attention to the history of Lithuania while neglecting to cover current events in Russia (e.g. the Russian Revolution of 1905). Many prominent Lithuanians contributed material to the newspaper, including Jonas Mačiulis-Maironis who is believed to have incited its publication.

== History ==
The Lithuanian press ban was lifted in May 1904. It is believed that Jonas Mačiulis-Maironis, who at the time was an inspector of the Saint Petersburg Roman Catholic Theological Academy, convinced Lithuanian trader Antanas Smilga to establish a Lithuanian periodical in Saint Petersburg. The newspaper was supported by the Lithuanian and Samogitian Charitable Society and Lithuanian clergy at the Theological Academy. The permit from the Tsarist authorities was received in October 1904 and the first issue was published on 1 December [O.S. 18 November] 1905. It was followed by the daily Vilniaus žinios published in Vilnius by Petras Vileišis on 23 December 1905.

One issue cost 15 kopeks and the annual subscription cost 5 rubles. The official editor of the newspaper was K. Narutavičius (first three issues) and later its publisher Smilga. However, the actual editor from January 1905 was Karolis Račkauskas-Vairas who was paid a monthly salary of 60 rubles. The newspaper had two nameplates. The original nameplate featuring Grand Duke Vytautas the Great riding a white horse was not allowed by the Tsarist censors; the Grand Duke was replaced by an oak tree. After the October Manifesto, the newspaper no longer needed approval from the censors and the original nameplate was used. The main censor the newspaper's content was Eduards Volters.

From the 12th issue, the newspaper was printed in its own printing press established by Smilga in a shop along the Griboyedov Canal. The debt incurred in opening the printing press contributed to the newspaper's financial troubles. From July 1905, the newspaper published 17 issues of a weekly supplement for those who found the main newspaper too expensive. The supplement mainly republished content from Lietuvių laikraštis. However, the newspaper did not become popular in Lithuania. The financial troubles became more pressing at the end of 1905. Staff salaries became irregular and staff began leaving the newspaper, but the newspaper still asked readers to subscribe for 1906. Lietuvių laikraštis was discontinued without a warning on 19 January [O.S. 6 January] 1906. In total, 52 issues were published encompassing about 750 pages.

== Content ==
Many of the contributors and supporters of the newspaper were members of the Roman Catholic clergy. Therefore, the newspaper is often described as conservative and Catholic-leaning. However, the newspaper also did not have a more defined political agenda and can also be described as non-partisan.

The newspaper had 12 pages and was similar to a magazine because it had the same recurring sections on politics, events in Lithuania, events elsewhere, economy, literature. It also had a section for children and humor. The newspaper is often criticized for content that was not timely or relevant to the Lithuanians in Lithuania. The newspaper was published during the turbulent times – Russo-Japanese War, Russian Revolution of 1905, October Manifesto, Great Seimas of Vilnius. However, the coverage of these events in the newspaper was poor as due to inexperience the editorial staff did not appreciate the importance of these events. The newspaper published illustrations from the war, but those were taken from other newspapers for free and had little to do with the actual content. After the censorship was lifted as a result of the October Manifesto, the newspaper published some openly anti-Tsarist jokes and parodies translated from radical Russian newspapers.

The newspaper wrote quite extensively about the history of Lithuania – it published illustrated articles about the Grand Dukes of Lithuania, bishops Merkelis Giedraitis and Motiejus Valančius, Lithuanian missionary Andrius Rudamina, Lithuanian activist Jonas Basanavičius. The articles were influenced by romantic nationalism and continued to popularize romantic legends (e.g. the so-called Scepter of Gediminas which supposedly depicted lunar Lithuanian calendar). In total, the newspaper published 36 articles on the history of Lithuania, of them ten about the Middle Ages and nine about local history.

== Contributors ==
Most notable contributors to the newspaper were Jonas Mačiulis-Maironis, who published two articles and several poems, and Adomas Jakštas, who published five articles and several poems, including one specifically written for the newspaper and published in the first issue. Other frequent authors included Mečislovas Davainis-Silvestraitis, Liudvika Didžiulienė, Liudas Gira, Jonas Krikščiūnas (Jovaras), Kazimieras Pakalniškis, Vincas Pietaris, and others. Other notable contributors included Jonas Basanavičius, Pranciškus Būčys, Peliksas Bugailiškis, Antanas Jaroševičius, Jonas Yčas, Martynas Yčas, Pranas Mašiotas, Povilas Matulionis, Ona Pleirytė-Puidienė, Justinas Pranaitis, Kazimieras Prapuolenis, Kazys Puida, Justinas Staugaitis, Jurgis Šaulys, Jonas Totoraitis, Juozas Tumas, Antanas Žukauskas.

== Bibliography ==
- Krutulys, Titas (2020). "Istoriniai straipsniai lietuvių periodinėje spaudoje 1904–1918 m.: kiekybinė apžvalga" (PDF). Lituanistica (in Lithuanian). 66 (3(121)). ISSN 0235-716X.
- Surblys, Alvydas; Zakaravičiūtė, Agnė; Rudminaitė, Edita (4 October 2016). ""Lietuvių laikraštis" – pirmas legalus periodinis leidinys po spaudos draudimo" (in Lithuanian). Kauno apskrities viešoji biblioteka.
- Urbonas, Vytas (2002). Lietuvos žurnalistikos istorija (in Lithuanian) (2nd ed.). Klaipėda: Klaipėdos universiteto leidykla. ISBN 9955-456-49-3.
- Vairas-Račkauskas, Karolis (2016). "Lietuvių laikraštis (1904.XI.18–1906.I.6)". Bibliotheca Lituana (in Lithuanian). 1. ISSN 2424-4422.
- Volteris, Eduardas (31 December 1932). "Cenzorius rusų laikais". Naujas žodis (in Lithuanian). 24 (181).
