= Pranciškus Būčys =

Lithuanian Catholic priest and profesor

Pranciškus Petras Būčys
- Titular bishop of Olympos
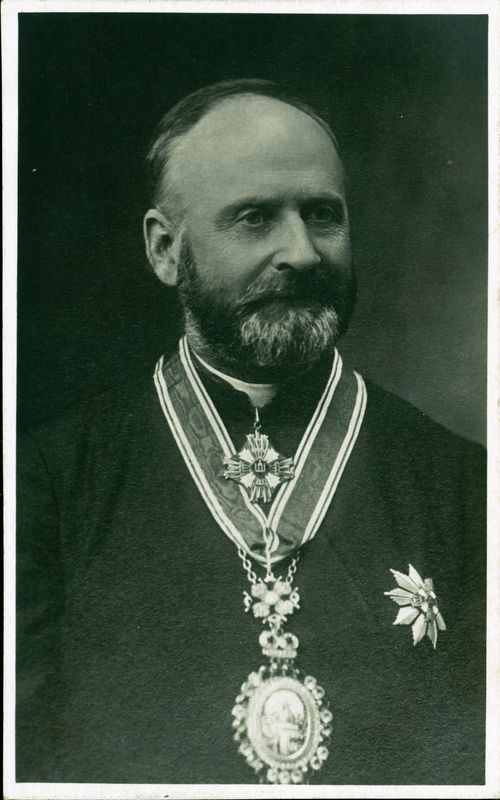
- Church: Eastern Catholic Church
- Installed: 1930
- Term ended: 1951
- Other posts: Rector of the University of Lithuania (1924–1925); Superior-General of the Congregation of Marian Fathers of the Immaculate Conception (1927–1933, 1939–1951)

Orders
- Ordination: 25 March 1899
- Consecration: 6 July 1930 by Kiril Kurtev
- Rank: Titular bishop

Personal details
- Born: 20 August 1872 Šilgaliai, Suwałki Governorate, Congress Poland
- Died: 25 October 1951 (aged 79) Rome, Italy
- Buried: Campo Verano
- Denomination: Catholic
- Education: Sejny Priest Seminary; Saint Petersburg Roman Catholic Theological Academy; University of Fribourg
- Motto: For Christ and Church

Pranciškus Petras Būčys (Polish: Piotr Franciszek Buczys, 20 August 1872 – 25 October 1951) was a Lithuanian Catholic priest, university professor, titular bishop of the Eastern Catholic Church (consecrated in 1930), and Superior-General of the Congregation of Marian Fathers of the Immaculate Conception (1927–1933, 1939–1951).

Born to a Lithuanian peasant family active in book smuggling, he studied at the Marijampolė Gymnasium and Sejny Priest Seminary and was active in Lithuanian cultural life. He started contributing articles to Lithuanian press, including Vienybė lietuvninkų and Varpas, in 1891. He continued his studies for a master's degree at the Saint Petersburg Roman Catholic Theological Academy where he formed a life-long friendship with fellow cleric Jurgis Matulaitis-Matulevičius. He earned his doctorate in theology at the University of Fribourg in Switzerland in 1901. In 1902, he became professor of apologetics and fundamental theology at the Saint Petersburg Roman Catholic Theological Academy. During the Russian Revolution of 1905, he participated in the Great Seimas of Vilnius and helped draft the program of the Lithuanian Christian Democratic Party. Bučys was prorector and acting rector of the academy in 1912–1915, but resigned upon learning that he would not be promoted to rectors because he was not Polish.

Together with Matulaitis-Matulevičius, Bučys joined the Congregation of Marian Fathers of the Immaculate Conception in 1909. At the time, the congregation was reduced to a single elderly member. Matulaitis-Matulevičius and Bučys spent considerable time and effort working on reviving and expanding the congregation. In 1916, Bučys traveled to United States to work with the newly established Marian Fathers in Chicago. He served as pastor to Lithuanian parishes in Sheboygan, Wisconsin, and Waukegan, Illinois, and edited the struggling Lithuanian daily Draugas. In 1921, he returned to Lithuania and worked on organizing the Faculty of Theology at the new University of Lithuania. He was dean of the faculty in 1922–1923 and 1925–1926, as well as university prorector in 1923–1924 and rector in 1924–1925. After the death of Matulaitis-Matulevičius in 1927, Bučys was elected as the Superior-General of the Marian Fathers and moved to Rome. There he became an advisory member of the pontifical commission on Russia and was consecrated as titular bishop of Olympos on 6 July 1930. He was tasked with a Catholic mission to convert Eastern Orthodoxs and Old Believers to Eastern Catholicism. He visited Russian diaspora in Europe and United States working to organize parishes. In 1934, he was ordered to work on converting Russians in Lithuania. He worked for five years organizing Eastern Catholic masses, public lectures, and publications, but did not achieve any more noteworthy results. He was reelected as the Superior-General of the Marian Fathers in 1939 and moved to Rome where he lived until his death in 1951.

== Biography ==
=== Early life and education ===
Būčys was born in the Šilgaliai village situated on the Šešupė river which acted as a natural border between Lithuania (then part of the Russian Empire) and East Prussia. He was the eldest of eight children in a Lithuanian peasant family that owned 86 morgen of land and was active in Lithuanian cultural life. His uncle Pranciškus Būčys (1849–1925) was a pastor in Gelgaudiškis and organized a circle of Lithuanian book smugglers. Būčys' father Jonas, uncle and godfather Petras, and brother Juozas were all involved in book smuggling. His brother Andrius also became a priest.

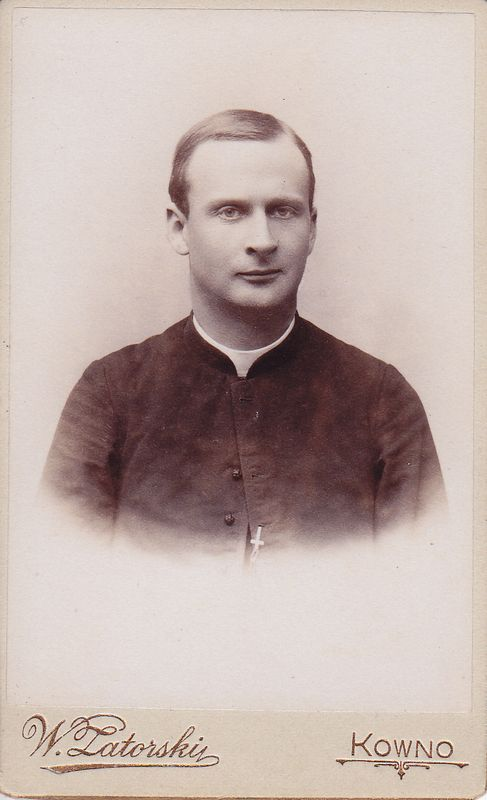
Būčys as a student

Būčys received his first education at home before entering a primary school in Slavikai in 1880. He studied at the Marijampolė Gymnasium in 1883–1889 and at the Sejny Priest Seminary in 1890–1895. He was an average student and had to repeat the fifth year at the gymnasium and failed entrance exams to the seminary in 1889. Already as a cleric, Būčys began contributing to the banned Lithuanian press. Together with Antanas Milukas and others, he organized a handwritten Lithuanian-language weekly newsletter, initially known as Knapt. It grew from 8 pages to 24 pages and changed titles to Visko po biskį (A Little About Everything) and Viltis (Hope). Būčys and Andrius Dubinskas wanted to organize a larger secret cleric society that would include members not only from Sejny but also from Kaunas and Vilnius Priest Seminaries. They held discussions with clerics in Kaunas and Vilnius, including about replacing Žemaičių ir Lietuvos apžvalga with another publication, but the plans did not come to fruition. Starting in 1891, Būčys also contributed articles to Ūkininkas, Vienybė lietuvninkų, Žemaičių ir Lietuvos apžvalga, Varpas. In Varpas, he argued with editor Vincas Kudirka about Caritatis, an encyclical of Pope Leo XIII in which the pope urged Polish bishops to obey Russian authorities. Kudirka attacked the encyclical citing the example of the Kražiai massacre in 1893 while Bučys defended it. He helped publish a Lithuanian translation of a collection of sermons by Karol Fischer (published in 1894) and edited a translation of The Month of Mary by Paweł Smolikowski (published in 1900).

He continued studies at the Saint Petersburg Roman Catholic Theological Academy. He earned the Candidate of Philosophy degree for the thesis on the Pope Honorius I and Third Council of Constantinople in 1898 and Master's of Theology for the thesis on Saint Stanislaus of Szczepanów in 1899. He was ordained as a priest on 25 March 1899. At the academy, Būčys studied with Jurgis Matulaitis-Matulevičius starting their life-long friendship. He was also close with Lithuanian professors at the academy: he inherited property of Kazimieras Jaunius and wrote a 2,426-page biography of Justinas Pranaitis though it remains unpublished. He continued to contribute to Lithuanian press, including to Tėvynės sargas and Žinyčia. Together with Matulaitis-Matulevičius, he further studied apologetics under professor Albert Maria Weiss at the University of Fribourg in Switzerland using an assumed name because the Tsarist police allowed Būčys to depart the Russian Empire for medical treatments, not for studies. In Fribourg, he joined the Lithuanian student society Rūta (rue). He was with Matulaitis-Matulevičius when he was operated for bone tuberculosis. To earn a living, Bučys held masses in Autigny and was chaplain of a girls' agricultural school in Orsonnens. He defended his expanded thesis on Saint Stanislaus, which was translated from Latin to Polish and published in 1902, and earned Doctor of Theology in July 1901.

=== Saint Petersburg and United States ===
Upon return to Lithuania in late 1901, Būčys hoped to become an editor of a Lithuanian newspaper and live in Tilsit (present-day Sovetsk, Kaliningrad Oblast). But bishop Antanas Baranauskas assigned him as a priest in his native Slavikai and as professor at the Sejny Priest Seminary before moving to the Saint Petersburg Roman Catholic Theological Academy in August 1902. He taught apologetics and fundamental theology not only to the clerics at the academy but also to students at other universities. His students included Mečislovas Reinys, Mykolas Krupavičius, Juozas Purickis, Vladas Jurgutis. In his memoirs, Bučys highlighted two weaknesses of his teaching methods – he emphasized ability to think rather than knowledge of facts and spent too much time analyzing anti-religious arguments. In 1912, Būčys became prorector of the Theological Academy. When rector Aleksander Kakowski became Archbishop of Warsaw, Būčys was an acting rector from May 1913 to March 1915, but as a non-Pole was not officially confirmed as rector. Upon learning that he would not become rector, he resigned from the academy and briefly worked as a religion teacher at different schools and as a private tutor.

In 1904, Bučys together with Maironis and Adomas Jakštas wrote the program of the Lithuanian Christian Democratic Party. In December 1905, during the Russian Revolution of 1905, Būčys participated in the Great Seimas of Vilnius and became a member of its five-member presidium when Juozas Tumas-Vaižgantas resigned in his favor. He did not chair a single session, but attempted to moderate extreme positions and opinions. He later faced criticism that before the end of World War I, he supported autonomy for Lithuania within the Russian Empire and not full independence. In Saint Petersburg, Bučys contributed articles to Lithuanian (he had his own sections in Šaltinis and Vadovas, Vilniaus žinios, Lietuvių laikraštis, Nedėldienio skaitymas, Draugija, Viltis, Vienybė), Polish (Przegląd Katolicki, Wiadomości Archidiecezjalne, Wiadomości Kościelne, Atenaum Kapłańskie), Belgian (Le Messager du Sacré-Coeur de Jésus), and American (New World in Chicago) press. He supported seven different Lithuanian societies and organizations in Saint Petersburg.

Matulaitis-Matulevičius joined him as a professor at the academy in 1907. They often discussed reviving the Congregation of Marian Fathers of the Immaculate Conception which at the time had only one elderly member, but it had to be done in secret due to various Russification policies. On 29 August 1909, in a private chapel of auxiliary bishop Kazimierz Ruszkiewicz at the clergy house of the Holy Cross Church in Warsaw, Matulaitis-Matulevičius became a member of the Marian Fathers and Būčys began his novitiate. In 1910, he refused an offer to become suffragan bishop of Samogitia.

During World War I, Būčys served as a priest and teacher to a Lithuanian refugee community in the Izmaylovo District near Moscow. In August 1916, Matulaitis-Matulevičius as Superior-General of the Marian Fathers, sent Būčys to Chicago, Illinois where Matulaitis-Matulevičius personally established the first house of the Marian Fathers in August 1913. He traveled via Finland, Sweden, Norway, UK, and France to Naples in Italy where he boarded a ship on 16 October. He reached Brooklyn on 3 November 1916. He received 70,000 rubles from the Lithuanian Society for the Relief of War Sufferers for the journey and was tasked with petitioning Pope Benedict XV to declare the Lithuanian Day, an international fundraising drive for the benefit of war refugees. Bučys was refused, but priest Konstantinas Olšauskas later managed to get the approval.

In United States, Bučys served as the pastor of Lithuanian parishes in Sheboygan, Wisconsin (August 1917 – May 1918) and Waukegan, Illinois (June 1918 – July 1921). From December 1918, he was also chaplain of the monastery of the Sisters of Saint Casimir and religion teacher at their school. At the same time, he edited the struggling Lithuanian daily Draugas (in February–July 1917 and September 1918 – July 1920) and in 1920 established religious weekly Laivas which continued to be published by the Marian Fathers in Chicago until 1990. He was also a member of the commission that collected a million signatures under a petition to President Warren G. Harding to recognize independent Lithuania.

=== Independent Lithuania ===
In July 1921, Būčys returned to Lithuania. From 1921 to 1923, he was rector of the Church of St. Gertrude in Kaunas, which was transferred to the Marian Fathers in February 1922. Būčys worked on establishing the Faculty of Theology at the newly organized University of Lithuania. He drafted the plan for the faculty and traveled to Rome to have it approved by the Congregation for Catholic Education. He also worked on the university statute. When the university was officially opened in February 1922, Būčys became professor of the fundamental theology. He was dean of the Faculty of Theology (April 1922 – August 1923), university prorector (September 1923 – September 1924), rector (September 1924 – September 1925), and again dean of the Faculty of Theology (September 1925 – September 1926).

He helped in organizing and was a board member of the Lithuanian Catholic Academy of Science (he attempted to establish the academy in 1907, but it was organized only in 1922). He organized the transfer of funds raised for a Catholic university to the new academy. He became a true academic member of the academy in 1936. In 1922, he proposed to build a church in Žaliakalnis neighborhood of Kaunas as a monument to Lithuania's independence. The idea was supported by Juozas Tumas-Vaižgantas, bishop Juozapas Skvireckas, and others and the construction of the Christ's Resurrection Church started in 1934. He continued to contribute articles to the press: he edited daily Laisvė (Freedom) in 1921 and published articles in Rytas, Lietuva, Šaltinis, Tiesos Kelias, Kosmos. In recognition of his contributions, he was awarded the Order of the Lithuanian Grand Duke Gediminas (2nd class) in 1928.

From 1923, Būčys was deputy of Matulaitis-Matulevičius, Superior-General of the Marian Fathers. When Matulaitis-Matulevičius resigned as bishop and was tasked with the negotiation of the Concordat with Lithuania, Bučys was his secretary. In 1926, Bučys accompanied Matulaitis-Matulevičius to United States to the 28th International Eucharistic Congress. At the same time, they consecrated a Lithuanian church in Cicero, Illinois, and visited the St Casimir's Lithuanian Church in London. Bučys administered the last rites to Matulaitis-Matulevičius before he died of appendicitis in January 1927. Būčys was elected the new Superior-General in December 1927. In September 1928, he resigned from the university and relocated to Rome. During his tenure as Superior-General until 1933, the Marian Fathers continued to grow and strengthen. The number of members reached 431. New houses were established in Panevėžys, Žemaičių Kalvarija, Rēzekne (Latvia), Washington D.C., and Thompson, Connecticut. Būčys worked to formalize statute, rules, and regulations of the congregation. He represented Lithuania and was elected as honorary member to the committees at the international Eucharistic congresses in Sydney, Australia (1928), Carthage, Tunisia (1930), and Dublin, Ireland (1932).

=== Eastern Catholic mission ===
Before his death, Matulaitis-Matulevičius considered a Catholic mission into Russia. It was supported and encouraged by the Vatican in hopes that respecting and leaving the traditional Byzantine customs would allow implementing Catholic dogma and teaching among Eastern Orthodoxs. After the death of Matulaitis-Matulevičius, Būčys continued to plan the mission. The mission by Michel d'Herbigny proved that a Catholic mission into the Soviet Union was impossible, and the attention was shifted to Russian diaspora. Bishop Pranciškus Karevičius (also a member of the Marian Fathers), papal internuncio Riccardo Bartoloni, and Prime Minister Augustinas Voldemaras agreed on the mission in Lithuania and the use of the St. Michael the Archangel Church for its purposes. While Lithuanian priests resisted learning Eastern rites and Lithuanian diplomats reconsidered their support due to possible negative effects on relations with Russia, Bučys continued with the mission.

From 1929, Būčys was an advisory member of the pontifical commission on Russia. On 6 July 1930, he was consecrated as titular bishop of Olympos by bishop Cyril Kurtev, Apostolic Exarch of the Bulgarian Catholic Apostolic Exarchate of Sofia, at the Church of San Clemente al Laterano. According to traditions, Bučys adopted a new name and chose Petras (Peter). He visited Russian communities in eight countries (including France, Belgium, Yugoslavia) in 1930 and Marian Fathers in United States in 1931. In 1932 and 1933, he visited United States organizing Catholic missions among the Russian immigrants. The Marian Fathers reelected him as their Superior-General in 1933, but the pope would not confirm the results and Bučys was forced to resign. He returned to Lithuania in June 1934 for the first Lithuanian Eucharistic Congress in Kaunas. He had a round-trip ticket and was expecting to return to United States, but received orders from the Vatican to remain in Lithuania and work among local Russians.

In October 1934, he held Eastern rite masses at the Church of St. Francis Xavier that attracted attention from Orthodox intelligentsia who were dissatisfied with the services of Metropolitan Eleutherius. He held additional Eastern Catholic masses at the Church of St. Gertrude but the interest quickly waned. He asked to be reassigned to United States, but was refused. In 1935–1936, he was the spiritual father of the Telšiai Priest Seminary. At the same time he visited various villages with larger populations of Eastern Orthodox and Old Believers, wrote articles to the press, including an academic study on the history and demographics of Eastern Orthodox and Old Believers in Lithuania, and published a book of popular readings for the faithful.

In November 1936, both Bučys and the Marian Fathers petitioned Pope Pius XI to reassign Bučys to work for the Marian Fathers. The pope refused and appointed Bučys as the head of the new papal Mission for Spiritual Assistance for the Russians of Lithuania established by the Congregation for the Oriental Churches. He returned to Kaunas in summer 1937 and held Eastern rite masses at the St. Michael the Archangel Church. He had two to four assistants. They held lectures on the need to eliminate the East–West Schism, tried to convert local Eastern Orthodox priests, published religious literature, but failed to convert a single more prominent member of the intelligentsia or the clergy or establish a single parish. They tried to expand the mission to Latvia, but were blocked from entering the country. Bučys was disappointed and disillusioned with the mission as many prospective converts had some ulterior motives (e.g. financial gain). After the death of Pope Pius XI in February 1939, Bučys was reelected as the Superior-General of the Marian Fathers in July 1939 and finally allowed to leave for Rome.

After the Soviet occupation of Lithuania in June 1940, he organized Lithuanian-language broadcast on the Vatican Radio and presented its first program on 27 November 1940. He continued to present until spring 1941. Bučys supervised missions of Marian Fathers in London and Harbin that continued to spread Eastern Catholicism and prepared a breviary suitable for those missions. He visited the Marian fathers in Argentina, North America, United Kingdom in 1949. He continued to lead the congregation until his resignation due to poor health in March 1951. He suffered a brain hemorrhage in September 1951 and a day before his death received permission to hold Latin rite masses. He died in October 1951 in Rome and was buried at the Campo Verano.

== Works ==
In addition to some 600 articles published in more than 30 periodicals, Būčys published a number of separate books on various topics. He published a collection of his articles as separate books Tikėjimo dalykai in 1913 and Gyvenimo pagrindas in 1931. His most important work is a three-volume theological work aimed at an average priest and school graduate. The three volumes on God the Creator, Jesus Christ, and the Holy Spirit were published in 1929–1932. His popular works include books about the Lourdes apparitions (first published in 1909, third edition in 1943), cautionary tales promoting the temperance movement (in 1925 and 1939), parents' right and obligation to raise and educate their children (in 1927), a conversation about the soul (in 1930). He also published guides for priests (collection of sermons in 1936, spiritual exercises in 1925), theology textbooks (brief apologetics in 1922, 1923, and 1926, on fundamental theology in 1923 and 1926, on theological encyclopedia in 1925), historical and demographic study on the Eastern Orthodox and Old Believers in Lithuania (in 1936), an essay on education arguing that the state should only finance schools that should be run by communities and organizations in 1918, a report on the 29th Eucharistic congress in 1929, a review of a book on ethics by Adomas Jakštas (Su Jakštu per pikto laukus in 1937), a work of fiction (Rapukus kaupiant in 1928), and others. He wrote six notebooks (396 pages) worth of memoirs and published excerpts in Tėvynės sargas; they were published posthumously in 1966. He left other thick volumes of manuscripts on his thoughts for the Marian Fathers, on good behavior, and miracles of Jesus as well as an extensive biography of Justinas Pranaitis.

Bučys was one of four most prominent Lithuanian apologists of the time (others were Adomas Jakštas, Justinas Staugaitis, and Pranas Dovydaitis). The public discussion of apologetics peaked in the Lithuanian press around 1910–1915. In his writings, Bučys was rather soft and polite. Most frequently he used arguments based on history and natural science. He avoided dry theory and searched for a more practical approach and real-life examples. He had a good memory and knew more than ten languages (he could write rather fluently in six of them – Lithuanian, Latin, Polish, Russian, French, and English).
