= The Talmud Unmasked =

1892 book by Justin Bonaventure Pranaitis

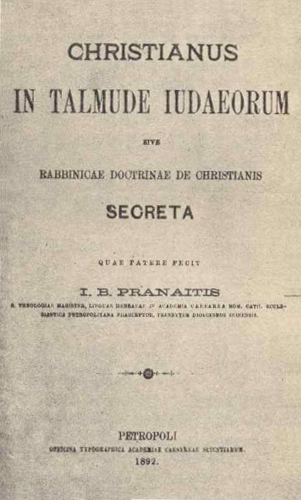
- Author: Justinas Pranaitis
- Publication date: 1892

The Talmud Unmasked (Latin: Christianus in Talmud Iudaeorum: sive, Rabbinicae doctrinae Christiani secreta. English: The Christian in the Jewish Talmud: Secret rabbinical teachings concerning Christians) is a book published in 1892 by Justinas Bonaventure Pranaitis (1861–1917), a Lithuanian Catholic priest. The book is a collection of purported quotations from the Talmud and Zohar that are claimed to demonstrate that Judaism despises non-Jews and promotes the murder or injury of non-Jews in some instances. Pranaitis drew on the earlier works of Jakob Ecker and August Rohling.

Scholars classify "The Talmud Unmasked" as an antisemitic and anti-Talmudic work, comparable to "Der Talmud Jude" by Rohling (1871) and "The Traditions of the Jews" by Johann Eisenmenger (1700). Modern authors agree that Pranaitis was not competent in Aramaic and the work contains mistranslations, plagiarism from those earlier works, and fabrications.

== Contents ==
The Talmud Unmasked is a collection of purported quotes from the Talmud, the Zohar and other Jewish texts.

Although he made use of Hebrew and Latin translations, Pranaitis knew little Hebrew and could not read Aramaic, the primary language of the Talmud, at all, so was not a credible translator. During the 1913 Beilis Affair trial, Pranaitis testified as an expert witness who claimed that Jews would require blood for Passover (i.e., the blood libel). He was made to look foolish by journalist and historian Benzion Katz, who devised a set of questions for defense attorneys to ask him on basic information about the Talmud. Katz phrased the question as though Baba Batra was a person, even though it is a Talmudic tractate that Pranaitis cites. Pranaitis did not know any of the information on the stand and answered that he didn't know without noticing the Baba Batra trick, showing he completely lacked the Talmudic expertise he claimed. According to Anthony Julius, the work contains much that is fabricated, plagiarized, and wrongly translated. Stephen E. Atkins notes that in addition to mistranslation, many are taken out of context. Edmund Levin observes that Pranaitis was exposed as a fraud, ignorant of Semitic languages, and that the book was plagiarized from other antisemitic works, even down to typographical errors. Arthur Kurzweil notes it relies on earlier falsifications from Eisenmenger and others. Ronald Modras and Ben-Zion Bokser note that he plagiarized Eisenmenger and Rohling as well.

The book includes numerous quotations that are claimed to demonstrate that Jews do not regard non-Jews as human beings, that the Talmud contains blasphemies against Jesus and offensive passages about Christians, that Judaism despises non-Jews, and that the Talmud urges Jews to do a variety of harms to Christians, such as murder and theft, and teaches that each death of a Christian serves as a substitute for the Temple sacrifices, which would then hasten the arrival of the Jewish messiah.

== Use by apocalyptic groups ==
Jeffrey Kaplan describes how the book was used by groups to support apocalyptic theories, especially regarding the end-of-times.

== See also ==
- Criticism of the Talmud
- Criticism of Judaism
- Johann Eisenmenger
- Protocols of the Elders of Zion
