= Fundamental theology =

Foundational tenets in Catholicism

Fundamental theology, in John Hardon's Modern Catholic Dictionary, is a "branch of theology which establishes the fact that God has made a supernatural revelation and established the Church, founded by Christ, as its divinely authorized custodian and interpreter."

Encyclopedia.com, using an excerpt from New Catholic Encyclopedia, states that "fundamental theology", a "very literal translation" of theologia fundamentalis, is "commonly understood within Roman Catholic theology [...] [to] refer to the introductory tract that treats the nature, possibility, and existence of revelation", and is "often used today indiscriminately" with the term foundational theology.

Unlike apologetics, fundamental theology does not directly work towards evangelization, but rather towards the analysis of where and by what means God brings human beings to assent to his Word.

Joseph Pohle in 1912 wrote:

At times, apologetics or fundamental theology is called "general dogmatic theology," dogmatic theology proper being distinguished from it as "special dogmatic theology." In present-day use, however, apologetics is no longer treated as part of dogmatic theology but has attained the rank of an independent science, being generally regarded as the introduction to and foundation of dogmatic theology.

== See also ==
- Apostolic succession
- Dogma – Beliefs accepted by members of a group without question
- Dogmatic theology – Theology of theoretical official truths
- Theology proper – Sub-discipline of systematic theology
- Four Marks of the Church
- Fundamentalism
- Wissenschaft – German language term; any study that involves systematic research -also called "science"
- Origin myth#Founding myth
