= Konstancja Skirmuntt =

Amateur historian

- Konstancija Skirmuntaitė
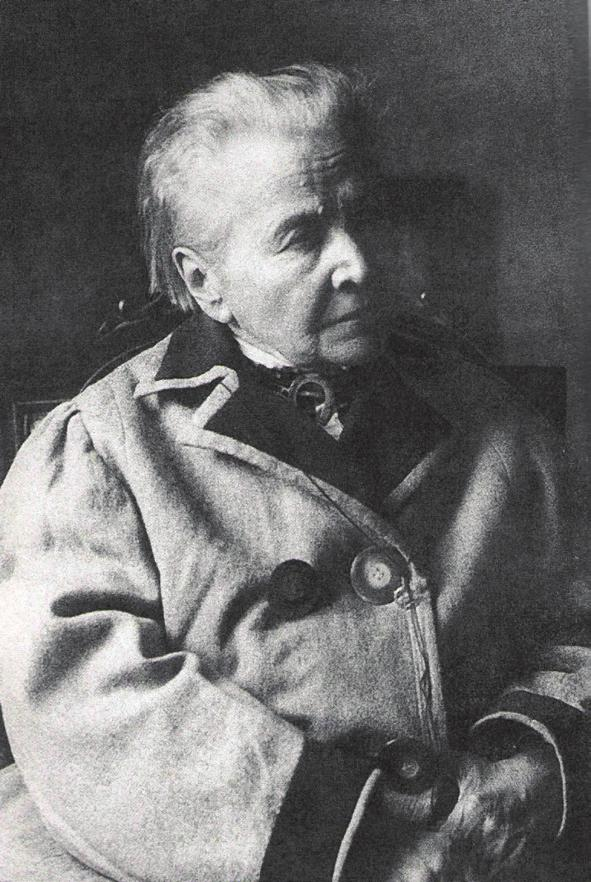
- Portrait of Skirmuntt, c.1930-34
- Born: Kalodnaje, Pinsky Uyezd, Russian Empire
- Died: Kołodno, Polesie Voivodeship, Second Polish Republic
- Resting place: Pinsk; 52.127483°N 26.087852°E
- Relatives: Helena Skirmunt
- Writing career
- Pen name: Pojata; Futurus
- Language: Polish
- Genre: History
- Subject: History of Lithuania
- Notable awards: Pro Ecclesia et Pontifice
- Literary movement: Krajowcy; Lithuanian National Revival

Konstancja Skirmuntt (also Konstancja Skirmunttówna, Lithuanian: Konstancija Skirmuntaitė; 1851–1934) was an amateur Polish-Lithuanian historian, a member of the Krajowcy movement who wanted to preserve the dual Polish-Lithuanian identity. Born to a noble family of deep roots in the former Grand Duchy of Lithuania, Skirmuntt spent most of her life in or near Pinsk. Without any formal education in history, she wrote four major historical works that romanticized and idealized the past. Written in easy and accessible language, they became popular. She also published articles in Polish and Lithuanian press debating the issues of the Polish-Lithuanian identity. She supported the Lithuanian National Revival, but opposed both Lithuanian and Polish nationalism. After World War I, she published criticism of the Second Polish Republic and its policies and attitudes towards its ethnic minorities.

== Biography ==
Skirmuntt was born in 1851 in Kalodnaje in the Pinsky Uyezd of the Minsk Governorate of the Russian Empire (present-day Stolin District of Belarus). Her family of local nobles traced their lineage to the 13th century. Her mother, Helena Skirmunt, was a painter and sculptor. As many other children of the nobility, Skirmuntt was educated at home by tutors. Both of her parents supported the January Uprising of 1863, were arrested and exiled to Russia. The children were left in the care of their aging grandmother who sent Skirmutt to study in Kalisz. In 1869, when her parents were released from exile, Skirmuntt accompanied them to the Crimea. She returned to Poland after her mother's death in 1874, and continued to live in Pinsk until her death in 1934. She never married and had no children.

== Works ==
Her first work on the history of Lithuania was published under the pen name Pojata in 1886. In 1897–1909, she published a three-volume work on the prehistory and early history of Lithuania. She romanticized and idealized the past, praised and glorified various Grand Dukes (especially Grand Duke Vytautas), criticized Jogaila, vilified the Teutonic Order. Her books were written in easy accessible language and were translated to Lithuanian becoming very popular among the activists of the Lithuanian National Revival. She also wrote numerous articles on political and ethnic issues for the Polish and Lithuanian press, including Kraj, Przegląd Wileński, Kurier Wileński, and Litwa, often using the pen name Futurus. Two collections of her articles were published in 1907 and 1913. She corresponded with Eliza Orzeszkowa, Polish positivist writer.

During the tenure of Prime Minister Pyotr Stolypin, she managed to protect a Catholic church from destruction in Haradzišča, a village near Pinsk. In 1910, together with Marian Zdziechowski, she unsuccessfully worked to bring a Lithuanian delegation to the 500th anniversary celebrations of the Battle of Grunwald in Kraków. In 1911–1912, she unsuccessfully campaigned for a Lithuanian Faculty at the Jagiellonian University. For her works and efforts, she was awarded the Pro Ecclesia et Pontifice by the Vatican and an honorary doctorate by the Vytautas Magnus University.

== Political views ==
Skirmuntt supported the Lithuanian National Revival and corresponded with such Lithuanian activists as Jonas Basanavičius and Adomas Jakštas, but she did not support either Lithuanian or Polish nationalism. She identified as a Lithuanian, but spoke Polish and supported a union between Poland and Lithuania in the historic traditions of the Polish–Lithuanian Commonwealth (see: Krajowcy). In 1914, she published a 10-page Lithuanian-language brochure Nosce te ipsum in which she criticized the division into "us" and "them" solely based on the language – she lamented the fact that Lithuanians had rejected the poet Adam Mickiewicz or composer Stanisław Moniuszko solely because they wrote in Polish. While her historical works were popular, she faced criticism and was shunned by both Poles (who considered her a "separatist") and Lithuanians (who did not consider her to be a true Lithuanian). Seeing the inevitable rise of nationalism, she referred to herself as the "last Mohican" in a letter to Basanavičius.

After World War I, Pińsk became a part of the Second Polish Republic. She criticized Żeligowski's Mutiny (by which Poland captured Wilno from Lithuania) and Polish policies toward ethnic minorities. She urged Poland to understand and respect people living in the Kresy who were of different nationality and culture than the Polish people. She expressed these views in Idea jagiellońska a polityka kresowa published in 1925 and the brochure Kwestja zasad published in 1933. At the same time, she criticized the Lithuanian government for signing the Soviet–Lithuanian Peace Treaty in 1920 and the Constituent Assembly of Lithuania for launching a land reform which nationalized land owned by the nobility.

== Bibliography ==
Her major works were:

- Dzieje Litwy opowiedziane w zarysie (History of Lithuania in an Outline; 1886; translated to Lithuanian in 1887–1888 and French in 1901)
- Z najstarszych czasów plemienia litewskiego (From the Oldest Times of the Lithuanians; 1892; republished in 1897 as the first volume of the Nad Niemnem i nad Bałtykiem series)
- Nad Niemnem i nad Bałtykiem (Along the Neman and the Baltic), three volumes:
  - W zaraniu dziejów (The Dawn of History; 1897)
  - Podania; Czasy przed-Mendogowe; Dzieje starożytnych Prus (Legends, Pre-Mindaugas Times, History of Ancient Prussia; 1903; translated to Lithuanian in 1922)
  - Mindog, król Litwy (Mindaugas, King of Lithuania; 1909; first published in Lithuanian in 1908)
- Idea jagiellońska a polityka kresowa (Jagiellonian Idea and the Borderland Policy; 1925)
