= Šaltinis =

Lithuanian-language weekly newspaper

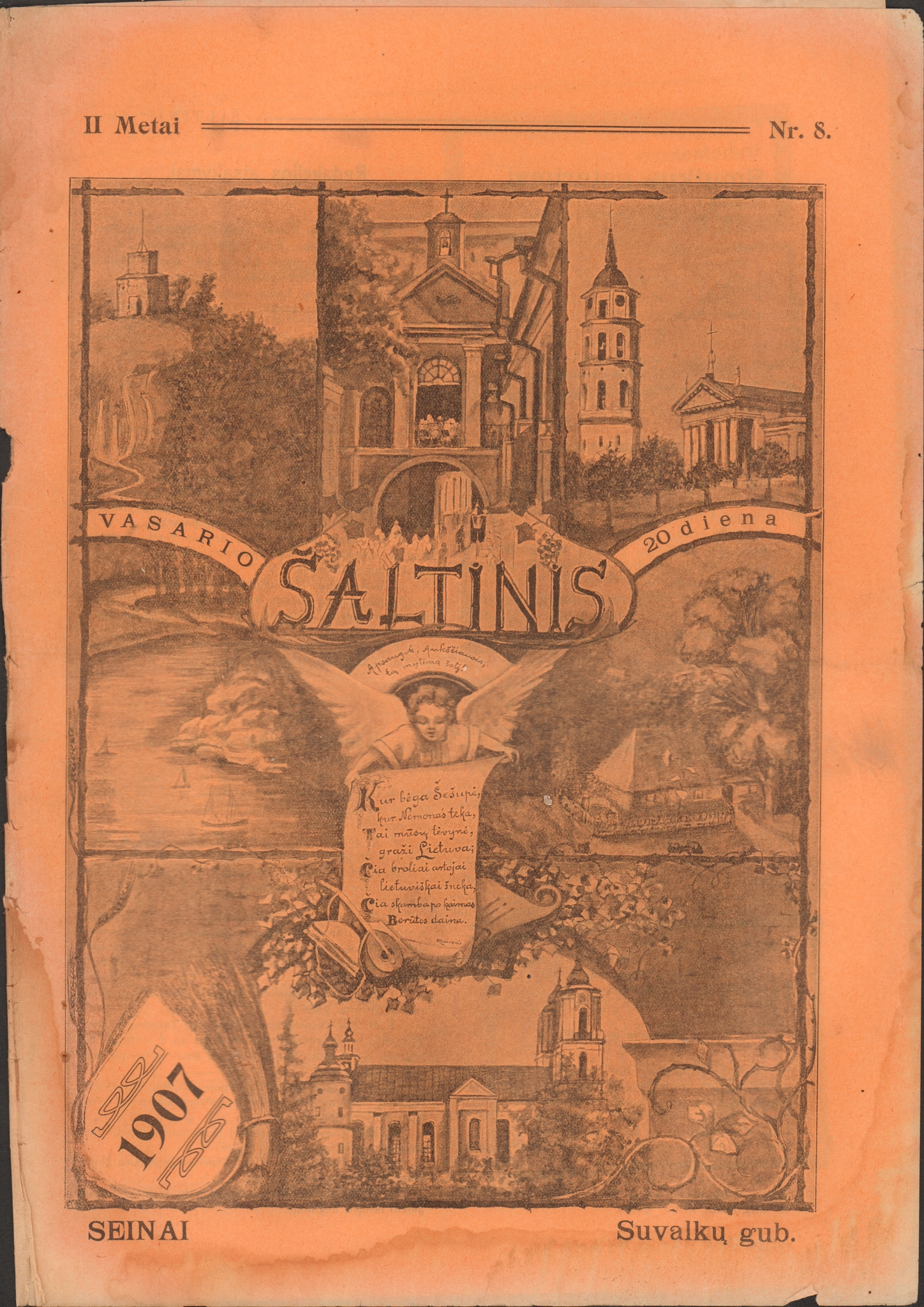
- Cover of 20 February 1907 issue (it depicts Gediminas Tower, Gate of Dawn, and Vilnius Cathedral at the top; cupid holding a scroll with a stanza by Maironis about Lithuania in the middle; Church of the Visitation in Sejny at the top)
- Type: Weekly Catholic newspaper
- Founder: Kazimieras Prapuolenis
- Founded: March 1906
- Ceased publication: August 1915
- Language: Lithuanian
- Headquarters: Sejny, Congress Poland
- Circulation: 15,000 (1914)

Šaltinis (transl. stream, source) was a Lithuanian-language weekly newspaper published in Sejny, then part of Congress Poland. It was an illustrated Catholic publication supported by the Lithuanian clergy and the professors and clerics at the Sejny Priest Seminary. The content focused on news, practical advice, and educational articles. It was the most popular Lithuanian periodical with circulation reaching 15,000 copies in 1914. Its weekly supplement, Šaltinėlis, became the first Lithuanian periodical dedicated to children.

First published in March 1906, the paper was discontinued in August 1915 due to World War I. It was resurrected twice: in 1926–1940 in Marijampolė and in 1961–1998 in Nottingham (United Kingdom) and Panevėžys.

== Sejny newspaper ==
=== Publication history ===
When the Lithuanian press ban was lifted in 1904, Kazimieras Prapuolenis petitioned the Tsarist government for a permit to publish Šaltinis. He initially wanted to publish the periodical in Vilnius, but eventually settled in Sejny. It was the seat of the Diocese of Sejny and had the Sejny Priest Seminary, a center of Lithuanian culture, but the town did not have a printing press. Sejny was at the southern border of Lithuanian-inhabited areas which presented logistical difficulties with distribution as well as gathering news and information in other parts of Lithuania.

Priests from the Dioceses of Sejny and Vilnius raised 20,000 rubles to establish the printing press and invite workers from Warsaw. The printing press was officially founded by Juozas Laukaitis, Vincas Dvaranauskas, and Jurgis Narjauskas. In addition to Šaltinis, the printing press published several other periodicals and 257 books, mostly in Lithuanian but also in Polish, Latin, and Esperanto. The printing press was evacuated to Russia during World War I. In early 1915, due to World War I, the newspaper relocated to Vilnius where issues 7 to 33 were published.

Initially, the newspaper struggled financially, but it changed once its editor became Juozas Vailokaitis. The newspaper competed with other Lithuanian periodicals, primarily Lietuvos ūkininkas, by lowering prices and organizing a lottery for its readers. In fall 1907, Šaltinis organized a lottery in which every subscriber was eligible to participate. The prizes were books, clocks, and large portraits of Pope Pius X. In December 1907, Šaltinis published 50,000 copies of its issues (up from 2,000 copies in 1906). Such a big jump in circulation was temporary, but the number of subscribers tripled. It became the most popular Lithuanian newspaper of the time with circulation reaching 15,000 copies around 1914.

=== Content ===
Šaltinis was first published in March 1906 and from 1907 became the main periodical of the Lithuanian Christian Democratic Party. Its name was taken from a title of a popular prayer book. It was published weekly and had 16 pages with its yellow covers being used for announcements and ads. It was aimed at the general public (farmers, villagers) and published news from Lithuania, Russia, and the world, educational articles on agriculture, education, culture, Lithuanian language as well as works of fiction. Initially, it had a one-page section dedicated to religion, but it was discontinued by 1909.

The newspaper published several supplements, including Šaltinėlis (little stream) for children, Vainikėlis (little wreath) for youth, Artojas (plowman) for farmers. Šaltinėlis, published from the second issue of Šaltinis, became the first Lithuanian periodical dedicated to children. It was a four-page weekly supplement that published fairy tales, poems, puzzles, tasks and games. It was an independent publication in 1911–1914. Artojas functioned as Žagrė Society, an agricultural cooperative established by the Catholic clergy.

=== Police troubles ===
Because there were no local Lithuanian-speaking censors, Russian censors received already published newspaper. Therefore, four times (all under editor Juozas Vailokaitis) the newspaper was subject to sanctions. In February 1908, Šaltinis published news about a rumored assassination plot against the Tsar. In August 1909, the newspaper published a complaint that Russian tax officials assessed unfair taxes on cooperatives when compared to regular shops. Both times Vailokaitis was fined (100 and 75 rubles, respectively) or could choose one-month prison sentence.

The third case was brought regarding an article criticizing land sales by the government to immigrant Russians which was prepared based on a speech of Andrius Bulota to the Russian State Duma. In court, Bulota personally defended Vailokaitis but he was still sentenced to three months in prison. The fourth case concerned a short story which depicted brutality of Russian policemen and prison wardens. Vailokaitis had to pay a fine of 150 rubles and spend four months in a monastery in Łomża.

=== Authors ===
Its authors and contributors included Juozas Balčikonis, Mečislovas Davainis-Silvestraitis, Mykolas Krupavičius, Marija Pečkauskaitė (Šatrijos Ragana), Justinas Bonaventūra Pranaitis, Sofija Pšibiliauskienė (Lazdynų Pelėda), Jonas Totoraitis, Justinas Staugaitis. In total, Šaltinis published texts by 215 authors in 1906, 380 authors in 380, 424 authors in 1908, 533 authors in 1909, 546 authors in 1910.

== Later resurrections ==
The newspaper was resurrected in 1926 in Marijampolė by the Congregation of Marian Fathers of the Immaculate Conception. It also resurrected the historical supplements Šaltinėlis and Artojas. Its circulation was 6,000 copies in 1933. The newspaper was discontinued after the Soviet occupation of Lithuania in June 1940. The newspaper was reestablished in Nottingham by priest Steponas Matulis in 1961. After Lithuania regained independence in 1990, the newspaper relocated to Panevėžys in 1993 where it was published until 1998. Its circulationwas 1,000 copies in 1993.

== Editors ==
The editors of Šaltinis were:

- Kazimieras Prapuolenis: 1906 vol. 1–3
- Juozas Laukaitis: 1906 vol. 4 – 1907 vol. 22
- Juozas Vailokaitis: 1907 vol. 23 – 1910 vol. 37
- Antanas Civinskas: 1910 vol. 38 – 1912 vol. 22
- Bronius Stosiūnas: 1912 vol. 23 – 1915 vol. 33
