= Lithuanian and Samogitian Charitable Society =

The Lithuanian and Samogitian Charitable Society (Lithuanian: Lietuvių ir žemaičių labdaringoji draugija or simply labdariai) was a charitable society active in Saint Petersburg in 1892–1918. For a time, it was only legal Lithuanian organization in the Russian Empire. It provided financial support to Lithuanian students and maintained a Lithuanian school attached to the Church of St. Catherine. It also organized Lithuanian cultural evenings with amateur theater performances, dances, songs. In 1895, it staged the first public Lithuanian play in the Russian Empire.

== Activities ==
At the end of the 19th century, Lithuanians moved to Saint Petersburg, then capital of the Russian Empire, for jobs and education. In 1900, Varpas estimated that there were about 10,000 Lithuanians in the city. According to the memoirs of Juozas Zauka, Lithuanians began organizing in 1880 but did not obtain official government approval for a society until 1892. The government approval for a charitable society was received on 25 September 1892. The founding meeting took place on 21 October 1892.

The society provided stipends and other support (e.g. food, clothing, shelter, aid in job search) to struggling Lithuanian and Samogitian students. It also maintained a Lithuanian school, hall for gatherings and lectures, small library with a reading room, and a choir. The school was attached to the Church of St. Catherine and educated about a hundred students (sixty boys and forty girls). When the Lithuanian press ban was lifted in 1905, the society supported the publication of Lietuvių laikraštis, the first Lithuanian periodical published legally in the Russian Empire.

In ten years from 1893 to 1902, the charitable society raised almost 25,000 rubles (4,410 rubles from membership fees, 15,560 rubles from cultural evenings, and other donations). At the same time, it spent 3,828 rubles to support students, 3,036 rubles on other charitable work, and 9,626 rubles to organize the cultural evenings.

== Cultural evenings ==
The society charged an annual membership fee of six Russian rubles. To raise further funds, the society organized quarterly cultural evenings with Lithuanian plays (usually, simple comedies), dances, songs by the choir. The first such evening was held in 1892 without proper permits in an apartment of a Lithuanian doctor. In February 1893, the first public evening was attended by 400 people. On 31 March 1895, it performed the first public Lithuanian play – a translated comedy Žentas dėl parodos (Son-in-Law for Show) by Józef Bliziński about a pretentious peasant family that wanted a noble son-in-law.

One of the plays, depicting the end of the harvest in Lithuania, involved more than 50 performers, singers and dancers in Lithuanian national costumes. Performers during these evenings included brothers Kipras and Mikas Petrauskas, Stasys Šimkus, Juozas Tallat-Kelpša who later became professional performers in independent Lithuania. Other participants included future painter Adomas Varnas and ophthalmologist Petras Avižonis.

== Similar societies ==
The charitable society was dominated by wealthier Lithuanians and members of the intelligentsia. Its membership fee was unaffordable to most Lithuanian workers. As a result, workers, servants, and others grew dissatisfied with the society and in 1899 established the Lithuanian Mutual Aid Society of Saint Petersburg (Lithuanian: Peterburgo lietuvių savitarpinės pašalpos draugija or simply savitarpiečiai). Linguist Kazimieras Būga was secretary and an active member of this society. This society was still too expensive and a third society known as the Lithuanian Mutual Aid Society for the Poor of Saint Petersburg (Lithuanian: Petrapilio mažturčių lietuvių savitarpinės pagalbos draugija or simply mažturčiai) was established in 1904.

== Members ==
The society was never a large organization. It had about 60 members in 1896, 100 in 1899, and 300 in 1917. Its founders and active members included Silvestras Baltramaitis, Jonas Mačiulis (Maironis), Aleksandras Dambrauskas (Adomas Jakštas).

The honorary chairman of the society was Jonas Jašmantas who obtained government approval for the society. Among its honorary members were Bishop of Samogitia Mečislovas Leonardas Paliulionis, Bishop of Lutsk-Zhytomyr Karol Antoni Niedziałkowski, professors Ignotas Baltrušis and Jonas Mačiulis (Maironis) of the Saint Petersburg Roman Catholic Theological Academy, secretary of the Mogilev Archdiocese Kazimieras Prapuolenis.

=== Chairmen ===
The society was chaired by:

- Petras Vileišis (1892–1895)
- Vincas Matulaitis (1895–1917)
- Blažiejus Česnys (1917)
- Adomas Spurga (1917)
- Gustavas Feterauskas (1918)

== See also ==
- Žiburėlis – illegal Lithuanian society established in 1893 to support students
