= Hermann Heinrich Ploss =

German gynecologist and anthropologist

Hermann Heinrich Ploss (8 February 1819, in Leipzig – 11 December 1885, in Leipzig) was a German gynecologist and anthropologist. He was full professor at the medical faculty of the University of Leipzig.

He published numerous works on sexual medicine and was considered as one of the founders of the comparative gynecology and pediatrics.

== Works ==
- Das Weib in der Natur- und Völkerkunde [Woman in Natural History and Ethnology]. 2 Volumes. Grieben, Leipzig, 1885.
