= Jonas Totoraitis =

Lithuanian Roman Catholic priest and historian

Jonas Totoraitis (24 December 1872 – 21 June 1941) was a Roman Catholic priest and historian.

== Education ==
Totoraitis studied at the Theological Seminary of Sejny. He went on to Freiburg University in Switzerland, where he published his doctoral dissertation on the life of King Mindaugas, Die Litauer unter dem König Mindowe bis zum Jahre 1263, the first such work by a Lithuanian scholar.

== Work ==
After returning to Lithuania he continued his historical researches and pastoral work, directed the Marian gymnasium in Marijampolė, and taught at Vytautas Magnus University.
