= Sejny Priest Seminary =

Catholic priest school in Sejny, Poland

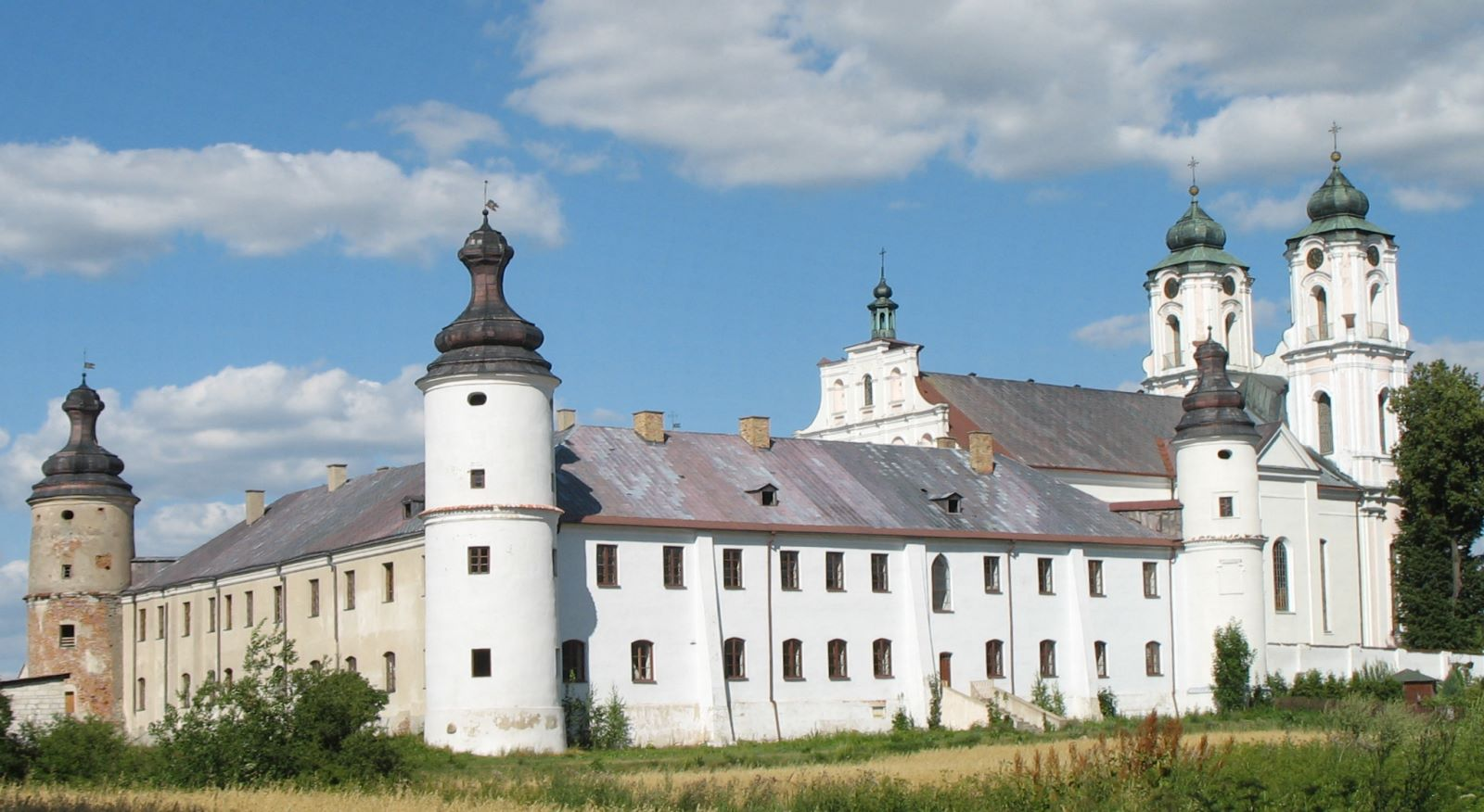
Buildings of former church, monastery, and priest seminary

The Sejny Priest Seminary or Sejny Theological Seminary (Lithuanian: Seinų kunigų seminarija) was a Catholic priest seminary established in Sejny (now Poland) in 1826. The courses lasted five years. Up until its dissolution in 1926, the seminary was an important center of Lithuanian culture, educating many prominent figures of the Lithuanian National Revival.

== History ==
The Sejny Seminary was established by bishop Mikołaj Jan Manugiewicz to address shortages of Lithuanian-speaking priests. At first the seminary was small. Later, when seminaries in Tykocin (1863) and Kielce (1893) were closed and merged, the Sejny Seminary grew to 60–80 students. A large portion of the students were sons of Lithuanian peasants from Suvalkija.

=== 20th century ===
In 1915, during World War I, the seminary was evacuated into Russia (first Mogilev, then Saint Petersburg). In 1919 the seminary returned to Sejny, but the town was at the center of the Polish–Lithuanian War. After the Polish seizure of Sejny after an uprising done by the Polish Military Organisation in August 1919, the Lithuanian students and faculty were expelled into Lithuania, where the seminary continued in Zypliai and Gižai. In 1926 the Sejny Seminary was renamed to Vilkaviškis Priest Seminary and ceased to exist.

== Alumni ==
- Mykolas Krupavičius, politician
- Vincas Kudirka, writer, founder of Varpas
- Vincas Mickevičius-Kapsukas, communist activist (expelled after a year)
- Vincas Mykolaitis-Putinas, writer
- Justinas Staugaitis, signatory of the Act of Independence of Lithuania
- Jonas Totoraitis, historian

== Sources ==
- Katilius, Algimantas, ed. (2009). Katalikų dvasininkijos rengimas Seinų kunigų seminarijoje: XIX a. - XX a. pradžia (in Lithuanian). Vilnius: Lietuvos istorijos instituto leidykla.
