= Antanas Vienažindys =

Lithuanian poet

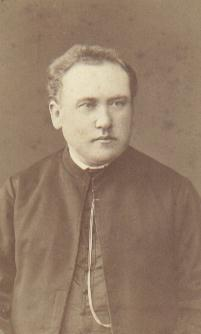
- Born: 26 September 1841; Anapolis Russian Empire
- Died: 29 July 1892 (aged 50); Laižuva, Russian Empire
- Other names: Vienužis (pen name); Antanas Vienožinskis
- Education: Varniai Priest Seminary
- Occupations: Catholic priest, poet

Antanas Vienažindys (1841–1892), also known by his pen name Vienužis, was a Lithuanian Roman Catholic priest and poet. While only a handful of his poems survive, he is considered the most famous Lithuanian poet between Antanas Baranauskas (1850s) and Maironis (1890s).

Born into a family of affluent Lithuanian peasants, Vienažindys was educated at the Panevėžys Gymnasium and Varniai Priest Seminary. Ordained as a priest in 1865, he was first assigned as a vicar to Šiaulėnai and Krinčinas. After a conflict with a local dean, he was reassigned to a poor parish in Vainutas and then to distant Braslaw. In 1876, he was reassigned to Laižuva where he rebuilt the parish church which burned down in 1884. It was an expensive red brick neo-Gothic church with two towers. Vienažindys died in Laižuva of stomach cancer in 1892.

Vienažindys wrote poems since he was a student at the priest seminary. He did not publish his poems and they spread by word of mouth and by manuscripts distributed to friends and relatives. They became popular among the Lithuanian people and folklorists have recorded more than 3,000 folk variations of his poems. Many Lithuanian folk songs and other poems are attributed to him, but only 27 poems are verifiably known to have been written by him. His first poetry collection was published posthumously in the United States in 1894.

His poetry is described as popular Romanticism. His earliest poems are joyful, light, and humorous. Later poems are increasingly sorrowful. They express grief and pain over losing a beloved after the Uprising of 1863, loneliness, and resignation. Influenced by Lithuanian folk songs and Polish and Russian sentimental romances, Vienažindys' poetry is valued as one of the first examples of intimate, personal, and subjective lyric poetry in Lithuanian poetry. He is also frequently cited as the first Lithuanian poet to write about romantic love.

== Biography ==
=== Early life and education ===
Vienažindys was born on 26 September [O.S. 14 September] 1842 in Anapolis located about 5 kilometres (3.1 mi) east of Rokiškis. He was the first out of five children born to a family of well-off Lithuanian peasants. His grandfather was a free peasant and owned 12 dessiatins of land in Gipėnai on the Sartai lake. His father Justinas Vienažindys rented folwark in Anapolis from the Plater family. After the Uprising of 1831, the folwark was confiscated by the Tsarist authorities and Justinas Vienažindys managed to buy it out. However, he died early and his widow remarried. As a result, the five children moved to live with their grandfather in Gipėnai.

It is unclear where Vienažindys received primary education as there is no record of him attending a primary school. In 1856, together with his brother Norbertas, he started high school education at the Panevėžys School for Nobles which was reorganized into the Panevėžys Gymnasium in 1858. School administration Polonized Vienažindys' last name to Wienożyński and therefore he is also known under Vienožinskis surname. In 1861, both brothers decided to transfer to Varniai Priest Seminary. After a year, Norbertas decided to pursue studies of mathematics at the Saint Petersburg University and left the seminary. Antanas' studies were interrupted by the Uprising of 1863. Tsarist officials wanted to conscript him into the Imperial Russian Army, but he managed to bribe the officials. When the uprising failed, Tsarist authorities implemented various Russification policies, including banning Lithuanian publications and moving the seminary from Varniai to Kaunas. Therefore, in February 1865, without having completed the full four years of studies, Vienožinskis was ordained as a priest. The Tsarist authorities also deported Rožė Stauskaitė, Vienažindys' love interest, and her family to the Samara Governorate for participating in the uprising.

=== Priesthood ===
In April 1865, Vienažindys was first assigned as a vicar to Šiaulėnai. After a year, he was reassigned to Krinčinas which was a seat of a deanery. Vienažindys became active in cultural life. He continued to read and collected a small library of mainly philosophical and theological works. He was particularly interested in the relationship between religion and science and works of French astronomer Camille Flammarion. He became known for his lively and emotional sermons. After 1868, the government strictly regulated who could deliver the sermons and their content. Thus, Vienažindys had to obtain a special permit. He wrote poetry, organized a church choir, distributed illegal Lithuanian publications, etc. His poetry became popular among the people, but was viewed with suspicion by the clergy as he wrote about love.

Pastor Tadas Lichodziejauskas from Paberžė was assigned as the new dean to Krinčinas in 1872. The two men did not get along as they held different views of priesthood. Lichodziejauskas was dogmatic and conservative, while Vienažindys was more emotional, impulsive, and social. He also enjoyed drinking alcohol. Lichodziejauskas began writing complaints to Bishop of Samogitia Motiejus Valančius. Vienažindys responded by writing an angry poem about Lichodziejauskas and Valančius. The bishop responded by reassigning Vienažindys to a poor and neglected parish in Vainutas and then to distant Braslaw in present-day Belarus in fall 1873. It was a large but mixed parish. There were constant conflicts and friction with the Eastern Orthodox priests over mixed marriages, baptisms, and funerals.

After Valančius' death in 1875, Vienažindys was returned to Lithuania and assigned as a parson to Laižuva in May 1876. There he worked to improve and enlarge pastor's farm and, as an enterprising farmer, he soon accumulated wealth. He liked luxurious and expensive things (good carriage, elegant furniture, crystal dishes, etc.), but also cared about his parish. He maintained contacts with various priests active in public life and participated in the distribution of the banned Lithuanian publications. Tsarist police became suspicious of his activities, Vienažindys avoided further troubles by bribing the policemen. He organized repairs of the clergy house and the leaky roof of the church. In 1884, the wooden church burned down and Vienažindys decided to rebuild a brick church. At the time, due to various Russification policies, the Tsarist government did not want to approve the construction of a new church but Vienažindys promised to finance the construction from personal funds and the permit was issued. It was a red brick neo-Gothic church with two towers. Materials were imported and specialists were hired from Latvia and Poland. The construction cost about 30,000 silver rubles. The church was consecrated in May 1892, but Vienažindys could not participate as he was terminally ill with stomach cancer. He became ill in fall 1891 and sought treatment in Riga, Tartu, Warsaw. He died on 29 August [O.S. 17 August] 1892. The church was destroyed by the Germans in 1944. The current church in Laižuva uses the building of a primitive hospital (špitolė) built by Vienažindys.

== Works ==
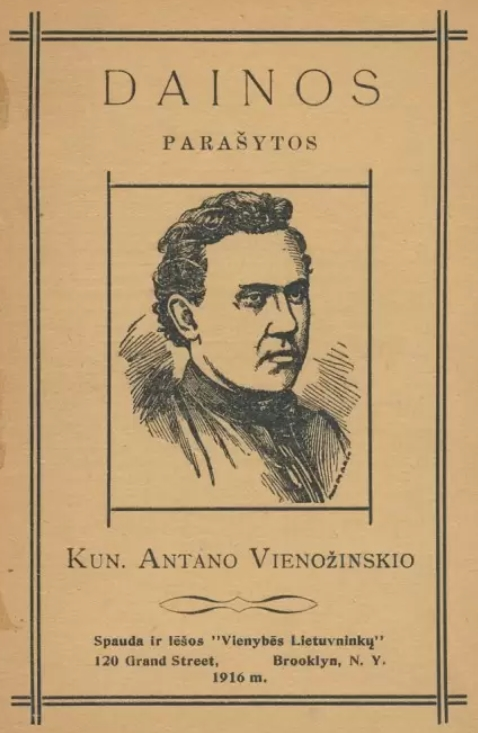
Cover of a collection of poems published in the United States in 1916

=== Publications ===
Vienažindys started writing poetry as a student at the priest seminary, but his first poem was published only in 1873. Polish ethnographer Edward Chłopicki in his article about his journey through Lithuania published in the weekly magazine Kłosy included a Polish translation of one poem by Vienažindys. Several poems sometimes attributed to Vienažindys were published in Lithuanian periodicals Varpas, Ūkininkas, and Vienybė lietuvninkų in late 1891 to 1893. At the time, Vienažindys was already terminally ill and the poems were signed by pen name Žemaituks (Samogitian) which was used to sign other poems as well. The first poetry collection was published in Plymouth, Pennsylvania, in 1894 by Juozapas Žebrys, vicar of Akmenė and Vienažindys' friend, who emigrated to the United States. Since then, his poetry was included in many different collections, anthologies, chrestomathies. One stanza in original Lithuanian was included in The Jungle, a 1906 novel by Upton Sinclair. His poetry and surviving letters were published in Vilnius in 1978.

Similar to Antanas Strazdas, poems by Vienažindys spread among the people by word of mouth and by manuscripts distributed to friends and relatives. Many poems and folk songs are attributed to Vienažindys but the true author is difficult to establish. Vienažindys left a manuscript with a compilation of 26 poems titled Dainos lietuvininko Žemaičiuose (Song of a Lithuanian in Samogitia). The manuscript is kept at Vilnius University Library. The poems are not titled; they are known by their first line. Most of these poems were written in his youth and later edited and corrected when he lived in Laižuva. One poem is known from a letter that he sent to a woman in Krinčinas. Another eight poems were collected from friends and relatives and are confirmed to be Vienažindys' texts by textological analysis. Many other poems are believed to have been lost because Vienažindys' manuscripts were not preserved. Mečislovas Davainis-Silvestraitis claimed that after the funeral, a gymnasium teacher from Warsaw selected almost one hundred of poems and other material from Vienažindys' archives and promised to write his biography. However, nothing further is known about these poems or the biography.

=== Themes ===
One of his muses and sources of inspiration was his love for Rožė Stauskaitė, a neighbor from Jaskoniškės. It appears that these feelings developed while Vienažindys was still a gymnasium student. The relationship ended when 17-year old Stauskaitė and her family were deported to the Samara Governorate in December 1863. Based on vague hints in letters and memoirs, some researchers believe that Vienažindys was also interested in Liudvika Niūniavaitė, a sister of a pastor in Tverai, who later married Vienažindys' brother Vincentas. Juozas Tumas-Vaižgantas claimed that poems composed later in life were intentionally destroyed by Vincentas as unsuitable for a priest.

Majority of the surviving poems were written in Vienažindys' youth. The earliest poems write about hopeful and joyful love, youthful beauty and energy. These poems include a light flirt with a love interest and a comical paraphrasing of the academic song Gaudeamus igitur. Only one of his love poems tries to reign in the feelings. Another set of poems deals with Vienažindys' experiences as a priest. Some of these poems express delight and admiration. Perhaps his most popular song "Kaipgi gražus gražus rūtelių darželis" (How lovely lovey rue garden) depicts a young woman describing her beautiful flower garden where she is the queen. She takes pure but naïve pride in her garden and names fourteen different flowers that grow in it. Others harshly criticize an alcoholic man, reflect on worries of a bride, or poke fun at a priest caught fraternizing with women. Inspiration for several of these songs can be traced to Lithuanian folk songs published by Simonas Daukantas and in Tygodnik Wileński.

Later, after experiences in 1863, the poems reflect painful longing, disappointment, and loneliness. Most vividly, he expresses sorrows about the separation from his deported beloved, but also writes about the separation from his family. Poems that are generally dated to the period when he lived in Braslaw are especially pessimistic and bleak. They describe past wounds, desperate desire to escape the misery, and thoughts that only death can bring peace. The lyrical subject seeks comfort in religion and the idea of soul's journey to heaven. In the last poem of the 26-poem collection (though it is likely written earlier than some other poems), the lyrical subject has resigned and lost all hope; it repeatedly states "It is the same to me" ("Man vis tiek pat"). The 26-poem manuscript was signed under the pen name Vienužis (meaning "vienišius" or "alone, solitary person").

=== Analysis ===
In his memoir, Vienažindys wrote that while he was a student at the priest seminary, he would lock himself in a closet, let himself experience intense emotions, and would come out with a new poem. Many of his poems express a sudden burst of intense emotion. The poems also express Vienažindys' concept of poetry: suffering produces poetry and song that provide comfort and solace. In another poem, Vienažindys refers to poems as his soul and asks them to cheer up not only the distant beloved but also rivers, forests, birds. As such, his poetry reflects experiences and emotions of an individual which makes it distinct from other popular poetry of the period. Most other poems had clear societal goals to propagate the ideas of the Lithuanian National Revival or encourage antigovernment sentiments. While Vienažindys' poems mention social inequality as well as injustices and hardships inflicted by the government, the poems express individual's pain and grief, and are not meant to incite public outrage. Vienažindys also wrote about love for his homeland, but these patriotic feelings are not grand and majestic declarations; they are personal and intimate adorations. As such, the poetry of Vienažindys is one of the first examples of personal lyrical poetry in Lithuania.

Vienažindys borrowed many lyrical elements from the Lithuanian folk songs, including repeating lines and using anaphora, drawing parallels between humans and animals or between human life and the cycles in the nature, using plentiful diminutives and personifications. It is likely that his poems were intended to be sung (he frequently referred to his poems as songs). As such, they became popular among the Lithuanian people. Folklorists have recorded more than 3,000 folk variations of his poems. However, Vienažindys was well educated and influenced by Polish and Russian sentimental romances. Specific similarities can be traced to works of Taras Shevchenko, Władysław Syrokomla, Aleksey Koltsov. As such, his poetry often features more complex compositions or rhymes. He more widely masculine endings (stress on the last syllable), iambic metre, varied stanzas with modifications to refrains. He wrote both in the traditional syllabic and the new accentual-syllabic verse which was perfected by Maironis. His rhyme and metre were not perfect; these imperfections were masked by the melody when singing. Vienažindys did not have formal musical education, but he was musically inclined – he could play a garmon and organized a church choir. Therefore, it is possible that he composed at least some of the melodies for his poems.

== Legacy ==
During his lifetime, Vienažindys was virtually unknown and unpublished. Only after World War I, Juozas Tumas-Vaižgantas collected material for his biography and published it together with other lectures on Lithuanian literature. A dedicated biography was published by Teresė Bikinaitė in 1989 and expanded, revised edition in 1996.

His grandparents' house in Gipėnai where Vienažindys grew up was turned into a small memorial museum in 1971. It is a private museum run and maintained by Vienažindys' relatives. A poetic play about Vienažindys Rožės pražydėjimas tamsoj (The Blooming of the Rose in Darkness) by Romualdas Granauskas was first staged in 1978 by the Lithuanian State Youth Theatre. A marble monument to Vienažindys by sculptor Gediminas Jokūbonis was erected in Mažeikiai in 1987.

The middle school in Laižuva was renamed after Vienažindys in 1997. At the same time, the school established a small museum dedicated to Vienažindys and local history. The school and the town organize annual events to commemorate his memory. Laižuva also treasures two objects reportedly related to Vienažindys: a large stone where he used to contemplate and an old linden tree under which ill Vienažindys fell down during the consecration of the newly built church in May 1872.

Vienažindys' memory is also commemorated in Krinčinas. In 1990 and 1991 (his 150th birth anniversary), about 300 birch trees were planted in town's park. The church has memorial plaque, stone, and traditional wood-carved column shrine erected in 1991–1992. In 2001, the primary school in Krinčinas was named after Vienažindys.

== Bibliography ==
- Aleksynas, Kostas (1978). "Antanas Vienažindys" (PDF). Kaipgi gražus gražus. By Vienažindys, Antanas (in Lithuanian). Vilnius: Vaga. pp. 5–20. OCLC 838415277.
- Bikinaitė, Teresė (1989). Antanas Vienažindys. Gyvenimas ir kūryba (in Lithuanian). Kaunas: Šviesa. ISBN 5-430-00155-4.
- Bikinaitė, Teresė (2017). "Summary" (PDF). Dainos lietuvininko Žemaičiuose. By Vienažindys, Antanas. Gyvoji poezija. Vilnius: Lietuvių literatūros ir tautosakos institutas. ISBN 978-609-425-226-6.
- Čepėnienė, Daiva (9 June 2021). "Antanas Vienažindys – kunigas, nepaisęs luomo nuostatų ir apie meilę kalbėjęs eilėmis" (in Lithuanian). Utenos apskrities žinios.
- Krikštaponis, Vilmantas (14 October 2011). "Liaudies dainiaus gyvenimo ir kūrybos takais… Kunigo ir poeto Antano Vienažindžio 170-osioms gimimo metinėms". XXI amžius (in Lithuanian). 74 (1954). ISSN 2029-1299.
- Kučinskienė, Aistė (2014). "Vienažindys". šaltiniai.info (in Lithuanian). Lietuvių literatūros ir tautosakos institutas, Vilniaus universiteto Filologijos ir Istorijos fakultetai.
- Malūkas, Vytautas (7 May 2016). "Antanas Vienažindys tebegyvena tarp laižuviškių" (in Lithuanian). Santarvė.
- Račkauskaitė, Vilma (2 March 2012). "A. Vienažindžio biografija". Žymūs Lietuvos žmonės: biobibliografinė duomenų bazė (in Lithuanian). Martynas Mažvydas National Library of Lithuania.
- Rumbinaitė, Raimonda (2000). "Apie slapyvardį, jo kilmę ir reikšmę" (PDF). Gimtasis žodis (in Lithuanian). 1. ISSN 0235-7151.
- Šešplaukis, Alfonsas (Summer 1977). "Lithuanians in Upton Sinclair's 'The Jungle'". Lituanus. 23 (2). ISSN 0024-5089.
- Subačius, Paulius (2001). "Antanas Vienažindys (1841–1892)" (PDF). In Girdzijauskas, Juozas (ed.). Lietuvių literatūros istorija: XIX amžius (in Lithuanian). Vilnius: Lietuvių literatūros ir tautosakos institutas. pp. 383–393. ISBN 9986513693.
