= Stanislovas Didžiulis =

Lithuanian bibliophile

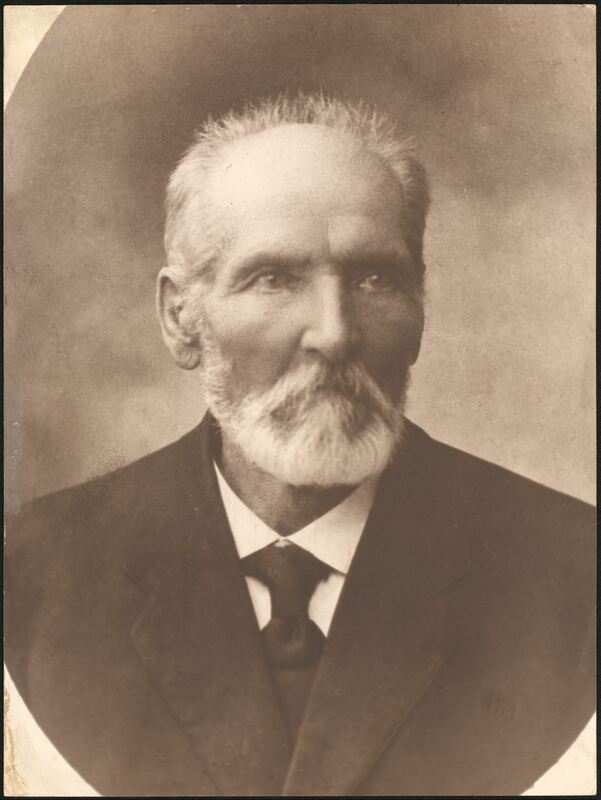
- Didžiulis in 1922
- Born: 26 November 1850; Griežionėlės, Russian Empire
- Died: 19 May 1927 (aged 76); Griežionėlės, Lithuania
- Spouse: Liudvika Didžiulienė
- Children: 9

Stanislovas Feliksas Didžiulis (1850–1927) was a Lithuanian bibliophile and book collector. His collection is estimated at 1,000 titles which made it the largest collection of Lithuanian and Lithuania-related books during the Lithuanian press ban.

The only son of local Lithuanian nobles, Didžiulis received only partial high school education at the Panevėžys Gymnasium before it was closed after the failed Uprising of 1863. He became passionate about collecting Lithuanian books even though post-1864 books were illegal in the Russian Empire. He supported Lithuanian book smugglers and worked with the Garšviai Book Smuggling Society to hide and distribute the prohibited books. He spent considerable time and effort tracking down old and rare Lithuanian books, corresponding with various activists and bibliophiles, and purchasing books from Kraków to Moscow. Since there were no Lithuanian libraries, Didžiulis' collection was used by various Lithuanian activists and researchers as an informal library. For his support of the Russian Revolution of 1905 and participation in the activities of the Social Democratic Party of Lithuania, Didžiulis and his son Antanas were sentenced to lifetime deportation to Siberia. An ailing old man, he was released after the February Revolution in 1917. He lived with his family in Yalta before returning to his native Griežionėlės in 1924 where he died in 1927.

Majority of Didžiulis' book collection was acquired by the University of Lithuania and Vaclovas Biržiška. After World War II, the books were divided among various Lithuanian institutions with Vilnius University Library received the largest portion of 230 books. A reconstructed catalog of the collection was published in 2004 and included 548 Lithuanian language works. This number includes about ten books that are the only known surviving copies.

== Biography ==
=== Early life ===
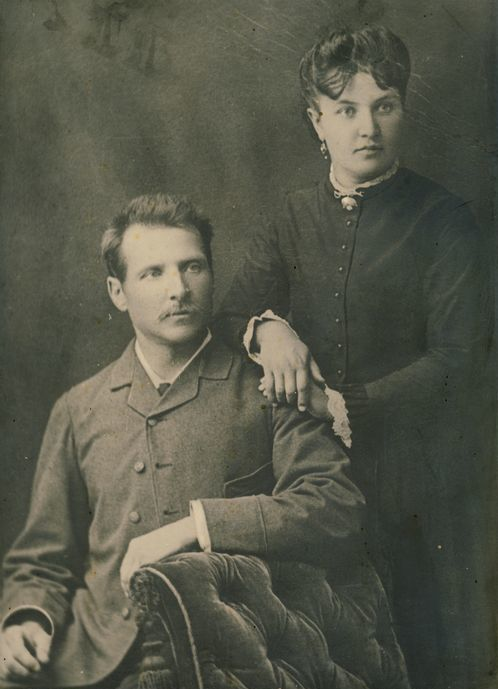
Didžiulis with his wife Liudvika in 1877

Didžiulis was born on 26 November [O.S. 14 November] 1850 in Griežionėlės near Andrioniškis in the present-day Anykščiai District Municipality. He was the only child of a local family of Lithuanian nobles that owned about 70 hectares (170 acres) of land. He completed three classes at the Panevėžys Gymnasium before it was closed after the failed Uprising of 1863. He was then educated privately by Antanas Viskantas, priest in Andrioniškis, who shared his interest in books with Didžiulis and encouraged him to start a personal library. Didžiulis later established contacts with other priests from Anykščiai area, including future bishops Antanas Karosas and Antanas Baranauskas. His ex libris reflected his changing identity: earliest books are marked with his full Polonized initial S. F. G. O. D. (Stanisław Feliks Giedgowt Oszmiański Dydziul) while later books were marked only with S. D. (Stanislovas Didžiulis).

Didžiulis inherited the manor in Griežionėlės after his father's death in 1874. In 1877, he married Liudvika Nitaitė who later became known as a writer and an activist. They had a total of nine children – five daughters and three sons grew to adulthood while one son died in infancy – but their marriage was not happy. While their shared their interest in Lithuanian language and culture, Didžiulis had several lovers and was stubborn even despotic. In 1896, Didžiulienė moved to Mitau (Jelgava) in present-day Latvia.

=== Activist and deportation ===
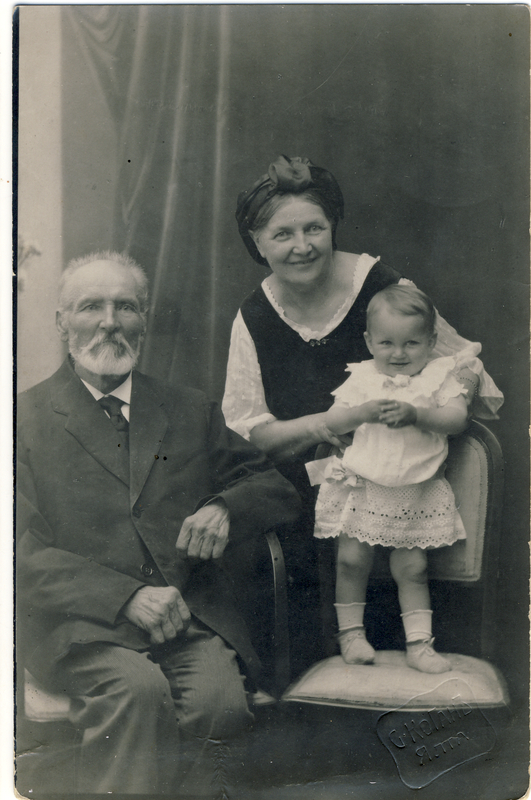
Didžiulis with his wife and granddaughter in 1922

Around 1875, Didžiulis became interested in Lithuanian folklore, particularly in Lithuanian folk songs. Some of the collected material was published in Tauta ir žodis in 1926. Later, Didžiulis helped hide and distribute the banned Lithuanian publications. He purchased 20 copies of each Aušra issue and distributed them in the area. He contributed articles to Aušra, Žemaičių ir Lietuvos apžvalga, Varpas.

He also worked with the Garšviai Book Smuggling Society (active in 1885–1895). Didžiulis was a member of the Lithuanian Literary Society in East Prussia and supported the Lithuanian and Samogitian Charitable Society in Saint Petersburg. In summer, their house was visited by various Lithuanian activists, including Jonas Jablonskis, Motiejus Čepas, Mečislovas Davainis-Silvestraitis, Liudvikas Vaineikis. In 1895–1896, he organized several petitions of local peasants to Tsar Nicholas II of Russia asking to lift the Lithuanian press ban. Afraid to be charged with a conspiracy, Didžiulis and others collected no more than 15 signatures per petition. When the ban was lifted in 1904, Didžiulis applied for a permit to open a Lithuanian, Polish, and Russian bookstore in Anykščiai but was denied because he was not politically reliable.

Didžiulis supported the Russian Revolution of 1905 and participated in the activities of the Social Democratic Party of Lithuania. His house was searched by the Tsarist police in February 1906 which found a hectograph and anti-Tsarist social democratic brochures. Didžiulis and his son Antanas were sentenced to lifetime deportation to Siberia in May 1908. After their appeals were denied, they were deported to the Irkutsk Governorate in April 1909. After a few years, Didžiulis was allowed to move near Kansk in the Krasnoyarsk Krai. He was released after the February Revolution in 1917 and moved to Yalta in Crimea where his wife Liudvika and daughter Vanda lived. He was ill and partially paralyzed and received treatments at local sanatoriums. The family was finally allowed to return to Lithuania in 1924. Didžiulis moved the native Griežionėlės where he died on 19 May 1927. He was buried on a hill in nearby Padvarninkai. His tombstone, an oak stump made of cement, was designed by Bernardas Bučas in 1933.

== Book collection ==
=== Book collector ===
Didžiulis started collecting books, especially in Lithuanian or about Lithuania, around 1870 and did so for about 30 years. At the time, due to the Lithuanian press ban, Lithuanian-language publications printed in the Latin alphabet after 1864 were illegal and there was no institution collecting or cataloging Lithuanian books. Didžiulis spent considerable amount of time and effort tracking down old and rare Lithuanian books and corresponding with other bibliophiles, including Adalbert Bezzenberger, Karol Estreicher, Jan Aleksander Karlowicz. He developed a closer working relationship with Silvestras Baltramaitis. Didžiulis was a frequent customer of the Zawadzki bookstore in Vilnius (about 100 books purchased in 1870–1883) and of the bookstore of Maurycy Orgelbrand in Warsaw (about 150 books purchased in 1877–1885). He was also a customer of book and antique stores in Kraków, Riga, Moscow, Saint Petersburg. He purchased or exchanged books with local Lithuanians. For example, he purchased newer prayer books and exchanged them for older and rarer editions. His interest in books did not diminish after the Lithuanian press ban was lifted in 1904, but his activities were interrupted by the arrest and deportation to Siberia. Even when Didžiulis was deported to Siberia, he continued to care about his collection. He wrote to his family asking them to safeguard the books and ensure that borrowed books were returned. He asked to mail him Lithuanian periodicals and new books so that he could keep up with Lithuanian cultural life.

=== Troubles with the police ===
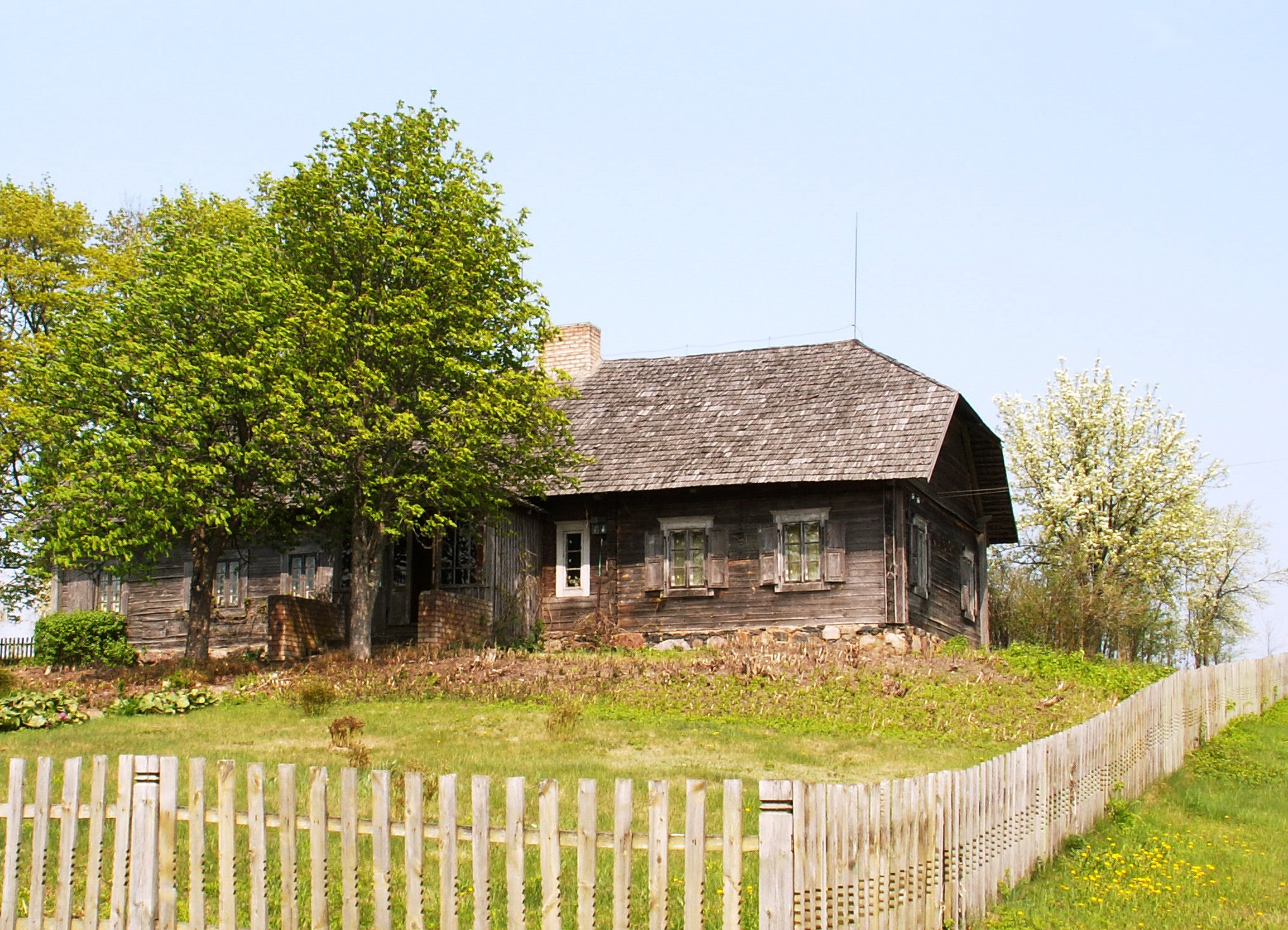
House of Didžiulis (now a museum) in Griežionėlės

Due to the Lithuanian press ban, Didžiulis had to split his collection into legal and illegal publications. The banned publications were hidden in wall cavity which was concealed by a large cupboard and which has survived to present day. Not discovered during police searches, it is the only surviving original hiding place of Lithuanian book smugglers. In 1884–1885, he petitioned Tsarist authorities for a permit to import books from East Prussia without getting each book approved by the Russian censors. He claimed that he was working on a bibliography of Lithuanian books from the 16th to the 19th century. Not only his requests were denied, but they also brought attention of the Tsarist police. His home was searched in April and October 1885. The police confiscated about 700 and 164 books, respectively. After several petitions, the books (other than four books prohibited in the Russian Empire) were returned to Didžiulis. This forced Didžiulis to ship publications via more politically reliable friends and acquaintances. His home was searched again in 1905–1906. Once again, the police confiscated books but Didžiulis managed to get them back.

=== Content and fate of the collection ===
Didžiulis collection is estimated at 1,000 titles which made it the largest collection of Lithuanian and Lithuania-related books during the Lithuanian press ban. A reconstructed catalog of the collection was published in 2004 and included 548 Lithuanian language works. This number includes about ten books that are the only known surviving copies. Other books included German, Polish, Russian works on Lithuanian language or history. The personal library included other miscellaneous books in other languages (Latvian, Belarusian, French, Latin) and other topics (hygiene, medicine, home economics, fiction) that were of interest to other family members. The collection also included several unpublished manuscripts and handwritten copies of published books.

Since there were no Lithuanian libraries, Didžiulis' collection was used by various Lithuanian activists and researchers (including Antanas Baranauskas, Jonas Jablonskis, Liudas Vaineikis, Juozas Otonas Širvydas, Jonas Basanavičius, Jurgis Šlapelis, Mečislovas Davainis-Silvestraitis, Mykolas Biržiška) as well as local residents.

After Lithuania regained independence in 1918, the book collection was cared mostly by Didžiulis' son Vytautas. Working with Vaclovas Biržiška, Vytautas sold 323 books at 10 litas per book to the University of Lithuania in 1930. Most other books were acquired by Biržiška for his personal library. When he escaped the advancing Red Army in 1944, the books ended up in the library of Kaunas University. After the university was closed in 1950, the collection was spread out among various institutions, including Vilnius University Library (largest set of 230 books), Kaunas University of Technology, Kaunas University of Medicine, public libraries in Kaunas, and others. A handful of books remained in Griežionėlės and were donated to the Library of the Lithuanian Academy of Sciences or became part of the memorial museum established in 1968.

== Legacy ==
In 1940, Vytautas the Great War Museum erected a wall to commemorate Lithuanian book smugglers. Didžiulis was included among the hundred names on the wall. The wall was demolished by the Soviet authorities in 1950 but rebuilt in 1997.

After several petitions by Didžiulis' family, Soviet authorities established a memorial museum in Griežionėlės in 1968.

In 2007, the public library of the Anykščiai District Municipality was renamed after Didžiulis and his wife Liudvika Didžiulienė.

== Bibliography ==
- Anykštėnų biografijų žinynas (24 October 2019). "Stanislovas Feliksas Didžiulis" (in Lithuanian). Pasaulio anykštėnų bendrija.
- Anykštėnų biografijų žinynas (5 April 2022). "Liudvika Didžiulienė" (in Lithuanian). Pasaulio anykštėnų bendrija.
- Butkuvienė, Anelė (2007). "Didi Lietuvos mylėtoja". Garsios Lietuvos moterys (in Lithuanian). Baltos lankos. pp. 243–252. ISBN 978-9955-23-065-6.
- Lietuvninkaitė, Nijolė (2004). Stanislovo Didžiulio asmeninė biblioteka: katalogas (in Lithuanian). Kaunas: Technologija. ISBN 9955-09-790-6.
- Merkys, Vytautas (1994). Knygnešių laikai 1864–1904 (in Lithuanian). Vilnius: Valstybinis leidybos centras. ISBN 9986-09-018-0.
- Žukas, Vladas (13 July 2021) [2018]. "Stanislovas Didžiulis". Visuotinė lietuvių enciklopedija (in Lithuanian). Mokslo ir enciklopedijų leidybos centras.
