= Raudys =

Raudys is a surname. Notable people with the surname include:

- Aistis Raudys, Lithuanian computer scientist
- Šarūnas Raudys (born 1941), Lithuanian computer scientist and mathematician
