= Juozas Balčikonis Gymnasium =

Coordinates: 55.7329°N 24.3573°E

Juozo Balčikonio gimnazija
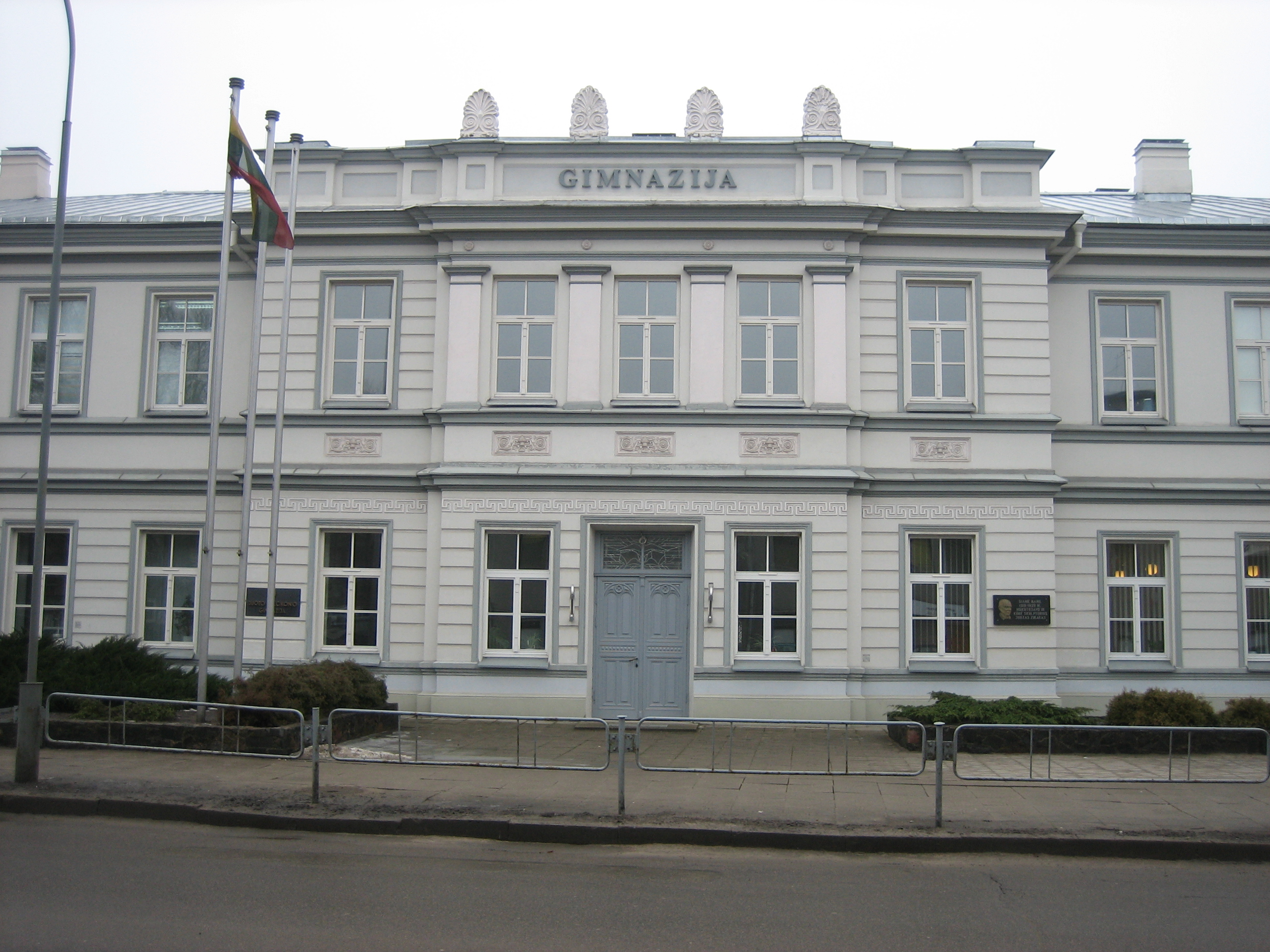
- Respublikos g. 47, Panevėžys, Lithuania

Information
- Motto: Būkime esmės žmonėmis ("Be the Men of Essence")
- Established: 1727
- Headmaster: Raimondas Dambrauskas
- Enrollment: 777
- Website: jbg.lt

Juozas Balčikonis Gymnasium (Lithuanian: Juozo Balčikonio gimnazija) is a secondary state school located in Panevėžys, Lithuania. It claims to be a successor of a former school of Piarists, established in 1727, making it the oldest gymnasium type school in Lithuania. The first institution established in the current building, the real school, started in 1884. Juozo Balčikonio gimnazija is always one of the top-ranked institutions in Lithuania for the high quality of its teaching, long lasting traditions and notable alumni.

== History of names ==
- School of Piarists – 1727–1832
- School of Gentries – 1841–1865
- Real school – 1882–1915
- Panevėžys Gymnasium – 1915–1949
- Secondary School No. 1 – 1949–1970
- Juozas Balčikonis Secondary School – 1970–1992
- Juozas Balčikonis Gymnasium – 1970–current

== Notable alumni ==
=== Ministers and prime ministers ===
- Antanaitis Vaidotas
- Birulis Kostas
- Jankevičius Juozas
- Juodakis Petras
- Masiliūnas Jonas
- Šakenis Konstantinas
- Juozas Urbšys
- Jonas Černius
- Gintautas Paluckas, PM

=== Diplomats ===
- Stasys Antanas Bačkis
- Jasinevičius Raimundas
- Morkvėnas Rimantas
- Juozas Urbšys
- Klevečka Rimutis

=== Public figures ===
- Cesevičius Domas
- Stanislovas Didžiulis
- Domaševičius Adolfas-Damušis
- Dausa Kazys
- Jurgutis Vytautas
- Jurskis Algirdas
- Macijauskas Antanas
- Skuodis Vytautas
- Šilas Povilas
- Vaišvilaitė Irena
- Vaitiekūnas Lionginas
- Petras Vileišis

=== Writers and publicists ===
- Antanaitis Algirdas Titus
- Astrauskas Gediminas
- Babickas Petras
- Barauskas-Barėnas Kazys
- Būtėnas Vladas-Ramojus
- Čerkesas Juozas-Besprnis
- Čibas Daumantas
- Dauguvietis Borisas
- Drevinis Paulius
- Graičiūnas Jonas
- Inčiūra Kazys
- Inčiūra Kazys-Pranas
- Jokubka Jonas Stanislovas
- Jonuška Vincas
- Keliuotis Juozas
- Kesiūnas Povilas
- Petrulis Juozas
- Račiūnas Simas
- Henrikas Radauskas
- Raila Bronys
- Rutkauskas Benediktas-Rutkūnas
- Balys Sruoga
- Rapolas Šaltenis
- Šukys Jonas
- Tamašauskaitė Vanda-Frankienė-Vaitkevičienė
- Teofilis Tilvytis
- Zaborskaitė Vanda
- Zupka Kazys-Kecioris

=== Philologists ===
- Balkevičius Jonas
- Jurgutytė Liucija-Baldauf
- Lyberis Antanas
- Skardžius Pranas
- Subatniekas Valteris
- Šukys Jonas
- Valkūnas Leonas

=== Architects, painters, sculptors ===
- Bielinskis Feliksas
- Bernardas Bučas
- Stasys Eidrigevičius
- Gaidamavičiūtė Violeta
- Garbauskas Antanas
- Gudelis Vytautas
- Jokūbonis Gediminas
- Jusionis Stasys
- Kerbedis Stanislovas
- Remigijus Kriukas
- Naruševičius Kazys
- Navakas Vaclovas Algimantas
- Ničius Algirdas
- Pazukaitė Vanda
- Algirdas Petrulis
- Puodžiukaitytė Giedrė
- Sklėrius Kajetonas
- Stepanka Albertas
- Laurynas Gucevičius
- Švipas Vladas
- Domicėlė Tarabildienė
- Žoromskis Kazimieras

=== Members of the Seimas ===
- Rimantas Astrauskas
- Stasys Balčas
- Kazys Bizauskas
- Vincas Kvieska
- Dangutė Mikutienė
- Gabrielė Petkevičaitė-Bitė
- Alfonsas Petrulis
- Salomėja Stakauskaitė
- Konstantinas Šakenis
- Kazimieras Steponas Šaulys
- Ignacas Uždavinys
- Albinas Vaižmužis

=== Clergy ===
- Balčys Kęstutis Robertas
- Barauskas Bronius
- Bikinas Juozapas, publicist
- Čiplys Kazimieras-Vijūnas, writer
- Jatulevičius Paulius-Jatulis, historian
- Juodelis Jonas, dr.
- Antanas Juška, dr.
- Jonas Katelė
- Kuzminskas Kazimieras
- Legeckas Petras
- Lipnickas Alfonsas-Lipniūnas
- Meškauskas Juozas, prof.
- Narbutas Titas, publicist
- Paliulionis Mečislovas
- Rimkevičius Petras, poet
- Sereika Feliksas
- Juozapas Skvireckas
- Valantinas Antanas, poet
- Antanas Vienažindys, poet
- Zaremba Leonas, prof.
- Žitkevičius Vincas-Vincas Stonis, poet

=== Athletes ===
- Jonas Kazlauskas
- Vitoldas Masalskis
- Rimantas Plungė
- Raimundas Sargūnas

=== Academics and teachers ===
- Kuzma Vladas
- Jablonskis Konstantinas
- Lebedev Aleksandr
- Juozas Balčikonis
- Pakarklis Povilas
- Brazdžiūnas Povilas
- Jurginis Juozas
- Vanagas Vladas Eimutis
- Gudelis Vytautas
- Rajeckas Raimundas
- Rajeckas Valentinas
- Marcinkevičius Algimantas
- Pragarauskas Henrikas
- Krotkus Arūnas
- Laurinčikas Antanas
- Tamošiūnas Vytas
- Raudys Šarūnas
- Birulia Aleksandr
- Baleišis Vladas
- Bizauskas Kazimieras
- Bortkevičius Silvestras
- Bulzgys Juozas
- Dambrauskas Aleksandras-Jakštas
- Daugaravičius Antanas
- Dilka Vincas
- Gabulaitė Elena
- Grigonis Matas
- Jonas Jablonskis
- Jovaiša Kazys
- Kairiūkštis Vytautas
- Karka Mykolas
- Kliuksinas Karolis
- Kuodys Leonas
- Maksimaitienė Ona
- Paulauskas Vladas
- Gabrielė Petkevičaitė-Bitė
- Puodžiukaitis Benediktas
- Puronas Bronius
- Puzinas Povilas
- Rukša Antanas
- Salomėja Stakauskaitė
- Stakauskas Juozapas
- Truncė Kazimieras
- Urbas Dominykas
- Vaitkevičius Antanas
- Variakojis Vilius
- Juozas Zikaras
