= Edmund Veckenstedt =

German author, historian and folklorist

Edmund Veckenstedt (1840–1903) was a German educator, ethnologist and folklorist who published many works, sometimes under the pseudonym Heinrich Veltheim.

Albert Edmund Veckenstedt was born in Vehlitz, near Magdeburg, on 7 January 1840. His career began as an educator, specializing in languages, but his attention soon turned to the field of folklore and then onto research of European ethnology. He was a member of anthropological and ethnological societies in Berlin, and published many papers on these and philological subjects in distinguished journals. He died in 1903 at Halle.

Veckenstedt dedicated his work Wendische Sagen, Märchen und abergläubische Gebräuche to Rudolf Virchow.

In 1883, he published two volumes of Samogitian folk tales. He did not speak Lithuanian or Samogitian and many of the tales were proved to be falsifications by Jan Aleksander Karłowicz and Mečislovas Davainis-Silvestraitis.

== Works ==
Veckenstedt was editor of the journal Sphinx, later an illustrated weekly Von Nah und Fern, and founded the folklore journal Zeitschrift für Volkskunde

His list of works includes,

- Regia potestas quae fuerit apud Homerum, Diss. Halle 1867
- Der Apollo von Belvedere, Cottbus 1870
- Die wendischen Volkssagen der Niederlausitz, in: Verhandlungen der Berliner Gesellschaft für Anthropologie, Ethnologie und Urgeschichte 1877, S. 93-111.
- Der Wendenkönig und die Boža-łosć, in: ibid. 1878, S. 162-182.
- Wendische Sagen, Märchen und abergläubische Gebräuche, Graz 1880.
- Die Geschichte der Gil-Blas-Frage, Berlin 1880.
- Ganymedes, Libau 1882.
- Die Mythen, Sagen und Legenden der Žamaiten (Litauer), 2 Bde., Heidelberg 1883.
- Fünfundzwanzig Jahre zur See. Tagebuch des Capitän (Waterschout) J. F. Inge zu Libau, Leipzig 1885.
- Pumphut, ein Kulturdämon der Deutschen, Wenden, Litauer und Žamaiten, Leipzig 1885.
- Sztukoris, der Till Eulenspiegel der Litauer und Žamaiten, und Schut Fomka, sein russisches Ebenbild, Leipzig 1885.
- Geschichte der griechischen Farbenlehre, Paderborn 1888 (ND Hildesheim 1973). (Hg.),
- Zeitschrift für Volkskunde, Vol. 1-4, Leipzig 1888-1892.
- La musique et la danse dans les traditions des Lithuaniens, des Allemands et des Grecs, Paris 1889.
- Das Paradies und die Bäume des Paradieses, sowie ihre angeblichen Ebenbilder bei den Chaldäern, Persern, Indern, Griechen, Nordgermanen und Norddeutschen nach Religion, Mythologie, Meteorologie, Naturwissenschaft und Volksanschauung, Halle 1896.
