= Aistis Raudys =

Latvian computer scientist

- Occupation: Computer Scientist
- Father: Šarūnas Raudys

Academic background
- Education: Vilnius University - Bachelor of Informatics, Doctor of Informatics, Institute of Mathematics and Informatics and Kaunas University of Technology - Master of Informatics

Academic work
- Discipline: Informatics / Computer Science with a specialization in AI and applied computational methods.

Aistis Raudys is a Lithuanian computer scientist and researcher in artificial intelligence. He holds separate positions at Vilnius University: professor in the Faculty of Mathematics and Informatics' Department of Computer Science, and project expert at the Institute of Data Science and Digital Technologies.

Over the course of his career, he has held senior research and leadership roles in both academia and industry. His main interests include: artificial intelligence, machine learning, large language models, financial intelligence, and data analysis.

== Career ==
Raudys has a PhD in informatics from Vilnius University's Institute of Mathematics and Informatics. He is also a professor at the Faculty of Mathematics and Informatics and has worked on many research projects that use artificial intelligence in finance, robotics, speech processing, and transport optimization. In addition to his teaching and research duties, he provides expert academic consultation through Vilnius University's Faculty of Mathematics and Informatics, contributing to applied research evaluation and AI-related expertise.

He has managed projects that got funding from big European research programs like Eurostars, Norway Grants, MITA, and Horizon Europe. Raudys has also been Chief Executive Officer of AAI Labs, a company focusing on AI solutions such as predictive analytics, large language models, and algorithmic trading. He has presented his research at international conferences and academic workshops focusing on artificial intelligence, algorithmic trading, and data analysis. He was profiled in Lithuanian business media as the founder and manager of an algorithmic trading fund. In interviews with independent business and technology media, he has discussed the use of algorithms in financial markets, emphasizing the strengths and limitations of automated decision systems and the role of human oversight. He has also given guest lectures to graduate students at Kaunas University of Technology, where he showed how artificial intelligence and data science are used in research and industry. Raudys has shared his knowledge with students and professionals, discussing the applications of AI and data science in various fields. His work and expertise have been recognized in the industry, and he continues to contribute to the development of AI solutions and algorithmic trading.

Outside academia, Raudys has been active in entrepreneurship. In 2018, he co-founded the applied artificial intelligence company Taikomasis dirbtinis intelektas (operating as AAI Labs) together with Tadas Šubonis, and has led the company.

One of the company's early projects was Wittykiosk, a voice-enabled “smart receptionist” kiosk intended for large office buildings. In 2019, Lithuanian media reported that a Wittykiosk-built AI assistant was being installed for the Business Stadium West business centre in Vilnius, enabling visitors to obtain information and assistance via voice interaction (Lithuanian and English) and other on-site services.

Raudys has been pretty active when it comes to teaching and sharing knowledge around the world. In 2023, he was invited to visit the University of Granada, which has a campus in Ceuta, Spain. During his visit, he shared his experience and ideas about teaching and researching artificial intelligence with the local universities and colleges.

== Research and contributions ==
Raudys's research focuses on artificial intelligence and how it can be used in finance, machine learning, neural networks, energy forecasting, and intelligent transport systems. He has published extensively in peer-reviewed journals and presented his work at international conferences.

He contributes to AI education through courses and seminars on artificial intelligence, large language models, machine learning, and financial intelligence. Raudys has taught AI courses at Vilnius University and given workshops to students and professionals around the world, supporting the development of AI expertise in Lithuania.

Raudys shares his knowledge with others through public training courses and lectures on artificial intelligence, machine learning, and data analysis for students and professionals. and he has also contributed to international discussions on sustainable computing and urban digital transformation. His work has even been highlighted by the Arqus European University Alliance, particularly when it comes to understanding digital transition and sustainable AI-driven systems.

== Doctoral research ==
On January 5, 2003, Raudys successfully defended his doctoral dissertation, "Feature extraction using neural networks”, at the Institute of Mathematics and Informatics.

== Education ==
- Doctor of Informatics, Institute of Mathematics and Informatics, Vilnius, Lithuania, 2003
  - Dissertation: Feature Extraction Using Neural Networks
- Master of Informatics, Kaunas University of Technology, Lithuania, 1997
- Bachelor of Informatics, Vilnius University, Lithuania, 1999

== Selected publications ==
Raudys has authored and co-authored numerous peer-reviewed journal articles, conference papers, and book chapters in the fields of artificial intelligence, finance, and data analysis.

- Raudys, A., et al. (2025). Exploring Generative Adversarial Networks: Comparative Analysis of Facial Image Synthesis. IEEE Access.
- Raudys, A., & Gaidukevičius, J. (2024). Forecasting Solar Energy Generation and Household Energy Usage. Energies.
- Raudys, A., & Goldstein, E. (2022). Forecasting Detrended Volatility Risk Using LSTM and XGBoost. Journal of Risk and Financial Management.
- Raudys, S., Raudys, A., & Pabarskaitė, Z. (2018). Dynamically Controlled Length of Training Data for Sustainable Portfolio Selection.

His Google Scholar Publication profile includes all articles he has worked on.

== Conferences and Public Engagement ==
Raudys has shared his research at universities and conferences around the world, including places in Europe and Africa, talking about artificial intelligence, using algorithms to trade, and analyzing data. He's also written articles for national media outlets about artificial intelligence, discussing how well it works and how it should be regulated. His work is helping to shape the conversation about AI and its impact on our lives. By presenting his findings to international audiences, Raudys is contributing to a global discussion about the potential of artificial intelligence to transform industries and improve our daily lives.

Raudys has given talks at big international events about artificial intelligence, like the AI Summit in Europe.He also spoke at a conference in Lithuania that focused on the Applications of Artificial Intelligence.This conference was the first of its kind in Lithuania and brought together people to share ideas about how to use artificial intelligence in real-life situations.
