= Stefania Ulanowska =

Belarusian ethnographer and folklorist (c. 1839 – aft. 1912)

- Стэфанія Уланоўская
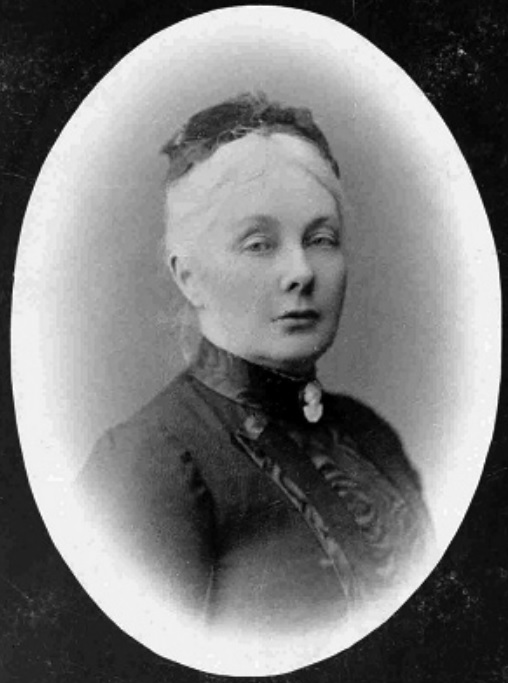
- Ulanowska c. 1912
- Born: c. 1839; Belarus
- Died: Aft. 1912
- Occupations: Ethnographer, folklorist and writer
- Notable work: Łotysze Inflant Polskich a w szczególności gminy wielońskiej, powiatu rzeżyckiego: obraz etnograficzny (1891-1895)
- Spouse: Władysław Ulanowski (m. 1860, d. 1873)
- Children: 1

Stefania Ulanowska (née Bolewska; Belarusian: Стэфанія Уланоўская, c. 1839 – aft. 1912) was a Belarusian ethnographer, folklorist and writer. She is most known for her work on Latvian culture and the Latgalian language.

== Family ==
Ulanowska was born about 1839 in Belarus, but her exact date and place of birth is unknown. Her father was Edmund Bolewski, and her mother was Józefa Gacaska. Her father died when she was a child and her mother worked as a teacher.

Ulanowska married Władysław Ulanowski on 2 June 1860 in Maryenhau. In 1862, she lived with her husband and their son Adam Ulanowski in Vilnius, Vilna Governorate, Russian Empire. Her husband participated in the January Uprising in 1863, after which the family property was confiscated and he was exiled to Russia. After her husband returned from exile in 1871, the family moved to Kraków in the Kingdom of Galicia and Lodomeria. Her husband died from cholera two years later, on 1 August 1873, then Ulanowska and her son left for Latvia.

In 1890, Ulanowska's son married and moved to Moscow, Russian Empire, to work as a government official. After the birth of her grandson, Ulanowska visited the family in Moscow and stayed living there, teaching students privately in French and music and financially supporting her son. While in Moscow, she subscribed to Polish newspapers.

== Ethnography ==
While living in Kraków, Ulanowska collected folklore materials for the Polish Academy of Arts and Sciences. When she was in Lativa, she sent objects from amateur archaeological excavations to the academy.

In 1884, Ulanowska published Symbolika wiosenna (Spring symbolism), which included a reconstructed image of the folk idea of spring and the symbolism of flora and fauna. She also wrote of the “wściekła polka” dance performed by mountaineers from the regions of Rabka.

From 1891 to 1895, Ulanowska published Łotysze Inflant Polskich a w szczególności gminy wielońskiej, powiatu rzeżyckiego: obraz etnograficzny, three volumes of ethnographic observations of Latvians living in the eastern part of Latvia. Her work detailed their beliefs, fairytales, folklore, language, traditional culture and religion and included her own translations of songs, proverbs and riddles from Latgalian to Polish. She collected material for the three volumes in the small town Viļāni.

Ulanowska was a correspondent of Polish ethnographers Izydor Kopernicki [pl] and Jan Karłowicz. Her works were published by the Academy of Learning.

== Later life ==
Ulanowska is thought to have returned to Belarus before 1912, but her date and place of death are unknown.

A dictionary was produced based on Ulanowska's lexicographical analysis of folktales in 2024.
