= Mečislovas Davainis-Silvestraitis =

Lithuanian writer and book smuggler

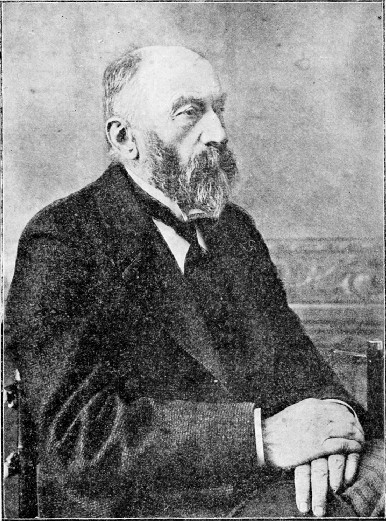
- Born: 20 April 1849; Žieveliškė, Russian Empire
- Died: 31 May 1919 (aged 70); Vilnius, Second Polish Republic
- Burial place: Rasos Cemetery
- Other names: Mečislovas Dovoina-Silvestravičius; Mieczysław Dowojna-Sylwestrowicz (Polish)
- Movement: Lithuanian National Revival
- Relatives: Brother-in-law Jonas Šliūpas

Mečislovas Davainis-Silvestraitis (Polish: Mieczysław Dowojna-Sylwestrowicz; 20 April 1849 – 31 May 1919) was a Lithuanian journalist, poet, publicist, folklorist, and book smuggler during the Lithuanian National Revival, best known for his collection of Lithuanian folklore.

Born to a family of petty Lithuanian nobles in Samogitia, Davainis-Silvestraitis was proud of his heritage. However, he showed little interest in working the inherited manor and accumulated debts. Having completed only three years of secondary education, he was interested in Lithuanian history, culture, and folklore. He collected about 700 folk tales, 250 folk songs, 500 short folklore sayings, 600 spells, 1,000 descriptions of folk medicine and medicinal herbs – most of which was collected in 1883–1890 in the area around Raseiniai. With the help of Jonas Basanavičius, he published a booklet with ten tales and five songs in 1889 and a collection of 159 folk remedies in 1898. With the help of Jan Aleksander Karłowicz, he published two volumes of Lithuanian folk tales translated into Polish in 1894. His work helped to prove that Lithuanian folk tales published by Edmund Veckenstedt in 1883 were falsified. Davainis-Silvestraitis also contributed articles to Polish, Russian, and English journals on ethnographic topics.

Debts forced him to give up the manor in 1891 and start a nomadic life in search of means of living. He struggled financially and took assorted jobs. In 1904, he settled in Vilnius and joined the Lithuanian cultural life becoming a members of various Lithuanian societies. He was one of the organizers of the Great Seimas of Vilnius but started drifting away from the Lithuanian public life due to anti-nobility attitudes. He edited and published the Polish-language newspapers Litwa (1908–1914) and Lud (1912–1913) that were aimed at Polish-speaking nobles and peasants in hopes that they could be convinced to "return" to their Lithuanian roots. However, the newspapers offered no new ideas and did not become popular.

During his life, Davainis-Silvestraitis contributed texts to numerous Lithuanian periodicals, including Aušra (82 texts in 1883–1886), Vienybė lietuvninkų (a paid correspondent in 1891–1896), Lietuvių laikraštis (briefly worked as an editorial staff in 1904–1905). He also wrote romantic poetry and published two booklets with his poems in 1884 and 1904.

== Biography ==
=== Early life and folklore studies ===
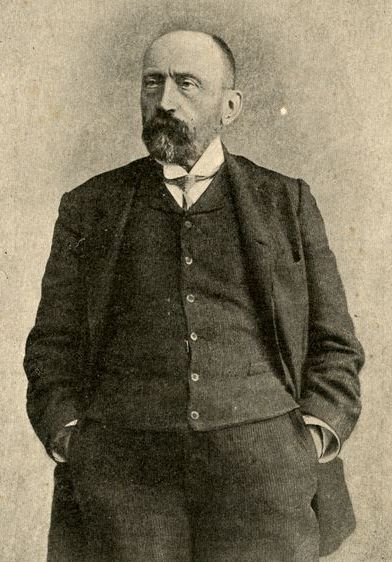
Postcard with the portrait of Davainis-Silvestraitis (c. 1905 – c. 1907)

Davainis-Silvestraitis was born on 20 April [O.S. 8 April] 1849 into a family of petty Lithuanian nobles near Kalnujai. His father Józefat Dowojna-Sylwestrowicz used the Szeliga coat of arms while his mother Eufroyzna de domo Jaruda, used the Pomian coat of arms. His parents owned four voloks of land and a manor. The family mostly spoke Polish though they also knew Lithuanian. His close relative, the son of his father's brother, was the publicist Aleksander Dowojna-Sylwestrowicz.

The family was not wealthy and Davainis-Silvestraitis completed only two years at the Kaunas Gymnasium and one year at the Kėdainiai Gymnasium. His further education was interrupted by the Uprising of 1863. His uncle was killed during the Uprising of 1831 and his mother was afraid that Davainis-Silvestraitis might join the rebels. After the uprising, the Kėdainiai Gymnasium was closed by the Tsarist authorities.

He inherited the manor after his father's death in 1869, but showed no great interest in agricultural matters. In 1874–1876, he took metalworking courses in Warsaw which he considered below his station and a desperate measure to improve his financial situation. He spent considerable effort collecting samples of Lithuanian folklore (especially folk tales) and attempting to publish them. While studying in Warsaw, he contributed articles and poetry in Polish to Wędrowiec and Tygodnik Illustrowany. In 1882, he published a note in the Polish magazine Wędrowiec that he was collecting folklore and searching for collaborators. He received responses from Antanas Baranauskas and Kazimieras Jaunius who introduced him to Jonas Basanavičius. In 1884, Davainis-Silvestraitis sent to Basanavičius a collection of 159 descriptions of illnesses and their folk remedies which were published in 1898. He also helped smuggle and distribute Lithuanian books that were illegal due to the Lithuanian press ban. When Aušra was published in 1883, Davainis-Silvestraitis contributed 82 texts to the publication and helped its distribution in Lithuania. His contributions ranged from polemic about nobility's role in the Lithuanian National Revival to short notes on prices of grain at different markets to romantic poetry. He also collected information about Simonas Daukantas, author of the first history of Lithuania in Lithuanian, and published data for his biography in 1898 in the United States. The manor was turned into an arenda (leased property) in 1885 but the manor still had 2,010 rubles of debts in 1890. The following year, Davainis-Silvestraitis transferred his share of the manor to his brother and moved to Jelgava in search for means of living. He initially chose Jelgava as it was home of the linguist Jonas Jablonskis which was visited by other Lithuanian activists, including Pranas Mašiotas, Juozas Tumas-Vaižgantas, Gabrielius Landsbergis-Žemkalnis.

=== Financial struggles ===
Living away from Lithuania, he could no longer collect samples of folklore. However, he continued to write for many Lithuanian periodicals, including Vienybė lietuvninkų (he was a paid correspondent in 1891–1896), Šviesa, Varpas, Ūkininkas, Žemaičių ir Lietuvos apžvalga, Tėvynės sargas, Nemuno sargas. Chasing profit, he led a nomadic life frequently moving to different cities in Russia. He briefly lived, among other places, in Alatyr and Sasovo. He attempted to become a broker for manor sales, later worked at an auction company and the office of the railroad engineer Petras Vileišis. He was also interested in various schemes, including purchasing land in Siberia and gold rush. In 1897, he moved to Saint Petersburg where together with Lithuanian businessman Antanas Smilga (future publisher of Lietuvių laikraštis) planned a Lithuanian periodical on agricultural and trade matters, but their permit applications were rejected due to the Lithuanian press ban.

In 1885, he married Julė Malinauskaitė, sister of Liudmila Malinauskaitė-Šliūpienė and sister-in-law of Jonas Šliūpas. Initially, Malinauskaitė joined her husband's Lithuanian activities, but perhaps due to continuing financial difficulties she became bitter and scornful that Davainis-Silvestraitis spent his time and energy on Lithuanian matters and not on earning a decent living. Their three children were raised in a similar spirit. Therefore, Davainis-Silvestraitis was not appreciated by his family. While Davainis-Silvestraitis relocated from one place to another, his family stayed in Jelgava. After relocating to Vilnius, Davainis-Silvestraitis hoped to reconcile with his wife and that the family could again live together but his efforts were rebuffed.

=== Cultural life in Vilnius ===
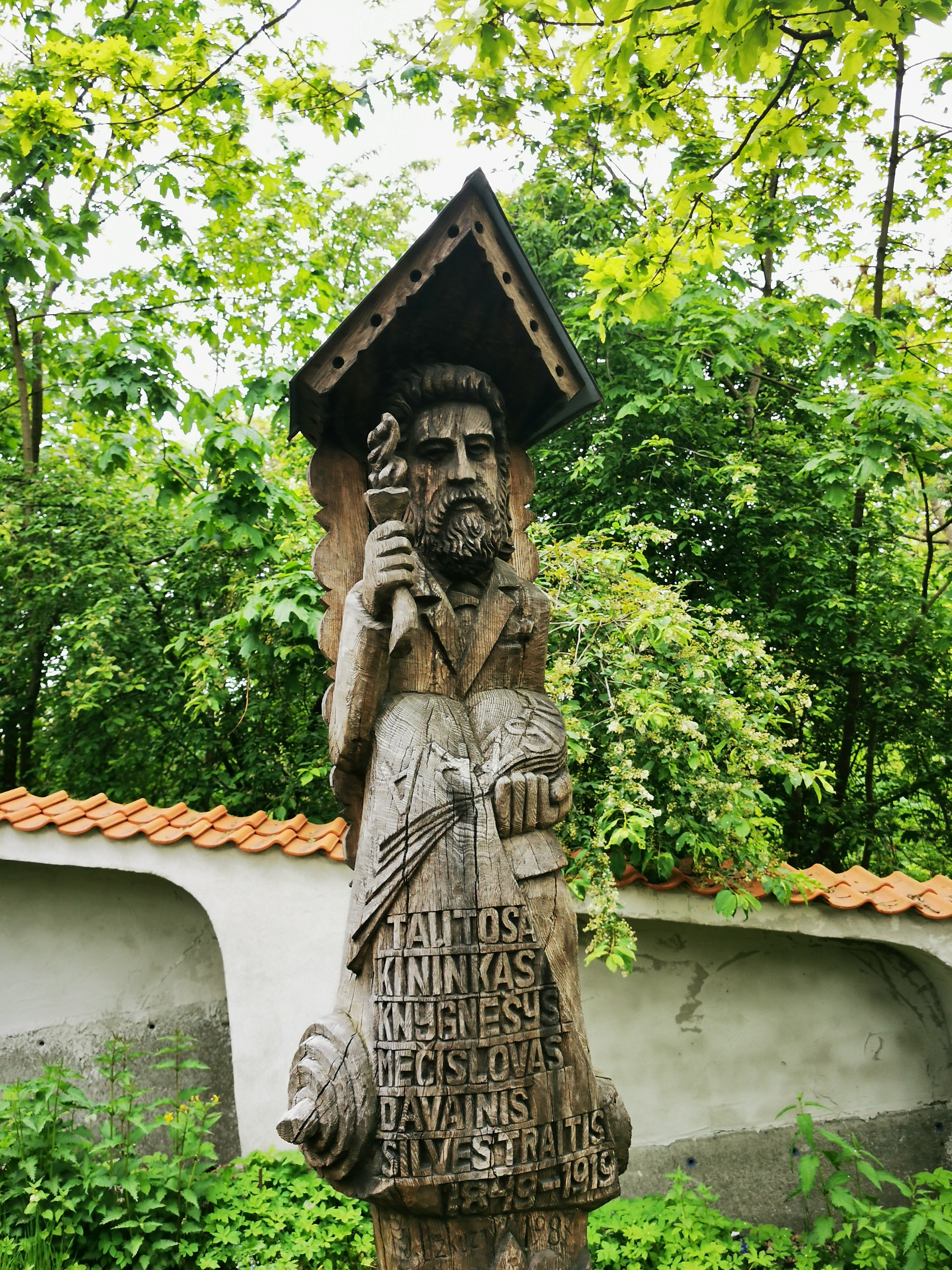
Tomb of Davainis-Silvestraitis in Rasos Cemetery

When the Lithuanian press ban was lifted in 1904, Davainis-Silvestraitis moved to Vilnius in August 1904 and worked at the bookstore established by Petras Vileišis. He was considered for editors of Vilniaus žinios but was rejected due to his lack of education. Not finding a steady income in Vilnius, he moved to Saint Petersburg in December 1904 to work at the editorial office of Lietuvių laikraštis. There he was a witness to the Bloody Sunday that sparked the Russian Revolution of 1905. Davainis-Silvestraitis was dissatisfied with working conditions at Lietuvių laikraštis and returned to Vilnius in March 1905. He joined various Lithuanian societies active in the city and contributed articles to Viltis and Šaltinis. He was one of the organizers of the Great Seimas of Vilnius in December 1905. He was one of the four people to sign the controversial memorandum to Sergei Witte, Prime Minister of the Russian Empire. However, he refused to join the National Democrats Party (Tautiškoji demokratų partija) organized right after the Seimas by Jonas Basanavičius because of its anti-nobility platform and demands that land should be distributed to peasants. His position was misunderstood by other Lithuanian activists and he began distancing himself from the Lithuanian public life.

With the help of Jonas Basanavičius, Davainis-Silvestraitis established and edited the Polish-language newspaper Litwa in July 1908 and ethnographic magazine Lud in 1912. These periodicals targeted Polish-Lithuanians (specifically, members of the Lithuanian nobility who spoke Polish but considered themselves to be Lithuanian) in hopes that they could be "returned" to their Lithuanian roots and would join the Lithuanian National Revival. However, the publications were not popular and Litwa was discontinued due to financial difficulties in May 1914. Davainis-Silvestraitis was increasingly rejected by the younger generation of Lithuanian activists. Davainis-Silvestraitis also served a three-month prison sentence for publishing an article urging to protect Lithuania from nihilistic influence from the East (i.e. Russia).

During World War I, Davainis-Silvestraitis evacuated to Tambov. There he worked for the Lithuanian Society for the Relief of War Sufferers. He returned to Vilnius in August 1918. He received some financial assistance from the Council of Lithuania and briefly worked at the Central Library (predecessor of the Martynas Mažvydas National Library of Lithuania) in the short-lived Lithuanian SSR. Poland captured the city in April 1919 and Davainis-Silvestraitis died on 31 May 1919 at the hospital of the Lithuanian Sanitary Aid Society. He was buried in the Rasos Cemetery. His grave was neglected during the Soviet period. In 1987, a new traditional wood carving of Davainis-Silvestraitis holding a torch and an open issue of Aušra was unveiled at his gravesite. The sculpture was added to the Cultural Heritage Registry in 2000.

== Studies of Lithuanian folklore ==
Davainis-Silvestraitis was proud of his noble birth and was interested in his family's genealogy even claiming that they reached the legendary Palemonid dynasty. His interest in the history of Lithuania brought him to studies of the Lithuanian language, pagan mythology, traditions, and folklore. Unlike many other nobles of the period, Davainis-Silvestraitis was proud of his Lithuanian heritage and rejected Polish culture which was seen as more prestigious at the time. His first notes are known from 1867 when he was eighteen. He read Polish works of Józef Ignacy Kraszewski, Adam Mickiewicz, Władysław Syrokomla, Teodor Narbutt. Likely, he was inspired by Lithuanian activities of Dionizas Poška and later by Antanas Juška. His interests were eclectic and he collected archaeological artifacts, old musical instruments, old tales from locals, etc. He started organizing and attempting to publish the collected materials only in early 1880s. Davainis-Silvestraitis was interested not only in Lithuanian traditions. For example, published two articles the customs of the Romani people in Lithuania in 1889–1890. He also wrote an overview of other nations' histories and traditions in 1881 which he published in his newspaper Litwa only in 1912.

=== Collection of folklore ===
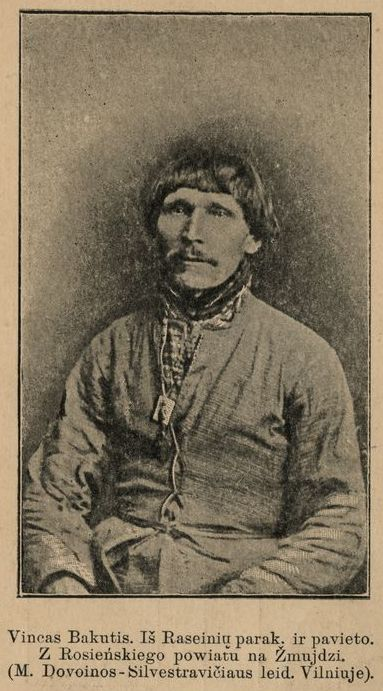
Postcard with the portrait of Vincas Bakutis published by Davainis-Silvestraitis

Davainis-Silvestraitis was most active in collecting examples of folklore from 1883 to 1890 in the area around Raseiniai. In 1904, he estimated that he had collected more than 700 folk tales in addition to other genres of folklore (folk songs, proverbs, etc.). That seems accurate since a surviving list of folk tales has 688 entries, but the last entry was recorded in 1892. Of these, 26 tales have not survived. Others are known from original notes (132 in Lithuanian and 12 in Polish) or from translations (516 into Polish and 2 into Russian). The original notes were lost when Davainis-Silvestraitis gave them to another person for safekeeping so that they would not be confiscated and destroyed by the Tsarist police in 1895. At the time, Lithuanian texts in the Latin alphabet were illegal due to the Lithuanian press ban. When he returned to Lithuania in 1905, Davainis-Silvestraitis resumed collecting folklore samples. A few of these texts were published in his own journals, but most remain in manuscripts. The collection from this period is not large as he spent most of his time and energy working in the publishing industry. At least 29 tales were recorded around Vilnius.

Davainis-Silvestraitis collected folklore based on the methodology that he learned from Jan Aleksander Karłowicz: he recorded who, when, and where told him the text, attempted to record the texts as accurately as possible, and provided some comments in footnotes. Most of the folk tales were recorded in 1887 (270 tales) and 1889 (169 tales). He recorded the tales from 247 people in 82 different villages and towns around Raseiniai. Additional 30 people told their tales in other locations in Lithuania. In addition to folk tales, Davainis-Silvestraitis collected about 250 folk songs, 500 short folklore sayings, 600 spells, 1,000 descriptions of folk medicine and medicinal herbs. Vincentas Bakutis (1829–1899) was the biggest local collaborator and supporter of Davainis-Silvestraitis. Bakutis was a local man who lived in poverty but was highly respected for his wisdom and knowledge. Likely, he was the main source of various traditions, games, spells, medicinal herbs, etc. collected by Davainis-Silvestraitis. Bakutis continued to collect and write down folklore even after Davainis-Silvestraitis left Lithuania.

=== Debunking Veckenstedt ===
Davainis-Silvestraitis became interested in Lithuanian folk tales when he established contacts with the Polish folklorist Jan Aleksander Karłowicz and after the publication of a collection of Samogitian tales in German by Edmund Veckenstedt in 1883. Karłowicz asked Davainis-Silvestraitis to attempt to corroborate and authenticate some of the more unusual tales published by Veckenstedt (they were later proved to be falsifications; see also pseudo-mythology). Davainis-Silvestraitis recorded several tales that had similar-sounding words or names to names in Veckenstedt's tales and attempted to match them up. This resulted in text alterations (e.g. adding names or functions to mythical beings) thus degrading the quality and authenticity of the tales. For example, Veckenstedt wrote about a man named Parkenas who was gifted a lyre by Laima and Davainis-Silvestraitis recorded a tale about a god of illnesses Parkeras, while the actual tale was about an itching illness known as parkera. While Davainis-Silvestraitis altered some details (e.g. adding names of mythical beings or replacing barbarisms with Lithuanian words), he did not alter the plot or meaning of the tales.

Davainis-Silvestraitis established contacts with Veckenstedt who promised to help print the 500 tales that Davainis-Silvestraitis had collected in the German journal Zeitschrift für Volkskunde and as a separate book. However, Veckenstedt printed only four descriptions of Lithuanian customs during užgavėnės and Ash Wednesday before their correspondence ceased in 1890. That year, articles harshly criticizing Veckenstedt for falsifying Lithuanian folklore were published by Karłowicz in Mélusine and Davainis-Silvestraitis in Wisła. Data collected by Davainis-Silvestraitis helped Karłowicz to prove that Veckenstedt falsified his publication.

=== Publishing collected material ===
At the end of 1886, with the help of Eduards Volters, Davainis-Silvestraitis was admitted as a corresponding member to the Russian Geographical Society after he presented 25 Lithuanian folk songs, 14 Polish songs, and 9 Lithuanian tales to the society. This renewed his interest in Lithuanian folk tales and hopes that his material would be published. In 1887, he recorded a total of 270 new tales from the people. However, the collaboration with Volters also did not work out perhaps because Davainis-Silvestraitis hoped to get substantial compensation for his collection or because Volters at the time supported the Lithuanian press ban. Only 24 songs from Palanga were published in Zhivaya Starina, journal of the Geographical Society, in 1893. However, linguist Jonas Jablonskis critically evaluated the publication for mistakes in phonetics and morphology and urged more care in future studies. Davainis-Silvestraitis sent samples of the folk tales that he collected to Jonas Basanavičius of which ten tales and five songs were published as a booklet in 1889 in Tilsit. He also attempted to publish via the Society of Devotees of Natural Science, Anthropology, and Ethnography. The society's president Dmitry Anuchin helped Davainis-Silvestraitis sell his collection of about 200 medicinal plants with descriptions how they are used in folk medicine to the botanical garden of Moscow University but only a few texts were published in the society's journal.

The most successful and productive collaboration was with Jan Aleksander Karłowicz who invited Davainis-Silvestraitis to contribute articles to Wisła that he edited. He published three types of articles: attempts at comparative analysis, reviews, and samples of collected folklore. Almost every issue of the journal printed some text from Davainis-Silvestraitis; in total, he published almost 20 articles, including articles on traditional village architecture, traditions of Joninės, legends about Linkmenys Hillfort and Vištytis Lake, 34 Polish songs. Karłowicz also helped Davainis-Silvestraitis to publish an article in the journal of the Gypsy Lore Society about the customs of the Romani people in Lithuania in 1889. However, Davainis-Silvestraitis lacked formal education and his articles lacked consistency and internal logic; therefore, he mostly concentrated on publishing samples of folklore. Karłowicz also worked on publishing the tales collected by Davainis-Silvestraitis. The tales were translated to Polish by Davainis-Silvestraitis but their language needed heavy editing as Davainis-Silvestraitis spoke and wrote in provincial Polish mixed with some Lithuanian jargon. Though translated, the text provided Lithuanian original words for various specific names (e.g. names of mythical beings, certain things or rituals) and harder to translate fragments (e.g. idioms, phrasemes, salutations, curses). Such editorial work delayed the publication from 1888 to 1894. Two 400-page volumes were published and another was prepared, but not published due to financial difficulties. The tales were not grouped or classified in any way and are presented almost randomly. The two published volumes contain about 300 texts and remain the largest publication of Lithuanian folk tales in Polish. The collection was again negatively reviewed by Jonas Jablonskis who wrote that it was shameful that the collection was published in Polish and not in original Lithuanian.

After the death of Davainis-Silvestraitis, his collections attracted little interest. Only in 1973, 152 tales in Lithuanian were published in Vilnius.

== Other activities ==
=== Lithuanian clubs and societies ===
Davainis-Silvestraitis was a member of several Lithuanian societies. He joined the cultural Birutė Society which was organized in 1885 in East Prussia and donated books to its library. He became more active in Lithuanian cultural life when he moved to Vilnius in 1904. He was one of founding members of the Lithuanian Mutual Aid Society of Vilnius in March 1904 and was elected to a committee tasked with organizing Lithuanian language lessons at different schools in the city. He supported efforts to introduce Lithuanian language services at Roman Catholic churches in Vilnius and surrounding area. He was one of the founding members of the Union for the Return of the Lithuanian Language Rights in Lithuanian Churches (Sąjunga lietuvių kalbos teisėms grąžinti Lietuvos bažnyčiose) in July 1906 and signed a complaint to Pope Pius X. He became one of the founding members of the Lithuanian Scientific Society established by Jonas Basanavičius in December 1906 and of the Lithuanian Art Society in September 1907. He also participated in the Kanklės of Vilnius Society.

In 1906, Davainis-Silvestraitis began writing articles for Kurier Litewski in an attempt to find cooperation with different Polish activist groups. He objected to the Polish ambitions of establishing a multi-cultural society along the lines of the old Polish–Lithuanian Commonwealth and urged Poles to support the national state of Lithuanians. In 1907, he published the Polish satirical booklet Satyry litewskie in which he criticized the Polish National Democracy (Endecja) and called it the greatest enemy of Lithuania that wanted to see only the Polish language and Polish nation in Lithuania. This forced him to resign from Kurier Litewski.

In 1906–1907, he wrote articles to Vilniaus žinios in which he described towns and villages around Vilnius (e.g. Žasliai, Kernavė, Sudervė, Nemenčinė, Videniškiai, Eišiškės, Šalčininkai, Dieveniškės, etc.) showcasing their Lithuanian heritage and thus providing arguments for the Lithuanian claims to Vilnius Region. At the same time, he published a series of 29 postcards that depicted notable people (Simonas Daukantas, Dionizas Poška, Adam Mickiewicz, Teodor Narbutt as well as himself) and objects from the history and mythology of Lithuania (mainly taken from Narbutt's works).

=== Publisher of Litwa ===
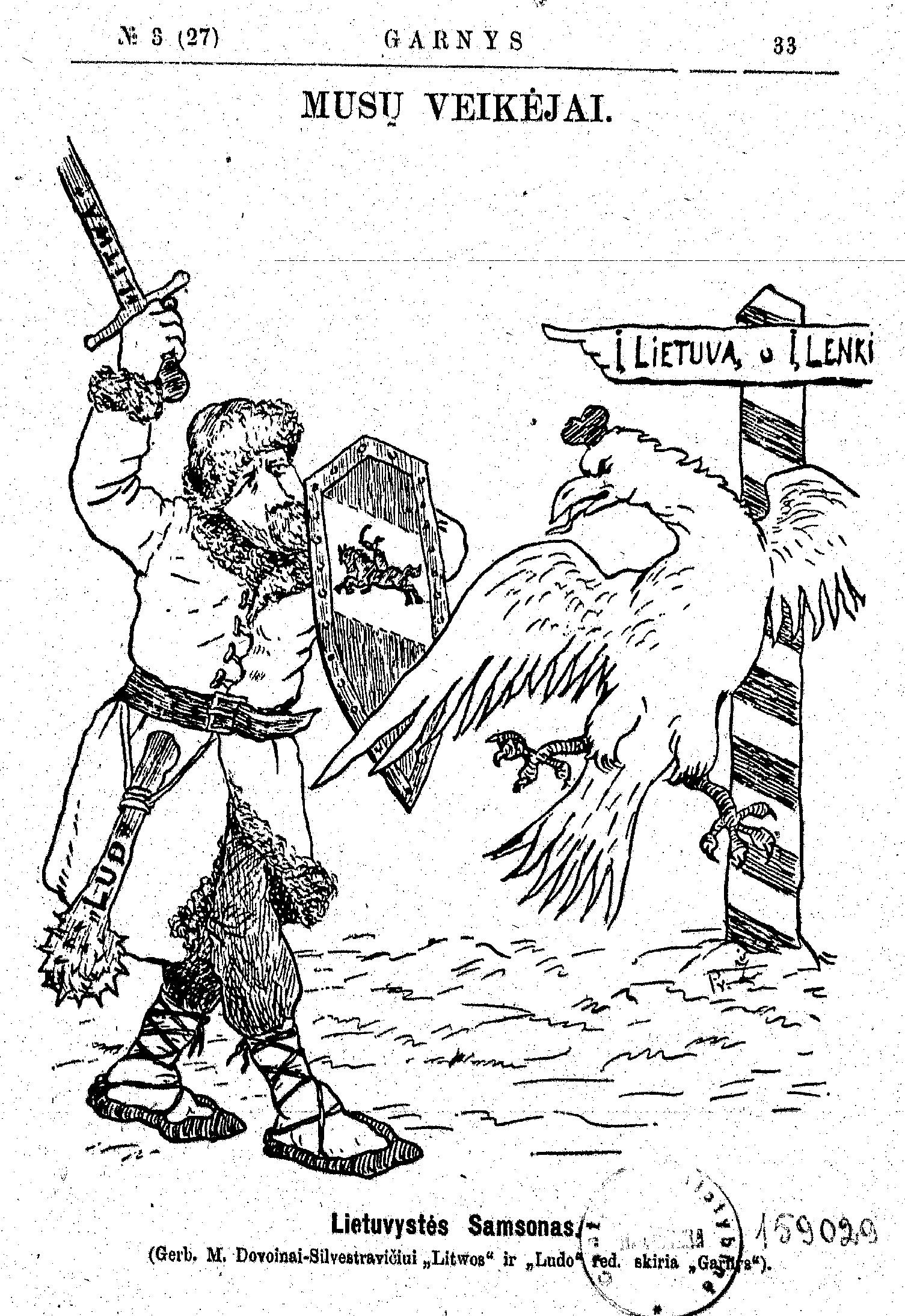
Caricature of Davainis-Silvestraitis with the caption "Lithuanian Samson" published in 1912. It depicts Davainis-Silvestraitis wearing bast shoes and armed with the sword Litwa, club Lud and shield with Vytis fighting the Polish eagle.

With the help of Jonas Basanavičius, Davainis-Silvestraitis began publishing Litwa in July 1908. The newspaper was mainly directed to the Polish-speaking Lithuanian nobles who maintained the dual Polish-Lithuanian identity and sought to involve them in the Lithuanian National Revival. The newspaper supported the concept of the ethnographic Lithuania and fiercely criticized ideas about recreating the old Polish–Lithuanian Commonwealth by the Polish National Democracy. A separate Polish newspaper Lud grew out of Litwa's efforts to address Polonization of Vilnius and Vilna Governorate and mainly published articles about the use of Polish language in Catholic churches and attempts to introduce Lithuanian-language masses and services. However, the newspapers did not provide new ideas and failed to become a catalyst for polemic discussions.

Litwa failed to attract interest of Polish groups, the Krajowcy, or activists of the Belarusian National Revival. Davainis-Silvestraitis was also criticized by Lithuanian activists. In 1913, he wrote that the use of the Lithuanian language should not be a deciding factor on who should be considered a Lithuanian. He argued that nationality should be decided based on one's devotion and loyalty to the state (see also Krajowcy). Such position was criticized by Gabrielius Landsbergis-Žemkalnis and Kazimieras Prapuolenis. When it became clear that Litwa would be discontinued, Gabrielė Petkevičaitė-Bitė, Mykolas Sleževičius, and Kazys Grinius published articles in Lietuvos žinios criticizing Davainis-Silvestraitis' approach to the "re-Lithuanization" of the nobles. Such comments were hurtful and Davainis-Silvestraitis felt misunderstood and not appreciated, rejected by the younger generation of Lithuanian activists and by his own family. Nevertheless, in 1913–1914, he decided to write an encyclopedia on Lithuanian topics in Polish. He hoped to print it in parts in Litwa which would transform into a purely scientific publication. He completed the manuscript of the encyclopedia, but could not publish it due to World War I.

Davainis-Silvestraitis kept a diary from his relocation to Vilnius on 18 August 1904 until 7 February 1912. It was written with the intent of chronicling Lithuanian activities in the city and was published in 2020.

=== Poetry ===
Davainis-Silvestraitis wrote and published several poems in Lithuanian and Polish. Like many other poets of the time, he wrote romantic poetry in which he proclaimed love to the homeland, expressed abstract hopes for its bright future, idealized its heroic past, and urged to learn and use Lithuanian language. He also published a few satirical poems in the Polish press. He did not have greater poetic talents but two of his works were published as separate booklets. In 1884, he published Tėvynės giesmė (Hymn of the Homeland) as a separate booklet. It described a young Lithuanian woman who was superior to young women from other nations. Another booklet with his poem Palemonas ir Giržduta was published in 1904. The poem mixes the legends about Palemon with historical facts and folklore tropes but lacks coherence and poetic merit. It was intended as a heroic poem but its stronger areas are descriptions of nature. He also translated few poems by Adam Mickiewicz and a section of Childe Harold's Pilgrimage by Lord Byron into Lithuanian. In October 1904, he wrote a poem in honor of Zygmunt Sierakowski, one of the leaders of the Uprising of 1863; it was first published in 2013.

== Bibliography ==
- Dambriūnas, Leonardas (November 1960). "Adomas Jakštas — publicistas". Aidai (in Lithuanian). 9 (134).
- Grigaravičius, Algirdas (2017). Atsiskyrėlis iš Suvalkijos. Jono Basanavičiaus gyvenimas ir darbai (in Lithuanian). Vol. I. Versus aureus. ISBN 978-9955-34-641-8.
- Juodytė, Genė (27 December 2014). "Mečislovas Davainis-Silvestraitis: poetas, publicistas, tautosakininkas" (in Lithuanian). Šiaulių kraštas.
- Kerbelytė, Brosnislava (1973). "Mečislovas Davainis-Silvestraitis tautosakininkas". In Kerbelytė, Brosnislava; Viščinis, Klimas (eds.). Pasakos, sakmės, oracijos. Surinko Mečislovas Davainis-Silvestraitis (PDF) (in Lithuanian). Vaga. OCLC 1102423.
- Kerbelytė, Brosnislava (3 March 2020) [2003]. "Mečislovas Davainis-Silvestraitis". Visuotinė lietuvių enciklopedija (in Lithuanian). Mokslo ir enciklopedijų leidybos centras.
- Krikštaponis, Vilmantas (8 May 2015). "Tapęs tautinio išsivadavimo švyturiu". XXI amžius (in Lithuanian). 18 (2138). ISSN 2029-1299.
- Mastianica, Olga (July 2013). "Keli nežinomi Mečislovo Davainio-Silvestraičio kūrybos puslapiai". Metai (in Lithuanian). 7. ISSN 0134-3211.
- Mastianica, Olga (2016). Bajorija lietuvių tautiniame projekte (XIX a. pabaiga – XX a. pradžia) (in Lithuanian). Vilnius: Lietuvos istorijos institutas. ISBN 978-609-8183-13-9.
- Mastianica-Stankevič, Olga (2017). "Mečislovo Davainio-Silvestraičio dienoraštis: lietuvių inteligento saviraiškos Vilniuje liudininkas (1904–1912)". Archivum Lithuanicum (in Lithuanian). 19. ISSN 1392-737X.
- Mastianica-Stankevič, Olga (2018). "Beata Kalęba, Rozdroże. Literatura polska w kręgu litewskiego odrodzenia narodowego, Kraków: Universitatis, 2016". Lithuanian Historical Studies. 22. ISSN 1392-2343.
- Mastianica-Stankevič, Olga (2020). "Mečislovas Davainis-Silvestraitis ir jo Dienoraštis" (PDF). In Mastianica-Stankevič, Olga; Venckienė, Jurgita (eds.). Dienoraštis 1904–1912 (in Lithuanian). Lietuvos istorijos institutas. ISBN 978-609-8183-76-4.
- Mažonas, K. (5 December 1969). "Mečislovas Dovoina-Silvestravičius" (PDF). Dirva (in Lithuanian). 96.
- Rutkovska, Kristina (2013). "Lietuvių tautosakos rinkėjų Jano Karlovičiaus ir Mečislovo Davainio-Silvestraičio bendradarbiavimas: metodologijos raida, etnolingvistikos apraiškos" (PDF). Archivum Lithuanicum (in Lithuanian). 15. ISSN 1392-737X.
- Sniečkutė, Marija (2017). "Olga Mastianica, Bajorija lietuvių tautiniame projekte (XIX a. pabaiga – XX a. pradžia), Vilnius: Lietuvos istorijos institutas, 2016. 200 p. ISBN 978-609-8183-13-9". Lithuanian Historical Studies. 21. ISSN 1392-2343.
- Vaskelaitė, Vilma (2020). "Lietuvystės Samsonas pakirptais plaukais" (PDF). Naujasis Židinys - Aidai (in Lithuanian). 7. ISSN 1392-6845.
- Venckienė, Jurgita (2020). "Mečislovo Davainio-Silvestraičio lietuvių kalba". In Mastianica-Stankevič, Olga; Venckienė, Jurgita (eds.). Dienoraštis 1904–1912 (in Lithuanian). Lietuvos istorijos institutas. ISBN 978-609-8183-76-4.
