= Krinčinas =

- Town
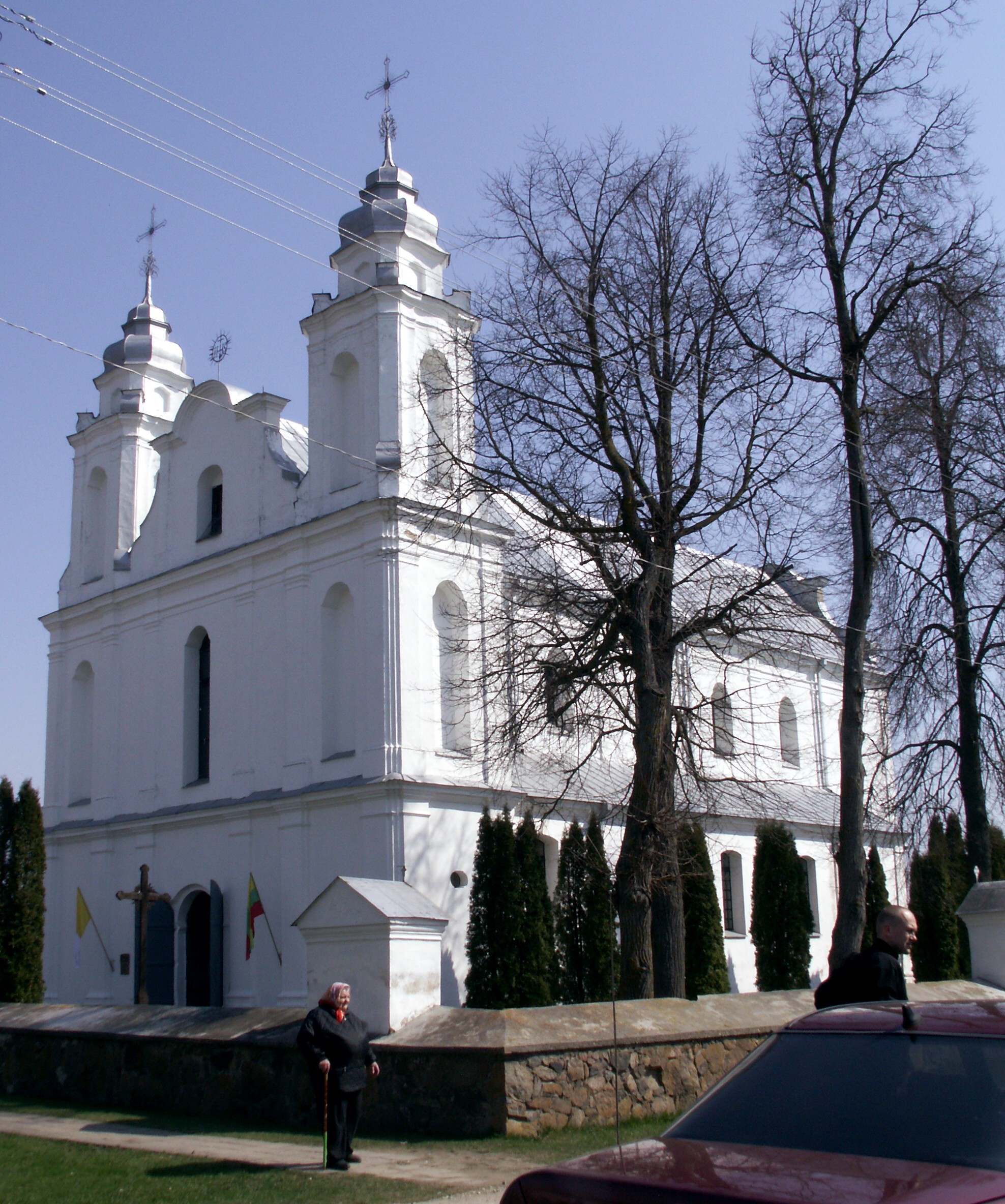

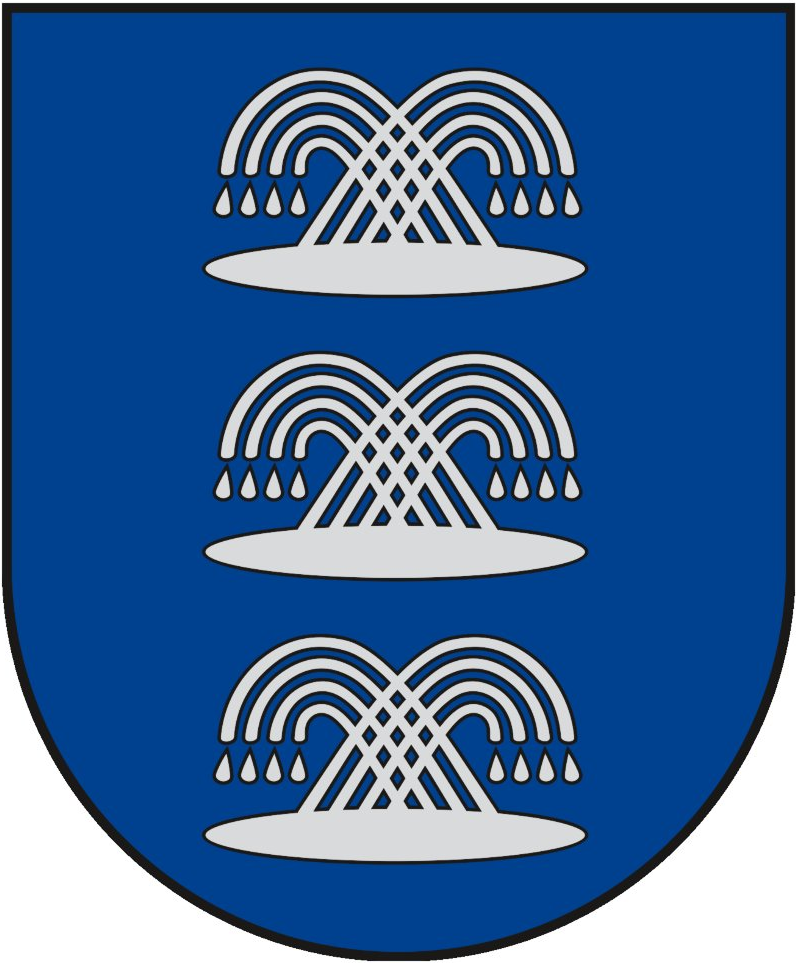
- Seal

- Location within Lithuania
- Coordinates: 56°5′0″N 24°31′30″E
- Country: Lithuania
- County: Panevėžys County

Population (2011)
  - Total: 461
- Time zone: UTC+2 (EET)
  - Summer (DST): UTC+3 (EEST)

Krinčinas is a small town in Panevėžys County, in northeastern Lithuania. According to the 2011 census, the town has a population of 461 people.

== History ==
On July 26, 1941, 21 Krincinas Jews were massacred in a mass execution perpetrated by Germans in the Zideiko Forest in Pasvalys.
