= Vainutas =

- Town
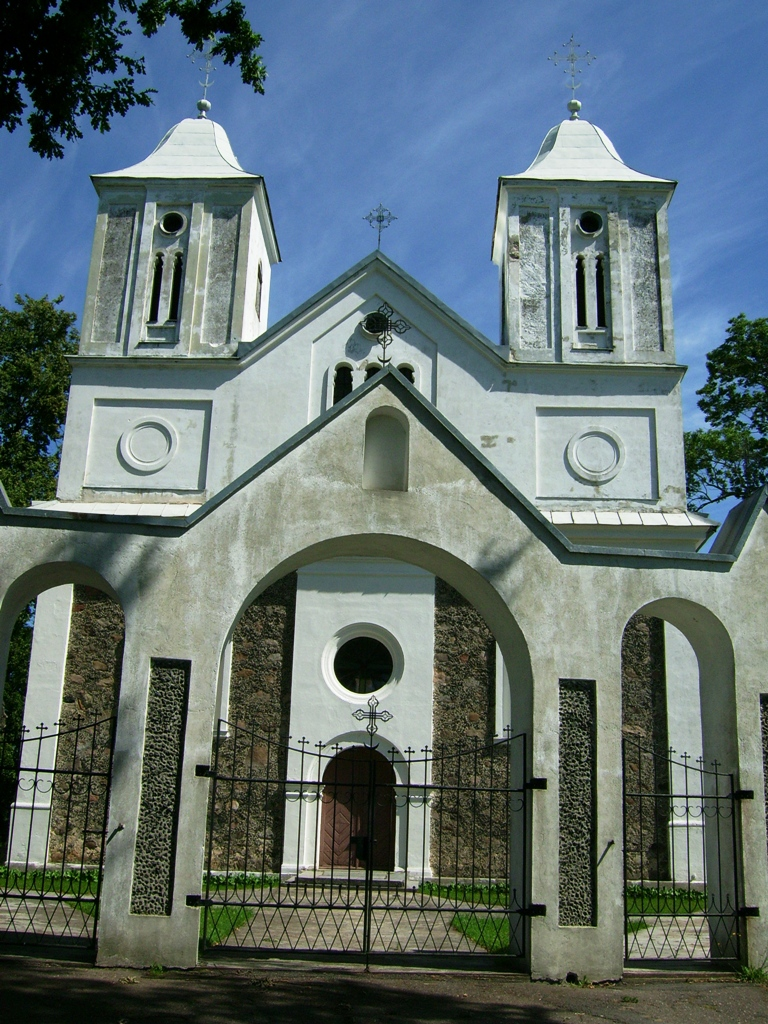

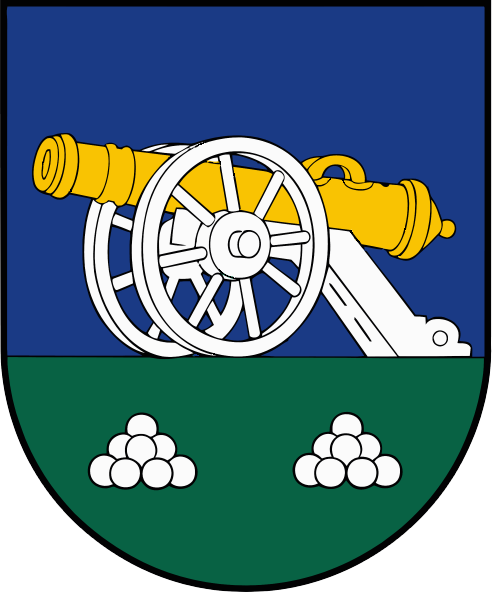
- Seal

- Location within Lithuania
- Coordinates: 55°21′50″N 21°52′0″E
- Country: Lithuania
- County: Klaipėda County

Population (2011)
  - Total: 746
- Time zone: UTC+2 (EET)
  - Summer (DST): UTC+3 (EEST)

Vainutas is a small town in Klaipėda County, in northwestern Lithuania. According to the 2011 census, the town has a population of 746 people.

== History ==
During the Second World War, the Jewish community was assassinated in a mass execution perpetrated by an einsatzgruppen. There is a monument on the site of the massacre.
