= Kalnujai =

- Village
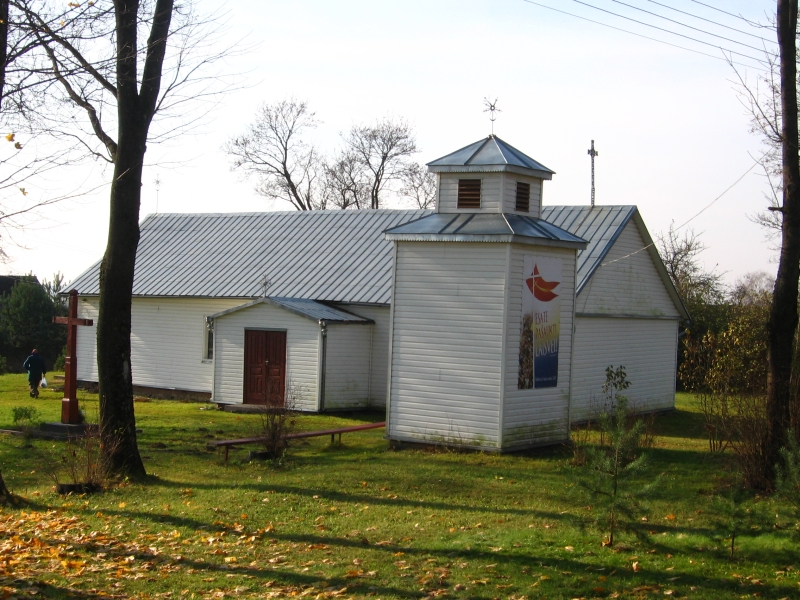
- Church of Saint Victor in Kalnujai

- Flag Coat of arms

- Location of Kalnujai
- Coordinates: 55°19′41″N 23°5′38″E
- Country: Lithuania
- County: Kaunas County
- Municipality: Raseiniai District Municipality

Population (2021)
  - Total: 392
- Time zone: UTC+2 (EET)
  - Summer (DST): UTC+3 (EEST)

Kalnujai is a village in Raseiniai District Municipality in Lithuania with a population of 402 inhabitants (2011).

== History ==
During the summer of 1941, an Einsatzgruppen of German and Lithuanian nationalists murdered the Jews of the nearby town of Raseiniai and the surroundings on a site in Kalnujai. Hundred of Jews died in the mass executions. A memorial is built on the site of the massacre.
