= Šiaulėnai =

- Town
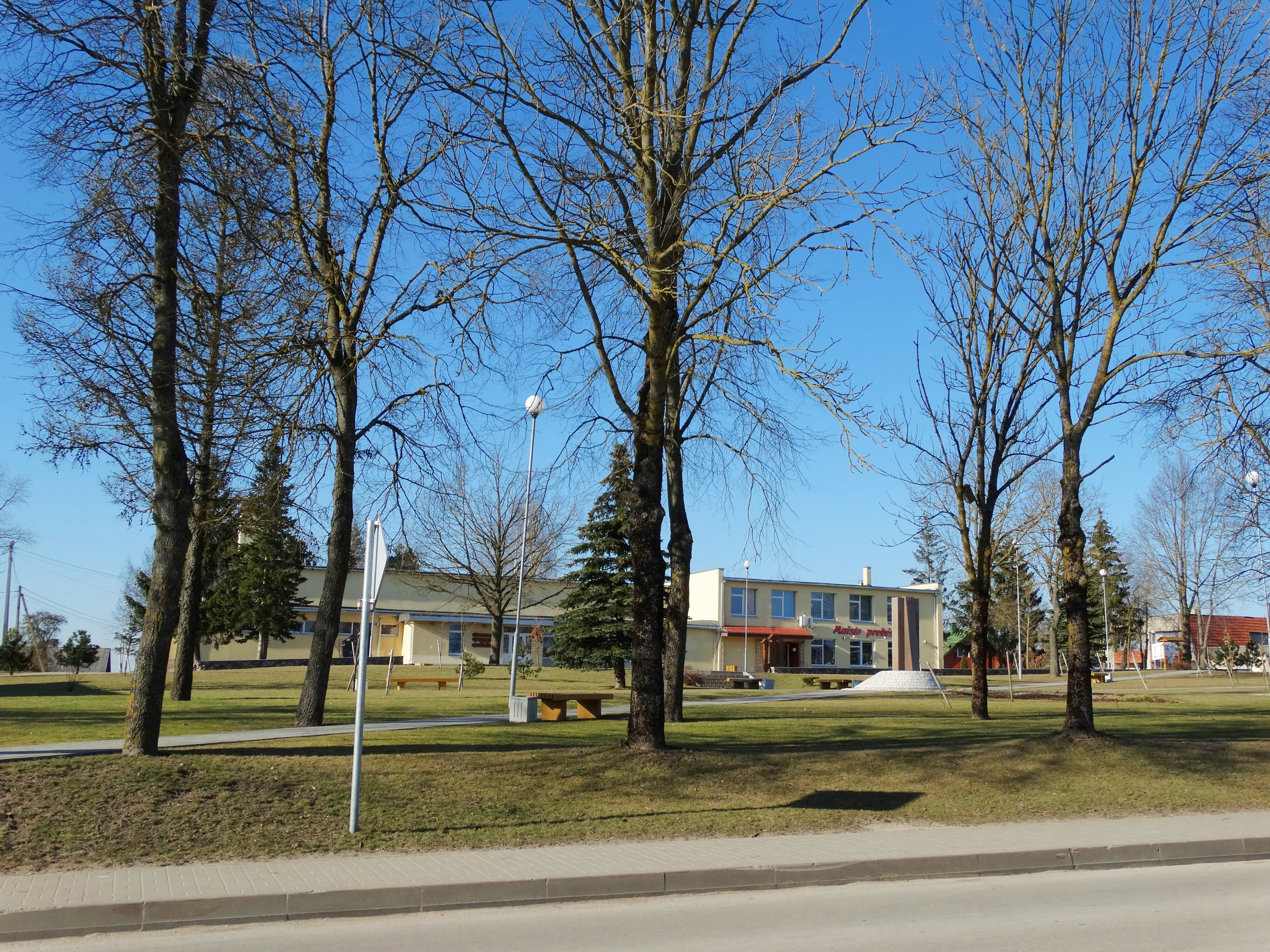

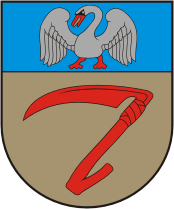
- Coat of arms

- Location in Lithuania
- Coordinates: 55°40′51.6″N 23°24′21.6″E
- Country: Lithuania
- Ethnographic region: Samogitia
- County: Šiauliai County

Population (2011)
  - Total: 751
- Time zone: UTC+2 (EET)
  - Summer (DST): UTC+3 (EEST)

Šiaulėnai is a town near Šiauliai in Lithuania located at 55°41′N 23°24′E. It is in the Radviliškis district municipality in Šiauliai County. It is the capital of Šiaulėnai elderate.

== History ==
During the 1784 census, Šiaulėnai was located in the Žemaitija (Samogitia) duchy/eldership.

The Jewish population of Šiaulėnai was devastated by the Nazis during World War II.

== Historical names ==
Under Czarist occupation of Lithuania, the city was known in Russian as Шавлан. It may be listed on historical documents in the United States as Shavlan, Shavlyan, Shavlyany, or Szawlany, Russia.

== Attractions ==
Notable attractions include:

- Šiaulėnai Area Museum, located at LT-5137 Radviliškis district
