= Šarūnas Raudys =

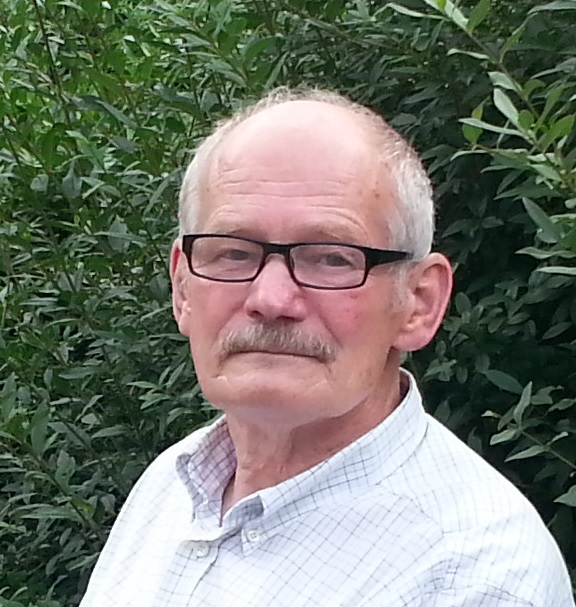
- Born: 24 February 1941 (age 85); Kaunas, Lithuania
- Education: Kaunas University of Technology
- Awards: Council of Ministers of the Lithuanian SSR Prize (1987); Lithuanian Science Prize (2003); AI Awards 2021 lifetime achievement honour (2021)
- Scientific career
- Fields: Computer science, mathematics, statistical pattern recognition, artificial neural networks
- Workplaces: Vilnius University
- Doctoral advisor: Adolfas Laimutis Telksnys

Šarūnas Raudys (born 24 February 1941) is a Lithuanian computer scientist and mathematician, and a professor emeritus at Vilnius University. His research focuses on multivariate statistics, statistical pattern recognition, artificial neural networks and the relationship between classifier complexity, training-sample size and accuracy.

From 1980 to 2009, Raudys headed the Data Analysis Department of the Institute of Mathematics and Informatics. From 2009 he led the Computational Intelligence Research Group at Vilnius University.

From 1963 to 1965, he worked as an engineer at the Vilnius Computing Machinery Factory. After defending his Candidate of Sciences dissertation in 1969, he was a senior researcher at the Institute of Mathematics and Informatics from 1969 to 1980. He received the title of professor in 1985.

== Academic service ==
Raudys supervised the doctoral dissertations of Aušra Saudargienė (2001), Vytenis Punys (2002), and Židrina Pabarškaitė (2009). He was a co-supervisor, together with Frans Groen, of Vytautas Vyšniauskas's 1996 dissertation.

He is a member of the local editorial board of the journal Informatica. He was also listed on the editorial board of Pattern Recognition.

== Education ==
- Doctor of Sciences in physics and mathematics, Institute of Electronics and Computer Science, Riga, 1979.
- Candidate of Sciences in computer science, Institute of Physics and Mathematics, 1969.
- Electrical engineering degree, Kaunas Polytechnic Institute (now Kaunas University of Technology), 1963.
- Panevėžys First Secondary School (now Juozas Balčikonis Gymnasium).

== Awards ==
- Council of Ministers of the Lithuanian SSR Prize (1987).
- Lithuanian Science Prize (2003), for the research series "Statistical and Neural Classifiers: Technologies for Integrated Use (1967–2002)".
- Honoured for lifetime achievement in artificial intelligence at AI Awards 2021, organized by the Lithuanian Artificial Intelligence Association.
- Recipient of a Lithuanian Luminaries 2022 award.

== Selected publications ==
- Raudys, Šarūnas (2008). Žinių išgavimas iš duomenų: vadovėlis [Knowledge Extraction from Data: Textbook] (in Lithuanian). Klaipėda: Klaipėda University Press. p. 169. ISBN 978-9955-18-345-7.
- Pranevičius, Henrikas; Raudys, Šarūnas; Rudžionis, Algimantas; Rudžionis, Vytautas; Ratkevičius, Kastytis; Sakalauskaitė, Jūratė; Makackas, Dalius (2008). Agentinių sistemų modeliai: mokomoji knyga [Models of Agent Systems: Textbook] (in Lithuanian). Vilnius: Mokslo aidai. ISBN 978-9955-591-55-9.
- Raudys, Šarūnas (2001). Statistical and Neural Classifiers: An Integrated Approach to Design. London: Springer. doi:10.1007/978-1-4471-0359-2. ISBN 978-1-85233-297-6.
- Raudys, Šarūnas; Jain, Anil K. (1991). "Small Sample Size Problems in Designing Artificial Neural Networks". In Sethi, Ishwar K.; Jain, Anil K. (eds.). Artificial Neural Networks and Statistical Pattern Recognition: Old and New Connections. Elsevier. pp. 33–50. doi:10.1016/B978-0-444-88740-5.50008-6.
- Raudys, Šarūnas; Jain, Anil K. (1991). "Small Sample Size Effects in Statistical Pattern Recognition: Recommendations for Practitioners". IEEE Transactions on Pattern Analysis and Machine Intelligence. 13 (3): 252–264. doi:10.1109/34.75512.
- Raudys, Šarūnas (1991). "On the Effectiveness of Parzen Window Classifier". Informatica. 2 (3): 434–454. doi:10.3233/INF-1991-2307.
- Dičiūnas, Valdas; Raudys, Šarūnas (2000). "Generalization Error of Randomized Linear Zero Empirical Error Classifier: Simple Asymptotics for Centered Data Case". Informatica. 11 (4): 381–396. doi:10.3233/INF-2000-11403.
- Raudys, Šarūnas (1984). Statistical Pattern Recognition: Small Design Sample Problems. Institute of Mathematics and Cybernetics, Vilnius.
- Raudys, Šarūnas (1978). “Optimization of Nonparametric Classification Algorithm”. In A. Medvedev (ed.), Adaptive Systems and Applications. Nauka, pp. 57–62.
- Raudys, Šarūnas (1976). Limitation of Sample Size in Classification Problems. Institute of Physics and Mathematics, Vilnius, 186 pp.

== Personal life ==
Šarūnas Raudys was born to Juozas Baltrušis and Antanina Varkalaitė-Baltrušienė, and had one brother, Algimantas Baltrušis. Due to persecution by Soviet authorities, his father was forced to change the family surname to Raudys, which Šarūnas later adopted. His mother was deported to Siberia, and much of his childhood was spent living with his father.
