= Bernardas Bučas =

Lithuanian painter, sculptor, and graphicer

Bernardas Bučas (1903–1979) was a Lithuanian painter, sculptor, and graphicer. Amongst his works are the statue Agriculture (Lithuanian: Žemės ūkis) on the Green Bridge in Vilnius.

== See also ==
- List of Lithuanian painters
