= Jan Karłowicz =

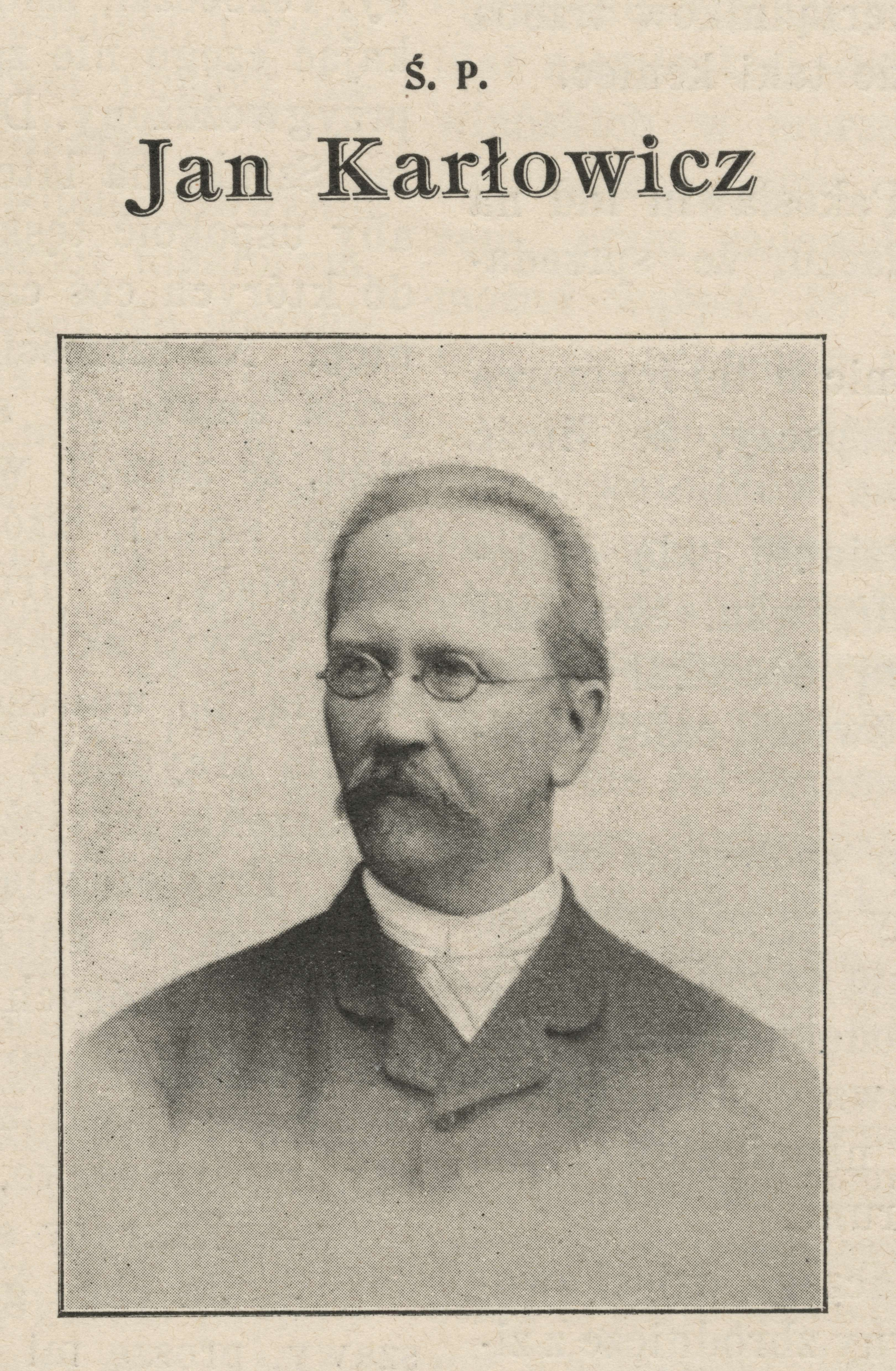
Jan Karłowicz

Jan Aleksander Ludwik August Karłowicz (May 28, 1836 – June 14, 1903) was Polish ethnographer, musicologist, composer, linguist, folklorist, lexicographer, dialectologist, one of the first Lithuanianists.

Karłowicz was a correspondent of Belarusian ethnographer and folklorist Stefania Ulanowska.

== Books ==
Most of his books are available online at the resource polona.pl.

- O Żydzie wiecznym tułaczu (1873)
- O języku litewskim (1875)
- Piękna Meluzyna i królewna Wanda (1876) (Beautiful Melusine and Princess Wanda)
- Słoworód ludowy (1878)
- Przyczynek do zbioru przysłów, piosenek, ucinków i przypowieści od nazw rodowych i miejscowych (1879)
- Przysłowia od nazwisk (1879)
- O imieniu Polaków i Polski (1881)
- Die Mythen, Sagen und Legenden der Zamaiten (1883, 2 volumes)
- Chata polska (1884)
- Systematyka pieśni ludu polskiego (1885)
- Podania i bajki ludowe zebrane na Litwie (1887)
- Imiona własne polskich miejsc i ludzi od zatrudnień (1887)
- Słownik wyrazów obcego a mniej jasnego pochodzenia (1894–1905, 3 volumes)
- Słownik gwar polskich (1900–1911, 6 volumes) (Dictionary of Polish Dialects)
- Lud. Rys ludoznawstwa polskiego (1903)
