= Banaitis =

- Lithuanian surname
- m.: Banaitis
- f.: (unmarried): Banaitytė
- f.: (married): Banaitienė

Banaitis is a Lithuanian surname.

- Kazimieras Viktoras Banaitis
- Banaitienė, surname by the second marriage of Kazimiera Kymantaitė
- Saliamonas Banaitis
