= Lithuanian Opera Company of Chicago =

Opera company in Illinois, United States

The Lithuanian Opera Company of Chicago was founded by Lithuanian emigrants in 1956, and presents operas in Lithuanian. It celebrated fifty years of existence in 2006, and operates as a not-for-profit organization. It is noteworthy for performing the rarely staged Rossini's William Tell (1986) and Ponchielli's I Lituani (1981, 1983 and 1991), and also for contributing experienced chorus singers to the Lyric Opera of Chicago. The opera Jūratė and Kastytis by Kazimieras Viktoras Banaitis was presented in Chicago, Illinois in 1996.

Lithuanian operas were sometimes held at Maria High School in Chicago and such operas are now sometimes held at Morton East High School in Cicero, Illinois.
