= Draugija =

Lithuanian-language magazine

Draugija (literally: society, association) was a Lithuanian-language magazine published in Kaunas in 1907–1914, 1919–1923, and 1937–1940. Published by the Society of Saint Casimir, it focused on the issues of Lithuanian culture, literature, science, and politics and was geared towards the intelligentsia and the Catholic clergy. It urged everyone to work on developing the Lithuanian culture which would distinguish the Lithuanian nation from others and believed in slow and steady cultural work. The magazine critically reviewed essentially every more substantial work of Lithuanian literature, published articles to improve and standardize the Lithuanian language, discussed how to improve education, analyzed social and political issues in Lithuania, promoted Christian democracy, criticized ultra-conservatives and attempted to find the proper place for the Catholic Church in modern society and science. Its issues usually had more than 100 pages and reached circulation of 1,000 copies. Its long-term editor was Lithuanian Catholic theologist and philosopher Adomas Jakštas (1907–1938). In total, 213 issues were published. Its supplement for Catholic youth Ateitis (Future) edited by Pranas Dovydaitis gave rise to the Lithuanian Catholic Federation Ateitis.

== History ==
The Lithuanian press ban in the Russian Empire was in effect from 1864 to 1904, thus the first Lithuanian cultural magazine Dirva was published by Antanas Milukas in the United States and the illegal Žinyčia established by Juozas Tumas-Vaižgantas lasted only five issues. When the press ban was lifted in 1904, Lithuanians hurried to establish various periodicals. In July 1906, during a meeting of the newly established Society of Saint Casimir for publishing Lithuanian books, it was decided to establish a new cultural magazine. It was understood that the magazine would be unprofitable due to the limited number of subscribers. The society's chairman Adomas Jakštas became the editor of Draugija. The first issue was published in January 1907. The monthly magazine with circulation of 1,000 copies was printed at the press of Saliamonas Banaitis.

In February 1911, Draugija began publishing supplement for Catholic youth Ateitis (Future) edited by Pranas Dovydaitis. It had its own supplement which published samples of Lithuanian folklore (songs, riddles, proverbs, etc.) collected by the students. It gave rise to the Lithuanian Catholic Federation Ateitis and became an independent publication in 1913. In 1914, Draugija also published a supplement for teachers Mokytojas (Teacher) edited by Antanas Busilas.

The magazine continued to be printed monthly until the outbreak of World War I. Jakštas and several others, as politically unreliable persons, were deported from Kaunas to Vilnius by the commandant of the Kaunas Fortress. Therefore, the last four issues of 1914 of Draugija were published in one booklet in early 1915. The subsequent German occupation interrupted any further attempts to publish the magazine. German authorities allowed to reestablish the publication only in October 1918. The first issue appeared in January 1919. It was a monthly publication, but it would combine two issues into one booklet published every two months. From the beginning of 1923, it became the official publication of the newly established Faculty of Theology and Philosophy of the University of Lithuania. However, the faculty dropped the magazine after it published a political article on the Lithuanian Christian Democratic Party. Draugija was discontinued in October 1923 after 153 issues. It was partially replaced by Židinys published by the Ateitis Federation in 1925–1940.

Draugija was revived as a periodical published every two weeks in December 1937. Jakštas resumed editorship and after his death was replaced by Nikodemas Raštutis. The magazine was discontinued after the Soviet occupation in June 1940. This revived magazine targeted the clergy of the Roman Catholic Archdiocese of Kaunas and published documents of the bishop and diocesan curia, thus becoming an organ (official periodical) of the archdiocese.

== Content ==
More than 150 authors contributed articles to Draugija before World War I. Its authors included Jonas Basanavičius, Pranas Būčys, Kazimieras Būga, Pranas Dovydaitis, Liudas Gira, Motiejus Gustaitis, Lazdynų Pelėda, Petras Leonas, Maironis, Pranas Mašiotas, Jurgis Matulaitis-Matulevičius, Vincas Mykolaitis-Putinas, Juozas Purickis, Justinas Staugaitis, Stasys Šalkauskis, Šatrijos Ragana, Juozas Tumas-Vaižgantas, Augustinas Voldemaras, Vydūnas.

=== Social issues ===
The magazine devoted significant attention to issues in education. Russian public schools could accommodate only about a quarter of all children but Lithuanians were allowed to organize their own private schools only after the Russian Revolution of 1905. As new schools were organized by various parishes as well as the Saulė Society in Kovno Governorate and Žiburys Society in Suwałki Governorate, Draugija published numerous articles on the state of education in the country and plans for improving it, discussed school curriculum, teaching methods, child psychology, debated Catholic and secular approaches to education, reported on education practices in other countries (United States, Scandinavia, Switzerland, Ukraine, etc.), popularized new scientific achievements and explained science topics (e.g. about paleontology, comets, telepathy). The Russian Revolution also brought class conflict and other social issues to the forefront. As Lithuanians organized the first societies for workers (e.g. Workers' Society of St. Joseph founded by Konstantinas Olšauskas or Society of Saint Zita), the magazine published articles debating the role of the Catholic Church, charities, mutual aid societies in addressing social issues, discussing socialism and bolshevism as well as broader concepts of sociology, eugenics, political economy, addressing more specific issues of Lithuanian emigration to United States or teetotalism.

=== Literature, language, history ===
The magazine promoted the preservation of cultural heritage and development of the Lithuanian cultural revival. Draugija published literary works and their critical reviews. Each issue began with poems by known and newly discovered Lithuanian authors as well as translated poems of foreign authors such as Johann Wolfgang von Goethe, Victor Hugo, Alexander Pushkin, Adam Mickiewicz. The magazine also published a few short stories by Lazdynų Pelėda, Šatrijos Ragana, Liudas Gira, Kazys Puida, and others. It published four dramas: Hamlet by William Shakespeare, a comedy by Roderich Benedix, a drama by Paul Heyse, and historical drama Kęstučio mirtis (Death of Kęstutis) by Maironis. Almost every more substantial new literary work in Lithuanian was critically reviewed by Draugija, frequently by its editor Jakštas. These reviews were compiled and published separately in two-volume Mūsų naujoji literatūra (Our New Literature) in 1923. Other articles were devoted to reviewing works of certain writers, including Jonas Krikščiūnas (Jovaras), Maironis, Žemaitė, Jonas Biliūnas, etc. Draugija also published historical studies on the Lithuanian literature, including on Dionizas Poška, Antanas Baranauskas, Liudvikas Adomas Jucevičius, Aušra. Juozas Gabrys published a synthesis that covered not only individual authors, but also the Lithuanian Chronicles and Lithuanian folklore. A few articles were published on foreign authors (Dante Alighieri, Fyodor Dostoevsky, Xenophon).

The magazine frequently published articles dealing with the Lithuanian language, its history, standardization, syntax, lexicon, often written by linguist Kazimieras Būga. In particular, the magazine dealt with identification of various loan words and barbarisms in Catholic texts and their replacement with Lithuanian equivalents. After the death of linguist Kazimieras Jaunius, one entire issue was dedicated to him. The magazine also published articles on the philosophy of language and Esperanto (translated from a work by Jan Baudouin de Courtenay). Draugija also published articles on topics from the history of Lithuania, for example about King Mindaugas, Battle of Grunwald, Reformation in Lithuania, Lithuanian press ban. Jakštas wrote numerous obituaries.

=== Other topics ===
Draugija supported Catholic ideas and worldview but also embraced reforms and progress and criticized ultra-conservatives. It published philosophical articles on the place of the Catholic faith in science and culture as well as articles on topics in religious philosophy, for example theosophy, mysticism, asceticism, evolution, logic, Polish Messianism. In politics, the periodical supported the Christian democracy and the Lithuanian Christian Democratic Party though it claimed to be a cultural and not a political magazine. It published some broader thoughts and comments on political topics, for example an article by Augustinas Voldemaras on the proposed Lithuania's autonomy, the League of Nations, human rights, democracy, Constituent Assembly of Lithuania. Each issue had about 8 to 12 pages devoted to overview of Polish and Russian press on Lithuania. Draugija denounced any Polish plans for cultural or political union with Lithuania. A specific issue discussed several times was the Polish language used in church services.

The magazine, in a way, it attempted to catalog Lithuanian publications and periodicals. Works of fiction received critical reviews, while periodicals were summarized presenting key ideas. Draugija presented content summaries of periodicals published in Lithuania and abroad in 1907–1914: Vilniaus žinios, Lietuvos žinios, Viltis, Šaltinis, Nedėldienio skaitymas, Vienybė, Lietuvos ūkininkas, Skardas, Katalikas, Žvaigždė, Kova, Draugas, Vadovas, Rygos garsas. It also published summaries of Polish, French, German periodicals as well as of foreign coverage of Lithuania. Draugija published a chronicle of social and cultural events in Lithuania.
