= Pranas Puskunigis =

Lithuanian musician

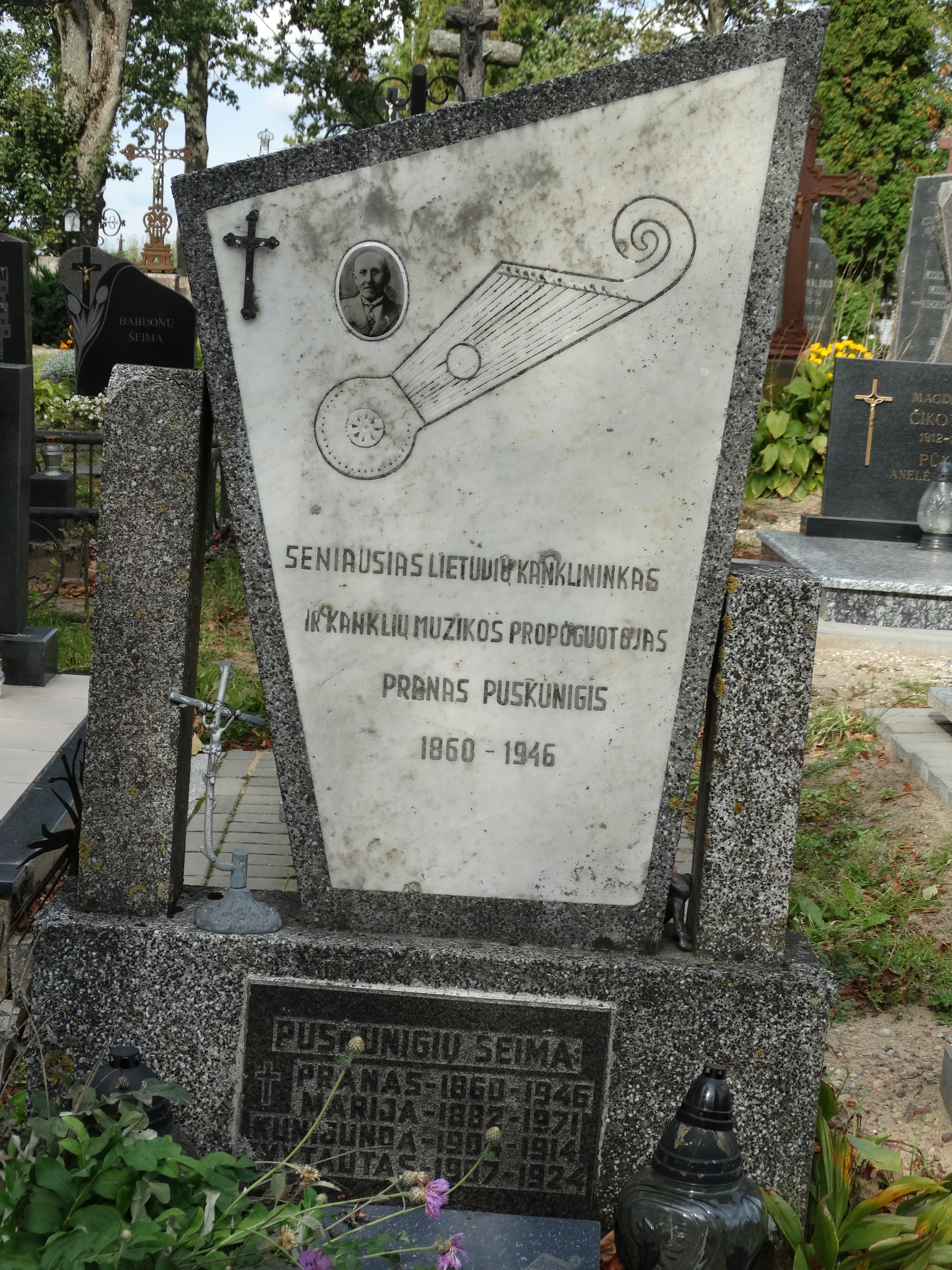
- Puskunigis' tombstone in Skriaudžiai
- Born: 16 July 1860; Katiliai, Congress Poland
- Died: 27 November 1946 (aged 86); Skriaudžiai, Lithuanian SSR
- Education: Veiveriai Teachers' Seminary
- Occupations: Musician, church organist

Pranas Puskunigis (16 July 1860 – 27 November 1946) was a Lithuanian musician, one of the first and most influential proponents of kanklės. During his life, he taught about 120 people how to play kanklės and established several ensembles, one of which is still active. He laid the groundwork for kanklės education and adapted numerous folk and professional songs to the instrument, but did not attempt to modify its design.

== Early life ==
Puskunigis was born on 16 July 1860 in the Katiliai village near Sintautai, Augustów Governorate, Congress Poland. His father was well respected in the community and acted as a priest in an emergency. Therefore, it is said that his nickname puskunigis (literally: half-priest) became the surname of his children. After three years at the Sintautai primary school, Puskunigis attended the Veiveriai Teachers' Seminary. But his mother's death forced him to abandon studies and return to farming.

He learned to play kanklės from his uncle, got introduced to a violin and clarinet in Veiveriai. In 1882, he moved to Kaunas where he worked at various churches and learned to play the piano and organ. For a time he lived in the United States, but returned in 1905 and settled in Skriaudžiai near Veiveriai. He had a small farm of 3.36 hectares (8.3 acres), but devoted his time and energy to the music. He once again became a church organist and organized an ensemble of kanklės players, mostly from the students at the Veiveriai Teachers' Seminary. Its first performance was in 1906 at the nearby Sasnava. This ensemble, known simply as Kanklės since 1984, continues to this day. Puskunigis manufactured numerous kanklės that had 11 or 12 strings.

== World War I and after ==
During World War I, Saliamonas Banaitis invited Puskunigis to establish an ensemble of kanklės players at his printing press in Kaunas. The ensemble began giving performances in late 1915. Accompanied by a student choir from the Saulė Gymnasium (led by Banaitis' son and future composer Kazimieras Viktoras Banaitis), the ensemble organized a concert at the Kaunas City Theater on 5 January 1916. The ensemble also performed at a fair in Königsberg. In 1922, Puskinigis was invited by General Vladas Nagevičius to organize an ensemble that would perform during the official state ceremonies at the Kaunas War Museum. He gathered a group of veterans of the Lithuanian Wars of Independence and experienced players from Skriaudžiai which debuted in May 1923 but due to conflicts the project was soon abandoned. Puskunigis was then invited by a school in Šančiai where he trained about 60 students. The school ensemble debuted at the Vytautas' the Great Church during the first Lithuanian Song Festival in 1924 and recorded several songs with the operatic tenor Kipras Petrauskas.

In June 1925, Puskunigis was one of the founders of the Kanklės Players' Society, chaired by Jonas Bendorius and Juozas Tallat-Kelpša. The same year Puskunigis was interviewed by Armas Otto Väisänen, the Finnish scholar of folk music. In 1925–1926, Puskunigis petitioned the Lithuanian government for a permit and funding to open Kanklės Musical School three times. The permit was finally received in 1930 and he became a teacher. Lithuanian composers, such as Juozas Naujalis and Juozas Gruodis, considered kanklės to be an obsolete instrument and did not support the efforts of Puskunigis. At the same time, Puskunigis protested efforts to improve and modernize kanklės. Therefore, he soon retired from the musical school and spent remainder of his life in Skriaudžiai. He spent the time correcting and organizing his writings – note sheets, original and translated articles, songs, poems. His son counted 48 songs created by Puskunigis. His most successful songs are Kanklininkų himnas (The Anthem of Kanklės Players) and Daina apie senovę (A Song about the Past). His textbook on kanklės was published in 1932. In 1937, he recorded 34 songs. He died in 1946 in Skriaudžiai. His home in Skriaudžiai was turned into a museum of the 19th-century lifestyle in 1987.
