= Society of Saint Casimir =

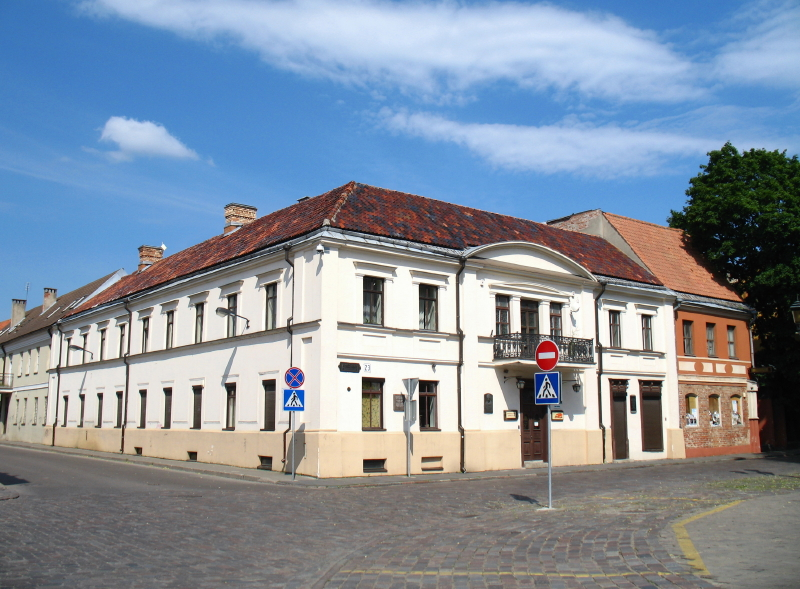
Former building of the printing press Šviesa

The Society of Saint Casimir (Lithuanian: Šv. Kazimiero draugija) was a Lithuanian society that published Lithuanian-language books and periodicals, many on Roman Catholic church and faith. Established in 1905, right after the Lithuanian press ban was lifted, the society published a total of about 740 books and several periodicals, including the first full Roman Catholic Bible translation into Lithuanian in six volumes in 1911–1937. From 1918 it operated its own printing press Šviesa. The society was liquidated after Lithuania was occupied by the Soviet Union in June 1940.

== Secret student society ==
The society can trace its roots to 1888 when Juozas Tumas-Vaižgantas organized a secret student society, known as the Lovers of Lithuania Society (Lietuvos mylėtojų draugija), at the Kaunas Priest Seminary. At that time Lithuania was part of the Russian Empire and Lithuanian-language books we banned by the Tsarist authorities. The society had a written program which emphasized service the church and Lithuania, use of the Lithuanian language, publication of Lithuanian religious literature, and development of Lithuanian patriotism. Leaving written evidence was dangerous as its activities were illegal and the members could easily be arrested by the Tsarist police. Therefore, the society split – Tumas-Vaižgantas and nine others established a less formal society. It became known as the Society of Saint Casimir when one of its members, Paulius Šilinskas, obtained relics of Saint Casimir, patron saint of Lithuania. The society translated into Lithuanian and published several books, including a work by Irish Cardinal Nicholas Wiseman, collection of gospels published by Józef Zawadzki in 1857, catechism by Roch Filochowski. At its peak as many as a third of the seminary students were its members, but the society was short-lived.

== Establishment ==
The Lithuanian press ban was lifted in 1904 and Lithuanian clergy returned to the idea of publishing religious literature in the Lithuanian language. In July 1905, about 40 priests gathered in Plungė to celebrate construction of a new church. They established a publishing company Šaltinis (stream, source), chaired by Vincentas Jarulaitis. Bishop of Samogitia Mečislovas Leonardas Paliulionis approved the initiative but was dissatisfied that the organization was not based in Kaunas. Therefore, he called a meeting of about 20 members of the clergy from three dioceses (Diocese of Samogitia, Diocese of Vilnius, and Diocese of Sejny) in October 1905. The priests included Povilas Januševičius, Juozas Tumas-Vaižgantas, Vladas Mironas, Alfonsas Petrulis. The meeting decided to establish a publishing company on 13 October 1905 in Kaunas. Its initial capital was set at 1,800 rubles and 1,200 rubles were transferred from Šaltinis.

Its new chairman, Adomas Dambrauskas-Jakštas, reorganized the company into a society which was officially registered on 16 October [O.S. 3 October] 1906. During its first official meeting on 30 November, the society registered 178 members. With the help of Bishop Paliulionis and Cardinal Serafino Cretoni, the society obtained an indulgence from Pope Pius X on 10 April 1907. Its members were granted full indulgence on joining the society, on the feast day of Saint Casimir, on four other feasts (i.e. Feast of the Immaculate Conception, Candlemas, Nativity of Saint John the Baptist, and Nativity of Mary), and on the deathbed. A partial indulgence for seven years and seven quadragenes was granted as well for praying on certain feasts.

== Activities ==
In the context of the Russian Revolution of 1905, the society harbored political aspirations. After the Great Seimas of Vilnius, the priests wanted to establish the Lithuanian Christian Democratic Party and, with the help of the society, publish Žiburys (light, beacon) magazine. However, these plans were opposed by Bishop Paliulionis and new chairman Dambrauskas-Jakštas did not adopt a political agenda.

The society started off by publishing small and cheap booklets, mostly translations. The first 13-page booklet on good confession was published in 50,000 copies and cost three kopeykas. Before 1918, the society published 231 numbered and four not numbered books. During its existence, the society published about 740 books. About a quarter of these were works of fictions. Lithuanian authors included Maironis, Vaižgantas, Lazdynų Pelėda. Other books were published on religious, scientific, popular topics. The society published the first full Roman Catholic Bible translation into Lithuanian in six volumes in 1911–1937. The translation was prepared by Archbishop Juozapas Skvireckas from the Vulgate. The society also published a textbook on the history of Lithuania by Antanas Alekna which was republished nine times in 1909–1934 and was the most widely used history textbook in interwar Lithuania. Alekna also wrote and the society published a book on the history of the church (three editions in 1919–1929) and a monograph on Bishop Motiejus Valančius (1922). It also published periodicals Nedėldienio skaitymas, Ateitis, Garnys, Vienybė, Žvaigždė, Ganytojas, Žemdirbys, Draugija, Rygos garsas.

The society also organized local chapters to distribute the publications and educate local residents on Catholic values and worldview. The chapters were also active in fighting illiteracy, smoking and alcohol consumption, organizing reputable entertainment (e.g. musical performances or sport competitions). By 1914, the society had some 10,000 members. The membership peaked at about 15,000 members, of which 56% were abroad – mostly in United States but also in Italy, Poland, Palestine, Latvia. By 1939, the membership dipped to 5,000 with about 1,000 members in United States.

In 1912, the society purchased premises near the Town Hall and the Kaunas Priest Seminary (present-day Rotušės a. 23). Most of its publications were published at the printing press of Saliamonas Banaitis which was located at the same building. The society purchased this press in 1918 and renamed it Šviesa (light). The society established a book shop at its headquarters in 1913. Later, smaller book shops were opened in Vilnius (1918), Šiauliai (1919), Telšiai, Ukmergė (1921), Tauragė, Radviliškis (1922), Panevėžys, Mažeikiai (1923), Laisvės alėja, Kaunas (1925), Vilkaviškis (1931), and Plungė (1932). It also had a candle workshop which produces candles for churches and distributed goods of foreign manufacturers such as microscopes by Ernst Leitz GmbH, typewriters by the Underwood Typewriter Company, radios by Radio H. Mende GmbH.

== Liquidation ==
The society was liquidated soon after Lithuania was occupied by the Soviet Union in June 1940. On 12 July, its chairman Mykolas Vaitkus was dismissed by the deputy Minister of the Interior of the People's Government of Lithuania. On 31 August, its name was changed to Raudonoji vėliava (Red Flag). The society was closed on 15 October 1940 by an order of the Council of People's Commissars of the Lithuanian SSR. Society's property was nationalized and unsold books were burned or recycled.

== Chairmen ==
Chairmen of the Society of Saint Casimir were:

- Vincentas Jarulaitis (1905–1906)
- Adomas Dambrauskas-Jakštas (1906–1938)
- Mykolas Vaitkus (1938–1940)
- Albertas Kleinas (acting, July–October 1940)

== Bibliography ==
- Baršys, Povilas (2015). Vasario 16-osios Akto signataras Saliamonas Banaitis. Iš Lietuvos nacionalinio muziejaus archyvo (in Lithuanian). Vol. 13. Vilnius: Lietuvos nacionalinis muziejus. ISBN 978-609-8039-63-4. ISSN 1648-2859.
- Bloznelis, Mindaugas; Zimnachaitė, Aldona (2008). "Šv. Kazimiero draugijos kelias". Kauno istorijos metraštis (in Lithuanian). 9. ISSN 2335-8734.
- Giedrienė, Rima (2013). "Pranckietis (Pronckietis) Kazimieras". Kraštiečiai (in Lithuanian). Radviliškio rajono savivaldybės viešoji biblioteka.
- Ivinskis, Zenonas (1936). "Antanas Alekna 1872—1930" (PDF). Suvažiavimo darbai (in Lithuanian). II. Lietuvių katalikų mokslo akademija. ISSN 1392-0499.
- Laukaitytė, Regina (1991). "Dėl Šv. Kazimiero draugijos steigimo 1905 metais" (PDF). Lietuvos istorijos metraštis (in Lithuanian). ISSN 0202-3342.
- Stonienė, Vanda (2006-01-17). "Šv. Kazimiero draugija". Visuotinė lietuvių enciklopedija (in Lithuanian). Mokslo ir enciklopedijų leidybos centras.
- Tapinas, Laimonas; et al., eds. (1997). ""Šviesa"" (PDF). Žurnalistikos enciklopedija (in Lithuanian). Vilnius: Pradai. ISBN 9986-776-62-7.
- "Šv. Kazimiero draugijos leidybinė veikla Kaune 1905–1918 m." (in Lithuanian). Kauno miesto savivaldybės Vinco Kudirkos viešoji biblioteka. 2016-01-26.
