= Adomas Jakštas =

Lithuanian Roman Catholic priest and activist

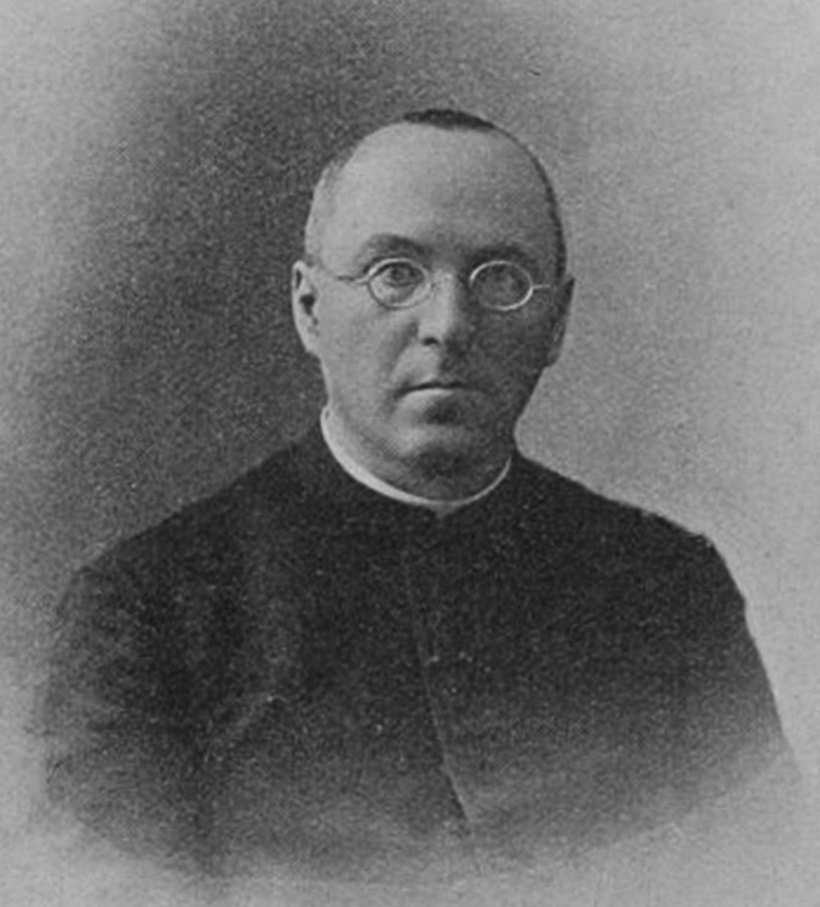
- Jakštas, c. 1910
- Born: Aleksandras Dambrauskas; 8 September 1860; Kuronys, Kovno Governorate, Russian Empire
- Died: 19 February 1938 (aged 77); Kaunas, Lithuania
- Resting place: Kaunas Cathedral Basilica
- Education: Kaunas Priest Seminary; Saint Petersburg Roman Catholic Theological Academy
- Occupations: Priest, publicist, poet, philosopher
- Political party: Lithuanian Christian Democratic Party
- Movement: Lithuanian National Revival
- Board member of: Society of Saint Casimir; Motinėlė Society; Lithuanian Catholic Academy of Science; Lithuanian Esperanto Association
- Awards: Order of Saint Anna; Order of the Lithuanian Grand Duke Gediminas

Adomas Jakštas was the pen name of Aleksandras Dambrauskas (8 September 1860 – 19 February 1938), a Lithuanian Roman Catholic priest and activist. He was a prolific author of newspaper articles, literary criticism, poetry, mathematical and philosophical works. He was also one of the early supporters of the Esperanto language.

Influenced by philosopher Vladimir Solovyov, Jakštas dropped out from the Saint Petersburg University and enrolled at the Kaunas Priest Seminary. He then completed his master's studies at the Saint Petersburg Roman Catholic Theological Academy and was ordained priest in 1888. Assigned to the Panevėžys Gymnasium, he enticed Catholic students to disobey orders to pray for the Tsar in an Eastern Orthodox church. This earned him a five-year internal exile to Ustyuzhna in the Novgorod Governorate. After return, he took various jobs until he was able to return to the Theological Academy as a professor of the Bible in 1902. However, he quit teaching in 1905 and devoted the rest of his life to various societies and writing. He became the long-term chairman of the Society of Saint Casimir which published Lithuanian periodicals and books and of the Motinėlė Society which provided scholarships to Lithuanian students. In 1907, Jakštas established and became editor of the monthly Draugija magazine which continued to be published until 1923. In independent Lithuania, he was the chairman of the Lithuanian Catholic Academy of Science (LKMA). He was also active in various Esperanto societies, becoming chairman of Espero (1903–1905) and a member of Akademio de Esperanto (1923–1937).

Jakštas published about 50 books and brochures and thousands of articles on a wide variety of topics. At different times, he edited five Lithuanian and one Esperanto periodical. Jakštas published numerous articles reviewing Lithuanian publication, both fiction and nonfiction. Jakštas held virtual monopoly on criticism of the Lithuanian literature for about twenty years. He was a harsh and conservative evaluator criticizing everything that was new. Therefore, literary historians, such as Mykolas Biržiška, criticized Jakštas for "damaging" Lithuanian literature and delaying its modernization. Jakštas published a number of polemic articles debating religion, art, Lithuanian–Polish relations, etc.

Jakštas published four poetry collections and three collections of translated and original humorous and satirical short stories and feuilletons. He prepared and published at least eight different prayer books and three hymnals (two with Juozas Naujalis). He studied mathematics independently and published several theoretical works of mathematics, but remained a hobbyist. He published three Lithuanian math textbooks on geometry, logic, and trigonometry. Jakštas was interested in the standardization of the Lithuanian language and published works promoting simpler spelling and criticizing the efforts of Jonas Jablonskis.

== Biography ==
=== Early life and education ===
Jakštas was born on 8 September [O.S. 27 August] 1860 in Kuronys near Pagiriai to a family of Lithuanian free peasants who owned about 20 hectares (49 acres) of land. Since there was more than one Dambrauskas family in the village, his family received Jakštas nickname from a local stream that he later adopted as his pen name. Jakštas had one brother and three half-siblings. Two of Jakštas' uncles were priests and he was raised in the Catholic spirit. After his mother's death in 1870, his primary education was sponsored by his uncles – attorney Petras Vaičiūnas and priest Stanislovas Dambrauskas, who took him to Kriukai.

In 1872, he enrolled at the Šiauliai Gymnasium where he penned his first poems in Polish. In 1880, he became a student at the Faculty of Mathematics of the Saint Petersburg University and attended lectures by chemist Dmitri Mendeleev, mathematician Konstantin Posse, philosopher Vladimir Solovyov. At the same time, he read the New Testament in Greek and The Imitation of Christ in French. After a year in Saint Petersburg, influenced by Solovyov's criticism of socialism and Russian Eastern Orthodox Church, he submitted an application to the Kaunas Priest Seminary.

In his short auto-biography, Jakštas admitted that after the first year at the seminary he seriously questioned his calling. At the seminary, Jakštas independently studied works on positivism (he particularly liked Les Sources of Auguste Joseph Alphonse Gratry), darwinism, materialism. Rector Antanas Baranauskas tasked him with numbering and cataloging 11,206 books at the seminary's library. He also secretly published four issues of the handwritten newsletter Lietuva – only the third Lithuanian-language periodical in the Russian Empire as Lithuanian-language texts were banned. After graduating in 1884, he received a scholarship from the Diocese of Samogitia to continue master's studies at the Saint Petersburg Roman Catholic Theological Academy. He graduated in 1888 and was ordained priest on 29 June 1888.

In addition to native Lithuanian, Jakštas also spoke Polish, Russian, Latin, German, French, and Esperanto. He could read in Latvian, Old Greek, and Hebrew.

=== Exile ===
Upon graduation, Jakštas was appointed as the chaplain to the Panevėžys Gymnasium but his tenure there lasted only half a year. On certain celebrations, all students regardless of their religious convictions, were forced to pray for the Tsar at an Eastern Orthodox church. Jakštas incited several Catholic students to disobey the orders and pray for the Tsar at a Catholic church. For such anti-Tsarist attitudes and activities, he was first sent to the Kretinga Bernardine Monastery and then deported for five years to Ustyuzhna in the Novgorod Governorate in June 1889. The government provided six rubles a month for support.

There he met another Lithuanian, Vincas Pietaris and encouraged him to write, editing his first works and sending them to the Lithuanian press to be published. Jakštas continued to study and write, and became a repeat contributor of articles to the Lithuanian newspaper Žemaičių ir Lietuvos apžvalga. He wrote a theological treatise in Russian Letters of a Catholic Theologian to an Eastern Orthodox Theologian which was later published by the Jesuits in Kraków.

=== Russian Empire ===
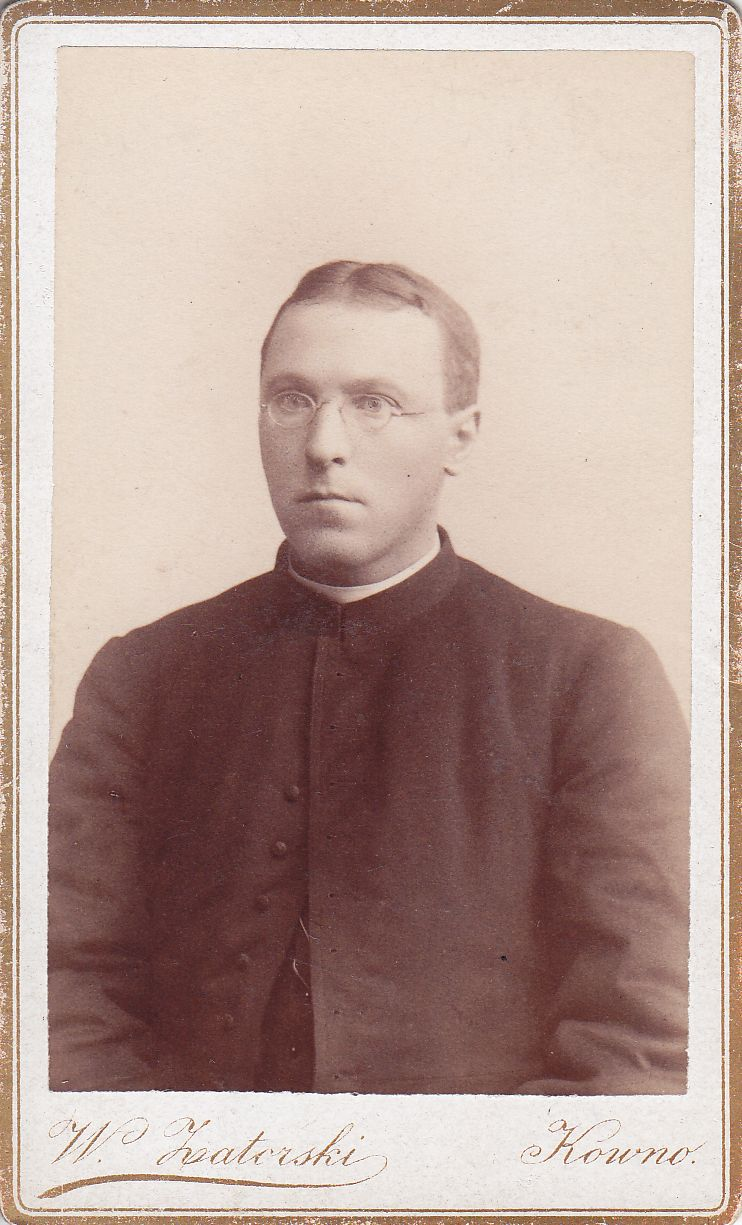
Jakštas in his youth

After five years in exile, Jakštas returned to Kaunas in May 1894. He worked as a chaplain of Kaunas Prison, confessor of soldiers, and administrator of the Church of St. Gertrude, but due to his tarnished record could not obtain a more permanent position until 1898 when he became a professor of canon law at the Kaunas Priest Seminary. In 1900–1902, he worked as a secretary of Bishop Mečislovas Leonardas Paliulionis. In 1901, he published an article on the doctrine of the Russian Church on the canon of the Old Testament in the French journal Revue Biblique. In this article, Jakštas attempted to prove that deuterocanonical books were not considered cannon in Eastern Orthodoxy. It is likely that this article helped him to return to the Saint Petersburg Roman Catholic Theological Academy as a professor of the Bible in 1902. He was recognized as a talented teacher and was awarded the Order of Saint Anna (3rd class). At the same time, he taught religion at Saint-Petersburg Elizabethan Institute and Kseniinsky Institute (schools for noble girls).

Feeling that teaching kept him away from Lithuanian causes, he quit teaching after the Russian Revolution of 1905 and returned to Kaunas. He became chairman of the Society of Saint Casimir established to publish Lithuanian books after the Lithuanian press ban was lifted in 1904. He chaired this society until his death. By that time, it published about 690 books, including the first full Roman Catholic Bible translation into Lithuanian in six volumes in 1911–1937, and nine periodicals. In 1907, Jakštas established and became editor of the monthly Draugija magazine geared towards the Lithuanian intelligentsia which continued to be published until 1923. Draugija's supplement for Catholic youth Ateitis (Future) gave rise to the Lithuanian Catholic Federation Ateitis. Jakštas helped organizing Ateitis, formulated it ideology, and was mentor of Pranas Dovydaitis and Stasys Šalkauskis, leaders of Ateitis. In 1907, Jakštas became one of the founders and long-term chairman of the Motinėlė Society which provided scholarships to Lithuanian students.

In May 1914, Pranciškus Karevičius, the new Bishop of Samogitia, promoted Jakštas to prelate of the Samogitian cathedral chapter. In November 1914, General Vladimir Grigoriev, commander of the Kaunas Fortress, expelled Jakštas and other "unreliable elements" from Kaunas. Jakštas moved to Vilnius. In October 1915, after Vilnius was occupied by Germany, Jaštas returned to Kaunas where he taught philosophy at Kaunas Priest Seminary. In 1919, Jakštas attempted to organize the Homer Society to gather and publish collective memories of World War I in Lithuania, but the idea did not take off.

=== Independent Lithuania ===
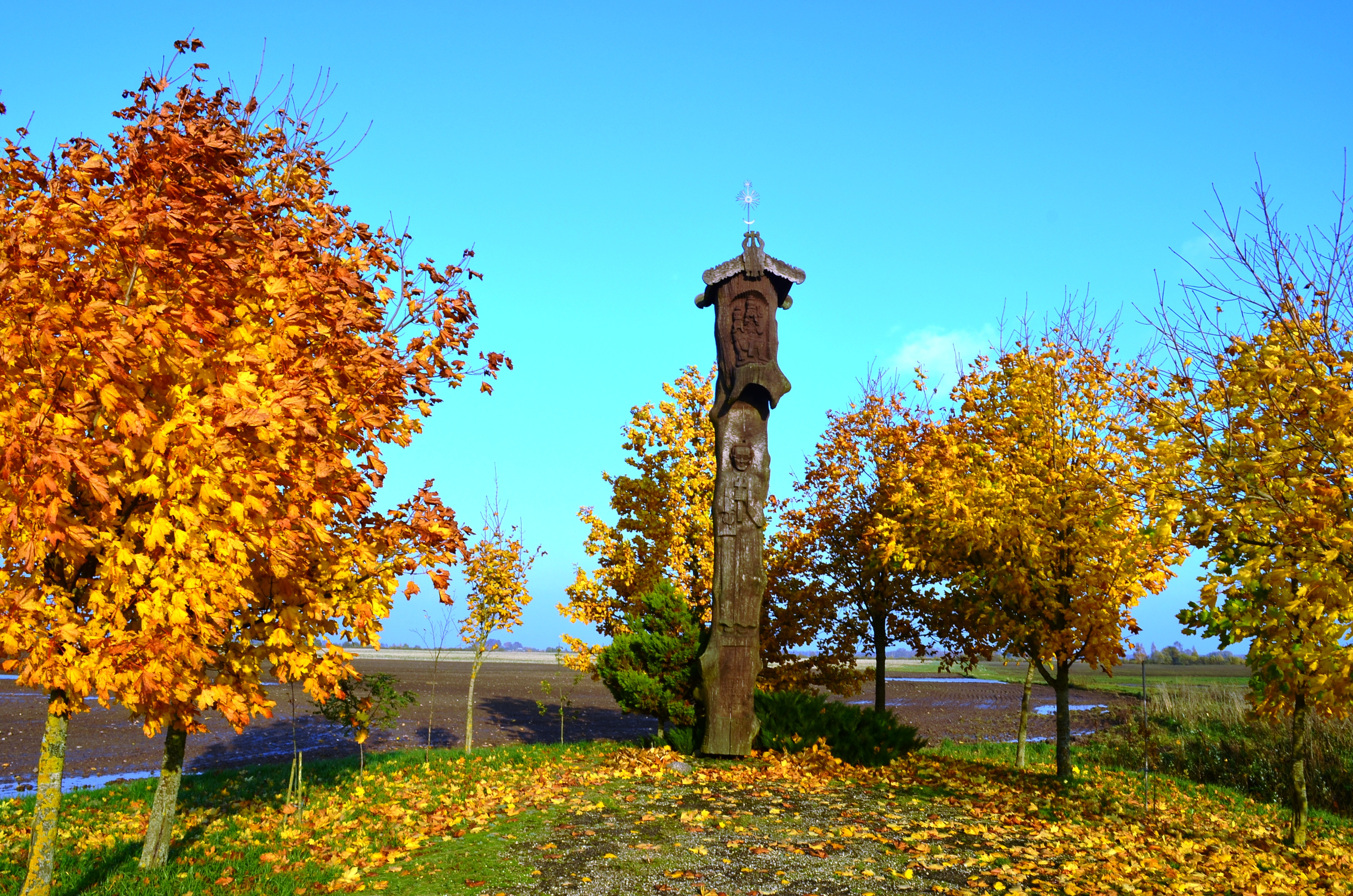
Monument to Jakštas at his birthplace

In independent Lithuania, Jaštas stayed away from political life. He became quickly disillusioned with the Lithuanian Christian Democratic Party and became its critic, though he kept it mostly private. He did not have a job with the church or government institutions and devoted his time to research, writing, and various societies.

In 1922, Jakštas was one of the co-founders of the Lithuanian Catholic Academy of Science (LKMA). He succeeded bishop Juozapas Skvireckas as its chairman in 1926; he continued to chair the academy until his death. Jakštas with Stasys Šalkauskis and Pranas Dovydaitis became the first three true academic members of LKMA. In 1927, Jakštas initiated the compilation of a biographical dictionary of famous Lithuanians, regardless of religious or political beliefs. In total, 2,638 biographies or five volumes were prepared by LKMA, but they were not published. Instead, LKMA collaborated in preparing Lietuviškoji enciklopedija, the first Lithuanian encyclopedia.

In 1935–1937, Jakštas chaired a committee that organized the Lithuanian section at the World Exhibition of the Catholic Press in Vatican. Jakštas completed a doctorate thesis on Christian views of the Roman Empire in 1937. It was favorably evaluated by professors of Vytautas Magnus University, but it appears that Jakštas did not defend it.

=== Death and characteristic ===
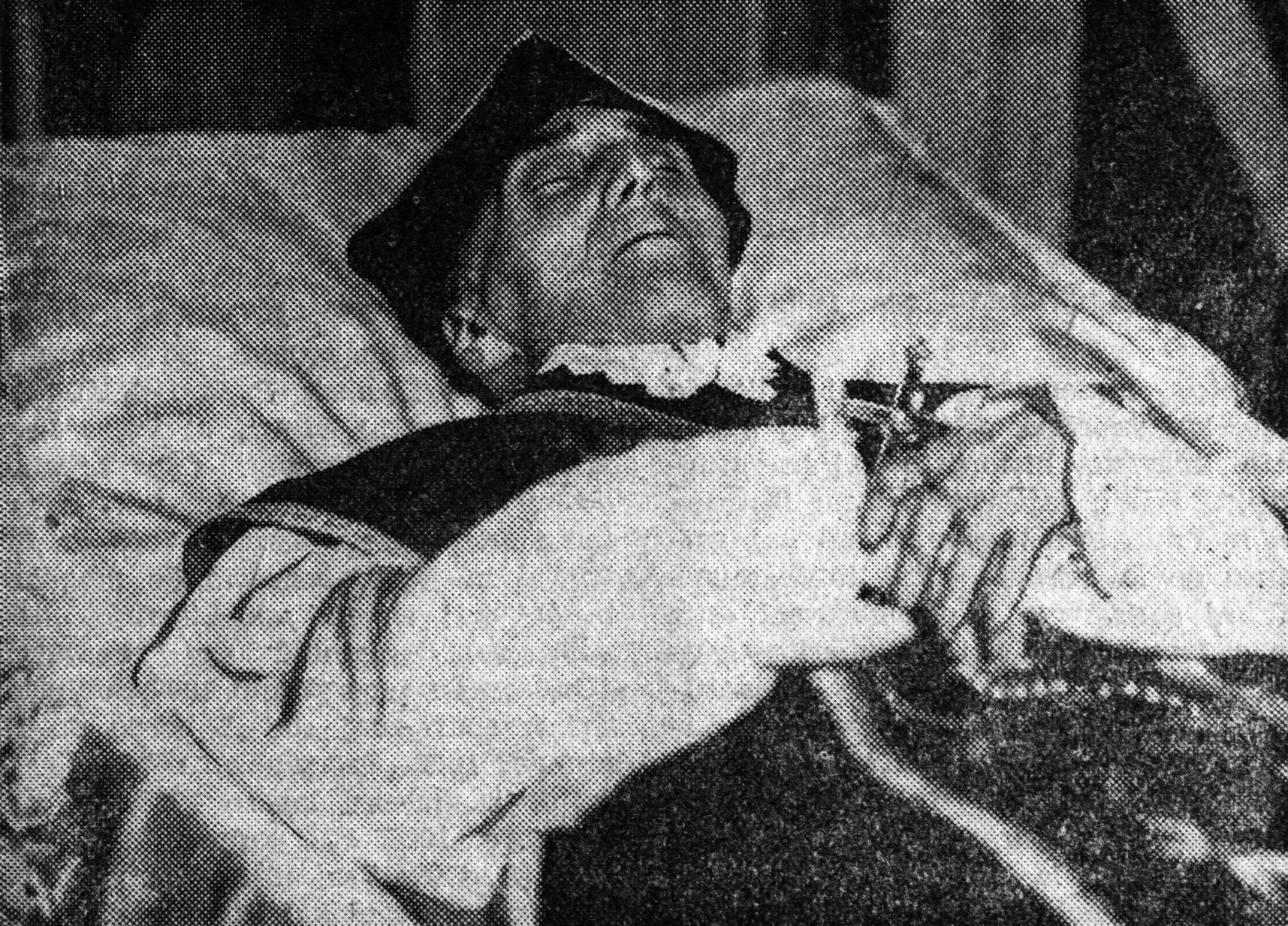
Funeral photo of Jakštas

Jakštas lived a rather simple and ascetic lifestyle. He was hard working, orderly, and punctual. He was most likely to be found in his bed resting, at his desk working, or praying in a church. He was not a good public speaker and avoided verbal debates (though he liked to debate in writing). He presented as a reserved and melancholy man. His apartment was sparsely furnished; he did not have rugs or a sofa. Jakštas did not receive many guests, but those included Eduards Volters, Vincas Krėvė-Mickevičius, and Vytautas Andrius Graičiūnas with Unė Babickaitė. He was a close personal friend of bishop Pranciškus Karevičius. Jakštas strictly abstained from alcohol. Literary critic Vincas Maciūnas quipped that Jakštas belonged to the Puritan Victorian era. However, Jakštas was also known for brief impulsive outbursts. While in his writings Jakštas was not afraid to criticize, he was rather tolerant of other ideologies. For example, he asked for an amnesty for writer Kostas Korsakas when he was arrested by the Lithuanian police for communist activities.

Jakštas continued working and editing various texts until his death. He died on 19 February 1938 of calcified arteries and kidneys. At the time of his death he had a rather modest sum of about 2,000 Lithuanian litas which he left to his relative studying at the priest seminary, Christ's Resurrection Church, a chapter of Ateitis at Vytautas Magnus University, and charitable Society of Vincent de Paul. In his last will, he wished to be buried without speeches and flowers. Nevertheless, the Lithuanian government organized an official funeral. He was buried on 21 February in a crypt of Kaunas Cathedral Basilica. Three months later, he was reburied in the churchyard.

== Works ==
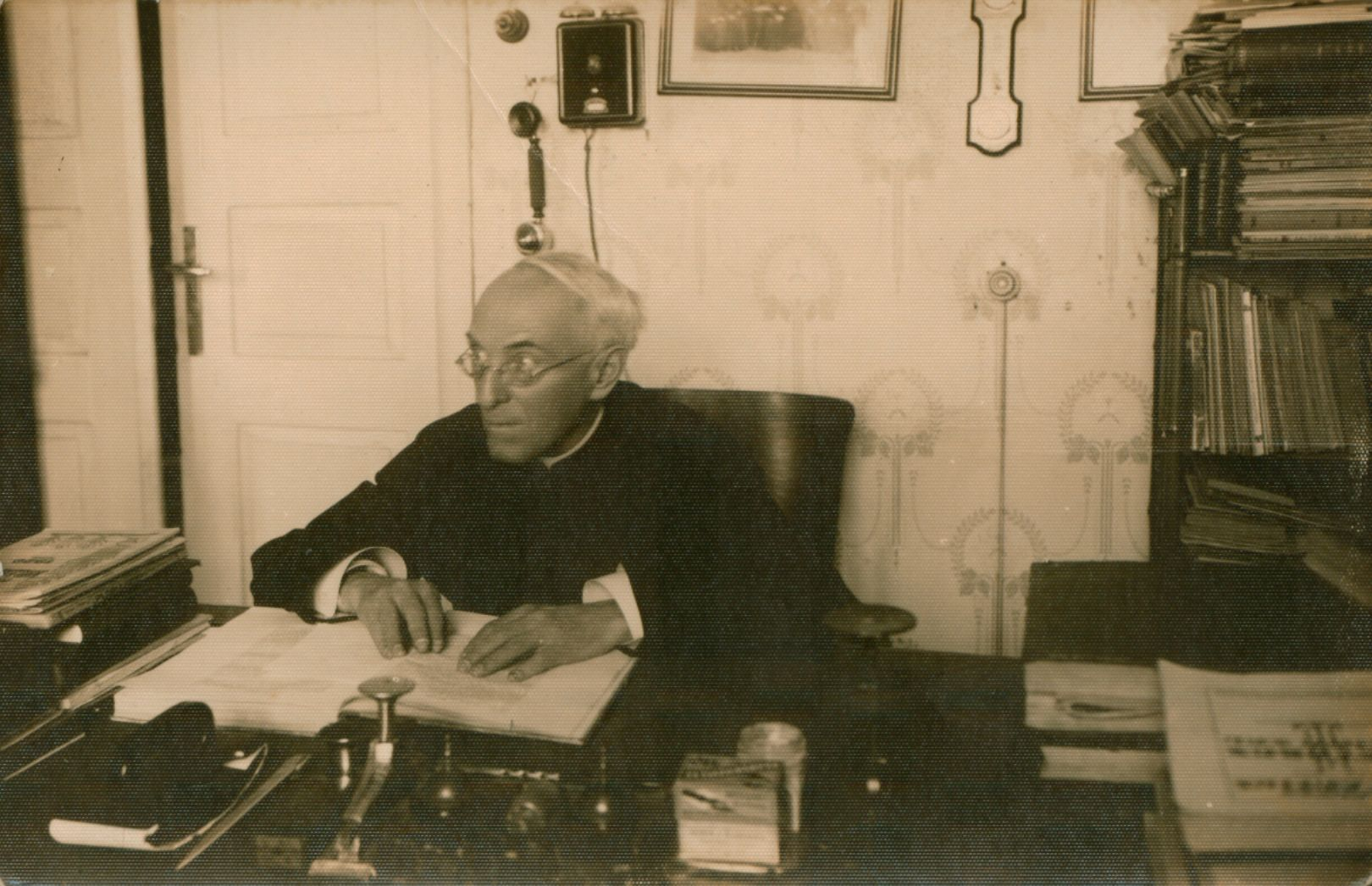
Jakštas at his home in 1930s

Jakštas published about 50 books and brochures (more than 9,000 pages) and thousands of articles on a wide variety of topics. He published his works mostly in Lithuanian, but also in Polish, Latin, French, Russian, and Esperanto. Jaštas was a versatile writer, working on multiple fields of study at the same time. In his works, he leaned towards synthesis rather than analysis.

His works have not been collected or subject to a comprehensive study in part because of the wide-ranging expertise that would be required by researchers. Selected works of Jakštas were compiled and published in three volumes in 1995–1997.

He usually signed religious works with his real name, while secular works were usually signed under his pen name Jakštas. He also used other pen names, including Druskius and Kuronietis.

=== Periodicals and journalism ===
Jakštas edited Lithuanian periodicals Lietuva (1883), Nedėldienio skaitymas (1906–1907), Draugija (1906–1914 and 1919–1923), Ateitis (1911–1914 and 1916–1919), satirical Garnys (1910–1914 and 1924–1929) as well as Esperanto Litova Stelo (1922–1926). Jakštas and Juozas Tumas-Vaižgantas were the most prominent Catholic newspaper contributors and editors in pre-1918 Lithuania.

Jakštas published numerous polemic pieces. He debated theology with Pranciškus Būčys, relationship between religion and science with Vincas Čepinskis, aesthetics with Balys Sruoga and Vincas Mykolaitis-Putinas, nudity in art with Justinas Vienožinskis, pedagogy with Juozas Gobis, etc.

In Draugija, Jakštas published a regular column with a review of almost every more significant article on Lithuania in the Polish and Russian periodicals. In his articles, Jakštas frequently wrote about the relationship between Lithuanians and Poles. He defended the Lithuanian National Revival and refuted Polish dreams of resurrecting the old Polish–Lithuanian Commonwealth. In 1902, he published a separate brochure in Polish Głos Litwinów (Lithuanian Voice) in which he urged members of the Lithuanian nobility to support Lithuanian national aspirations. After criticism from the Polish camp, he published a follow up brochure Jedność czy separatyzm? (Unity or Separatism) in which he rebutted the accusations of separatism. Poles in Vilnius responded with a brochure titled Never and Polish–Lithuanian relations continued to deteriorate. He also published a Lithuanian brochure Kas tu esi? (1911) and French Lituaniens et Polonais (1913; republished from Les Annales des Nationalités published by the Union des Nationalités).

After the Russian Revolution of 1905, Jakštas published four brochures in 1906–1907 that criticized socialism and revolutions and argued for calm, steady work and improvements (i.e. evolution and not revolution). In 1909, Jakštas was fined 300 Russian rubles for publishing an article about the Polish and Russian press in Lithuania in Draugija which, according to Russian censors, incited hostility towards the Eastern Orthodox Church.

In independent Lithuania, Jakštas published less in periodicals. He mostly commented on current issues (for example, the concordat, constitution of Lithuania, emigration, press censorship, education). A collection of his selected articles was published in 1930.

=== Literary criticism ===
Jakštas published numerous articles on the Lithuanian literature, both fiction and nonfiction. Jakštas held virtual monopoly on criticism of the Lithuanian literature for about twenty years. These critical reviews were collected and published in two volumes (total 1203 pages) in 1923–1924 by the Ministry of Education. Just before his death, Jakštas collected a third volume of his reviews, but it was not published. He did not enjoy writing reviews and considered it a "difficult and boring" task, but felt it was needed.

While Jakštas published several articles on aesthetics, he did not formulate a comprehensive system of principles. They key criteria in evaluating works was whether they manifested the eternal logos which is reflected by goodness and beauty and characterized by harmony and unity. He considered works that do not manifest logos to be immoral and unaesthetic. In addition, he demanded virtue and decency from artists. For example, he disliked and criticized portrayals of the naked human body.

Jakštas was a conservative evaluator and criticized everything that was new. Of the new art movements, Jakštas somewhat tolerated only Symbolism. He disliked Expressionism and fiercely attacked Futurism. For example, he highly valued the traditional poetry of Maironis and was a relentless critic of the modernist Keturi vėjai literary movement both in literary and moral terms. Such views applied not only to literature, but also visual arts. For example, Jakštas did not value the paintings of Mikalojus Konstantinas Čiurlionis.

Jakštas had good intuition and could recognize early talent, but was a harsh and biting critic, sometimes crossing into rudeness and insults. For example, he wrote about the expressionists poems of Butkų Juzė: "A red flag, red fire, and occasionally red lips of a girl – these are the three inspirations of Butkų Juzė". He did not spare criticism for either allies or adversaries. Many felt insulted and Jakštas was disliked or feared. According to Mykolas Vaitkus, writers Vincas Mykolaitis-Putinas, Salomėja Nėris, Balys Sruoga, and Sofija Kymantaitė-Čiurlionienė feared Jakštas' criticism. Mykolas Biržiška criticized Jakštas for "damaging" Lithuanian literature and delaying its modernization.

In 1920, Jakštas negatively evaluated the first poetry book of Balys Sruoga. In response, Sruoga published a rebuke of Jakštas' criticism in the literary magazine Baras in 1925. Sruoga attacked Jakštas for criticizing all the prominent contemporary Lithuanian poets (Kazys Binkis, Ignas Šeinius, Bernardas Brazdžionis, Jurgis Savickis, Juozas Tysliava, etc.) while praising little-known Catholic authors. Sruoga found no redeeming qualities in Jakštas' criticisms and this evaluation was repeated by many other authors, particularly in Soviet Lithuania. This marked the decline in Jakštas' influence in the literary circles. He refused to join the Lithuanian Writers' Society established in 1932 due to his opposition to modernist literature and realization of his diminished influence. In late 1920s and early 1930s, in their private correspondence, writers considered Jakštas to be senile and his criticism a source of amusement.

=== Poetry and fiction ===
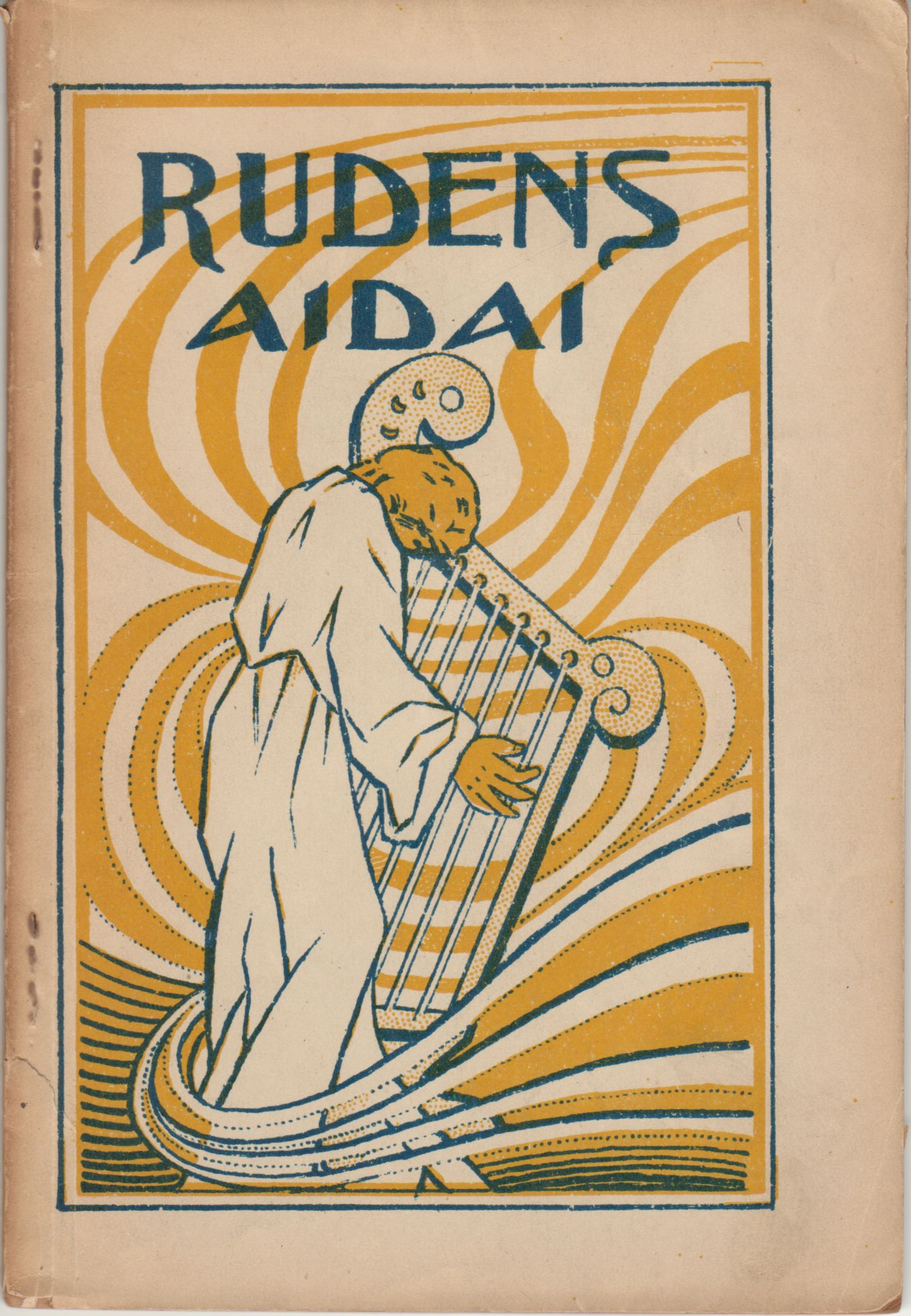
Cover page of Rudens aidai (1920)

Jakštas published his first poem Giesmė prasčiokėlio, nemokančio rašyti (Hymn of an Illiterate Bumpkin) in Aušra in 1884. It was an imitation of a poem by Władysław Syrokomla. He later published his poems in other Lithuanian periodicals, including Žemaičių ir Lietuvos apžvalga, Tėvynės sargas, Lietuvių laikraštis, Nedėldienio skaitymas. He published four poetry collections – Dainų skrynelė (1894, reprinted 1905), Nakties matymai (1906), and Rudens aidai (1911, 1920), and Lirika (1930). He also published three collections of translated and original humorous and satirical short stories and feuilletons – Neva juokai, neva ašaros (1915), Svetimos gėlės (1923), and Šypt-šypt (two parts in 1930–1931). Finally, he published a short theatre play Nebaigtas pamokslas (1918).

As a gymnasium student, Jakštas read the full works of the Polish Enlightenment poet Ignacy Krasicki and textbook on classical poetry by Filip Neriusz Golański which left a deep impression. Jakštas' poetry is traditional and he paid close attention to correct lyrical form and rhyme. He particularly liked dactyl. Even though Jakštas wrote poetry for about fifty years, it is difficult to see evolution in form or in content. According to Vincas Mykolaitis-Putinas, characteristic features of his poetry include lack of emotions, dominance of reason, clarity of thought, light irony and humor, and dry and semi-prosaic style.

According to Antanas Maceina, Jakštas explored the relationship between humans, nature, and God and arrived to his main thesis that God manifests through nature and humans. Therefore, his poetry is meditative, often merging religious imagery with scenes from nature. It reflects deep religious thought, even religious ecstasy. In other poems, Jakštas reflected on the short and fragile human life. His only solace was not earthy comforts (happiness, love, etc.) but the hope for eternal peace in heaven. Jakštas, influenced by the Lithuanian National Revival and romantic nationalism, also wrote patriotic poems contrasting the glorious past with the miserable present and calling others to work for the benefit of the nation. When Lithuania regained its independence, Jakštas urged others to treasure and protect it. He also wrote satires poking fun at Polonized Lithuanian nobles, socialists and communists, new elites who emerged in post-independence, and others as well as parodies of other Lithuanian literary works.

Several Lithuanian composers (including Juozas Tallat-Kelpša, Juozas Naujalis, Konradas Kaveckas, Juozas Karosas, Jurgis Tilvytis, Antanas Vanagaitis) created music for Jakštas' poems. However, overall, his poetry is not particularly valued by literary critics as it is very similar yet inferior to the poetry of Maironis. His satires are more original and more valued. According to Motiejus Miškinis, Jakštas' poetry had little influence on other Lithuanian authors.

Jakštas translated poetry of about sixty different authors, mainly from Russia, Austria, and Germany. He also translated prose works, mainly satirical texts. He particularly liked Mikhail Zoshchenko and frequently published his translations in Garnys.

=== Mathematics ===
Jakštas became interested in mathematics as a gymnasium student. A new teacher was very demanding and strict, and Jakštas almost failed the subject. He then studied independently and two years later attempted to solve the classical problems of angle trisection, squaring the circle, and doubling the cube. In 1924, he published a book on these problems. In this work, he presented two new approximate methods to solve the squaring the circle problem.

Jakštas published a work on trigonometric functions in Esperanto in 1906, in French in 1908, and in Lithuanian in 1922. In this work, building upon the works of Nikolai Lobachevsky, he described a set of trigonometric functions that were not based on a circle but other curves. While Jakštas independently discovered them, they were not new in the field of mathematics. In 1906, he published another work in Esperanto about the Fermat's Last Theorem and Euclid's fifth postulate. In 1926, he published an article Kas yra tiesioji linija? (What is the Straight Line?) in which he attempted to redefine a straight line, but was constrained by the Euclidean geometry (he did not transition to the non-Euclidean geometry). While Jakštas published several theoretical works of mathematics, he did not have specialized education and remained a hobbyist.

Jakštas saw mathematics as complementary to theology and philosophy. For example, while at the priest seminary, he attempted to find mathematical proof for God's existence. In 1921, he published a work on the Divine Proportion – a mathematical and objective measure of beauty and harmony. He claimed that harmony exists if sizes of two objects satisfy the golden ratio. He searched for this proportion in poetry, music, architecture, anatomy, botany. It was an elaboration of ideas proposed by the Polish novelist Bolesław Prus that Jakštas first described in 1907.

Jakštas published three Lithuanian math textbooks: on geometry in 1915, logic and trigonometry in 1919. The geometry textbook was translated from works Pavel Miranov. The logic textbook is considered to be the first textbook on the subject in Lithuanian. It was based on Thomist works of Désiré-Joseph Mercier and positivist works of Georgy Chelpanov. It was republished in 1922 with a glossary of 137 terms which played a positive role in the Lithuanian terminology. The second edition expanded upon the ideas of mathematical logic. It was the most popular logic textbook in interwar Lithuania. The geometry textbook was written in more technical language and included a chapter on the new trigonometric functions that Jakštas described in 1906. Therefore, the textbook did not become very popular and schools relied more on the textbook by Pranas Mašiotas.

In 1907, Jakštas also published an article about mathematical interests and works of bishop Antanas Baranauskas which provided much new biographical information.

=== Philosophy ===
Jakštas studied the philosophical problems of epistemology, logic, ethics, aesthetics, and natural sciences. His philosophical views were influenced by the ideas of his professor Vladimir Solovyov, Józef Maria Hoene-Wroński and Polish Messianism, and Thomism. Jakštas' views shifted during the years. He held views similar to Platonism, moderate realism, positivism, but acquaintance with P. D. Ouspensky marked a radical shift in his philosophy. However, he later returned to Platonic realism. Jakštas opposed materialism, atheism, and socialism.

Jakštas believed in the coexistence of religion, science, and philosophy, and that their synthesis brings true knowledge. This was similar to "full truth" or "integral knowledge" (celnoje znanije) proposed by Solovyov, but it was an abstract and idealist concept while Jakštas attempted to be more specific and practical. Jakštas considered Thomism to be a limited philosophical system and suggested supplementing it with the ideas of Solovyov and with the new scientific discoveries in biology, physics, chemistry, etc. Thus, he wanted to renew everything in Christ. Jakštas stated that one can get to know God through his creations – nature was God's book just like the Bible. However, because Jakštas was not a theoretician but more a practitioner, he never fully developed a cohesive philosophical system. Many of his articles are fragmentary, focused on a specific narrow issue.

Jakštas is considered the pioneer of Christian ethics in Lithuania. His two main works on ethics Pikto problema (The Issue of Evil; 1935) and Aukščiausias gėris (The Highest Good; 1937) were published just before his death. They were written as dialogues copying the example of Plato. Jakštas influenced the early philosophy of Stasys Šalkauskis who wrote his thesis on Solovyov.

=== Religion and theology ===
Jakštas published a number of biographies of the clergy, including Pope Benedict XV, bishops Gasparas Cirtautas and Pranciškus Karevičius. Užgesę žiburiai (Extinguished Lights), edited by Juozas Tumas-Vaižgantas, with 22 biographies of Lithuanians and 14 biographies of non-Lithuanians, was published in 1930. This work contained biographies of 18 Lithuanian priests. He also wrote on topics from the church history in Lithuania (missionary Andrius Rudamina, bishop Merkelis Giedraitis, Reformation in Lithuania, etc.).

He prepared and published at least eight different prayer books, including specialized books for children, visually impaired, and members of the third order. He published several works on apologetics, including a series of polemic articles addressed to the adherents of the Eastern Orthodox Church which were published in a separate book in 1904. In 1920s, he published books What Science Can Tell about the Apocalypse and the Apocalyptic Number 666, Secrets of Faith, Human Soul.

In 1886, Jakštas published a hymnal translated from Polish (music score created by Juozas Kalvaitis). He later published two hymnals with Juozas Naujalis in 1920 and 1923. In his poetry collection Lirika (1930), Jakštas included 40 hymns, of which at least 33 were translated from German. These hymns were not well received by critics. For example, Antanas Petrika wrote that they were a "rhymed catechism" without artistry or beauty, while Vladas Kulbokas wrote that the hymns were "sentimental moralizations". Vincas Mykolaitis-Putinas defended Jakštas writing that while his hymns were "colorless" they were well suited for church choirs.

=== Esperanto ===
==== Esperanto societies ====
Jakštas became interested in Esperanto just few months after the publication of Unua Libro in 1887. He became personally acquainted with L. L. Zamenhof, creator of Esperanto, and they continued to correspond. Jakštas believed in the idea that a common neutral language could bring people together, eliminate national hatred, and lead to world peace even though he understood that different languages and religions are not reasons, merely pretexts, for wars. He also hoped that Esperanto would lessen the need for Lithuanian students to learn multiple languages (in 1890, Lithuanian schools taught six different foreign languages).

He joined the Russian Espero society in Saint Petersburg and was its chairman in 1903–1905. In 1905, Jakštas attended the first World Esperanto Congress in Boulogne-sur-Mer, France. At this congress, he was elected to the Language Committee. He was a member of Akademio de Esperanto from 1923 to 1937. The Esperanto Society of Kaunas was registered in December 1909 and held its first meeting in January 1910. Jakštas was elected its vice-chairman. Jakštas supported the establishment of the International Union of Catholic Esperantists in 1910. When the Lithuanian Esperanto Association was established in August 1919, Jakštas was elected its chairman and served until 1928.

==== Esperanto publications ====
Already in 1890, Jakštas translated Esperanto textbook Unua Libro into Lithuanian and published it in Tilsit (now Sovetsk, Kaliningrad Oblast); The 60-page second edition appeared in 1908. He also edited as well as added an introduction and a Catholic hymn to an Esperanto textbook by Stasys Tijūnaitis and had the Society of Saint Casimir publish it in 1912. Another Esperanto textbook, published in 1918 in the United States, included three original Esperanto poems by Jakštas, including one dedicated to Pope Leo XIII.

He published two Esperanto works on mathematics in 1906 and a philosophical work in 1908. In 1923, he edited and contributed three articles to Litova Almanaco, a collection of articles on Lithuanian literature and culture. Jakštas wrote a few original poems in Esperanto. They were published in Lingvo Internacia and a separate poetry collection Versaĵareto (1905). Fundamenta Krestomatio (first edition in 1903) included three poems by Jakštas (two were translations of Lithuanian folk songs). He also published two collections of Esperanto songs with sheet music in 1902 and 1912.

Jakštas contributed articles to Espero Katolika, magazine published by the International Union of Catholic Esperantists. In 1922, he founded and edited Esperanto magazine Litova Stelo, which was discontinued in 1926. The magazine wrote about Lithuanian culture, politics, economy and was oriented towards Esperanto speakers abroad. Some of these articles were translated and published in German, Dutch, Czech press.

Jakštas published several translations to Esperanto, including poems by Antanas Baranauskas and Vincas Kudirka, and play King of Judea by Grand Duke Konstantin Konstantinovich of Russia. In 1930, Jakštas published Zamenhoff's biography in Lithuanian; it was republished in 2002.

=== Lithuanian language ===
At the end of the 19th century, Lithuanians spoke in various dialects and there was no widely accepted standard Lithuanian grammar or spelling. Jakštas had his own ideas on the standardization of Lithuanian, and frequently criticized the efforts of Jonas Jablonskis. He particularly disliked Jablonskis' spelling and published two brochures on spelling in 1914 and 1920. Jakštas promoted the principle that each sound should have its own letter and suggested writing affricates with a single letter. He promoted simple, easy, uncomplicated spelling that not necessarily followed philological principles such as etymology or phonetics. In more practical terms, he disputed the need to mark long vowels or use ogoneks. For example, he suggested using a single letter i instead of i, į, and y.

Jakštas supported Kazimieras Būga and published his numerous linguistic articles in Draugija. When writing reviews of various Lithuanian publications, Jakštas made suggestions for standard word forms (for example, future tense of gyventi and pinti were adopted), combated barbarisms and poorly constructed neologisms, criticized the use of dialects as a sign of provincialism. However, many of his suggestions were not sufficiently substantiated and not widely accepted as Jakštas lacked philological education. Nevertheless, recognizing his efforts, the Lithuanian Language Society elected Jakštas as its honorary member in 1935.

Lithuanian prayers were full of loan words and barbarisms. Therefore, in 1909, priests Jakštas, Juozas Laukaitis, and Alfonsas Petrulis formed a committee to review and revise the Lord's Prayer and other Christian prayers. They were assisted by linguists, but in a few instances they did not dare change the almost 400-year tradition and fully implement linguists' suggestions. However, they much improved the language and the revised prayers were officially adopted at the end of World War I.

By writing Lithuanian works on mathematics, theology, and philosophy, Jakštas had to create a number of Lithuanian words for technical terms. In 1921, Jakštas became a member of a commission organized by the Ministry of Education to standardize Lithuanian terminology. This commission began replacing well-established international terms with Lithuanian neologisms. This attracted criticism and a new commission was set up in 1925.

== Personal library ==
Jakštas was a librarian of the cathedral chapter of Kaunas and of the Society of Saint Casimir (this library was kept in his apartment). Jakštas also had a rich personal library which had 5,677 books at the end of 1934; 1,278 books related to mathematics and other exact sciences. In his last will, he left the books to Kaunas Priest Seminary.

== Recognition ==
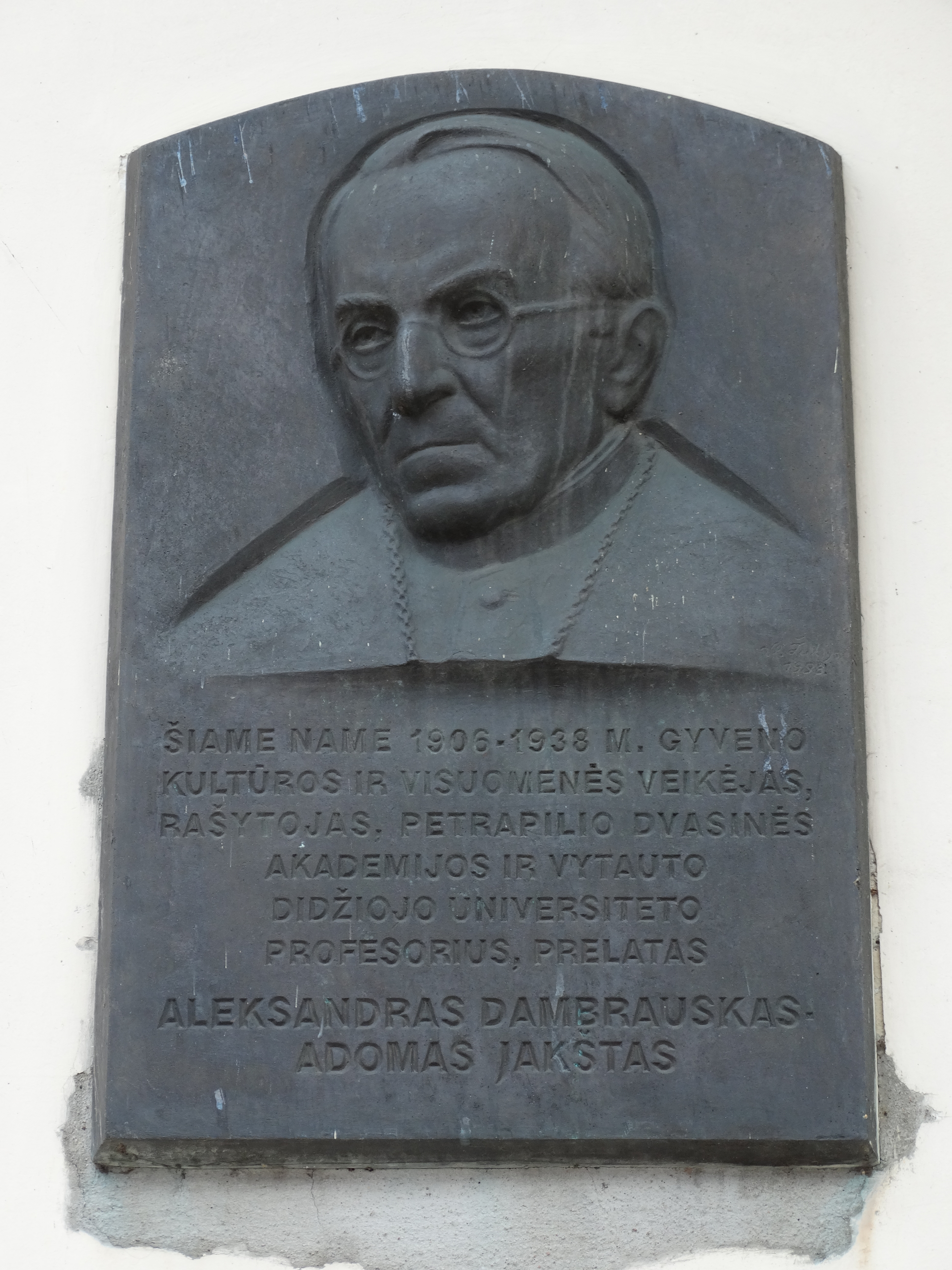
Memorial plaque to Jakštas in Kaunas installed in May 1998

Jakštas was awarded several honorary titles by Vytautas Magnus University: honorary professor (1922), honorary professor of the Theology and Philosophy Faculty (1926), honorary doctor of the Nature and Mathematics Faculty (1928) and of the Humanities Faculty (1932). He was recognized as honorary doctor of Kaunas University of Technology in 1999. In 1928, he was awarded the Order of the Lithuanian Grand Duke Gediminas (2nd degree).

In Soviet Lithuania, Jakštas was derided as a Catholic dogmatic and fanatic. He was described as a "clerical, reactionary, bourgeois ideologist". While his contribution to the Lithuanian culture could not be completely erased, it was minimized. From 1944 to 1958, only one article devoted to Jakštas was published in Soviet Lithuania; its headline referred to Jakštas as the "apostle of darkness".

Authors from independent Lithuania recognize Jakštas' contribution to the Lithuanian nation and often compare him to Jonas Basanavičius or Vincas Kudirka.

Several streets in Lithuania are named after Jakštas, including one in Kaunas Old Town (named in 1919, name returned in 1998), street along Nevėžis River in Panevėžys (named in 1934, name returned in 1990), and Jakšto Street in Vilnius (named in 1939 after Lithuania gained Vilnius as a result of the Soviet–Lithuanian Mutual Assistance Treaty).

== Bibliography ==
- Ažubalis, Algirdas (2015). ""Mes ne savo ugnimi žėruojam ir ne sau aplinkui šviesą liejam": Prelatui Adomui Jakštui (Aleksandrui Dambrauskui) – 155" (PDF). Kultūros barai (in Lithuanian). I: 74–81. ISSN 0134-3106.
- Balčius, Jonas (2002). "Adomo Jakšto etinės pažiūros: pikto problema". Logos (in Lithuanian). 31: 6–17. ISSN 0868-7692.
- Balčius, Jonas (2004). "Aleksandras Dambrauskas-Jakštas - etikas". Pedagogika (in Lithuanian). 71: 41–44. ISSN 2029-0551.
- Baltaragis, A. (1960). "A. Jakštas dabarties Lietuvoje". Aidai (in Lithuanian). 9 (134).
- Baltrūnas, Aleksandras (1996). "A. Dambrauskas-Jakštas matematikos populiarintojas" (PDF). Alfa ir omega (in Lithuanian). 2: 43–48.
- Baršys, Povilas (2015). Vasario 16-osios Akto signataras Saliamonas Banaitis. Iš Lietuvos nacionalinio muziejaus archyvo (in Lithuanian). Vol. 13. Vilnius: Lietuvos nacionalinis muziejus. ISBN 978-609-8039-63-4. ISSN 1648-2859.
- Brazaitis, Juozas (1980). "Aleksandras Dambrauskas-Adomas Jakštas" (PDF). Raštai (in Lithuanian). Vol. I. Chicago: Į laisvę fondas lietuviškai kultūrai ugdyt. pp. 308–325. OCLC 9082584.
- Dambrauskas, Leonardas (August–September 1935). "A. Jakštas ir rašomoji kalba". Židinys (in Lithuanian). 8–9: 125–130.
- Dambriūnas, Leonardas (November 1960). "Adomas Jakštas — publicistas". Aidai (in Lithuanian). 9 (134).
- Dovydaitis, Pranas; Biržiška, Vaclovas (1937). "Dambrauskas, Aleksandras". Lietuviškoji enciklopedija (in Lithuanian). Vol. 5. Kaunas: Spaudos fondas. pp. 1397–1402.
- Eidintas, Alfonsas (2015). Antanas Smetona and His Lithuania: From the National Liberation Movement to an Authoritarian Regime (1893–1940). On the Boundary of Two Worlds. Translated by Senn, Alfred Erich. Brill Rodopi. ISBN 9789004302037.
- Grinius, Jonas (1973). Liuima, Antanas (ed.). Veidai ir problemos lietuvių literatūroje (PDF) (in Lithuanian). Vol. I. Rome: Lietuvių katalikų mokslo akademija. OCLC 6154597.
- Jegorovas, Povilas (28 September 2020). "Aleksandras Dambrauskas – Lietuvos esperantininkas Nr. 1" (PDF). Mokslo Lietuva (in Lithuanian). 16 (659): 10. ISSN 1392-7191.
- Kalinauskaitė, Nijolė (2011). "Aleksandro Dambrausko naujosios trigonometrinės sistemos". Lietuvos matematikos rinkinys. Lietuvos matematikų draugijos darbai (in Lithuanian). 52: 156–160. ISSN 0132-2818.
- Katilius, Algimantas (2006). "Kauniečių „Motinėlės" draugija Kaune". Kauno istorijos metraštis (in Lithuanian). 7: 85–102. ISSN 2335-8734.
- Keinys, Stasys (2000). "Iš A. Dambrausko kalbos ir terminologijos veiklos". Terminologija (in Lithuanian). 7: 32–47. ISSN 1392-267X.
- Labanauskas, Ramūnas (2012). Lietuvių katalikų mokslo akademija 1922–2012: Istorinė apžvalga ir bibliografija (PDF) (in Lithuanian). Lietuvių katalikų mokslo akademija. ISBN 978-9986-592-69-3.
- Mačiulis, Dangiras; Nikžentaitis, Alvydas; Safronovas, Vasilijus (2009). "Simbolinis daugiakultūrio miesto užvaldymas: Kauno, Klaipėdos ir Vilniaus atvejai". In Bumblauskas, Alfredas (ed.). Naujasis Vilniaus perskaitymas: didieji Lietuvos istoriniai pasakojimai ir daugiakultūris miesto paveldas (in Lithuanian). Vilnius: Vilniaus universiteto leidykla. pp. 105–129. ISBN 978-9955-33-522-1.
- Mačiūnas, Vincas (March–April 1980). "Jakštas bara Vaižgantą". Aidai. 2.
- Narkevičienė, Danguolė (13 April 2018). "Ideali kalba, idealus pasaulis. Esperanto ir jos kelias Lietuvoje" (in Lithuanian). Lietuvos Nacionalinės Martyno Mažvydo bibliotekos Judaikos tyrimų centras.
- Nyka Niliūnas, Alfonsas (September 1949). "Nepriklausomos Lietuvos poezija: Keturi vėjai ir keturvėjininkai". Aidai (in Lithuanian). 24.
- Pauliukonis, Pranas (November 1960). "Draugija, literatūros, mokslo ir politikos žurnalas". Aidai (in Lithuanian). 9 (134). ISSN 0002-208X.
- Pilkauskas, Donatas (20 December 2021). "A.Jakšto prospektas Panevėžyje". Panevėžio istorijos puslapiai (in Lithuanian). Panevėžio apskrities Gabrielės Petkevičaitės-Bitės viešoji biblioteka.
- Salys, Antanas (1985). Raštai (PDF) (in Lithuanian). Vol. 3. Rome: Lietuvių katalikų mokslo akademija. OCLC 8670038.
- Samulionis, Pranas (1933). "Aleksandras Dambrauskas – mokslininkas" (PDF). Lietuvių katalikų mokslo akademijos suvažiavimo darbai (in Lithuanian). I: 503–518.
- Šilas, Vytautas (12 January 2014). "Zamenhofas ir Kaunas". Mokslo Lietuva (in Lithuanian). ISSN 1392-7191.
- Šimkus, Morkus (13 February 1971). "Prel. Aleksandras Dambrauskas esperantininkas" (PDF). Draugas. Mokslas, menas, literatūra (in Lithuanian). 37 (7): 2, 5–6.
- Šlekys, Jonas (1998). "Eruditas ir poetas". Rinktinė: lyrika, satyros, vertimai ir sekimai, feljetonai. By Jakštas, Adomas (in Lithuanian). Vilnius: Vaga. ISBN 5-415-00418-1.
- Šlekys, Jonas (2001). "Aleksandras Dambrauskas-Adomas Jakštas (1860–1938)". In Girdzijauskas, Juozas (ed.). Lietuvių literatūros istorija: XIX amžius (PDF) (in Lithuanian). Vilnius: Lietuvių literatūros ir tautosakos institutas. pp. 696–703. ISBN 9986513693.
- Šlekys, Jonas; Plečkaitis, Romanas (20 November 2025) [2018]. "Adomas Jakštas". Visuotinė lietuvių enciklopedija (in Lithuanian). Mokslo ir enciklopedijų leidybos centras.
- Šliogeris, Arvydas (1973). "Tomistinės ir V. Solovjovo idėjos A. Dambrausko-Jakšto filosofijoje". Problemos (in Lithuanian). 12: 69–78. doi:10.15388/Problemos.1973.12.5526. ISSN 2424-6158.
- Stonienė, Vanda (1997). "Lietuvių visuomenės ir spaudos veikėjas Adomas Jakštas-Dambrauskas (1860–1938)". Knygotyra (in Lithuanian). 24 (31): 44–54. doi:10.15388/Knygotyra.1997.45. ISSN 0204-2061.
- Sutton, Geoffrey (2008). "Dambrauskas, Aleksandras". Concise Encyclopedia of the Original Literature of Esperanto, 1887–2007. Mondial. ISBN 978-1-59569-090-6.
- Tarailienė, Dalia (2012). "Adomo Jakšto-Dambrausko rankraščiai Lietuvos nacionalinės bibliotekos Retų knygų ir rankraščių skyriaus rinkiniuose". Lietuvių katalikų mokslo akademijos metraštis (in Lithuanian). 36: 199–226. ISSN 1392-0502.
- Tumas, Juozas (1975). "Prelatas Aleksandras Dambrauskas. Minint 70 m. jo amžiaus sukaktį 1860-VIII-27 — 1930" (PDF). Užgesę žiburiai: biografijų ir nekrologų rinkinys. By Dambrauskas–Jakštas, Aleksandras (in Lithuanian). Rome: Lietuvių katalikų mokslo akademija. pp. V–XVI. OCLC 2280519.
- Vaišvila, Alfonsas (1980). Logikos mokslas Lietuvoje (in Lithuanian). Vilnius: Mintis. OCLC 9732147.
- Vaitkus, Mykolas (November 1960). "Su gyvu Jakštu". Aidai (in Lithuanian). 9 (134).
- Vasiliauskienė, Aldona (2009). "LKMA išeivijoje: religijos mokslų sklaida". Soter (in Lithuanian). 32 (60): 175–190. ISSN 1392-7450.
- Žaltauskaitė, Vilma (2014). ""Matyti mane kunigu": katalikų dvasininko karjera: motyvai pasirinkti ir galimybės realizuoti XIX a. antroje pusėje". Lietuvių katalikų mokslo akademijos metraštis (in Lithuanian). 38: 93–107. ISSN 1392-0502.
- Zinkevičius, Zigmas (1992). Lietuvių kalbos istorija (in Lithuanian). Vol. 5: Bendrinės kalbos iškilimas. Vilnius: Mokslo ir enciklopedijų leidykla. OCLC 34077762.
