= Žemaičių ir Lietuvos apžvalga =

Lithuanian-language Catholic newspaper

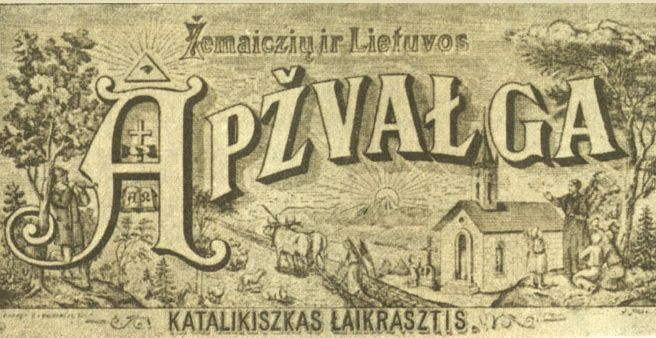
Nameplate of Žemaičių ir Lietuvos apžvalga used from April 1890 to March 1893

Žemaičių ir Lietuvos apžvalga (literally: Samogitian and Lithuanian Review, original spelling: Żemajczių ir Lietuwos Apżwałga), often abbreviated as Apžvalga, was a Lithuanian-language Catholic newspaper published in Tilsit, East Prussia, in 1889–1896. At the time, Lithuanian press was banned and the newspaper had to be smuggled across the Prussia–Russia border. It promoted and supported the Lithuanian National Revival, but above all defended the Catholic faith. While it was fiercely anti-Tsarist publication when it came to religious and cultural topics, it was a socially conservative publication. It was replaced by a relatively more liberal Tėvynės sargas established in 1896.

== History ==
Lithuanian clergy published their own periodical Šviesa in August 1887 – August 1888. When secular Varpas appeared in January 1889, the clergy hastened to establish a Catholic periodical. In fall 1889, students at the Kaunas Priest Seminary decided to establish Apžvalga by copying the example of the Polish Przewodnik Katolicki. The first issue was published in October 1889. It appeared regularly every two weeks from 1890. In its last year, it was a monthly. In total, 154 issues were published. Each issue was 8 pages long. The circulation was about 2,000 copies with more than half of them going to subscribers. Its circulation was about twice that of the monthly Varpas and Ūkininkas. The newspaper was mostly supported by clerics at the Kaunas Priest Seminary and distributed in the Diocese of Samogitia. Clerics at the Sejny Priest Seminary disliked Apžvalga due to its inconsistent and outdated spelling as well as its ideology. Therefore, they were more supportive of Varpas until 1894 when its editor Vincas Kudirka strongly criticized Caritatis, encyclical regarding the Church in Poland issued by Pope Leo XIII. Sejny clerics attempted to improve Apžvalga, but when their mission failed they established Tėvynės sargas in 1896.

== Content ==
Overall, the tone of Apžvalga was rough and combative. Apžvalga considered the Catholic faith to be the cornerstone of the Lithuanian national identity and spent its energy on defending the faith against the various Russification policies. It frequently attacked the Tsarist government – not only the local administration (as other Lithuanian newspapers), but also the central government in Saint Petersburg. Its complaints centered around the anti-Catholic campaigns and promotion of Eastern Orthodoxy. It encouraged readers to actively resist Russian officials (e.g. forcibly remove Russian policemen from churches where they searched for Lithuanian prayer books) and boycott Russian primary schools. It encouraged Kražiai residents to protest the closure of the local church and monastery and fiercely criticized the Kražiai massacre in November 1893. After the death of Tsar Alexander III of Russia, instead of publishing his obituary, Apžvalga published a list of various anti-Catholic and anti-Lithuanian policies adopted during his reign. Priests Kazimieras Pakalniškis and Adomas Jakštas debated the issue of Russian officials visiting local clergy houses: Pakalniškis argued that to keep the police on friendly terms, priests could offer a bottle of vodka or a bribe of a few rubles, while Jakštas argued against such practices.

Apžvalga also criticized Polonized nobility and urged them to return to their Lithuanian roots – most importantly, use the Lithuanian language and not to look down the Lithuanian culture as "inferior". It also encouraged priests to hold masses and deliver sermons in Lithuanian, not Polish, but in general it tried to avoid further cultural tensions between Poles and Lithuanians. Many members of the clergy still supported a Polish–Lithuanian union in the spirit of the old Polish–Lithuanian Commonwealth and the newspaper did not confront the Catholic hierarchy over its preference for the Polish language. The newspaper encouraged Lithuanian priests not only to be diligent in their religious work, but also to educate and spread the ideas of the Lithuanian National Revival among the common village folk. It also promoted teetotalism and temperance not only as beneficial to Lithuanians but also as detrimental to the tax revenues of the Tsarist government. It opposed Lithuanian emigration to United States and encouraged taking up trade or craft to improve one's financial condition. Apžvalga wrote on religious and cultural topics, but not about politics. While it fiercely attacked the Tsarist regime on religious issues, it did not comment on the social order or Tsar's political power. It published a few poems by Maironis, Antanas Baranauskas, Adomas Jakštas, and works of fiction by Kazimieras Pakalniškis.

== Editors and contributors ==
The newspaper was printed in a press owned by Otto von Mauderode in Tilsit (present-day Sovetsk, Kaliningrad Oblast). Because the newspaper was printed in East Prussia, it needed to have official editors who were residents of East Prussia. Its official editors were Enzys Jagomastas (first 18 issues), Mikelis Kiošis (1890, 1892–1895), and priest H. Wischmann from Žibai and Šilgaliai (1891, 1896; Lithuanian spelling of the last name: Vychmanas). The actual editors were Juozas Angrabaitis who worked at the Mauderode's press as a proofreader but had to flee to Kraków (then in Austria-Hungary) to avoid the German police, priest Pranas Urbanavičius who lived near Gargždai next to the Prussia–Russia border, and priest Kazimieras Pakalniškis known by his pen name Dėdė Atanazas.

Almost half of the contributors were not members of the clergy. The contributors included Antanas Baranauskas, Jonas Basanavičius, Adomas Jakštas, Maironis, Juozas Tumas-Vaižgantas, Antanas Milukas. Because the publication was illegal, as contributors used various pen names which makes author identification difficult. In total, Apžvalga had about a third less contributors than Varpas in the same period.
