= Konradas Kaveckas =

Konradas Kaveckas (November 2, 1905 in Tirkšliai, Mažeikiai County - November 8, 1996 in Vilnius) was a Lithuanian organist and choral conductor.

Kaveckas established himself among the most prominent Lithuanian composers prior to German occupation. Under Stalin's rule Kaveckas composed secular choral music publicly, but in secret also religious music.

== Recordings ==
- Susitikt Tave Norėčiau Vėlei (LP) Мелодия С10-08827-8 1977
