= Nedėldienio skaitymas =

Lithuanian-language newspaper (1905–1907)

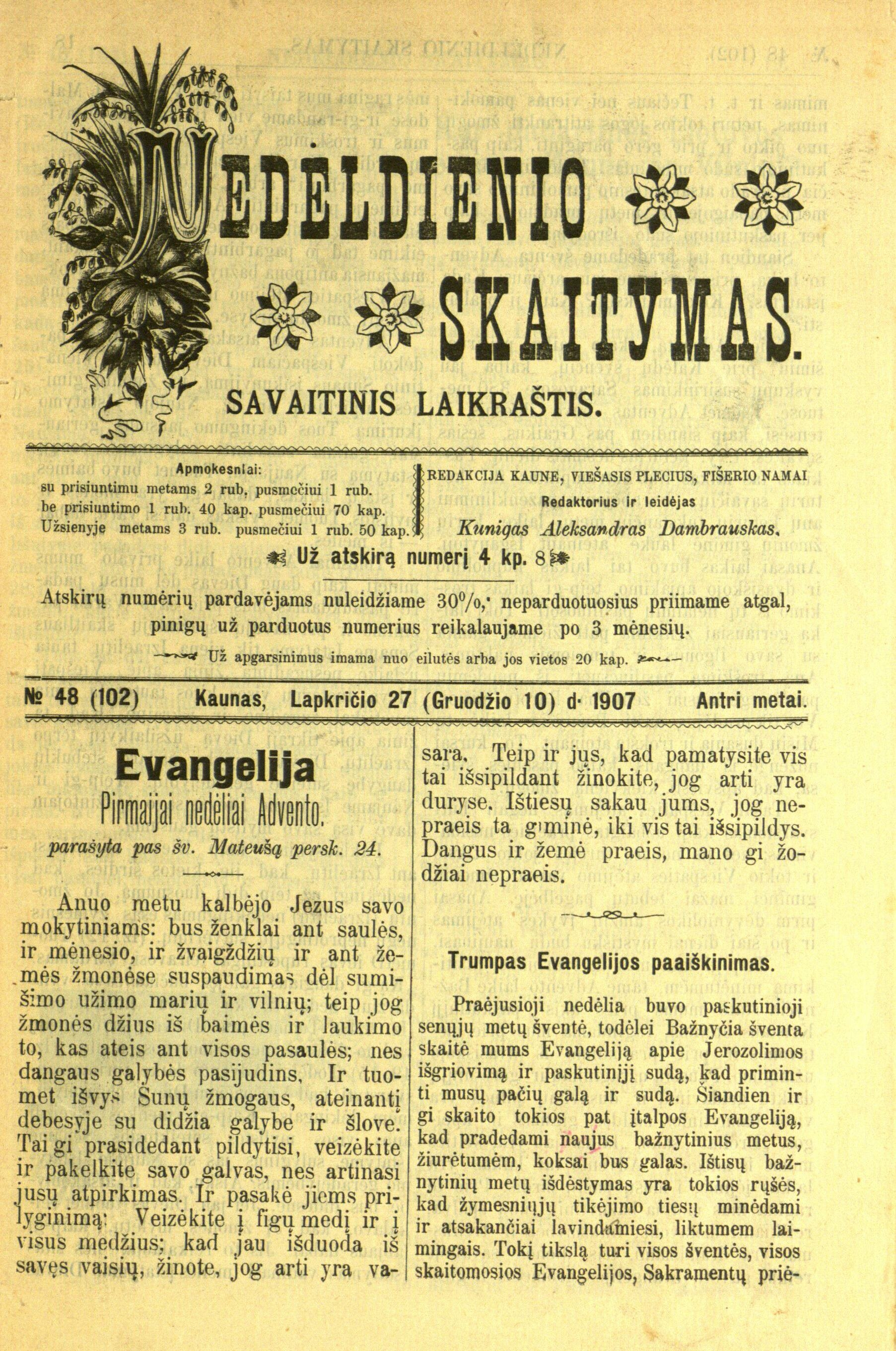
- Front page of 27 November 1907 issue
- Type: Weekly newspaper
- Founder(s): Mečislovas L. Paliulionis, Antanas Karosas
- Editor-in-chief: Antanas Alekna (last)
- Founded: 24 November 1905; 120 years ago
- Ceased publication: 10 December 1907
- Political alignment: Roman Catholicism
- Headquarters: Kaunas, Russian Empire
- Circulation: 3,800 (as of 1907)

Nedėldienio skaitymas (transl. Sunday's Reading or Reading for the Day of Rest) was a weekly Lithuanian-language Catholic newspaper published from 1905 to 1907 in Kaunas (then part of the Russian Empire). It was organ of the Bishop of Samogitia Mečislovas Leonardas Paliulionis. Because it focused on religious texts and avoided more political topics that would reflect the ideas of the Lithuanian National Revival, it did not become popular and was replaced by Vienybė.

== History ==
Antanas Karosas, rector of the Kaunas Priest Seminary, submitted request to publish a Lithuanian newspaper on 23 February 1905. However, the Main Directorate for Press Affairs of the Russian Empire approved the newspaper only on 3 October 1905. The first issue was published on 24 November 1905. It was one of the first legal Lithuanian periodicals after the Lithuanian press ban was lifted in 1904.

The newspaper was an organ of the Bishop of Samogitia Mečislovas Leonardas Paliulionis. Due to its lackluster content, the newspaper did not become popular. It lacked contributors and its content was written mostly by its editor. It was criticized by more active Lithuanian priests who planned to establish two Catholic newspapers – one for the intelligentsia and the other for the common folk – but the bishop frustrated their efforts. Nedėldienio skaitymas was published by the future bishop Antanas Karosas until summer 1906 when it was taken over by the Society of Saint Casimir and its chairman Adomas Dambrauskas-Jakštas. It was printed at the printing presses of Saliamonas Banaitis and Maksimas Sokolovskis.

The circulation was 3,800 copies in 1907. After 102 issues, the newspaper was discontinued on 4 December 1907 when it was replaced by Vienybė (Unity) which was published until 1933.

== Content ==
Nedėldienio skaitymas was a Catholic newspaper that published news from Lithuania and abroad and practical advice about farming. It propagated Catholic ideas as well as encouraged reading and education. In 1906–1907, it published the religious supplement Tiesos žodis (Word of Truth) which published sermons, excerpts from the Bible, and other religious texts.

The newspaper was criticized by Lithuanian activists for the lack of more patriotic or political articles that would reflect ideas of the Lithuanian National Revival. They were also dismayed by the bishop's intent to publish the newspaper using the old orthography which included Polish letters ł, cz, and others. However, the bishop eventually relented and the newspaper was published in the new spelling. According to researcher Regina Laukaitytė, the newspaper clearly illustrated the generational differences between the older Catholic clergy and the younger priests. The older generation reflected the official Tsarist policies and cared only about the religious needs of the congregation, while the younger generation was more politically involved.

Researcher Darius Staliūnas described the newspaper as "probably the most notorious propagator of anti-Semitic sentiments among Lithuanians".

== People ==
The newspaper was edited by:

- Domininkas Tumėnas (1905–1906) – one of the founders and editors of Tėvynės sargas
- Adomas Dambrauskas-Jakštas (1906–1907)
- Antanas Alekna (1907).

Article authors included Jurgis Baltrušaitis, Mečislovas Davainis-Silvestraitis, Kazimieras Pakalniškis.
