= Jūratė and Kastytis (opera) =

Jūratė ir Kastytis is a Lithuanian-language opera by Kazimieras Viktoras Banaitis to a libretto by Bronė Buivydaitė. Written in 1955, it was performed and recorded in Chicago in 1972. Kastytis’ ballad is sometimes performed as a solo aria.

== Recordings ==
Complete recording 1972 Lithuanian Opera Records 3LP Chicago.
