= Kazimieras Viktoras Banaitis =

Lithuanian composer

Kazimieras Viktoras Banaitis (3 May 1886 – 25 December 1963 in Brooklyn) was a Lithuanian composer.

== Selected works ==
- Jūratė ir Kastytis (Jūratė and Kastytis), opera (1955)
- Sonata in D minor
- Idylls of Lithuania
- Rapsodica in B minor, sonata

== Recordings ==
- Sonata rapsodica (34' min.) David Geringas (cello), Petras Geniušas (piano) 2015
