= Motinėlė Society =

Motinėlė Society (motinėlė is a Lithuanian-language diminutive of "mother") was the common name of two Lithuanian charitable societies, one based in United States and the other in Kaunas, Lithuania, that provided financial aid to gifted Catholic minded students. While the societies shared the name and functions, they were independent of each other. The Lithuanian American society was established in 1900 by a group of priests and was active until 1945. Lithuanian priests copied the example and established Motinėlė in Kaunas in 1903. This society was active until 1932. Both societies supported over 120 Lithuanian students, many of whom later became prominent figures in Lithuanian politics, science, culture, and Catholic church.

== Lithuanian American society ==
The idea of a charitable society to support Catholic-minded students was raised by Lithuanian students at the University of Fribourg. They published an appeal in the Chicago newspaper Lietuva. A group of Lithuanian priests, including Antanas Kaupas, Antanas Milukas, Jonas Žilius-Jonila, responded to the appeal and established Motinėlė in Pittston, Pennsylvania. Initially, it had broad goals of supporting Lithuania's independence from the Russian Empire, raising Lithuanian national consciousness, pursuing freedom of the press and religion, and providing financial aid to Lithuanian students and to those who suffered for serving Lithuanian causes. The society had about 200 members (mostly priests) and received most of its income from annual dues that were about $10 (equivalent to $387 in 2025). It was also supported by priests in Lithuania, including the Tėvynės sargas newspaper. The society became virtually inactive in 1926, but was reestablished in 1932. It was disestablished in 1945.

Motinėlė was most active in providing scholarships to Lithuanian university students who studied at various universities of Europe, including the University of Fribourg, Moscow Imperial University, University of Kraków. In 1900–1926, the society distributed $14,000 (equivalent to $255,000 in 2025) in scholarships. In total, it supported 43 students, including composers Stasys Šimkus and Aleksandras Kačanauskas, writers Marija Pečkauskaitė (pen name Šatrijos Ragana) and Vincas Mykolaitis-Putinas, Prime Minister Pranas Dovydaitis, philosopher Stasys Šalkauskis, bishops Vincentas Borisevičius and Jurgis Matulaitis, painters Vytautas Kairiūkštis and Adomas Varnas, priest and poet Motiejus Gustaitis, priest and historian Jonas Totoraitis.

== Kaunas society ==
Initially, due to the various Russification policies, the society in Lithuania was illegal and little is known of its first few years. It is believed that it was established in summer 1903. It was supported by Lithuanian priests, including Adomas Dambrauskas-Jakštas, Jonas Mačiulis-Maironis, Kazimieras Steponas Šaulys, Juozas Tumas-Vaižgantas, Pranciškus Būčys, Jonas Totoraitis. They supported linguist Kazimieras Būga, writers Marija Pečkauskaitė (pen name Šatrijos Ragana) and Józef Albin Herbaczewski.

When it became possible to register Lithuanian societies, seven Lithuanians from Panevėžys, including linguists Jonas Jablonskis and Juozas Balčikonis, submitted an official request to register the Motinėlė Society in August 1906. The Governor of Kaunas officially approved the registration on 27 January 1907. The founding meeting, attended by 34 people, took place on 21 February and elected the first board (chairman Adomas Dambrauskas-Jakštas, treasurer Kazimieras Steponas Šaulys, and secretary Antanas Alekna, later members included Juozapas Skvireckas and Kazimieras Paltarokas). In 1909, the society added a three-member audit committee (first members were Juozapas Skvireckas, Konstantinas Olšauskas, and Pranciškus Turauskas, later members included Jonas Mačiulis-Maironis, Juozas Tumas-Vaižgantas, Vladas Jurgutis). It was inactive during World War I, but was reestablished in April 1918. In 1919, it raised the idea of establishing a special fund for publishing thesis and dissertations of Lithuanian students. The idea was supported by Stasys Šalkauskis, Edvardas Turauskas, and Leonas Bistras, but remained unrealized. The society's activities diminished in 1920s and it was officially liquidated on 8 October 1932 due to inactivity.

The membership dues were set at 10 rubles and later 10 litas (increased to 15 litas in 1925) per month. The society had 94 members in 1909 and 100 members in 1913. Vast majority of them were priests, including Justinas Staugaitis, Jurgis Matulaitis, Pranciškus Karevičius. After the war, more non-clergy members joined the society. In addition to the membership dues, the society collected various other donations and bequests. For example, Bishop Gaspar Felicjan Cyrtowt left 1,000 rubles in his last will, priest Pranciškus Strakšas donated securities worth 10,000 rubles, farmer Povilas Vidugiris donated 3,000 rubles. Some former aid recipients repaid their support so that other students could benefit.

Until 1924, the society supported at least 84 students. The largest sums were paid to linguists Kazimieras Būga and Juozas Balčikonis, diplomat Kazys Bizauskas, and physician Eliziejus Draugelis. Other recipients included politicians Leonas Bistras and Mykolas Krupavičius, bishop Vincentas Borisevičius, professor Pranas Dovydaitis, President Aleksandras Stulginskis, diplomat Eduardas Turauskas, painter Adomas Varnas, sculptor Juozas Zikaras, composer Jonas Bendorius, Minister of the Interior Liudas Noreika, philosopher Stasys Šalkauskis.

== See also ==
- Žiburėlis, Lithuanian scholarship society established in 1893
