= Kazimieras Steponas Šaulys =

Lithuanian Roman Catholic priest and politician

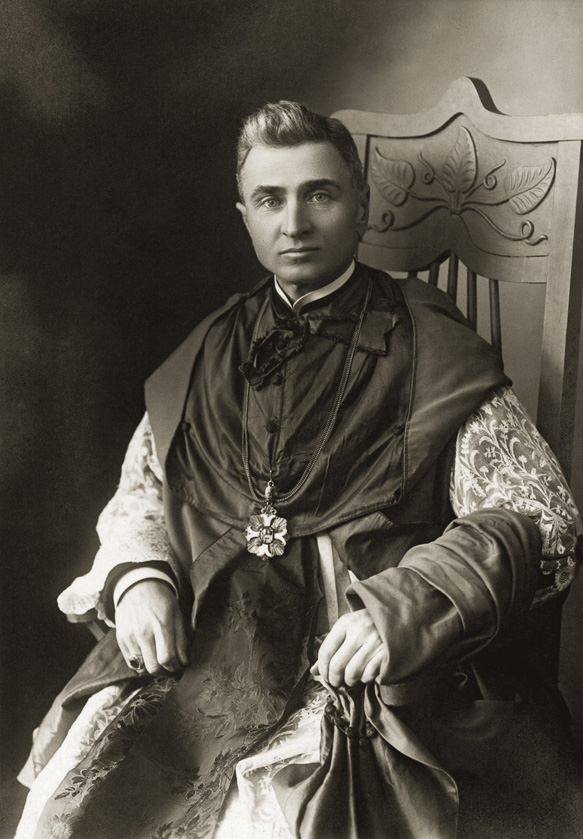
- Born: 28 January 1872; Stemplės, Russian Empire
- Died: 9 May 1964 (aged 92); Lugano, Switzerland
- Education: Saint Petersburg Roman Catholic Theological Academy
- Occupation: Roman Catholic priest
- Employer(s): Diocese of Samogitia; Archdiocese of Kaunas; Kaunas Priest Seminary; Vytautas Magnus University
- Known for: Signatory of the Act of Independence of Lithuania
- Political party: Lithuanian Christian Democratic Party
- Board member of: Motinėlė Society; Saulė Society; Lithuanian Red Cross Society
- Awards: Order of the Lithuanian Grand Duke Gediminas

Kazimieras Steponas Šaulys (Lithuanian pronunciation: [kɐzʲɪˈmʲierɐs ˈstʲæːpɒnɐs ʃauˈlʲîːs]; 28 January 1872 – 9 May 1964) was a Lithuanian Roman Catholic priest and one of the twenty signatories to the Act of Independence of Lithuania.

He graduated from the Kaunas Priest Seminary in 1895 and went on to receive a master's degree from the Roman Catholic Theological Seminary in St. Petersburg in 1899. Šaulys was then appointed as a vicar to Panevėžys, but quickly became the chaplain at the Panevėžys Real School. After the Russian Revolution of 1905, he became involved in various Lithuanian societies, including the Motinėlė Society, Saulė Society, Lithuanian Red Cross Society, and Catholic Charitable Society of Panevėžys.

In 1905, he attended the Great Seimas of Vilnius and subsequently published articles on Christian democracy. In 1917, Vilnius Conference elected him to the 20-member Council of Lithuania which adopted the Act of Independence of Lithuania on 16 February 1918. In 1920, he was elected to the Constituent Assembly of Lithuania as a representative of the Lithuanian Christian Democratic Party. He spoke little during the proceedings, but helped draft the articles dealing with religion and church affairs in the 1922 Constitution of Lithuania. He resigned from the assembly in July 1922, but continued to be involved with the party (he was a member of its central committee until 1934).

He taught at Kaunas Priest Seminary (1906–1922) and then at Vytautas Magnus University (1922–1944) where he specialized in canon law of the Catholic Church. In 1912, Šaulys became secretary of the bishop of Samogitia (first Gasparas Cirtautas and then Pranciškus Karevičius). In 1920, he was promoted to the diocese chancellor. When the Archdiocese of Kaunas was established in 1926, Šaulys became its vicar general. After the Soviet re-occupation of Lithuania in 1944, he moved to Lugano, Switzerland, where he died twenty years later.

== Biography ==
=== Early life and education ===
Šaulys was born on 28 January [O.S. 16 January] 1872 to a family of Lithuanian farmers in Stemplės in the present-day Šilutė District Municipality, then part of the Russian Empire. He had three sisters and one brother. The brother inherited parents' farm but died young leaving eight children as orphans whom Šaulys supported financially. One of his nephews, Kazimieras Alminas, became a linguist. It appears that Jurgis Šaulys, another signatory of the Act of Independence, was not related to Kazimieras Steponas Šaulys though they both were from the same volost. They, however, were close friends and Kazimieras Steponas was a godfather of Jurgis' daughter. This led several contemporaries to believe they were relatives.

Šaulys learned to read in Lithuanian at home, a common practice among the Lithuanians (see: clandestine Lithuanian schools). Despite the Lithuanian press ban, his family owned several Lithuanian books, including works by bishop Motiejus Valančius. In 1882, he enrolled at a Russian primary school in Švėkšna which was about 12 kilometres (7.5 mi) east from his home. He completed it in three years. In August 1887, he enrolled at the newly established four-year Palanga Progymnasium.

In 1891, Šaulys enrolled at the Kaunas Priest Seminary where one of his classmates was Alfonsas Petrulis, another signatory of the Act of Independence. His professors included Kazimieras Jaunius known as a linguist of the Lithuanian language and Jonas Mačiulis better known as poet Maironis. He graduated in 1895 and was sent to study at the Saint Petersburg Roman Catholic Theological Academy. There he was classmate with the future bishops Pranas Būčys (they were also roommates), Jurgis Matulaitis, and Juozapas Kukta. He wrote two thesis – on preacher Girolamo Savonarola in Latin and fables by Ivan Krylov in Russian. He graduated in June 1899 with a master's degree in theology.

=== Priesthood ===
Šaulys was ordained as a priest on 29 June 1899 (Feast of Saints Peter and Paul) by bishop Mečislovas Leonardas Paliulionis at Kaunas Cathedral. He was first assigned as a vicar to the Church of St. Peter and St. Paul, Panevėžys in November 1899. In December 1900, he was reassigned as religion teacher and chaplain to the Panevėžys Real School (present-day Juozas Balčikonis Gymnasium) where he continued to work until August 1906. One of his students was the future linguist Juozas Balčikonis who dedicated the first volume of the Academic Dictionary of Lithuanian to Šaulys. At the same time, he taught religion at three primary schools in the city.

In August 1906, Šaulys was appointed as a professor the Kaunas Priest Seminary where he continued to teach until September 1922. Initially he taught Latin and history of the Catholic Church, and later philosophy, moral theology, and canon law. In 1909, the seminary introduced a new course on sociology and Šaulys published its textbook in 1910 (republished in 1920). At the same time, Šaulys was the seminary's librarian. Apostolic delegate Antonino Zecchini visited the seminary in 1922 and wrote a report lamenting that it became too nationalist and too political, but named Šaulys as an exception as he did not become a nationalist.

=== Activism ===
Šaulys assisted in preparing and editing a Lithuanian calendar published by the Lithuanian and Samogitian Charitable Society for 1905 and 1906. In the latter, he published a lengthy article on Panevėžys. The October Manifesto allowed Lithuanians to organize various societies and Šaulys became an active member of a few of them. He was involved in organizing the Catholic Charitable Society of Panevėžys which maintained a shelter for the poor and the orphaned. For his efforts, he was elected as an honorary member and vice-chairman of the society. Šaulys worked on officially registering the Motinėlė Society in January 1907 and was elected its first treasurer. The society provided scholarships to gifted Lithuanian students. He resigned as board member in 1920, but continued to be involved until its liquidation in 1932. He was also elected the first treasurer of the Saulė Society which organized Lithuanian schools in the Kovno Governorate.

In December 1905, Šaulys participated in the Great Seimas of Vilnius as a representative of the Lithuanian Christian Democratic Party though the party was not officially established until 1917. He published a 16-page brochure on Christian democracy in 1906, a booklet against socialism which he freely translated from a Polish work by Wincenty Miś in 1907, and several articles on the Christian movement stemming from Rerum novarum in Draugija. In August 1907, Šaulys attended social courses in Warsaw. When similar courses were organized in Kaunas in January 1909, he was their secretary.

In 1918, Šaulys assisted in organizing the Lithuanian Red Cross. It was officially established in January 1919 and Šaulys was elected to its board. He continued to be its board member until August 1945 (with a break during the Soviet occupation).

In 1920, Šaulys became a member of the State Archaeological Commission (Valstybinė archeologijos komisija). He was its member for about three years. The commission worked to gather, study, and preserve artefacts from the history of Lithuania.

=== Diocese administration ===
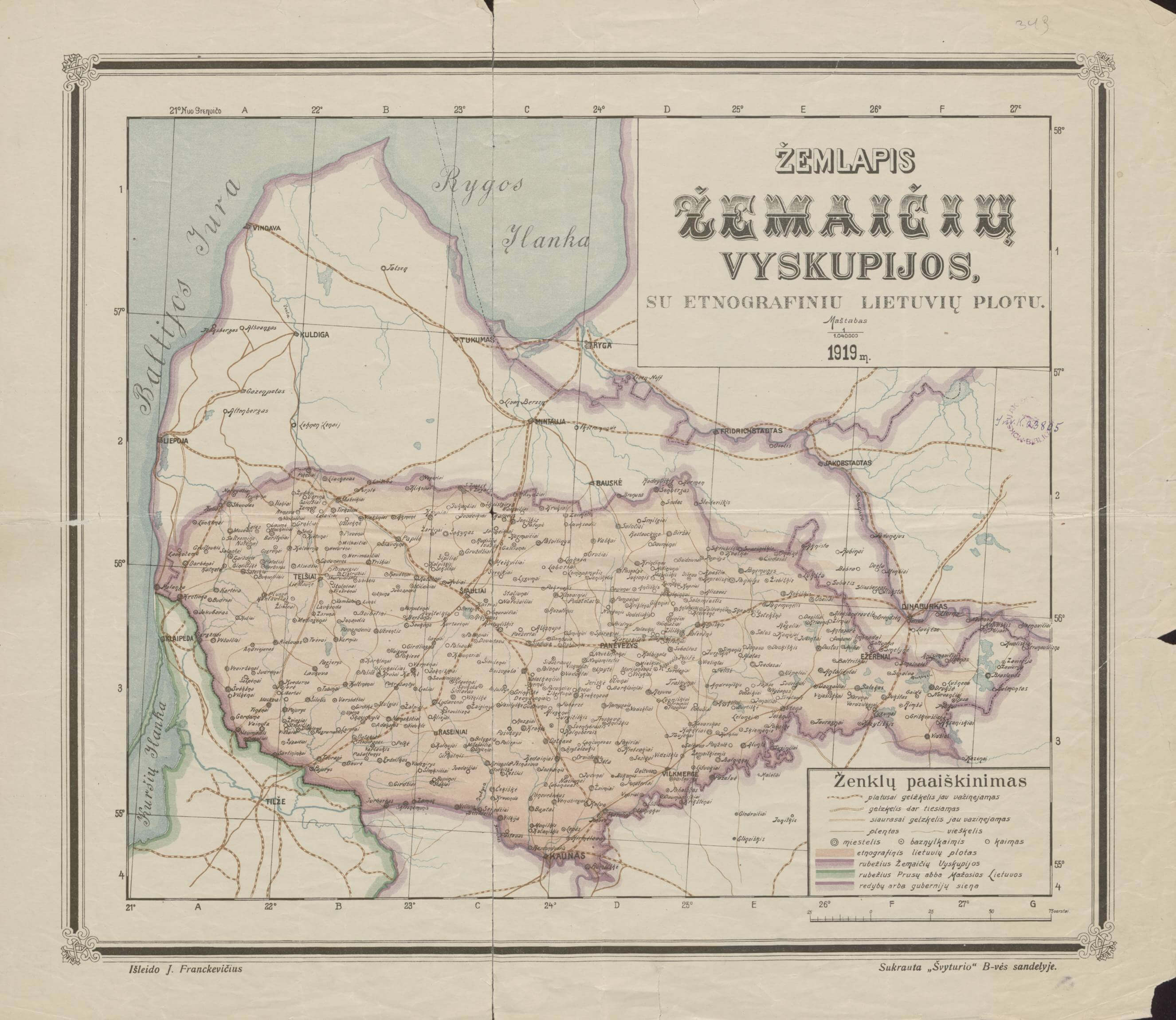
Map of the Diocese of Samogitia in 1919

In November 1906, Šaulys was appointed as defender of marriage to the ecclesiastical court of the Diocese of Samogitia; he continued in this role until March 1919. On 2 January 1912, Šaulys became the secretary of bishop Gasparas Cirtautas and, after his death, of bishop Pranciškus Karevičius. Šaulys wrote that the position was difficult – the diocese was large (over a million Catholics), Tsarist authorities pushed various Russification policies, while Polish and Lithuanian activists feuded over language in church services. Šaulys became honorary canon of the Diocese of Samogitia in December 1914 and true canon in February 1916.

In 1915, due to World War I, commander of Kaunas Fortress general Vladimir Grigoriev moved the Kaunas Priest Seminary to Panevėžys and the cathedral chapter to Smolensk. Šaulys moved to Smolensk in September 1915. Bishop Karevičius, Šaulys, and Kazimieras Paltarokas were able to return to the German-occupied Lithuania via Sweden in August 1916. In 1918, Karevičius requested a suffragan bishop and proposed Šaulys and Juozapas Skvireckas as candidates; the Holy See chose Skvireckas.

In 1920, Šaulys became chancellor of the Samogitian cathedral chapter. In April 1926, the ecclesiastical province of Lithuania was established by the papal bull Lithuanorum Gente. As a result, the Diocese of Samogitia was divided and replaced by the Archdiocese of Kaunas. Skvireckas became the new archbishop and appointed Šaulys as the vicar general. In this role, Šaulys dealt with various issues, including providing support to disabled priests, evaluating the Lithuanian Land Reform of 1922 based on canon law, and opposing civil registration.

In May 1927, Šaulys was granted the honorary title of domestic prelate by Pope Pius XI; later he was elevated to protonotary apostolic. In 1932, after the death of Jonas Mačiulis, Šaulys became prelate of the cathedral chapter of Kaunas and began leading chapter's meetings.

=== Council of Lithuania ===
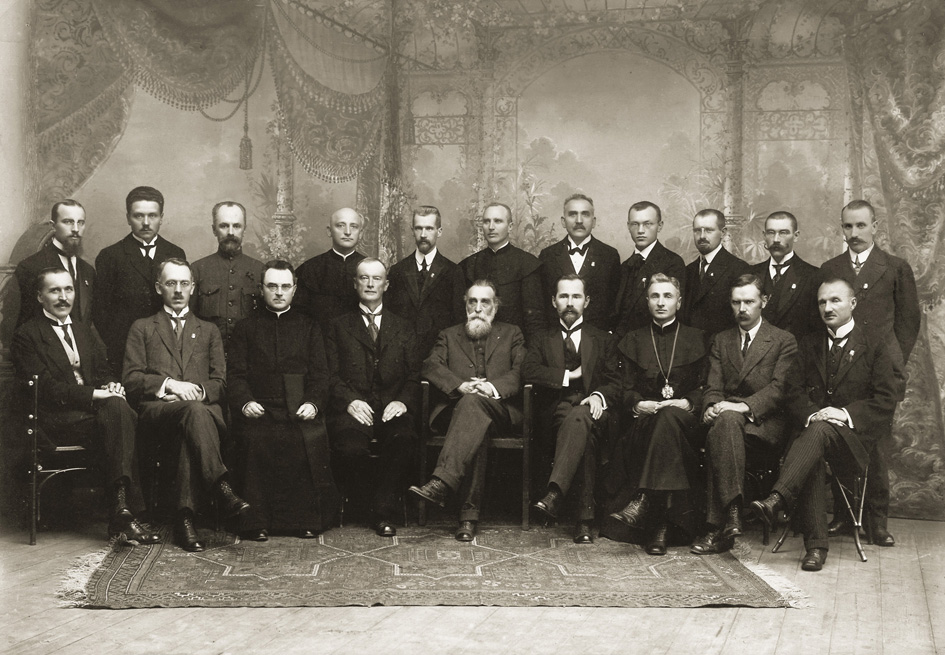
Twenty signatories of the Act of Independence of Lithuania. Šaulys sits third from the right.

As German military advances stalled in 1917, German leadership rethought their strategy for occupied Lithuania. The policy of open annexation was replaced by a more subtle strategy of creating a network of formally independent states under German influence (the so-called Mitteleuropa). To that end, Germans asked Lithuanians to establish an advisory council (Vertrauensrat). Lithuanians convened the Vilnius Conference which elected the 20-member Council of Lithuania. Šaulys was elected to the conference's presidium and to the council (he received 139 votes for, and 64 votes against). Since six priests were elected to the council, Steponas Kairys and other leftist attendees objected to the results. Šaulys was the first who offered to resign, but in the end two other priests resigned.

Šaulys supported the Act of 11 December 1917 which proclaimed the independence of Lithuania but also called for "a firm and permanent alliance" with Germany. He was one of the 12 members who reaffirmed their support on 26 January 1918. As a result, four members of the council left in protest. After heated debates, the four members agreed to return to the council, which adopted the Act of Independence of Lithuania on 16 February 1918. The final act dropped any concessions to Germany and returned to the democratic principles as decided at the Vilnius Conference. The next day, Šaulys presented the act to Friedrich von Falkenhausen, the German civil commissioner who resided in Kaunas, but the Germans refused to accept it. The act had to be smuggled by the journalist Oskar Wöhrle to Matthias Erzberger who published it in the German press.

Šaulys participated in council's proceedings and spoke several times on church issues (the Diocese of Vilnius, Lithuanian language at Sejny and Vilnius Priest Seminaries, exempting churches from paying postage) but overall was not very active. In January 1918, Šaulys became a member of council's committees on church affairs and complaints. In April 1918, Šaulys was tasked with helping Antanas Smetona prepare a constitution of Lithuania, but it is unclear if they produced a draft.

In July 1918, Šaulys expressed support for a democratic republic but voted for inviting Wilhelm Karl, Duke of Urach, as the King of Lithuania and establishing a constitutional monarchy. On 30 October 1918, Šaulys became a member of commission tasked with preparing the First Temporary Constitution which was adopted on 2 November 1918. In February 1919, Šaulys was a member of a committee which attempted to mediate the growing conflict between the Council of Lithuania and the government of Mykolas Sleževičius (see: Second Conference of the State of Lithuania).

=== Constituent Assembly ===
Šaulys helped draft the law on the elections to the Constituent Assembly of Lithuania and was a member of the Central Electoral Commission chaired by Petras Leonas. Bishop Karevičius and Šaulys issued a circular ordering priests to explain the elections to their congregations on the Second Sunday of Easter. Lithuanian bishops also issued a pastoral letter urging Catholics to vote for candidates who supported Catholic values.

Šaulys ran in the April 1920 election as a candidate of the Lithuanian Christian Democratic Party. He was listed second in the Kaunas electoral district and was elected to the Constituent Assembly. He helped draft the 1922 Constitution of Lithuania, specifically the articles related to religion and church affairs, and supported the Lithuanian Land Reform of 1922. However, during the proceedings, Šaulys spoke very little. Historian Zenonas Ivinskis counted only four times when Šaulys spoke during the assembly's sessions. Two of those times were about the impact of the land reform on church's property. Despite that, according to Mykolas Krupavičius, Šaulys held significant influence among the Christian Democrats as they interpreted his vote as bishop's vote and thus according to canon law.

On 25 July 1922, Šaulys resigned form the Constituent Assembly. He explained that he did not have enough time to devote sufficient attention to parliamentary matters. However, he continued to be involved with the Lithuanian Christian Democratic Party and was a member of its central committee from 1922 to 1934.

In March 1926, he became a member of the electoral commission conducting the election to the Third Seimas.

=== University professor ===
The University of Lithuania (since 1930 known as Vytautas Magnus University) was officially opened on 16 February 1922. Catholics debated opening a separate Catholic university, but settled for the Faculty of Theology–Philosophy. Šaulys became one of the five core professors of this faculty. He headed the department of canon law until 1944, with a break between August 1940 and August 1941 when the faculty was closed due to the Soviet occupation. During this break, Šaulys returned to Kaunas Priest Seminary as professor. According to the university statute, professors who reached the age of 65 had to retire, but Šaulys continued to receive exemptions and lecture at the university (he turned 65 in 1937).

He started as a docent, but was quickly promoted to extraordinary professor in June 1922 and to ordinary professor (highest rank) in November 1929. He taught classes on the canon law of the Catholic Church and on the 1917 Code of Canon Law books II and IV (persons and procedures). He had 8–9 hours of lectures per week.

Šaulys was proficient in Lithuanian, Russian, Polish, and Latin. He also knew German, Italian, and French. He amassed a sizeable library, which included books gifted by Madeleine Radziwiłł and bishop Karevičius. It included Codex Babinowski, a collection of copies of various official documents related to the Diocese of Samogitia ordered by bishop Stanisław Kiszka in 1619.

=== World War II ===
During the German occupation, bishop Juozapas Skvireckas mainly lived on his farm in Linkuva just outside of Kaunas, Šaulys became effectively in charge of the archdiocese.

On 4 July 1941, after the German invasion of the Soviet Union, bishops Skvireckas, Vincentas Brizgys, and Šaulys published a letter in the daily Į laisvę expressing joy that the Soviet occupation ended and hopes for a brighter future.

According to memoirs of Brizgys, Skvireckas and Šaulys sent a long protest letter to the German military commandant after the Germans executed Lithuanian policemen who refused to murder Jews in Žagarė. Additionally, according to Brizgys, in another letter they protested the treatment of Jews reminding that many Jews were loyal citizens of Lithuania (likely they asked for protected for several prominent Jews named in the letter). However, these letters were not found in archives or are collaborated by other sources. In March 1942, Šaulys sent letters to priests reminding that adults (e.g. Jews) could be baptized only with bishop's permission and that German orders prohibiting the public to interact with Jews also applied to the clergy.

In November 1941, Germans organized the Mutual Aid Supreme Committee (Savitarpinės pagalbos Vyriausias komitetas) which was the only legal humanitarian aid organization in Lithuania. Šaulys became its vice-chairman and continued in this role until the committee was liquidated. However, he was not very active in the committee. In March 1943, Šaulys participated in organizing the All Lithuanian Conference of 5 April 1943 by which Germans attempted to increase Lithuanian collaboration; however, Šaulys did not attend the conference. In November 1943, he was part of a three-member committee tasked with discussing the mobilization efforts of Lithuanian men into German forces.

=== Exile and death ===
As Red Army pushed towards Lithuania, Šaulys decided to retreat west as he had made a couple of anti-Soviet proclamations, including a newspaper article welcoming German forces in July 1941 and a radio program in December 1943. He left Kaunas on 8 July 1944. He briefly stayed at various monasteries (Brothers Hospitallers of Saint John of God in Vienna, Metten Abbey, women's convent in Munich, Einsiedeln Abbey) before settling at the Casa Santa Birgitta guest house maintained by the Bridgettines in Lugano, Switzerland in December 1945.

In exile, Šaulys continued to correspond on church affairs as many members of the cathedral chapter also fled abroad. He participated in radio programs of Voice of America and Vatican Radio. He supported various Lithuanian efforts, including the Lithuanian Catholic Academy of Science, Lithuanian Swiss Community, and Clergy Relief Society, but old age, increasingly poor health, and financial difficulties prevented him from being more active.

He lived frugally using his savings (he had deposited US$4,000 (equivalent to $96,000 in 2025) in a Swiss bank in 1934), donations for saying masses, and gifts (he received 14,000 Swiss francs from princess Louise Amelie von Vlangali-Handjery who lived in the same guest house). He was visited by various Lithuanian activists, including Joseph Ehret, Stasys Lozoraitis, Mykolas Krupavičius, Vincentas Padolskis, and others. He was close with Jurgis Šaulys who lived in Lugano until his death in 1948; Kazimieras Steponas Šaulys worked on transferring Jurgis' archives to the University of Pennsylvania.

Šaulys died on 9 May 1964. He was buried at the church cemetery of Church of San Pietro in Pambio Noranco, Lugano. In 1968, his remains were moved to Campo Verano in Rome where he was interned in a chapel maintained by the College of St. Casimir.

== Publications ==
Traditional roofed pole dedicated to Šaulys at his birthplace in Stemplės

Šaulys published several books and brochures. He published two brochures on Christian democracy in 1906 and 1907 in which he explained Rerum novarum. At the same time, Šaulys became alarmed about the increasing popularity of socialism and particularly Marxism and lack of Lithuanian materials countering these ideaologies. Therefore, he freely translated a Polish booklet by Wincenty Miś and had it published by the Society of Saint Casimir in 1907. In 1910, Šaulys published the first Lithuanian textbook on sociology. It was republished in 1920 for students at the Vytautas Magnus University.

His most substantial work was 386-page Kanoniškojo proceso teisė (Canon Procedural Law) published in 1927. It was an academic work for which he was promoted to ordinary professor in November 1929.

In addition, Šaulys published articles in various Lithuanian periodicals, including Žemaičių ir Lietuvos apžvalga, Draugija, Nedėldienio skaitymas, Viltis, Tėvynės sargas, Tiesos kelias. He published a lengthy study on Panevėžys (its history, demographics, institutions, education, religion, etc.) in the Lithuanian calendar published by the Lithuanian and Samogitian Charitable Society for 1906. He also published in the Polish press, including Dziennik Wileński and Przegląd Katolicki.

== Legacy ==
In 1994, his 30th death anniversary, a traditional roofed pole was erected at Šaulys' birthplace in Stemplės. The buildings from Šaulys' childhood did not survive. In 2016, his birthplace was added to the Registry of Cultural Property.

In 1997, the Lithuanian Post issued a commemorative stamp by artist Jokūbas Zovė dedicated to Šaulys.

In October 2011, a memorial plaque was affixed to the guest house in Lugano where Šaulys lived in exile. In 2017, a bronze sculpture on granite pedestal by sculptor Arūnas Sakalauskas was erected in the central square of Švėkšna. It measures 5.5 metres (18 ft) in height. In 2019, a plaque with bas-relief of Šaulys by sculptor Vytautas Tallat-Kelpša was installed at the Juozas Balčikonis Gymnasium in Panevėžys.

Historian Algimantas Katilius published a monograph on Šaulys' life in 2016 and a collection of his documents (letters, notes, diary entries, autobiography, etc.) in 2024. Personal archive of Šaulys was preserved by the College of Saint Casimir and transferred to the National Museum of Lithuania in 2012.

== Awards ==
Šaulys received the following awards:

- Order of the Lithuanian Grand Duke Gediminas, 2nd degree (1928)
- Order of the Lithuanian Grand Duke Gediminas, 1st degree (1938)

== Bibliography ==
- Akmenytė-Ruzgienė, Vilma (27 January 2025). "ŠAULYS Kazimieras Steponas (1872–1964)". Atnaujintos 1920–1940 metų Seimo narių biografijos (in Lithuanian). Lietuvos Respublikos Seimo kanceliarija.
- Brizgys, Vincentas (1977). Katalikų bažnyčia Lietuvoje 1940–1944 metais (PDF) (in Lithuanian). Chicago: Draugas. OCLC 3394692.
- Bukaitė, Vilma (2017). "Prelatas Kazimieras Šaulys: politinė biografija" (PDF). Nepriklausomybės sąsiuviniai (in Lithuanian). 2 (20): 3–12. ISSN 2029-9516.
- Čižiūnas, Gintautas (2024). "Iš Žemaitijos kilusių Lietuvos nepriklausomybės Akto signatarų gimtinės ir tėviškės" (PDF). Žemaičių žemė (in Lithuanian). 8 (139): 26–41. ISSN 2783-6436.
- Dapkutė, Daiva (2024). "Ką mums pasakoja prelato Kazimiero Stepono Šaulio egodokumentai". Tautosakos darbai (in Lithuanian). 68: 223–230. ISSN 2783-6827.
- Eidintas, Alfonsas; Žalys, Vytautas; Senn, Alfred Erich (1999). Tuskenis, Edvardas (ed.). Lithuania in European Politics: The Years of the First Republic, 1918-1940 (Paperback ed.). New York: St. Martin's Press. ISBN 0-312-22458-3.
- Grigaravičius, Algirdas (2016). "Signatarų liudijimai". Kultūros barai (in Lithuanian). 1: 75–78. ISSN 0134-3106.
- Ivinskis, Zenonas (February 1952). "Prelatas Kazimieras Šaulys". Aidai (in Lithuanian). 2 (46).
- Jovaiša, Liudas (1998). Žemaičių vyskupijos vizitacija (1579) (in Lithuanian). Vilnius: Aidai.
- Katilius, Algimantas (2016). Prelatas Kazimieras Steponas Šaulys. Iš Lietuvos nacionalinio muziejaus archyvo (in Lithuanian). Vilnius: Lietuvos nacionalinis muziejus. ISBN 978-609-8039-93-1.
- Kubekas, Vilius (2018). "Sugrįžtant prie organiškosios valstybės: apie katalikiškos sociologijos įtaką katalikiškajam korporatyvizmui". Lietuvos istorijos studijos (in Lithuanian). 42: 66–77. ISSN 1648-9101.
- Laukaitytė, Regina (2010). Lietuvos bažnyčios vokiečių okupacijos metais (1941–1944) (in Lithuanian). Vilnius: Lietuvos istorijos instituto leidykla. ISBN 9789955847274.
- Lukšas, Aras (5 February 2016). "Signataras Kazimieras Šaulys: kunigas, politikas, švietėjas". Lietuvos žinios (in Lithuanian).
- Maksimaitis, Mindaugas (2011). Mažoji konstituanta: Lietuvos taryba atkuriant valstybingumą (in Lithuanian). Justitia. ISBN 978-9955-616-65-8.
- Petraitienė, Irena (30 September 2011). "Arkivyskupo Pranciškaus Karevičiaus portreto bruožai" (in Lithuanian). Kauno arkivyskupija.
- "Naujas Švėkšnos miestelio akcentas – skulptūra Nepriklausomybės akto signatarui K.S.Šauliui". Šilutės naujienos (in Lithuanian). 24 June 2017.
- "Kazimieras Steponas Šaulys". Visuotinė lietuvių enciklopedija (in Lithuanian). Mokslo ir enciklopedijų leidybos centras. 14 March 2024 [2018].
