= Pranciškus Karevičius =

Lithuanian Roman Catholic bishop (1861–1945)

- Bishop of Samogitia
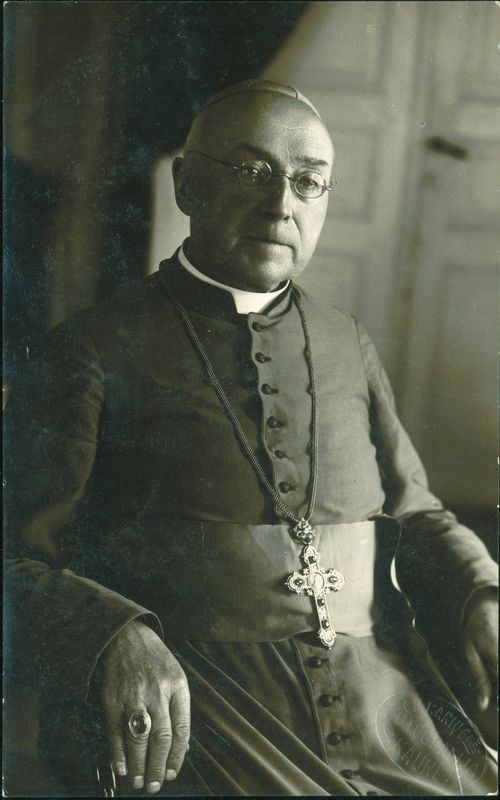
- Installed: 27 February 1914
- Term ended: 22 February 1926
- Predecessor: Gasparas Cirtautas

Orders
- Ordination: 17 May 1886
- Consecration: 17 May 1914 by Wincenty Kluczyński

Personal details
- Born: 30 September 1861 Giršinai, Russian Empire
- Died: 30 May 1945 (aged 83) Marijampolė, Generalbezirk Litauen
- Buried: Kaunas Cathedral
- Denomination: Roman Catholic Church
- Education: Saint Petersburg Roman Catholic Theological Academy

Pranciškus Karevičius (Polish: Franciszek Karewicz; 30 September 1861 – 30 May 1945) was a Roman Catholic bishop of Samogitia from 1914 to 1926.

Educated at the Saint Petersburg Roman Catholic Theological Academy, Karevičius was ordained as a priest in 1886. He taught at the Saint Petersburg Priest Seminary, was parson of the Church of St. Catherine, and became cannon of the cathedral chapter of the Archdiocese of Mohilev in 1910. In February 1914, he was selected as the bishop of Samogitia. He was a Lithuanian patriot and supported the use of the Lithuanian language in church administration and services, thus angering pro-Polish activists. He was called to explain himself to Vatican and the situation was personally investigated by the apostolic visitor Ambrogio Ratti (future Pope Pius XI).

Karevičius was the most politically engaged Lithuanian bishop. He supported the Council of Lithuania, Lithuanian Army, and in February 1918 visited high-ranking German officials asking them to recognize Lithuania's independence. Karevičius frequently visited parishes and his visits became manifestations of Lithuanian patriotism leading to mass rural participation in various Catholic societies (e.g. Pavasarininkai). During his tenure, the diocese established 39 new churches.

The Diocese of Samogitia was dissolved and replaced by the Archdiocese of Kaunas in April 1926. Karevičius resigned as bishop, was appointed as Titular Archbishop of Scythopolis, and joined the Congregation of Marian Fathers of the Immaculate Conception in Marijampolė. Karevičius died in 1945 and was buried in a crypt of Kaunas Cathedral. His memoirs were published in 2006.

== Biography ==
=== Early life and education ===
Karevičius was born on 30 September 1861 in Giršinai near Mosėdis in present-day northern Lithuania to family of Lithuanian farmers. His father had attended Varniai Priest Seminary but was not ordained. Karevičius was the only son in the family; he had three sisters. The children grew up reading books by bishop Motiejus Valančius and other banned Lithuanian publications.

He attended an elementary school in Mosėdis and middle school in Paurupė (Rucava in present-day Latvia). In 1880, he enrolled into the 6th grade at the gymnasium in Liepāja. He was interested in missionary work among "pagans". His mother's uncle, a military chaplain in Warsaw, advised Karevičius that Russia had plenty of neglected Catholics who needed pastoral services and suggested to study at the Saint Petersburg Priest Seminary. Karevičius enrolled at the seminary in February 1881, but a year later he transferred to the Saint Petersburg Roman Catholic Theological Academy. He graduated with a master's degree in theology and was ordained as a priest on 17 May 1886.

=== Early career ===
He was assigned to teaching Catholic moral theology and liturgy at the Priest Seminary in Saint Petersburg. In 1888, he was assigned to Samara where he worked mainly with German Catholics. He established a parish and built three chapels (two for Germans and one for Lithuanians).

In 1892, he returned to Saint Petersburg where became a deputy parson of the Church of St. Catherine and chaplain at a girls' gymnasium. That same year, he instituted Lithuanian-language services at the church. The following year, he started teaching at the priest seminary and was its inspector until 1899. He was the spiritual leader of the seminary in 1903–1910. He taught pastoral theology and civil law. In 1908, he became parson of the Church of St. Catherine.

Mogilev archbishop Jerzy Józef Szembek recognized Karevičius as honorary cannon, while archbishop Wincenty Kluczyński promoted him to cannon of the cathedral chapter in 1910. He served as an assessor of the consistory of the Archdiocese of Mohilev from 1909 to 1913.

Karevičius supported Lithuanian societies, including the Lithuanian and Samogitian Charitable Society and the Lithuanian Scientific Society (he became its member in July 1911). He also supported clandestine women's monasteries in Saint Petersburg (driven underground by Tsarist persecutions) and served as their confessor.

=== Bishop ===
==== Appointment ====
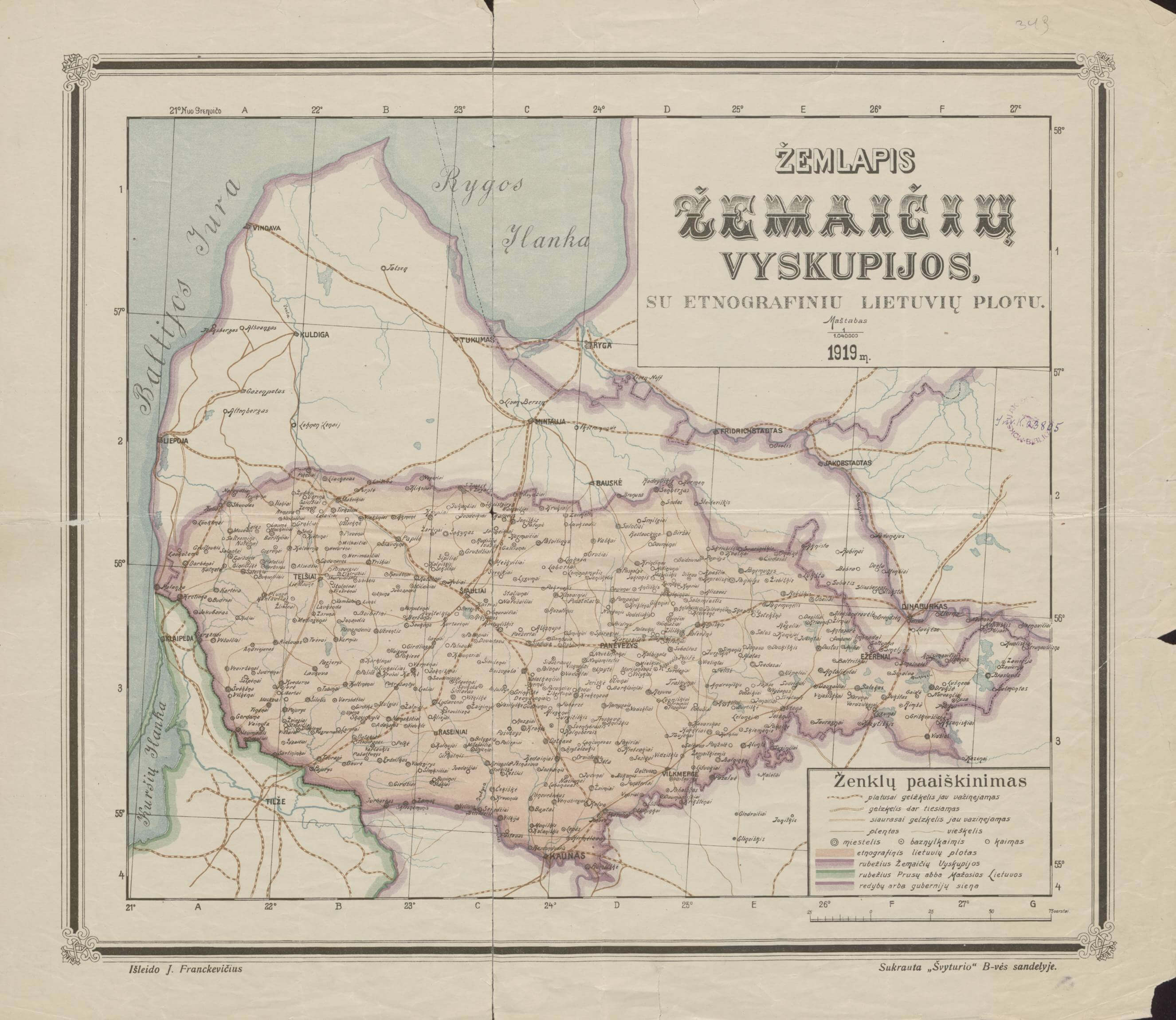
Map of the Diocese of Samogitia in 1919

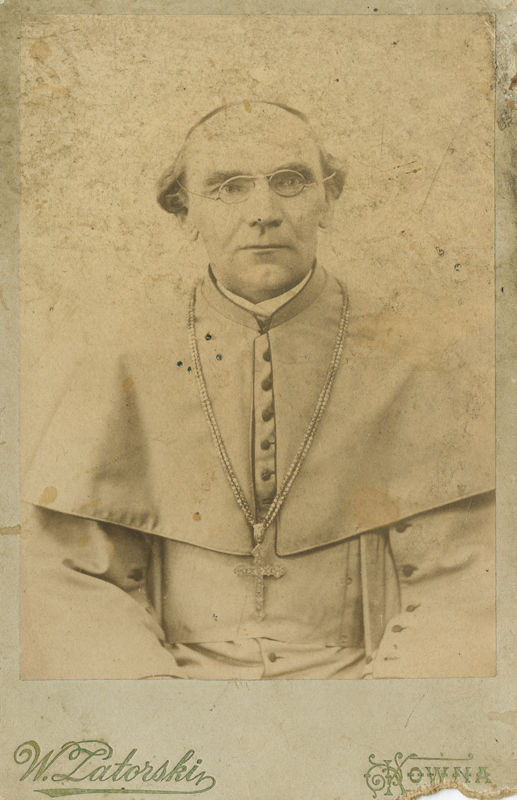
Karevičius in 1914

Bishop Gasparas Cirtautas died on 4 September 1913. He wanted to see Juozapas Skvireckas as his successor. Lithuanian activists proposed Maironis, Kazimieras Prapuolenis, and Konstantinas Olšauskas but they were not acceptable to the Holy See. According to the 1847 Agreement between the Holy See and Russia, bishops were to be appointed by mutual agreement between the Vatican and the Tsar. Eventually, it was agreed on Karevičius who was selected as bishop of Samogitia on 27 February 1914.

Karevičius was consecrated as bishop on 17 May 1914 at the Church of St. Catherine in Saint Petersburg by archbishop Wincenty Kluczyński with assistance from Antanas Karosas and Jan Cieplak. He was installed at Kaunas Cathedral on 31 May 1914. At the time, the diocese had about 1.2 million Roman Catholics in 431 parishes.

==== First years ====
From the beginning, Karevičius was known as a Lithuanian patriot and supporter the use of the Lithuanian language. However, his Lithuanian language skills were poor. For three months, he took daily syntax and grammar lessons from priest Juozas Laukaitis. He also took lessons from organist Česlovas Sasnauskas to improve his Lithuanian pronunciation as his speech was heavily influenced by the Samogitian dialect. However, his speech remained Samogitian eliciting complaints that his sermons were difficult to understand. He delivered his first sermon in Lithuanian praising the efforts of Konstantinas Olšauskas and Saulė Society to provide Lithuanian primary education. This angered local Polish nobles who boycotted the celebratory dinner in his honor.

Karevičius promoted Juozapas Skvireckas and Adomas Jakštas to prelates, Povilas Januševičius and Konstantinas Olšauskas became canons, and Maironis became an official of the consistory. Kazimieras Paltarokas was promoted to vice-rector of Kaunas Priest Seminary. Such influx of Lithuanian priests elicited complains from other members of the cathedral chapter and the Polish-speaking population. The complaints reached the Holy See and Karevičius was asked to visit Vatican to explain himself. At the same time, he obtained permission to provide services in Belarusian to the congregation in the Braslaw district. On this trip, Karevičius was caught by the outbreak of World War I in Germany. He traveled to London, Geneva, Rome (where he attended the funeral of Pope Pius X), Constantinople, Odesa, Kyiv and finally Kaunas.

Due to the war, commander of Kaunas Fortress general Vladimir Grigoriev moved the Kaunas Priest Seminary to Panevėžys and the cathedral chapter to Smolensk. Karevičius first moved to Panevėžys, but his health deteriorated and he traveled to Kislovodsk in Caucasus to recuperate. He then moved to Smolensk in September 1915. By mid-1915, Germans occupied Lithuania and Karevičius was once again cut off from his diocese. Together with Kazimieras Steponas Šaulys and Kazimieras Paltarokas, he was able to return via Sweden. He arrived to Kaunas in August 1916.

Due to unknown reasons, Karevičius did not respond to repeated messages from Lithuanian activists in Switzerland organizing the Lithuanian Day, a worldwide fundraising effort for the benefit of Lithuanian war refugees that was approved by Pope Benedict XV. Therefore, the activists issued the appeal in his name without his consent. In June 1917 (already after the Lithuanian Day), Karevičius sent a protest letter and demanded to distribute a new appeal written by him; Swiss Lithuanians believed that he was coerced into sending this letter by German authorities and ignored his demand. Nevertheless, some of the donations, particularly from Germany and Austria-Hungary, were sent directly to Karevičius and not the Lithuanian committee in Switzerland.

==== Support for Lithuanian government ====
Caricature of the Constituent Assembly of Lithuania: bishop Karevičius sits above the dance floor and plays the pipe to the elected representatives

Karevičius was the most politically engaged Lithuanian bishop. When visiting parishes, he agitated for Lithuania's independence.

As German military advances stalled in 1917, German leadership envisioned a network of formally independent states under German influence (the so-called Mitteleuropa). To that end, Germans asked Lithuanians to establish an advisory council (Vertrauensrat). The Germans invited Karevičius personally to this advisory council, but Lithuanians decided to convene Vilnius Conference which elected the 20-member Council of Lithuania. One of the elected members was Karevičius' chancellor Kazimieras Steponas Šaulys. In December 1917, Karevičius offered a loan of 50,000 German marks to finance the council's activities.

In early February 1918, Karevičius received an invitation from the German–Lithuanian Society (Deutsch-Litauische Gesellschaft) and Matthias Erzberger to visit Berlin to discuss Lithuania's independence. After coordinating with the Council of Lithuania, Karevičius and Konstantinas Olšauskas met with chancellor Georg von Hertling, generals Paul von Hindenburg and Erich Ludendorff on 9 and 11 February 1918, just before the signing of the Act of Independence of Lithuania on 16 February. In addition to political matters, Karevičius discussed excesses of the Imperial German Army in occupied Lithuania.

In December 1918, Karevičius provided assistance to Vincas Grigaliūnas-Glovackis who organized the 2nd Infantry Regiment in Kaunas. In February 1919, Karevičius ordered all priests to hold masses commemorating the anniversary of the Act of Independence of Lithuania. Karevičius conducted oath ceremonies of the first units of the Lithuanian Army, attended the Second Conference of the State of Lithuania, blessed the War School of Kaunas, conducted swearing-in of the first president of Lithuania Antanas Smetona, participated in the opening of the Constituent Assembly of Lithuania, and other state functions. He participated in meetings of the Lithuanian Christian Democratic Party and supported the 1922 land reform in Lithuania. He was later elected honorary members of the Lithuanian Army Creators' and Volunteers' Union (Lietuvos kariuomenės kūrėjų savanorių sąjunga).

In 1928, Karevičius was awarded the Order of the Lithuanian Grand Duke Gediminas.

==== Relations with the Holy See ====
Bishop of Samogitia was also an administrator of the Catholic parishes in Courland. Around 1917, Karevičius proposed to the Holy See that Courland should have its own bishop and offered Eduards Stukelis as a candidate. Due to instability during wartime, the plan was not adopted. Courland was transferred to the Archdiocese of Riga in June 1920.

In late 1918, Karevičius traveled to Rome for an ad limina visit. At the same time, he proposed three candidates for an auxiliary bishop of Samogitia – Juozas Skvireckas (though Karevičius personally disliked him), Kazimieras Steponas Šaulys, and Kazimieras Paltarokas. The Holy See chose Skvireckas on 10 March 1919.

In January 1920, apostolic visitor Ambrogio Ratti (future Pope Pius XI) and his secretary Ermenegildo Pellegrinetti visited Kaunas. Ratti came to investigate Polish complaints that Karevičius discriminated against Poles and, according to rumors, was ready to suspend him. Their conversation was contentious. Karevičius accused Ratti of supporting the eviction of bishop Antanas Karosas from Sejny after the anti-Lithuanian Sejny Uprising (according to memoirs of Mykolas Vaitkus, Lithuanian intelligence under Mikalojus Lipčius intercepted a letter from Ratti to the Polish military command agreeing to Karosas' eviction). The matter of Polish complaints against Karevičius was dropped. Ratti visited Karevičius again in March 1920, but it was a brief private visit on his way to Riga.

In December 1919, Karevičius conducted a canonical visitation of the Convent of the Benedictine Sisters in Kaunas and found that it was highly pro-Polish (for example, Lithuanian nuns were forbidden to speak or read in Lithuanian). He dismissed the mother superior and chaplain starting nearly a five-year conflict between Lithuania, Poland, and the Holy See. The monastery was personally visited by Ambrogio Ratti (future Pope Pius XI) and Antonino Zecchini, and it was placed under the direct jurisdiction of the Holy See in June 1920. Eventually, in February 1924, the Polish nuns moved to Kolainiai where they could not admit any new members.

In January 1922, apostolic visitor Antonino Zecchini arrived to Kaunas and lived with Karevičius for eight days. Due to limited space, Zecchini moved to Aukštoji Panemunė to live with Justinas Staugaitis.

==== Pastoral work ====
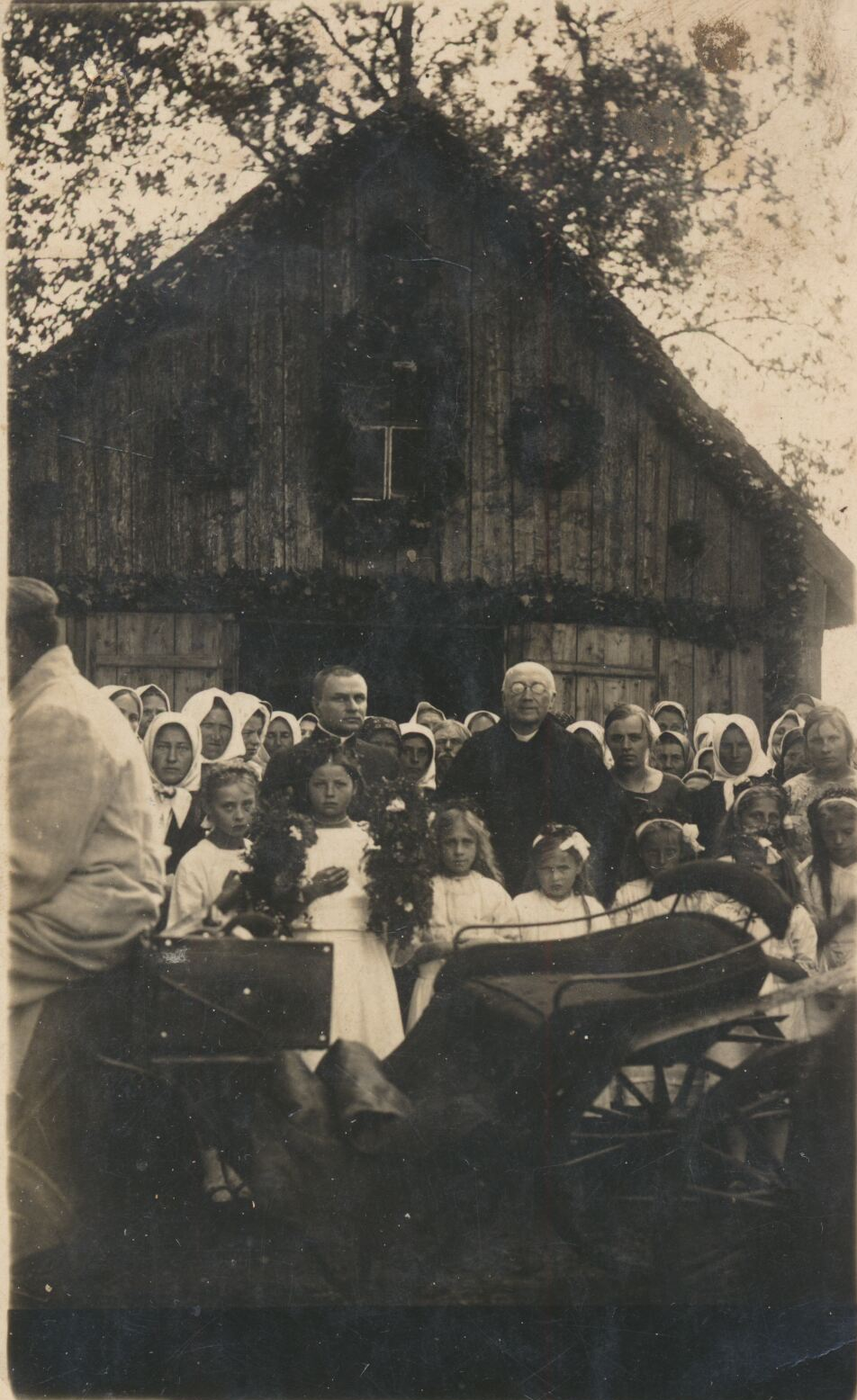
Karevičius visiting the old church in Dabužiai I in September 1925

Karevičius visited up to 90 parishes per year and administered the Sacrament of Confirmation to about half a million believers. He demanded that parish priests organized and led local chapters of various Catholic societies (e.g. Pavasarininkai) and ordered each parish to organize a parish committee. Karevičius liked grand ceremonies and his visitations became manifestations of Lithuanian patriotism. They started the mass participation of rural residents in various Catholic organizations and laid the groundwork for the electoral strength of the Lithuanian Christian Democratic Party.

During his tenure, the diocese established 39 new churches. Karevičius worked to improve education and promote teetotalism. During his tenure, Lithuanian language became established in church administration, parishes, and monasteries.

He supported standardization of religious texts, particularly of hymns and catechism. Lithuanian prayers were full of loan words and barbarisms. Therefore, in 1909, priests Adomas Jakštas, Juozas Laukaitis, and Alfonsas Petrulis formed a committee to review and revise the Lord's Prayer and other Christian prayers. Karevičius was the first bishop to adopt the much improved prayers in 1916. Further language revisions were made in 1922. He also supported the efforts of Juozapas Skvireckas to publish the first full Catholic Bible translation into Lithuanian (published in seven volumes in 1911–1937).

In 1922, Karevičius and others debated the feasibility of a Catholic university in Kaunas. It was decided to establish the Faculty of Theology and Philosophy at University of Lithuania. Karevičius was the chancellor of this faculty until his resignation as bishop. Additionally, the Lithuanian Catholic Academy of Science was established in October 1922.

=== Later life ===
In late 1925, the pope sent Jurgis Matulaitis-Matulevičius as an apostolic visitor to negotiate and draft plans for the Lithuanian ecclesiastical province. The papal bull Lithuanorum Gente issued on 4 April 1926 dissolved the historic Diocese of Samogitia and established the Archdiocese of Kaunas with four dioceses. Karevičius, aged 65, was not selected for the new dioceses. According to notes by Matulaitis-Matulevičius, Karevičius lacked wisdom and discretion and thus was entirely not suitable for the role of a bishop. His contemporaries described Karevičius as impulsive, honest and straightforward, and highly patriotic.

On 22 February 1926, Karevičius was convinced to resign as bishop paving the way for his deputy Juozapas Skvireckas to become the new archbishop of Kaunas. On 23 March 1926, Karevičius was promoted to Titular Archbishop of Scythopolis. He joined the Congregation of Marian Fathers of the Immaculate Conception and entered their monastery in Marijampolė. He took his first vows on 9 July 1926, and his perpetual vows on 14 August 1929 (he was exempted from novitiate).

Karevičius continued to care about Lithuanian church affairs. He frequently corresponded with Adomas Jakštas regarding the publications of the Society of Saint Casimir offering suggestions, criticism, language corrections, etc.

Karevičius, a member of the Franciscan Tertiaries since youth, wanted to invite German Franciscans to Lithuania. When the plans failed, he encouraged his niece Ona Galdikaitė to start the Franciscan Congregation of the Divine Heart of Jesus in Padvariai near Kretinga. Karevičius also supported the Sisters of the Immaculate Conception of the Blessed Virgin Mary and held weekly spiritual conferences with them. However, he did not support the Sisters of Saint Elizabeth when they first arrived to Lithuania in 1924.

In late 1920s, the Holy See tasked papal nuncio Riccardo Bartoloni with organizing a Catholic mission among the Russians living in Lithuania. Bartoloni enlisted Karevičius, Pranciškus Būčys, and Vladas Mažonas. Karevičius was asked to learn the Greek Rite and sent to study with bishop Dionisije Njaradi of the Greek Catholic Eparchy of Križevci in November 1929. However, Karevičius was reluctant to take up the mission, his superior at the Marian Fathers monastery forbade him from holding masses in the Greek Rite in Marijampolė, and the Lithuanian government withdrew its support for the mission.

In November 1941, during the German occupation of Lithuania, Karevičius along with other religious leaders became a member of the Honorary Committee of Mutual Aid (Savitarpinės pagalbos Garbės komitetas). It appears that it was an honorary position without major influence on the Mutual Aid Committee which was the only legal humanitarian aid organization in Lithuania.

Karevičius died on 30 May 1945 and was buried in a crypt of Kaunas Cathedral.

== Publications ==
Karevičius published articles in various Lithuanian periodicals, including Šaltinis, Draugija, Vadovas, Tiesos kelias, Sargyba, Lietuvis.

In 1930s, Karevičius wrote his memoirs. The original manuscript is believed to be lost, but two copies were made in 1930s. These memoirs were published by the Lithuanian Catholic Academy of Science in 2006. The published memoirs end around 1922, thus do not provide insight into his resignation as bishop.

== Bibliography ==
- "Samogitiensis et Rigensis: De finium dioecesanorum commutatione" (PDF). Acta Apostolicae Sedis (in Latin). 12: 270–271. 1920.
- Aliulis, Vaclovas (1 December 2025) [2018]. "Pranciškus Karevičius". Visuotinė lietuvių enciklopedija (in Lithuanian). Mokslo ir enciklopedijų leidybos centras.
- Čepėnas, Pranas, ed. (1972). Lietuvos Universitetas 1579–1803–1922 (in Lithuanian). Chicago: The Association of Lithuanian-American Professors. OCLC 2152067.
- Eidintas, Alfonsas; Žalys, Vytautas; Senn, Alfred Erich (1999). Tuskenis, Edvardas (ed.). Lithuania in European Politics: The Years of the First Republic, 1918-1940 (Paperback ed.). New York: St. Martin's Press. ISBN 0-312-22458-3.
- Eidintas, Alfonsas; Lopata, Raimundas (2020). Valstybės atkūrimo istorijos (in Lithuanian). Mokslo ir enciklopedijų leidybos centras. ISBN 9785420018262.
- Gimžauskas, Edmundas (2013). "Pirmasis pasaulinis – didysis "tautų vadavimo" karas. Ką jis reiškė Lietuvai?". In Laurinavičius, Česlovas (ed.). Lietuvos istorija (in Lithuanian). Vol. X, part I. Baltos lankos. ISBN 978-9955-23-745-7.
- Grickevičius, Artūras; Vasiliauskaitė, Aušra (2009). "Kauno seserų benediktinių vienuolyno pertvarka 1918–1926 m. (I)" (PDF). Soter (in Lithuanian). 29 (57): 69–84. ISSN 2335-8785.
- Grigaravičiūtė, Sandra (2022). "Pirmasis Lietuvos nepriklausomybės pripažinimo prašymas 1918 m. vasario 8-9 d.: tekstas ir kontekstas". Lituanistica (in Lithuanian). 2: 87–121. ISSN 2424-4716.
- Katilius, Algimantas (1994). "Paskutiniojo Žemaičių vyskupo Pranciškaus Karevičiaus atsiminimų fragmentas" (PDF). Lietuvių atgimimo istorijos studijos (in Lithuanian). 7: 452–487. ISSN 1392-0391.
- Laukaitytė, Regina (1997). Lietuvos vienuolijos: XX a. istorijos bruožai (in Lithuanian). Lietuvos istorijos institutas. ISBN 9986-780-09-8.
- Laukaitytė, Regina (2006). "Lietuvos bažnyčių humanitarinė pagalba 1941–1944 m." Lietuvių katalikų mokslo akademijos metraštis (in Lithuanian). 29: 43–55. ISSN 1392-0502.
- Laukaitytė, Regina (2012). "Rytų apeigų vyskupo Petro Būčio misija Lietuvoje (1930–1940)" (PDF). Istorija (in Lithuanian). 84: 26–37. ISSN 1392-0456. The article was adapted and translated to English: Laukaitytė, Regina (March 2016). "Greek Rite Catholicism in Lithuania: The Mission of Bishop Petras Būčys, 1930–1940". Occasional Papers on Religion in Eastern Europe. 36 (2). ISSN 1069-4781.
- Liulevičius, Vincentas (1981). Išeivijos vaidmuo nepriklausomos Lietuvos atkūrimo darbe (in Lithuanian). Chicago: Lithuanian World Community. OCLC 10779045.
- Maksimaitis, Mindaugas (2011). Mažoji konstituanta: Lietuvos taryba atkuriant valstybingumą (in Lithuanian). Justitia. ISBN 978-9955-616-65-8.
- Matulaitis, Kazimieras (1969). "Arkivyskupas Pranciškus Karevičius, jo asmens ir veiklos bruožai" (PDF). LKMA suvažiavimo darbai (in Lithuanian). VI: 277–297.
- Matulis, Steponas (1957). "Arkivyskupas Pranciškus Karevičius, M.I.C." (PDF). LKMA suvažiavimo darbai (in Lithuanian). IV: 240–243.
- Merkelis, Aleksandras (29 May 1936). "Ark. Pr. Karevičiaus santykiai su vokiečių okupacine valdžia". Lietuvos aidas (in Lithuanian). Vol. 245, no. 2861. p. 4.
- Petraitienė, Irena (30 September 2011). "Arkivyskupo Pranciškaus Karevičiaus portreto bruožai" (in Lithuanian). Kauno arkivyskupija.
- Petraitienė, Irena (20 December 2012). "Pal. Jurgio Matulaičio konsekratorius – arkivyskupas P. Karevičius". Bernardinai.lt (in Lithuanian).
- Petraitienė, Irena (28 October 2021). "Pranciškus Karevičius-Karys – paskutinis Žemaičių vyskupas". Bernardinai.lt (in Lithuanian).
- Prašmantaitė, Aldona (2006). "Arkivyskupas Pranciškus Karevičius. Mano gyvenimo ir atsiminimų bruožai". Lietuvos istorijos metraštis (in Lithuanian). 2: 187–192. ISSN 2538-6549.
- Pukienė, Vida (2012). "Arkivyskupas Pranciškus Karevičius: teisybės ieškotojas". Soter (in Lithuanian). 44 (72): 41–55. ISSN 2335-8785.
- Skirius, Juozas (1994). "Bažnytinės lietuvių dienos svarba Lietuvai (1916–1918)". Lietuvių Atgimimo istorijos studijos (in Lithuanian). 7. ISSN 1392-0391.
- Vaišnora, Juozas (1982). Šv. Sosto atstovo Ratti vizitas Lietuvoje ir Latvijoje (in Lithuanian). Brooklyn, NY: Tėvai Pranciškonai. OCLC 13610700.
- Vaitkus, Mykolas (1960). Keturi ganytojai: atsiminimai (in Lithuanian). Chicago: Lietuviškos knygos klubas.
- "Sankt Peterburgo lietuviai". Visuotinė lietuvių enciklopedija (in Lithuanian). Mokslo ir enciklopedijų leidybos centras. 30 October 2025 [2018].
- Zajančkauskas, Konstantinas (1936). Arkivyskupas Pranciškus Karevičius, MIC (in Lithuanian). Marijampolė: Marijonų spaustuvė.
- Zemlickas, Gediminas (24 February – 8 March 2000). "Poteriai ir žegnonė - kaip istorijos ir kultūros paminklas". Mokslo Lietuva (in Lithuanian). 4 (206).
- Zinkevičius, Zigmas (1992). Lietuvių kalbos istorija (in Lithuanian). Vol. 5: Bendrinės kalbos iškilimas. Vilnius: Mokslo ir enciklopedijų leidykla. OCLC 34077762.
