= Gasparas Cirtautas =

Roman Catholic bishop (1841–1913)

- Bishop of Samogitia
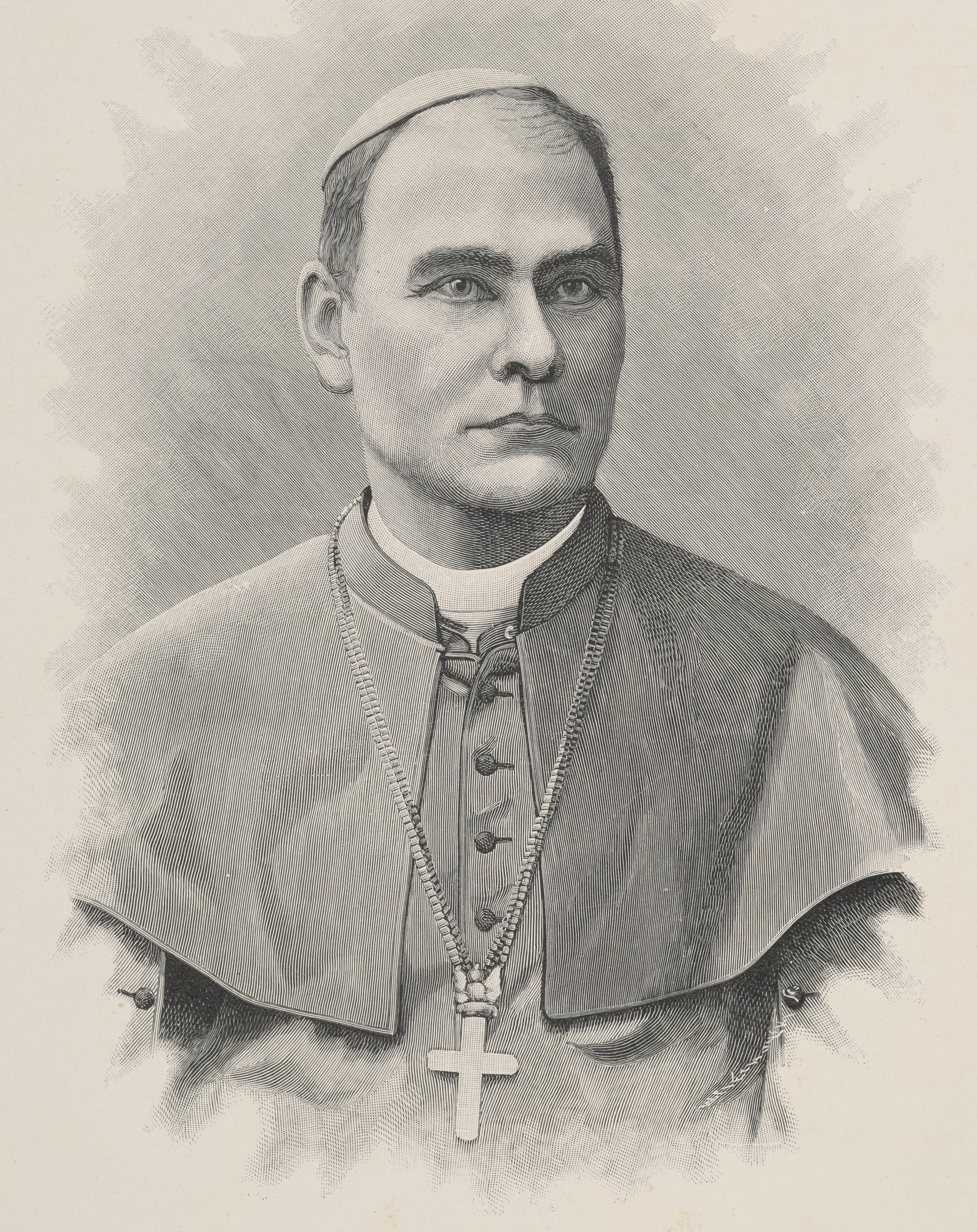
- Installed: 7 April 1910
- Term ended: 17 September 1913
- Predecessor: Mečislovas Leonardas Paliulionis
- Successor: Pranciškus Karevičius
- Other posts: Titular bishop of Kastoria; Auxiliary bishop of Samogitia

Orders
- Ordination: 1868
- Consecration: 12 December 1897

Personal details
- Born: 21 June 1841 Aisėnai, Russian Empire
- Died: 17 September 1913 (aged 72) Berlin, German Empire
- Buried: Kaunas Cathedral
- Denomination: Roman Catholic Church
- Education: Saint Petersburg Roman Catholic Theological Academy

Gasparas Feliksas Cirtautas (Polish: Gaspar Felicjan Cyrtowt; 21 June 1841 – 17 September 1913) was a Roman Catholic bishop of Samogitia from 1910 to 1913.

Educated at the Saint Petersburg Roman Catholic Theological Academy, Cirtautas was ordained as a priest in 1868. He then taught at the Kaunas Priest Seminary (1868–1877) and the Saint Petersburg Roman Catholic Theological Academy (1877–1888). He then became rector of Kaunas Priest Seminary. He succeeded Antanas Baranauskas as the auxiliary bishop of Samogitia in 1897 and Mečislovas Leonardas Paliulionis as the bishop of Samogitia in 1910. He died in 1913 after a cholecystectomy.

== Biography ==
=== Early life and education ===
Cirtautas was born on 21 June [O.S. 9 June] 1841 in Aisėnai in the parish of Veiviržėnai. The family had a total of twelve children (two died in early childhood). Cirtautas' father was a farmer as well as a forest warden. Cirtautas and his brother, the future physician Petras Cirtautas, received education with the help of Ireneusz Kleofas Ogiński, manor owner in Rietavas.

Cirtautas started his education at a primary school in Raseiniai. He graduated from Šiauliai Gymnasium in 1862 with a silver medal and enrolled at the Varniai Priest Seminary. In 1864, he transferred to the Saint Petersburg Roman Catholic Theological Academy. He graduated in 1868 with a master's degree in theology. He was offered to continue his education and earn doctorate, but refused saying that it was an empty title.

=== Career ===
Cirtautas was first assigned as teacher to Kaunas Priest Seminary. He taught classes on Latin, Bible, and dogmatic theology. In 1877, he returned to the Roman Catholic Theological Academy in Saint Petersburg to teach general and special dogmatic theology. In 1888, he returned to Kaunas where he became rector of the priest seminary until his appointment as bishop in 1897. As a rector, he also taught the Bible at the seminary.

Cirtautas became a canon of the Diocese of Samogitia in 1883 and a prelate in 1885.

Antanas Baranauskas, auxiliary bishop of Samogitia, became the bishop of Sejny in August 1897. He was succeeded by Cirtautas who, at the same time, was appointed titular bishop of Kastoria. Tsar Nicholas II confirmed the appointment (according to the 1847 Agreement between the Holy See and Russia) on 24 October 1897. Cirtautas was consecrated on 12 December [O.S. 30 November] 1897 at the Church of St. Catherine in Saint Petersburg.

=== Bishop ===
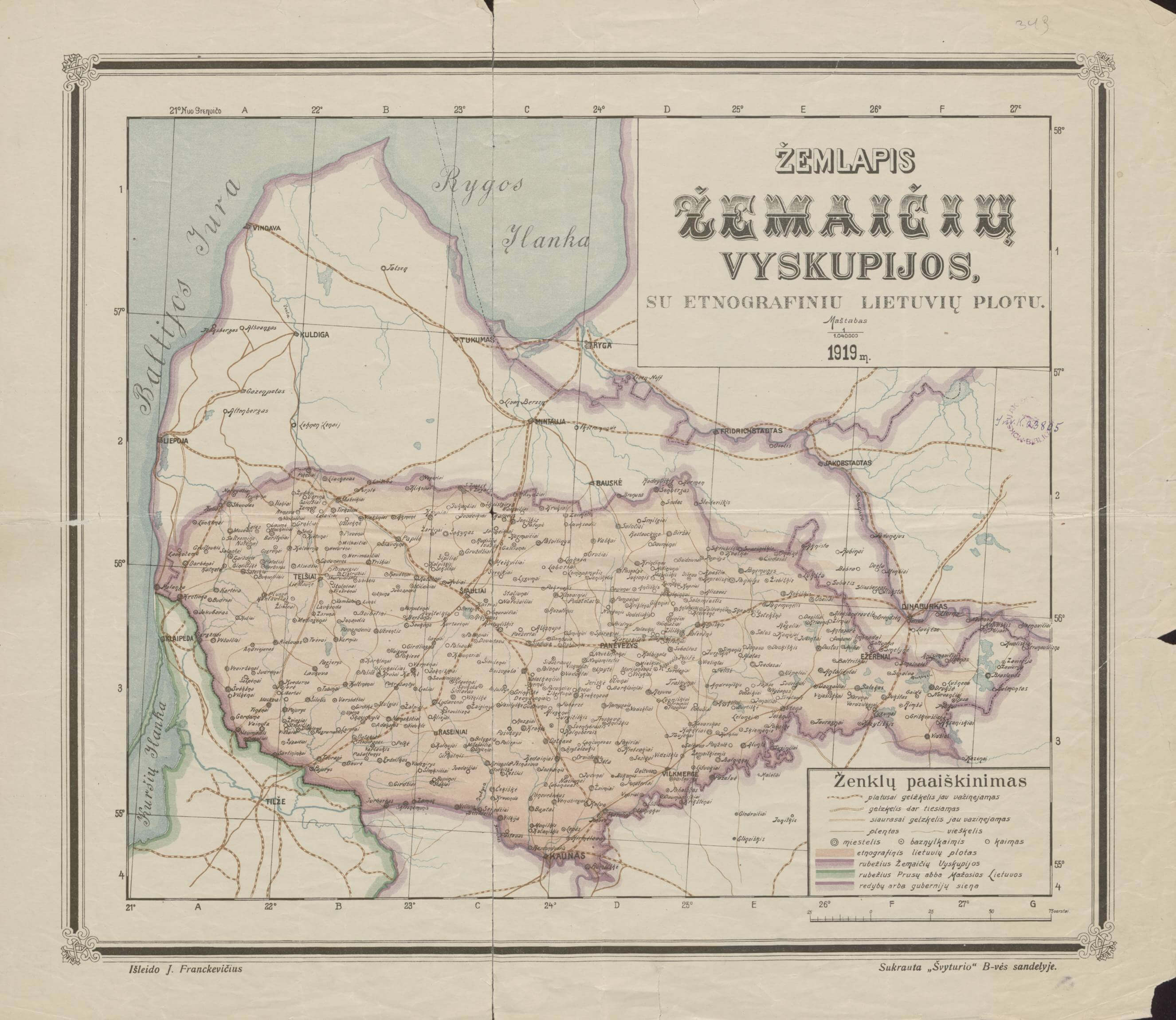
Map of the Diocese of Samogitia in 1919

After the death of bishop Mečislovas Leonardas Paliulionis in May 1908, Cirtautas became the administrator of the Diocese of Samogitia. He was confirmed as bishop by Pope Pius X on 7 April 1910. His ingress at Kaunas Cathedral took place on 17 June 1910.

Cirtautas' secretaries were Bronisław Żongołłowicz and Kazimieras Šaulys. He also supported Juozapas Skvireckas, translator of the full Bible into Lithuanian, and wanted to see him as the next bishop of Samogitia. However, Skvireckas was deemed too patriotic and Pranciškus Karevičius was chosen instead.

==== Polish–Lithuanian relations ====
Cirtautas was born in Samogitia but, like many of the period, was raised in the Polish culture and spoke Polish. Reportedly, he intended to join the anti-Tsarist Uprising of 1863. However, Polish activists did not consider him to be their person. Members of the Polish nobility were mostly absent at both his ingress and his funeral. In his obituary, Kurier Litewski criticized him for his inability to control the "national frenzy" of Lithuanian priests.

Cirtautas supported various Lithuanian Catholic societies, including Saulė Society which organized primary schools, Society of Saint Casimir which published books, Society of Saint Zita which supported female servants, etc. In particular, he supported the Lithuanian Catholic Temperance Society and was temporarily elected its chairman. He also supported the Lithuanian press. During his tenure as bishop, two Catholic periodicals for youth were established that grew into popular youth organizations Ateitis and Pavasaris. Additionally, Bažnytinė apžvalga (Church Review) was established for the clergy.

Cirtautas interfered with the Viltis, a new newspaper that hoped to unite conservative Catholic clergy and more liberal intelligentsia for the common good of the Lithuanian nation. In November 1910, Juozas Tumas published an article in Viltis listing known churches where Lithuanian-language services were removed by orders of Kazimierz Mikołaj Michalkiewicz, administrator of the Diocese of Vilnius. This caused much controversy and, in February 1911, Cirtautas assigned Tumas to Laižuva in northern Lithuania. Effectively, it was an exile and also meant Tumas' departure from Viltis. Cirtautas continued to care about Viltis even while ill. He wanted to see it more pro-Catholic and pressured its publisher the Society of Saint Casimir.

However, Lithuanian authors generally characterize Cirtautas as recognizing but not supporting the Lithuanian National Revival. Adomas Jakštas argued that he supported the use of the Lithuanian language and helped it get established at the seminary, meditations, and recollections, but supported Polish over Lithuanian in a few local disputes (e.g. in church services in Karmėlava, Čekiškė, Žeimiai). Pranas Čepėnas criticized Cirtautas for speaking just in Polish at several public events. Jakštas further criticized Cirtautas for including an equal number of Lithuanians and Poles in the cathedral chapter while Poles were clearly a minority in the diocese. Overall, Cirtautas did not care in which language people prayed, as long as they prayed. He also maintained that the Church should not get involved in ethnic disputes.

==== Other activities ====
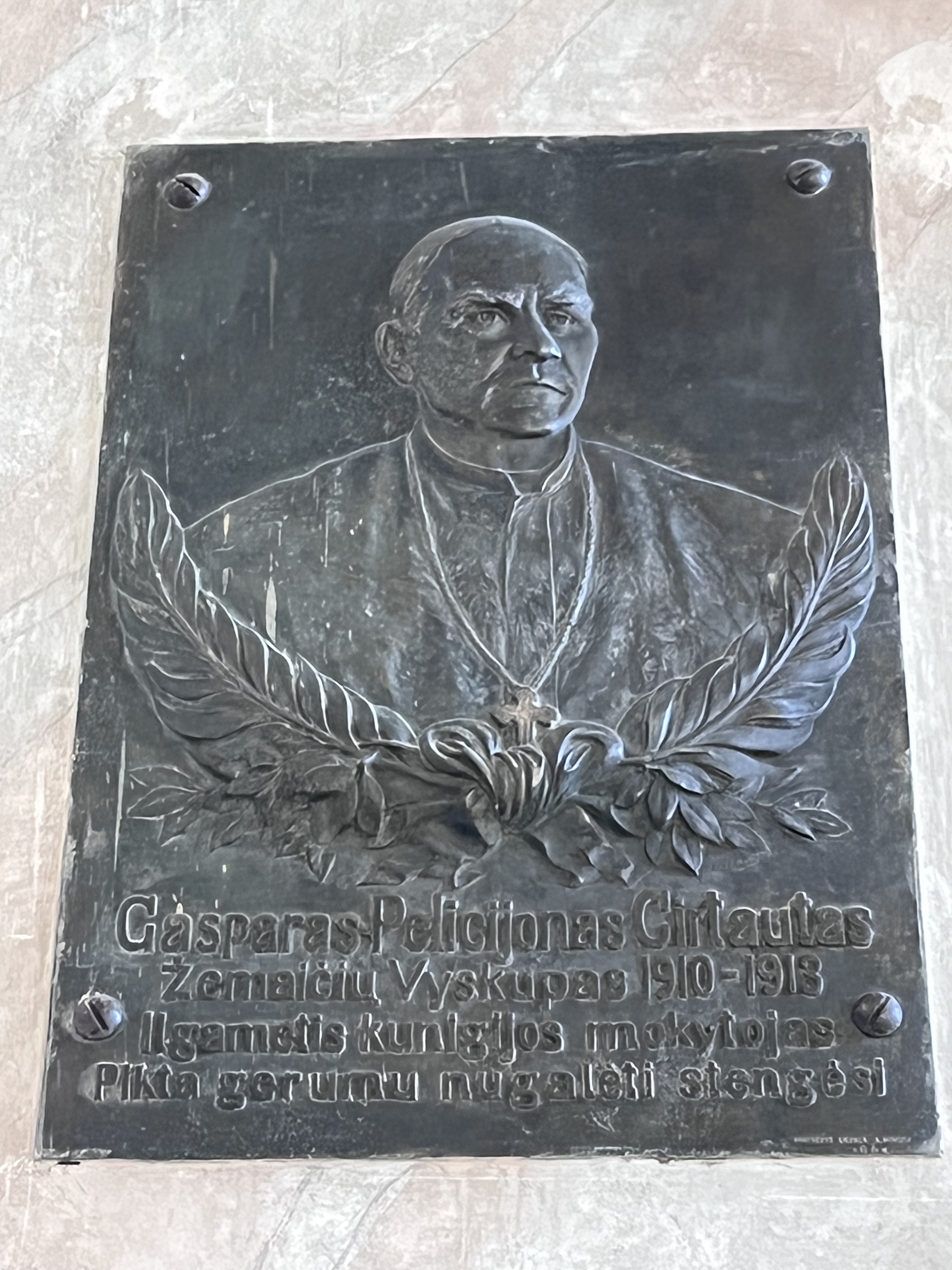
Memorial plaque at Kaunas Cathedral

Cirtautas initiated the construction of the Chapel of the Annunciation of the Blessed Virgin Mary in Šiluva in 1912 (the construction marked the 300th anniversary of the Marian apparition).

Cirtautas avoided issuing pastoral letters, circulars, agendas, or other written communication to the congregation. For example, he did not issue a pastoral letter on the occasion of his ingress. However, he did publish a letter urging priests and the faithful to vote in the 1912 Russian legislative election thus indirectly supporting Catholic candidates.

Cirtautas was charitable. He kept a notebook with donations to various individuals (students, widows, sick) and organizations. He personally donated a total of 1,953 rubles in 1911 and 2,949 rubles in 1912. In his last will, Cirtautas donated all of his assets to various Catholic organizations. For example, he left 1,000 rubles to the Motinėlė Society.

=== Death ===
He died on 17 September [O.S. 4 September] 1917 after a cholecystectomy (a gallstones removal surgery) at the clinic of doctor Hans Kehr in Berlin. His body was transported back to Kaunas on 20 September. A large crowd (up to 40,000 people according to contemporary press reports) followed his transport from the railway station to Kaunas Cathedral. He was buried on 22 September in a crypt of Kaunas Cathedral next to his predecessors Motiejus Valančius and Mečislovas Leonardas Paliulionis. A memorial plaque with Cirtautas' portrait by sculptor Juozas Zikaras was installed at the cathedral in 1926.

== Bibliography ==
- Čepėnas, Pranas (1977). Naujųjų laikų Lietuvos istorija. Vol. I. Chicago: Dr. Kazio Griniaus Fondas. OCLC 3220435.
- Dambrauskas-Jakštas, Aleksandras (1930). Užgesę žiburiai (in Lithuanian). Kaunas: Lietuvių katalikų mokslo akademija.
- Grigaravičius, Algirdas (2009). "Nesantaikos laikai: Vilties redaktoriaus Antano Smetonos pasitraukimas". Kultūros barai (in Lithuanian). 10. ISSN 0134-3106.
- Jonušytė, Regina (24 September 2003). "Tokius gerbia ir priešai... Žemaičių vyskupo Gasparo Felicijono Cirtauto 90-osioms mirties metinėms". XXI amžius (in Lithuanian). Vol. 73, no. 1177. ISSN 2029-1299.
- Jonušytė, Regina (11 October 2013). "Paskutinis Žemaičių vyskupas caro metais. Žemaičių vyskupo Gasparo Felicijono Cirtauto 100-osioms mirties metinėms". XXI amžius (in Lithuanian). Vol. 37, no. 2061. ISSN 2029-1299.
- Kačerauskas, Jonas (2013). Blaivybė Lietuvoje: istorija ir dabartis (PDF) (in Lithuanian). Vilnius: Diemedžio leidykla. ISBN 9789986231776.
- Katilius, Algimantas (2006). "Kauniečių "Motinėlės" draugija Kaune". Kauno istorijos metraštis (in Lithuanian). 7: 85–102. ISSN 2335-8734.
- Katilius, Algimantas (2016). Prelatas Kazimieras Steponas Šaulys. Iš Lietuvos nacionalinio muziejaus archyvo (in Lithuanian). Vilnius: Lietuvos nacionalinis muziejus. ISBN 978-609-8039-93-1.
- Katilius, Algimantas (2025). "Conflicts over the Language of Additional Services in the Samogitian (Telšiai) Diocese: Scale and Chronology". Studia Ełckie. 2 (27): 163–184. doi:10.32090/SE.270210. ISSN 2353-1274.
- L. G. (11 September 1913). "A. a. Žemaičių vyskupo Gasparo l-jo laidotuvės". Viltis (in Lithuanian). Vol. 106, no. 893. pp. 1–2.
- Merkelis, Aleksandras (1989) [1934]. Juozas Tumas Vaižgantas (in Lithuanian) (3rd ed.). Vilnius: Vaga. ISBN 5-415-00658-3.
- Streikus, Arūnas (17 November 1998). "Arkivyskupas Juozapas Skvireckas". Bažnyčios žinios (in Lithuanian). Vol. 21.
- "Nauji Lietuvos vyskupai". Tėvynės sargas (in Lithuanian). Vol. 1. January 1898. pp. 1–8.
- "Gasparas Feliksas Cirtautas". Visuotinė lietuvių enciklopedija (in Lithuanian). Mokslo ir enciklopedijų leidybos centras. 4 August 2021 [2018].
- Vyšniauskas, Marius (18 November 2014). "Vardai, įamžinti akmenyje". kamane.lt (in Lithuanian).
