= Ona Galdikaitė =

Lithuanian poet, nun and dissident (1898–1990)

- Born: 17 September 1898; Giršinai, Russian Empire
- Died: 9 February 1990 (aged 91); Kaunas, Lithuania
- Other name: Sesuo Marija Augustina
- Occupations: nun, poet
- Years active: 1928–1990
- Known for: founding the Franciscan Congregation of the Divine Heart of Jesus

Ona Galdikaitė also known as Sesuo Marija Augustina (Sister Mary Augustina) (17 September 1898 – 1990) was a Lithuanian poet, nun, and dissident. She was the founder of the Franciscan Congregation of the Divine Heart of Jesus.

== Early life and education ==
Ona Galdikaitė was born on 17 September 1898 in Giršinai village, near Mosėdis, in the Skuodas district of Lithuania. She was the daughter of Feliksas Galdikas, and Fortunata Karevičiūtė, a niece of Archbishop Pranciškus Karevičius, and sister of the painter, Adomas Galdikas. She studied at the Saulės Gymnasium in Kaunas and after completing her prep school education in 1919 continued her studies in Germany. She attended the University of Münster beginning in 1920, studying pedagogy, philosophy and theology until 1921.

The following year, she joined the Franciscan Sisters of Penance and Christian Love of the Secular Franciscan Order and took the name Sesuo Marija Augustina (Sister Mary Augustina). Her uncle, on a trip back from Rome, came to the monastery and put forth arguments to establish an order in Lithuania. The monastery sent the Mother Superior Chryzolą and Sister Adelheit, who had been a missionary in Africa, with Sister Mary Augustina as translator in 1924 to investigate whether establishing an order was feasible. They determined that due to the war, there were no funds and little opportunity and returned to Germany, where Sister Mary Augustina returned to school, graduating from the University of Münster and furthering her studies in Cologne.

== Interwar ==
In 1928, her uncle again persuaded Sister Mary Augustina to attempt to start a monastery in Lithuania. In 1929, Placida Paulikauskaitė donated her farm in Padvariai in the Kretinga district for the purpose of establishing the order. The farm contained about 43 hectares of rocky land, and had an old abandoned homestead, an apiary and five thatched-roof huts, in which the sisters were able to live. She consecrated a temporary chapel and founded the Franciscan Congregation of the Divine Heart of Jesus.

She and the other sisters farmed and began assisting the poor. In 1930, they received their permit to make the monastery permanent, to take their vows and canonical approval of the congregation. On 11 April 1930, Sister Mary Augustina, as head of the order, and Ona Grigaitytė (Sister Leandra) took their vows and accepted seven postulants. The sisters began a school for children, provided shelter for elderly women and orphans and took up sewing ecclesiastical vestments, and by 1932 had completed a 2-story wooden monastery. In 1933, they bought a second structure in Kaunas, had it consecrated by Archbishop Karevičius and established a Montessori boarding school. Six sisters remained at the farm and twelve sisters ran the boarding school.

== Post-war ==
In 1946, the Lithuanian Soviet Socialist Republic took over the monastery and all of the sisters relocated to the property in Kaunas. Secretly the nuns continued performing the church's work, catechizing children and adults, performing sacraments for the sick, and writing religious literature. In 1949, Sister Mary Augustina was arrested, held in Kaunas, then sent to Kretinga and finally to Vilnius, where she was sentenced to ten years imprisonment. She was sent to the concentration camp at Abezė near Inta in the Komi Republic of Russia and after five years received amnesty.

Upon her release, she returned to the sisters in Kaunas and resumed with their works. Between 1977 and 1990, Sister Mary Augustina participated in the underground literary movement, writing poems under the pseudonym "Vynmedžio šakelė" (meaning vine stem), which were published in Rūpintojėlis (Pensive Christ). She also translated theological works from French, German, and Polish sources into Lithuanian.

Sister Mary Augustina died on 9 February 1990 at the home in Kaunas. In 1998, the order which she founded had 40 permanent members, 4 laity, and 1 novitiate. A prayerbook printed in 1998 contains many of her poems and hymns.
