= Metropolis of Kastoria =

Greek Orthodox diocese

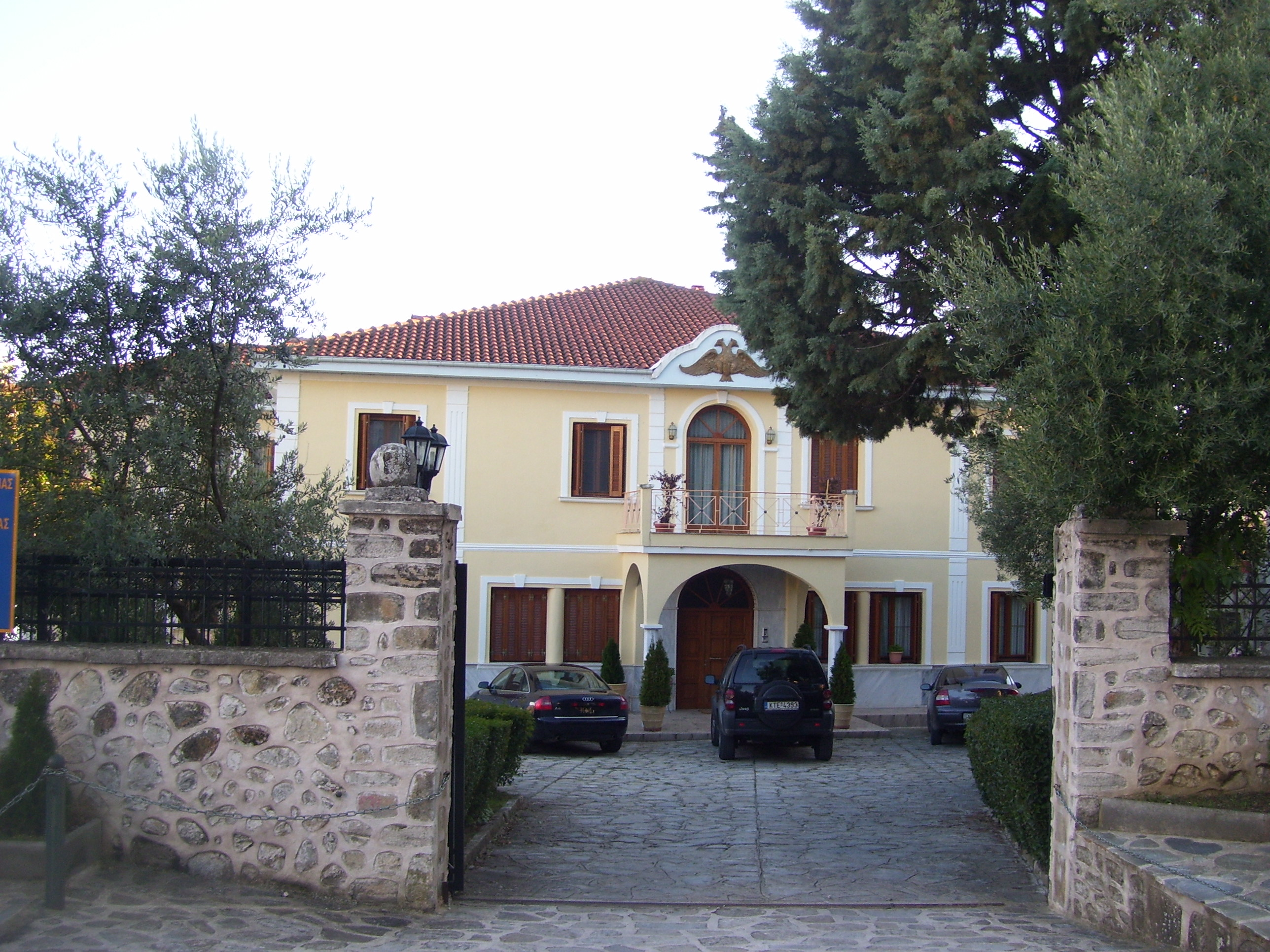

The Metropolis of Kastoria (Greek: Ιερά Μητρόπολις Καστοριάς) is one of the metropolises of the New Lands in Greece that are within the jurisdiction of the Ecumenical Patriarchate of Constantinople but de facto are administered for practical reasons as part of the Church of Greece under an agreement between the churches of Athens and Constantinople. (Note: "Codified in the 1928 Patriarchal and Synodical Act, the "New Lands" were entrusted to the temporary stewardship of the Church of Greece, provided that the Church respected the terms of the Act. The Act subsequently has been incorporated into several pieces of Greek legislation (Laws 3615/1928, 5438/1932, 599/1977, and Article 3, paragraph 1 of the current Greek Constitution), thereby recognizing the ecclesiastical agreement between the two sides.")

Kastoria is also a Latin Catholic titular see, and in the early 20th century hosted a Bulgarian Orthodox bishopric.

== History ==
At first a suffragan of Thebes, the bishopric was, at least by the reign of Basil II in the early 11th century, the first suffragan see of the Archbishopric of Ohrid. Le Quien mentions only three bishops, all of the period after the East–West Schism: Joasaph in 1564, Hierotheus, who went to Rome about 1650, and Dionysius Mantoucas; but that list can easily be extended.

In the early 20th century the town was the seat of a Bulgarian Orthodox bishopric with 2,224 families, 32 priests, and 22 churches.

Today, for the Ecumenical Patriarchate of Constantinople and the Church of Greece the see is the Metropolis of Kastoria and Exarchate for Upper Macedonia, in the so-called "New Lands" of Greece.

On October 3, 2019 the Holy Synod of the Patriarchate of Constantinople resolved to glorify seven New Martyrs of Kastoria, at the proposal of Metropolitan Seraphim (Papakostas) of Kastoria, including the following: (Note: The resolution of the Holy Synod of the Ecumenical Patriarchate was as follows: (in Greek) α) Ἀπεφασίσθη, τῇ εἰσηγήσει τῆς Κανονικῆς Ἐπιτροπῆς, κατόπιν θεωρήσεως τοῦ ἁρμοδίως διαβιβασθέντος τῇ Μητρί Ἐκκλησίᾳ σχετικοῦ αἰτήματος τοῦ Σεβ. Μητροπολίτου Καστορίας κ. Σεραφείμ, ἡ ἀναγραφή εἰς τό Ἁγιολόγιον τῆς Ὀρθοδόξου Ἐκκλησίας τῶν μαρτυρικῶς τελειωθέντων ὑπέρ τῆς ἀμωμήτου ἡμῶν πίστεως: α) Μάρκου Πέτρου Μαρκούλη ἐκ Κλεισούρας, β) Νούλτζου ἐκ Καστορίας, καί τῶν σύν αὐτῷ ἀθλησάντων, γ) Γεωργίου τοῦ ἐκ Καστορίας, δ) ἱερέως Βασιλείου Καλαπαλίκη, ἐφημερίου Χιλιοδεντρίου Καστορίας καί ε) Ἀρχιμανδρίτου Πλάτωνος Ἀϊβαζίδη.)

- New Martyr Markos Markoulis of Kleisoura, Kastoria, hanged in Argos Orestiko (1598)
- New Martyr Ioannis Noultzos, martyred together with his brother and brother-in-law in Kastoria (1696)
- New Martyr George of Kastoria, martyred by the Hagarenes in the Acarnania region.
- New Hieromartyr Vasilios Kalapaliki, priest of Chiliodendro, Kastoria (gr) (1902)
- New Hieromartyr Archimandrite Platon (Aivazidis), Protosyncellus of Metropolitan Germanos Karavangelis (1921) (Note: Platon was hanged by the Turks on September 21, 1921.: See: (in Greek) Πλάτων Αϊβαζίδης. Βικιπαίδεια. (Greek Wikipedia).)

The "Synaxis of the Saints of Kastoria" is a moveable feast that is held on the Third Sunday of November.

== Greek Orthodox Metropolitans ==
- Kallinikos (Georgatos) 2021
- Seraphim (Papakostas) 1996–2020
- Gregorios III (Papoutsopoulos) 1985-1996
- Gregorios II (Maistros) 1974-1985
- Dorotheos (Giannaropoulos) 1958-1973
- Nikiphoros II (Papasideris) 1936-1958
- Ioakeim (Leptidis) 1911-1931
- Ioakeim (Vaxevanidis) 1908-1911
- Germanos (Karavangelis) 1900-1908
- Athanasios (Kapouralis) 1899-1900
- Philaretos (Vafeidis) 1889-1899
- Gregorios (Drakopoulos) 1888-1889
- Kyrillos (Dimitriadis) 1882-1888
- Constantine (Isaakidis) 1880-1882
- Hilarion 1874-1879
- Nicephorus I 1841-1874
- Athanasions (Mitilinaios) 1836-1841

== Active Greek Orthodox Monasteries ==
=== For men ===
- Dormition of the Virgin Mary - Panagia Mavriotissa
- Agion Anargyroi Melissotopos
- Agia Paraskevi Vasileiadou (Note: (in Greek) Αγίας Παρασκευής Βασιλειάδος.)
- Agios Georgios Eptahoriou (Note: (in Greek) Αγίου Γεωργίου Επταχωρίου.)

=== For women ===
- Monastery of the Nativity of the Virgin of Kleisoura (Note: (in Greek) Ιερά Μονή Γενεθλίου της Θεοτόκου Κλεισούρας.)
- Saint Nicholas Tsirilovou (Note: (in Greek) Αγίου Νικολάου Τσιριλόβου.)
- Panagias Faneromenis (Note: (in Greek) Παναγίας Φανερωμένης.)
- Monastery of St. George Melanthiou (Note: (in Greek) Ιερά Μονή Αγίου Γεωργίου Μελανθίου.)

== Latin bishopric ==
Some ten Latin bishops of Castoria are known from the 13th to the 15th centuries.

=== Latin titular see ===
Castoria is listed by the Catholic Church as a titular bishopric since the 15th century.

It is vacant for decades, having had the following incumbents, all of the lowest (episcopal) rank :

- Silvestro de Benedetti, OSBVall (1432.01.23 – ?)
- Francis Sexello, OFM (1507.01.07 – ?)
- Juan López (1520.09.22 – ?)
- François Daussayo, OESA (1531.03.18 – ?)
- Gedeon van der Gracht (1536.01.10 – ?)
- Charles Pinello, OESA (1546.04.16 – ?)
- Esteban de Esmir (1639.04.03 – 1641.01.05)
- Johannes van Neercassel, CO (1662.06.23 – 1686.06.06)
- Gioachino Maria de’ Oldo (1725.03.03 – 1726.12.09)
- Bishop-elect Paolino Sandulli, OSB (1727.03.17 – ?)
- John Mary of St. Thomas Albertini, OCD (1780.12.23 – 1783?)
- Charles Lamothe, MEP (1793.02.05 – 1816.05.22)
- Jean-Jacques Guérard, MEP (1816.05.23 – 1823.06.18)
- Francisco Ferreira de Azevedo (1820.05.29 – 1844.07.25)
- Jean-François Ollivier, MEP (1824.04.06 – 1827.05.27)
- Joseph-Marie-Pélagie Havard, MEP (1828.03.21 – 1838.07.05)
- John Fennelly (1841.04.30 – 1868.01.23)
- Johann Jakob Kraft (1868.09.24 – 1884.06.09)
- Francesco Gašparić (1884.11.13 – 1897)
- Gasparas Cirtautas (1897.07.21 – 1910.04.07)
- Marie-Augustine Chapuis, MEP (1911.03.06 – 1913.05.21)
- Ferenc Gossman (1913.07.01 – 1931.10.11)
- Joaquín Alcaide y Bueso, Capuchin Franciscans (O.F.M. Cap.) (1931.12.15 – 1943.02.21)
- Stanislas Courbe (1943.06.22 – 1971.04.22)

== Bibliography ==
- Kiminas, Demetrius (2009). The Ecumenical Patriarchate: A History of Its Metropolitanates with Annotated Hierarch Catalogs. Wildside Press LLC. ISBN 9781434458766.
