= Šilalė oil field =

Oil field in Lithuania

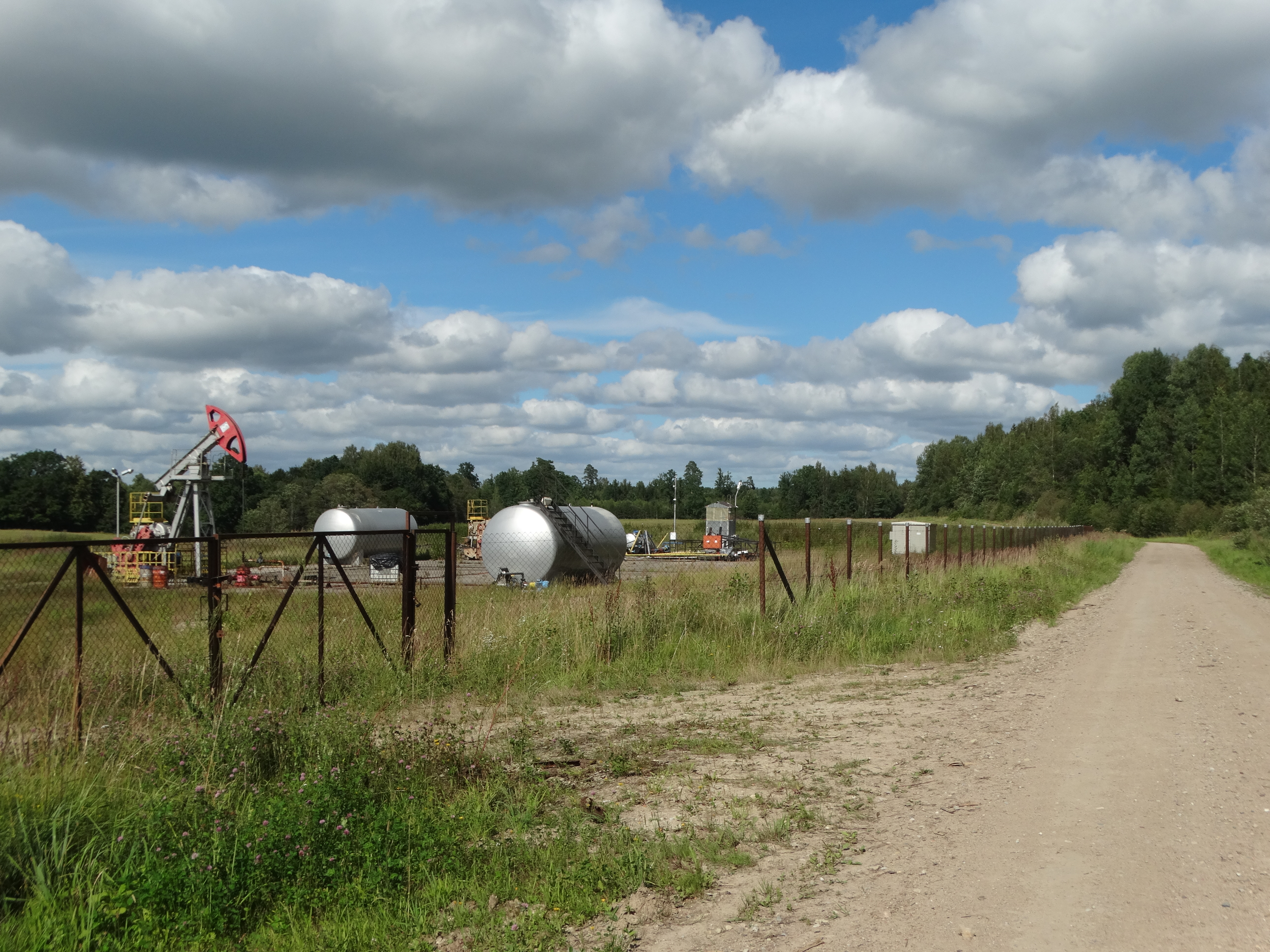
- Šilalė oil field infrastructure
- Country: Lithuania
- Location: Stemplės, Šilutė District Municipality
- Block: Gargždai Oil Block
- Offshore/onshore: onshore
- Coordinates: 55°28′53.9″N 21°46′59.4″E
- Operator: Minijos nafta

Field history
- Start of production: 2007

Production
- Estimated oil in place: 1.254 million tonnes (~ 1.461×10^{6} m^{3} or 9.192 million bbl)
- Estimated gas in place: 0.0034×10^{9} m^{3} (0.12×10^{9} cu ft)

The Šilalė oil field is an oil field located in the Gargždai Oil Block, Šilutė District Municipality.

== History ==
Diegliai oil field started production in 2007.

Lithuanian government sold the license of Gargždai Oil Block to Lithuanian-Danish company Minijos nafta that is currently operating the field.

== See also ==
- List of oil fields
