= Wincenty Kluczyński =

Roman Catholic archbishop (1847 – 1917)

Servant of God Wincenty Kluczyński
- Titular archbishop of Philippopolis
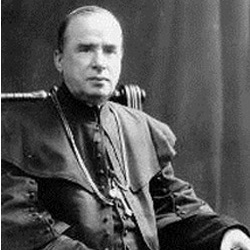
- In office: 26 October 1914 – 10 February 1917
- Previous post: Archbishop of Mohilev (1910 – 1914)

Orders
- Ordination: 23 October 1871 by Motiejus Valančius
- Consecration: 16 May 1910 by Kasper Felicjan Cyrtowt

Personal details
- Born: 30 September 1847 Sharkawshchyna
- Died: 10 February 1917 (aged 69) Alupka

Wincenty Kluczyński (30 September 1847 – 10 February 1917) was a titular archbishop of Philippopolis from 1914 until his death in 1917. He previously served as archbishop of the Archdiocese of Mohilev from 1910 to 1914.

== Biography ==
Wincenty Kluczyński was born on 30 September 1847 in Sharkawshchyna to Adolf Kluczyński, a municipal notary, and Franciszka Korsakówna. He attended a six-year gymnasium at Daugavpils; after he graduated, he began attending the Vilnius St. Joseph Seminary. After 2 years, he was transferred to the Saint Petersburg Roman Catholic Theological Academy, where he obtained a magister's degree in theology. He was ordained a deacon in 1871 by Józef Maksymilian Staniewski, auxiliary bishop of Mohilev, and was ordained a priest on 23 October 1871 by Motiejus Valančius.

On 25 November 1871, Kluczyński was appointed a professor of the Vilnius St. Joseph Seminary, where he taught dogmatics, moral theology and scripture for 28 years. He was appointed a professor of the Saint Petersburg Roman Catholic Theological Academy in 1879; however, sickness resulted in him staying at Vilnius. He was appointed inspector of the Seminary on 11 July 1883. On 25 April of the same year, he was appointed honorary canon of the cathedral chapter of Vilnius; later, in 1896, he was made a regular canon. Kluczyński founded the Sisters of Angels, a habitless congregation that focuses on evangelization, on 31 March 1889 in Vilnius.

Kluczyński was appointed a Prelate of Honour of His Holiness in 1901, and received a doctorate in theology in Rome on 8 January 1905. On 7 April 1910, he was appointed archbishop of the Archdiocese of Mohilev by Pope Pius X; he was consecrated on 16 May 1910 in the Church of St. Catherine by Kasper Felicjan Cyrtowt, assisted by Stefan Denisewicz and Jan Cieplak. He assumed control of the Diocese on 23 May, and received his pallium on 1 January 1912. He resigned as archbishop of Mohilev on 21 July 1914, after which the Holy See appointed him as titular bishop of Philippopolis on 26 October 1914. He died on 10 February 1917 in Alupka, and was originally buried at the cemetery in Vyborg. His remains were later transferred to Vilnius Cathedral.

Kluczyński's cause for beatification was opened by Władysław Blin.
