= Stemplės =

- Stemplės
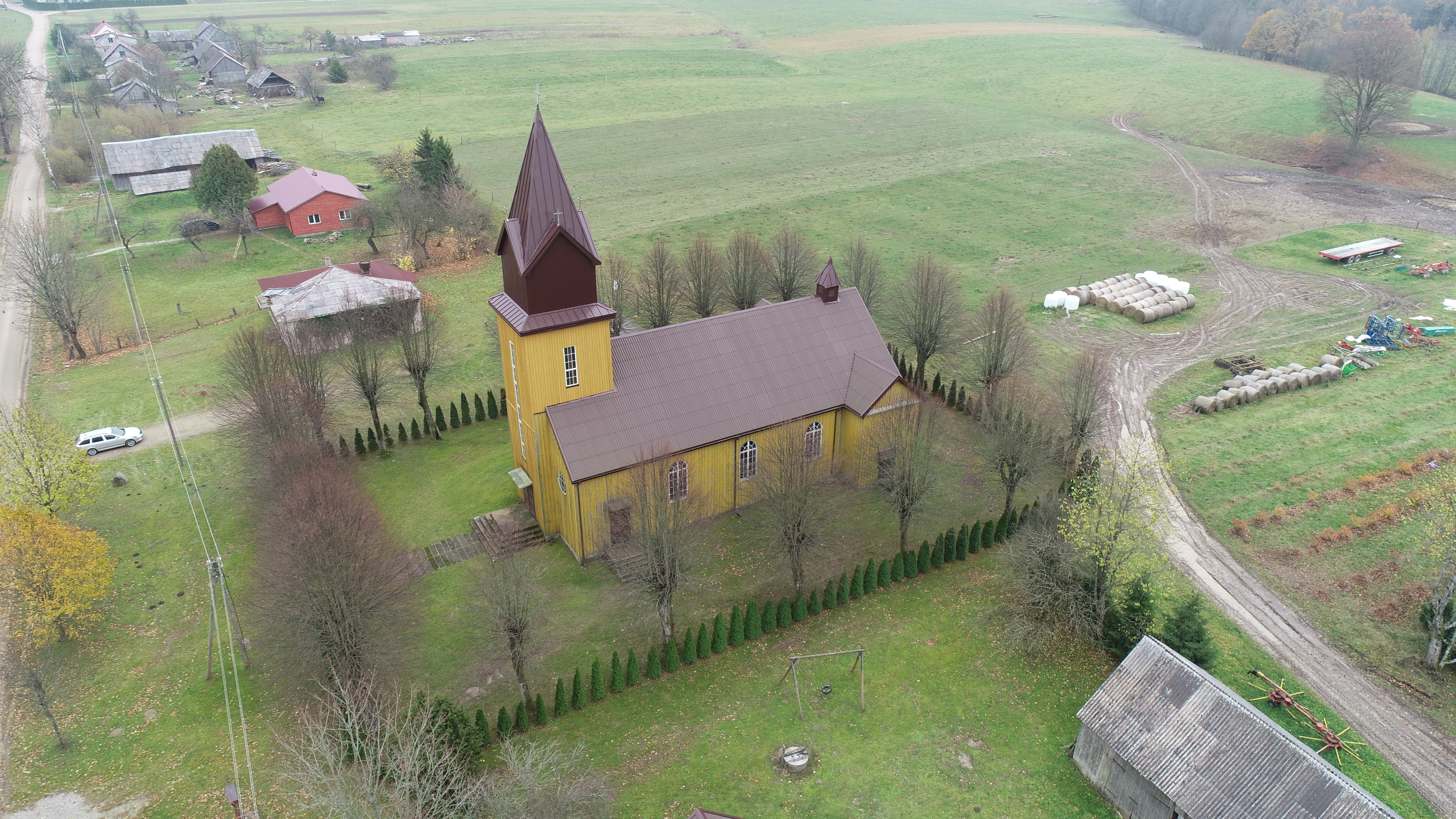
- view of Stemplės

- Location of Stonaičiai
- Coordinates: 55°30′10.8″N 21°48′14.4″E
- Country: Lithuania
- Ethnographic region: Lithuania Minor
- County: Klaipėda County
- Municipality: Šilutė district municipality
- Eldership: Švėkšna eldership

Population (2021)
  - Total: 44
- Time zone: UTC+2 (EET)
  - Summer (DST): UTC+3 (EEST)
- Climate: Dfb

Stemplės is a village in the south of the Klaipėda County in western Lithuania. The village was part of the Klaipėda Region and ethnographic Lithuania Minor.

== History ==
In 2007 the nearby Šilalė oil field started the production.

== Demography ==
=== Historical population ===
Historical population

Year	Pop.	±% p.a.
1902	169	—
1923	312	+2.96%
1959	140	−2.20%
1970	117	−1.62%
1979	112	−0.48%

Year	Pop.	±% p.a.
1989	86	−2.61%
2001	99	+1.18%
2011	85	−1.51%
2021	44	−6.37%

Source: 1902, 1923, 1959 & 1970, 1979, 1989, 2001, 2011
