= Aleksandras Kačanauskas =

Lithuanian composer (1882–1959)

Aleksandras Kačanauskas (Kaunas 1882 – 16 November 1959 in Vilnius) was a Lithuanian composer, organist, singer (baritone), choir director and teacher.

== Recordings ==
- Aleksandras Kačanauskas – Vokaliniai Kūriniai Мелодия – С10-17607-8 Vinyl, LP 1982
