= Kazimieras Paltarokas =

Roman Catholic bishop

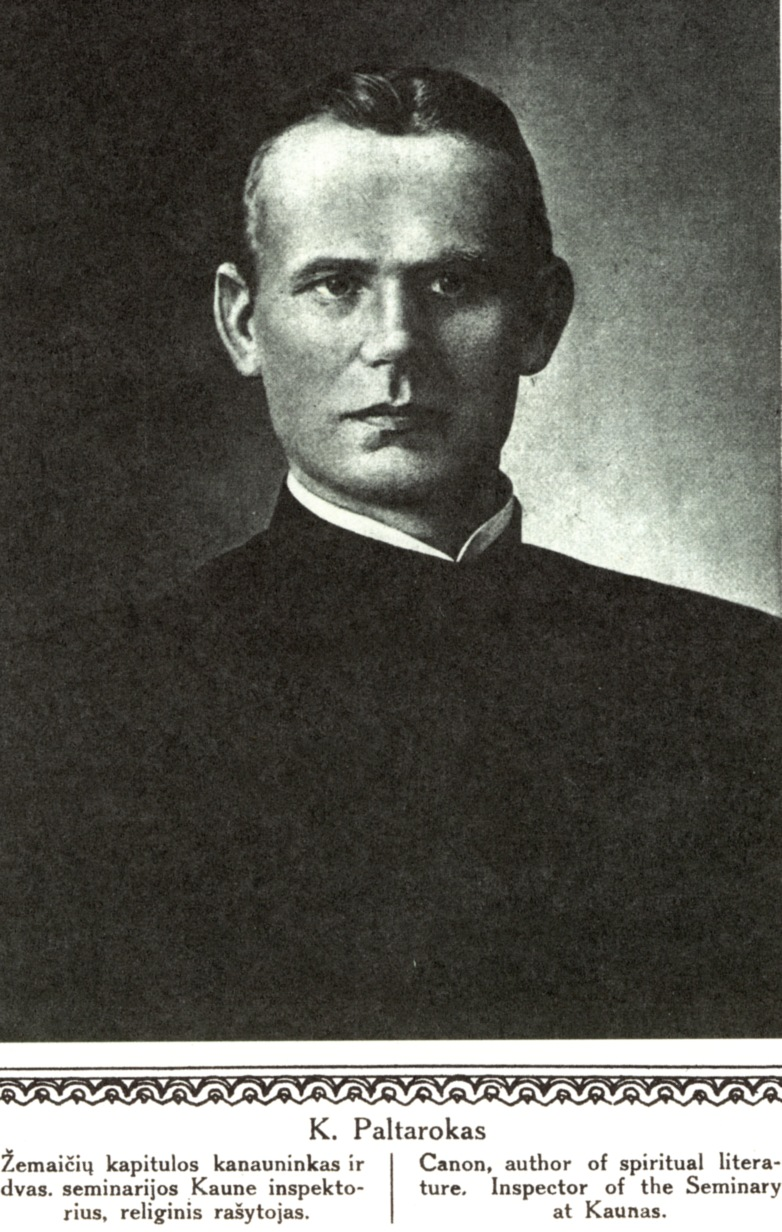
Kazimieras Paltarokas

Kazimieras Paltarokas (22 October 1875 in Linkuva – 3 January 1958) was a Lithuanian clergyman and bishop for the Roman Catholic Diocese of Panevėžys. He was ordained in 1902 and he was appointed a bishop in 1926. He was an active book smuggler of the Lithuanian language literature during the Lithuanian press ban.

In 1949, Paltarokas was the last of the eleven Roman Catholic bishops remaining in Lithuania after the others had been eliminated by the Soviet regime, and he was compelled to go into hiding. Among the other bishops, Archbishop Juozapas Skvireckas of Kaunas went into exile in Austria, Bishop Teofilius Matulionis was deported to Siberia and poisoned, Auxiliary Bishop Pranciškus Ramanauskas was also deported to Siberia, Bishop Vincentas Borisevičius was shot in 1946, and Bishop Antanas Karosas died of natural causes in 1947 and no successor was appointed. In 1954, the Soviet press published a pastoral letter purportedly authored by Paltarokas, claiming that Lithuania had freedom of religion, but it was denounced as a forgery. He died in Vilnius in 1958.
