= Padvariai =

- village
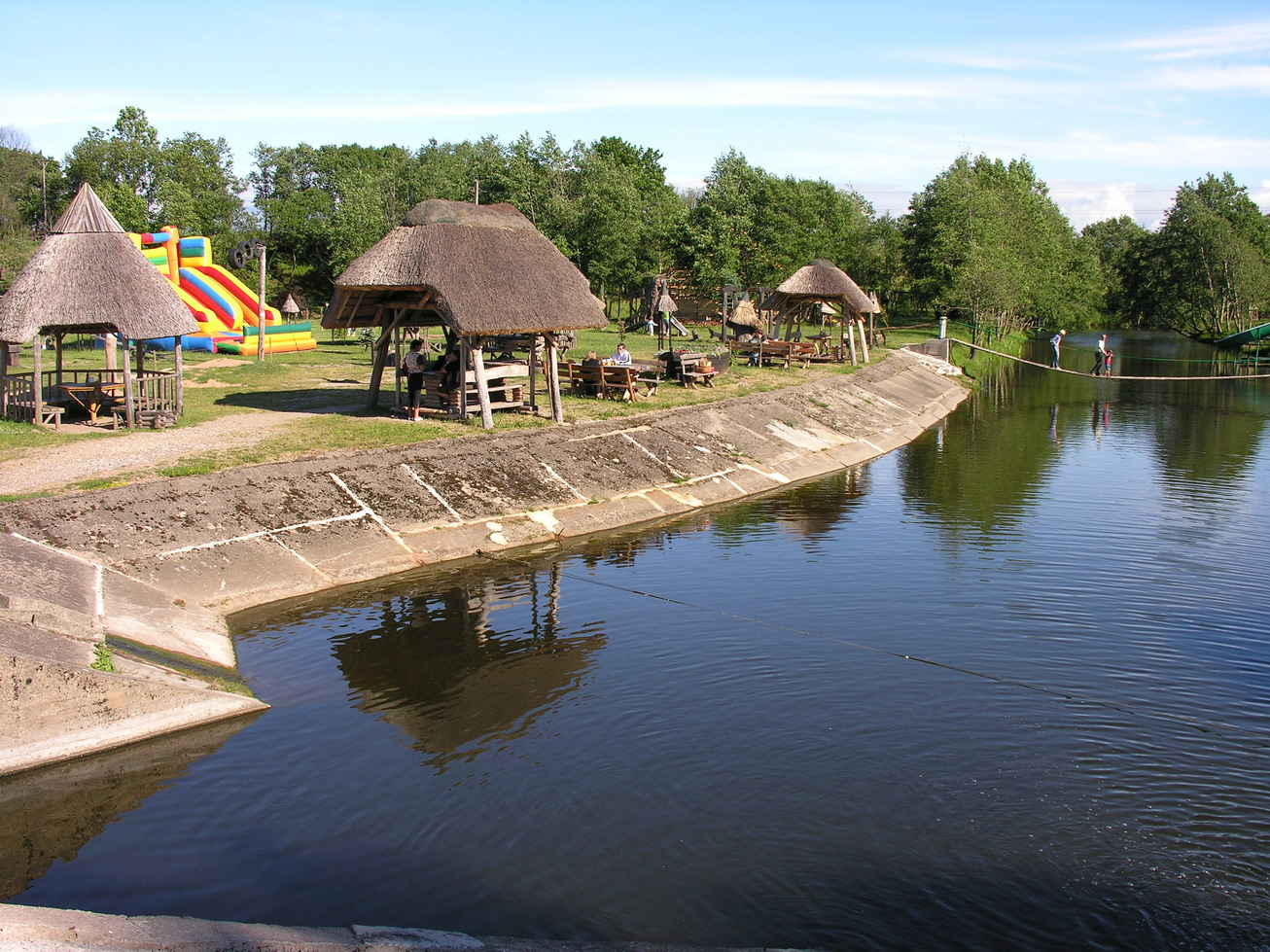
- Padvariai

- Location within Lithuania
- Coordinates: 55°54′29″N 21°16′59″E
- Country: Lithuania
- County: Klaipėda County
- Municipality: Kretinga District Municipality
- Eldership: Kretinga Eldership

Population (2011)
  - Total: 1,308

Padvariai is a village in Klaipėda County, Lithuania. It is located just north of Kretinga.
