= Juozapas Skvireckas =

Lithuanian archbishop (1873–1959)

His Excellency Juozapas Jonas Skvireckas
- Archbishop of Kaunas
- Church: Roman Catholic
- Archdiocese: Kaunas
- Appointed: 5 April 1926
- In office: 1926–1959
- Successor: Vincentas Sladkevičius

Orders
- Ordination: 24 June 1899
- Consecration: 13 July 1919 by Antanas Karosas

Personal details
- Born: September 18, 1873 Pašilaičiai, Vilnius, Russian Empire
- Died: December 3, 1959 (aged 86) Zams, Austria

Juozapas Jonas Skvireckas (18 September 1873 – 3 December 1959) was a Lithuanian archbishop of Kaunas (1926–1959).

Skvireckas was born in Pašilaičiai or near Pumpėnai. He attended high school in Panevėžys and the seminary at Žemaičių Kalvarija, and he was ordained in 1899. During the First World War, he performed pastoral duties in Smolensk and Tula. He was made a titular bishop in 1919, and in 1925 he became archbishop of Kaunas.

From 1911 to 1937, he translated the Bible into Lithuanian; it was published in six volumes by the Society of Saint Casimir. During the occupation of the Baltic States by the Nazis, Skvireckas and his assistant, Bishop Vincentas Brizgys, initially welcomed the Nazis. Skvireckas provided chaplains for Lithuanian-crewed Nazi auxiliary units. Later, however, Skvireckas issued multiple protests to Nazi authorities regarding the conditions of the Catholic Church in Lithuania. He also sent reports to the Vatican, and in 1942 he started receiving instructions from the papal office. He intervened on behalf of the Jewish population, and in 1942 it was reported he was wounded by the Nazis in an incident that left another priest dead—however, it was in fact Archbishop Mečislovas Reinys that had been injured. In 1944, Skvireckas, Brizgys and over 200 other Lithuanian clergymen left Kaunas with retreating German forces and went into exile. He settled in Austria, where he died in Zams in 1959. After his death, the post of (arch)bishop of Kaunas was vacant until 1989.

Preceded by Pranciškus Karevičius, MIC (1914–1926)	Archbishop of Kaunas; 1926–1959	Succeeded by Vincentas Sladkevičius
