= Workers' Group of Lithuania =

The Workers' Group of Lithuania (Note: In the Telšiai electoral district, the group was listed as the Group of Workers and Poor Peasants (Darbininkų ir vargingųjų valstiečių sąrašas).) (Lithuanian: Lietuvos darbininkų kuopa) was a front organization of the Communist Party of Lithuania that participated in the elections to the First and Second Seimas of Lithuania in 1922 and 1923. Members of this group became known as Kuopininkai ("groupers").

The Communist Party and various communist organizations were outlawed in Lithuania. Therefore, to participate in the elections, a new political group was created. The Workers' Group received roughly 5% of the vote and five of its candidates were elected to the First Seimas. They were obstructive and destructive, and the press openly referred to them as "Bolshevik agents".

The First Seimas was deadlocked and was dismissed in March 1923. The counterintelligence section of the General Staff of the Lithuanian Army issued an order to arrest members of the Workers' Group in April 1923. About 200 people were arrested, and 92 of them tried by a military court. The court proceedings started after three years, only after the left-wing victory in the elections to the Third Seimas of Lithuania. All defendants were acquitted and released on 12 June 1926. The following day, communists organized a rally that almost turned into a riot. It caused a scandal in Lithuania and was presented as a major threat to Lithuania and its military by the conservative press.

== Historical background ==
Lithuania declared independence in February 1918, but was able to start organizing its government institutions only after the German defeat in World War I in November 1918. In December 1918, Lithuania was invaded by the Bolshevik forces who established the short-lived Lithuanian Soviet Socialist Republic. As a result, the Communist Party of Lithuania and various communist organizations were outlawed in Lithuania on 7 February 1919. The armed conflict with the Red Army ceased by September 1919 and the Soviet–Lithuanian Peace Treaty was concluded in July 1920. However, communists continued to pose a threat to Lithuania's security and their organizations remained illegal but continued underground operations.

== Preparation for the elections ==
The Communist Party of Lithuania boycotted the elections to the Constituent Assembly of Lithuania in May 1920 as they hoped for a socialist revolution that would make the assembly irrelevant. The 2nd World Congress of the Communist International in July–August 1920 resolved that communists in democracies should participate in parliamentary elections and use government institutions to spread communist ideology. This forced the Lithuanian communist to change their tactics.

Elections to the First Seimas of Lithuania were held on 10 and 11 October 1922. The Communist Party began discussing and preparing for this election in October 1921. In January 1922, Zigmas Angarietis (who lived in Moscow) sent an instruction to prepare a candidate list under the name of Workers' Group.

In total, the communists presented 74 candidates for the election. They were selected by the local party committees (raikoms) and approved by the Central Committee of the Communist Party. All candidates had to be members of the party and willing to follow party's orders. The party then used legal labor unions to officially register the candidates with the electoral commission.

== Platform ==
The first public announcement of the Workers' Group was published on 16 July 1922 in the legal communist newspaper Žarija (Ember) edited by Liudas Adomauskas. The announcement painted a dire situation in Lithuania where unemployment and poverty were on the rise. It called for the creation of a unified workers' front and contained a list of 21 political, mainly populist, agenda items. No other political party seriously considered joining the workers' front, which the communists portrayed as a "betrayal" of workers.

These items included improving workers' conditions (e.g. livable wage, 8-hour workday, unemployment and health insurance, et.) and guaranteeing their rights and freedoms (e.g. freedom of the press, freedom of assembly, etc.). Other items concerned the confiscation of large landholdings and their distribution to poor peasants, revocation of martial law, release of political prisoners, abolition of indirect taxes, etc. Only one item concerned foreign policy and called for "ceasing any military adventures" against the Soviet Union and rejection of any treaty with the Second Polish Republic.

The communists published several electoral brochures which were more radical. For example, they called for the abolition of religious organization, state security agencies, Lithuanian Riflemen's Union, and even the police. They also called for revocation of any laws adopted by the Constituent Assembly of Lithuania that were against the interest of workers. However, as the communists lacked established periodicals, most of the campaigning was conducted in various meetings and rallies across Lithuania.

Several other small leftist workers' groups and parties participated in the elections. For example, Land and Freedom (Žemė ir laisvė) had a similar populist platform aimed at poor peasants. Instead of attempting to cooperate with such groups, the communists attacked them as "political fraud" aimed at confusing the voters. Some Soviet press even claimed that Worker's Labor Union (Darbininkų profesinė sąjunga) was created by the Lithuanian intelligence agencies even though the union's members were also members of the Communist Party. Similarly, the communists distanced themselves from the Workers' and Small Landowners' Group of Panevėžys (Panevėžio apskrities ir miesto darbininkų ir mažažemių grupė) which was established by a local communist group (some candidates on this list were the same as on the Workers' Group). This showcased communist goal to centralize and run all activities through the Central Committee of the Communist Party.

Lithuanian intelligence attempted to contain the activities of the Workers' Group. For example, they searched the residence of Liudas Adomauskas and confiscated a large number of publications. On 1 October 1922, Jonas Kubickis was arrested as editor of the confiscated newspaper Pirmyn!. He was elected to the Seimas, was released on 13 November, and thus was sworn in later than other members of the parliament. The police also prohibited and confiscated communist publications – a total of 41,500 copies of various periodicals and brochures.

== First Seimas ==
The Workers' Group received a total of 51,969 votes (roughly 6.4%) and five of its candidates were elected to the 78-seat Seimas: Kazys Dominas, Pranas Vilūnas, Jonas Kubickis, Kazys Matulaitis, Povilas Norkūnas (he resigned from the Seimas on 6 February 1923). These delegates were obstructive and destructive. For example, they refused to participate in the selection of members of the Seimas' presidium or committees (because the presidium would serve interests of the bourgeoise and not workers), refused to vote on laws without offering any constructive changes, argued using Soviet rhetoric, loudly exclaimed communist propaganda, etc. They also refused to follow the proper decorum. For example, they remained seated when the Seimas honored the fallen soldiers of the Lithuanian Wars of Independence or when a new member of Seimas was sworn in. The main goal of such obstruction was to show that democratic parliamentary system was broken and ineffective, and that only a radical revolution could achieve the results. For such behavior, three members of the group were suspended for ten Seimas sessions. The members were increasingly ostracized and their speeches met with laughter.

Dominas was more active and vocal of the group, and became its unofficial leader (the official leader was Kubickis). He once attempted to turn Seimas' session into a rally demanding the release of political (i.e. communist) prisoners even though he had no written proposals or law drafts. On 28 November 1922, Mykolas Krupavičius presented a document handwritten by Dominas when he was drafted for the mandatory military service. In this document, Dominas renounced his Lithuanian citizenship, claimed to be a citizen of Russia, and thus not subject to the military service. After a parliamentary investigation, Dominas, as a person sentenced by a Lithuanian military court, was ineligible to be a member of the Seimas and he was expelled from Seimas on 1 December. He was replaced by another communist Emilija Šabanienė, but she was an uneducated seamstress and did not actively participate in the proceedings. She was one of the four women in the First Seimas.

== New election and arrests ==
No party won a clear majority and the First Seimas was deadlocked. Ernestas Galvanauskas was selected as the Prime Minister, but he could not get Seimas to approve the cabinet. As the Seimas could not continue in such manner, it was dissolved on 12 March 1923. New elections were held on 12–13 May 1923.

The Worker's Group intended to participate in this election and prepared a list with 62 candidates. However, the Lithuanian government took measures against the Workers' Group. Their list was not registered in the 1st electoral district (Marijampolė), but they regrouped under the name of Lithuanian Small Landowners and Settlers (Lietuvos mažažemiai ir naujakuriai).

At first, publications of kuopininkai were outlawed and confiscated. On 7 April 1923, counterintelligence section of the General Staff of the Lithuanian Army issued an order to arrest members of the Workers' Group. In total, about 200 people were arrested, of which 92 people were put on trial. The list of the Workers' Group was invalidated on 11 May.

It was too late to reprint the ballots, and the Worker's Group received a total of 23,126 votes (2.6%) in the election. It further received 6,797 votes in Telšiai electoral district under the name of Group of Workers and Poor Peasants and 1,534 votes in Marijampolė district under the name of Lithuanian Small Landowners and Settlers.

The new Seimas gathered on 5 June 1923. This time, the Lithuanian Christian Democratic Party and aligned parties won a majority. On 8 June, the Social Democratic Party of Lithuania presented a formal interpellation arguing that the Christian Democrats were able to secure the majority due to violations of electoral law and brute force against their opponents (i.e. arrests of the members of the Workers' Group) and thus a new election should be called. However, the interpellation was voted down.

== Trial ==
Of the arrested people, 17 people were kept in Kaunas Prison while pre-trial investigation and procedures took place. Eleven of them were also accused of communist activities in other cases. The start or the trial was delayed for three years. Members of the Workers' Group were tried by a military court under the martial law starting 17 May 1926. That was just a few days after the election to the Third Seimas on 8–10 May was won by the left-wing Lithuanian Popular Peasants' Union and Social Democratic Party of Lithuania.

92 defendants were accused of being members of an organization that aimed to overthrow the government, public agitation promoting rebellion, encouragement to disobey legitimate orders by the law enforcement demands, and anti-state agitation. Such crimes were punishable up to life imprisonment. The trial was covered in the Lithuanian press, particularly in Lietuvos žinios. Gradually, the court turned into a trial of the Lithuanian intelligence which showed incompetence, was accused of cruel treatment of prisoners, and could not locate key evidence (instructions to Lithuanian communists sent from Moscow).

Court proceedings ended on 10 June 1926, and decision was reached on 12 June – all 92 defendants were acquitted. The following day, the communist organized a rally attended by about 400 people. They started at the Town Hall, continued along the Laisvės alėja, and ended at Kaunas Prison where they demanded release of political prisoners. The protesters carried two red flags, sang "The Internationale", and harassed passersby to take of their hats in respect of the red flags. The protesters clashed with the police and threw stones, but bloodshed was avoided. It was a disorderly rally that almost turned into a riot.

The rally caused a scandal in Lithuania and worsened the public perception of the Soviet Union. The press presented it as a major threat to Lithuania and its military. To prevent further setbacks in the negotiations of the Soviet–Lithuanian Non-Aggression Pact (concluded on 28 September 1926), Moscow ordered the Communist Party of Lithuania to temporarily cease any demonstrations or rallies. Nevertheless, the rally allowed to keep the narrative of "Soviet threat to Lithuania" which became the official pretext for the 17 December 1926 coup d'état which installed President Antanas Smetona.

== See also ==
- Union of the Working People of Lithuania used as a front in the July 1940 elections to the People's Seimas
- Memel Workers' Party, communist party in the Memel Territory

== Bibliography ==
- Ališauskas, Kazys (1953–1966). "Lietuvos kariuomenė (1918–1944)". Lietuvių enciklopedija (in Lithuanian). Vol. XV. Boston, Massachusetts: Lietuvių enciklopedijos leidykla. LCCN 55020366.
- Eidintas, Alfonsas (1991). Lietuvos Respublikos prezidentai (in Lithuanian). Vilnius: Šviesa. ISBN 5-430-01059-6.
- Eidintas, Alfonsas (2015). Antanas Smetona and His Lithuania: From the National Liberation Movement to an Authoritarian Regime (1893-1940). On the Boundary of Two Worlds. Translated by Alfred Erich Senn. Brill Rodopi. ISBN 9789004302037.
- Eidintas, Alfonsas; Žalys, Vytautas; Senn, Alfred Erich (1999). Tuskenis, Edvardas (ed.). Lithuania in European Politics: The Years of the First Republic, 1918–1940 (Paperback ed.). New York: St. Martin's Press. ISBN 0-312-22458-3.
- Grinčalaitis, Vaidas (2016). "Darbininkų kuopos" demokratijos išbandymas Lietuvoje 1922–1926 m. (PDF) (Master's thesis) (in Lithuanian). Vytautas Magnus University. Archived from the original (PDF) on 2022-10-14.
- Lietuvos statistikos metraštis 1924–1926 m. (in Lithuanian). Vol. I. Kaunas: Valstybės spaustuvė. 1927.
- Lukšas, Aras (19 May 2017). "Maskvos agentai Lietuvos Seime". Lietuvos žinios (in Lithuanian).
- Nohlen, Dieter; Stöver, Philip (2010). Elections in Europe: A Data Handbook. Nomos. ISBN 978-3-8329-5609-7.
- Ragauskas, Aivas; Tamošaitis, Mindaugas, eds. (2007). Lietuvos Respublikos Seimų I (1922–1923), II (1923–1926), III (1926–1927), IV (1936–1940) narių biografinis žodynas. Didysis Lietuvos parlamentarų biografinis žodynas (in Lithuanian). Vol. 3. Vilniaus pedagoginis universitetas. ISBN 978-9955-20-345-2.
- "kuopininkai". Visuotinė lietuvių enciklopedija (in Lithuanian). Mokslo ir enciklopedijų leidybos centras. 14 September 2023 [2018].
- "Visiems Lietuvos darbininkams, visoms darbininkų organizacijoms". Žarija (in Lithuanian). Vol. 3. 16 June 1922.
