= Rapolas Skipitis =

20th c. Lithuanian politician

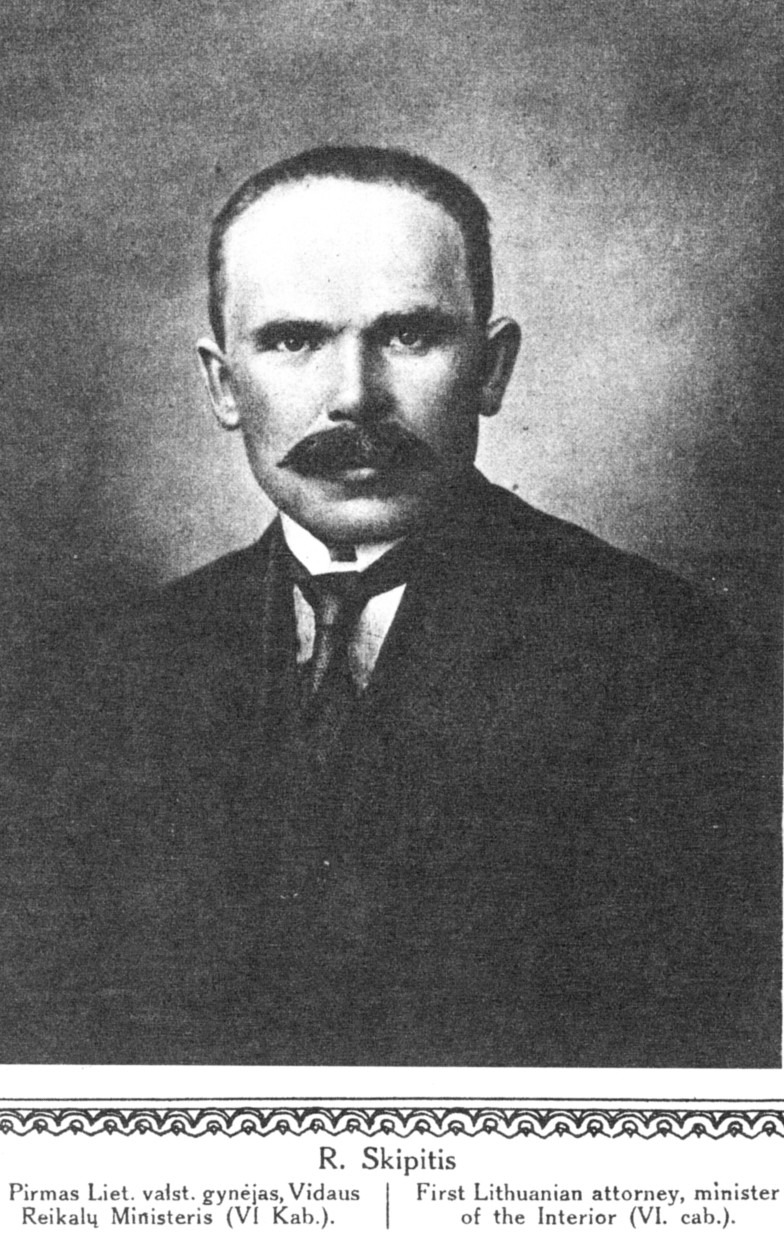
- Portrait of Skipitis in Lithuania Album (1921)

Minister of the Interior
- In office 19 June 1920 – 18 January 1922
- Prime Minister: Kazys Grinius
- Preceded by: Eliziejus Draugelis
- Succeeded by: Kazimieras Oleka

Personal details
- Born: 31 January 1887 Baukai, Smilgiai, Kovno Governorate, Russian Empire
- Died: 23 February 1976 (aged 89) Chicago, United States
- Resting place: Lithuanian National Cemetery
- Party: Democratic National Freedom League (Santara); Farmers' Party
- Education: Imperial Moscow University

Rapolas Skipitis (31 January 1887 – 23 February 1976) was a Lithuanian attorney and politician. In 1920–1922, he was Minister of the Interior and was later elected to the Second and Third Seimas. After the 1926 coup d'état, he chaired the Lithuanian Riflemen's Union (1927–1928), Society for the Support of Lithuanians Abroad (1932–1940), and several other Lithuanian organizations. He also edited several newspapers, including Ūkininko balsas (1925–1928), Trimitas (1927–1928), Namų savininkas and Pasaulio lietuvis (1937–1940). At the start of World War II, he retreated to Germany and joined the Lithuanian Activist Front. He was reserved the seat of Minister of Foreign Affairs in the Provisional Government of Lithuania. After the war, he settled in Chicago where he was active in Lithuanian American cultural life.

== Biography ==
=== Education and World War I ===
Skipitis was born in 1887 to a family of peasants in Baukai. His parents decided to educate him hoping that he would become a priest. He graduated from Palanga Progymnasium in 1904 and Šiauliai Gymnasium in 1909. In Palanga, he met the priest Julijonas Jasienskis, who introduced him to the banned Lithuanian-language press. Already as a school student, he participated in public life by taking part in the protests of the Russian Revolution of 1905 and joining various student activities. He organized aid to political prisoners by forging Russian passports. For these activities he was arrested for a few days in 1908, but released. He continued his studies at the Imperial Moscow University in medicine (1909–1910) and law (1910–1916). Skipitis joined aušrininkai (socialist-leaning student organization) and contributed articles to its magazine Aušrinė. From 1911 to 1915, he chaired the Lithuanian Student Society of Moscow.

In March 1917, he was one of the founders of the Democratic National Freedom League (known as Santara), a moderate liberal party, and became its secretary and editor of its newspaper Santara. He was elected to the Council of the Lithuanian Nation and later the Supreme Lithuanian Council in Russia. In January 1918, together with Augustinas Voldemaras, he was sent as a Lithuanian representative to the Ukrainian People's Republic in Kiev. It was a dangerous journey as it took him across the Soviet–Ukrainian front, and the mission was brief as the Red Army captured Kiev in February 1918. He returned to Voronezh, but learned that many members of the Supreme Lithuanian Council were arrested. He then bribed a Russian official for a permit to return to Lithuania.

=== Political career ===
Skipitis returned to Lithuania in May 1918 and took up teaching in Šiauliai. However, by the end of the year he became a judge in the newly formed Lithuanian judiciary system first in Šiauliai and, when the city was captured by the Soviets during the Lithuanian–Soviet War, in Kaunas. From 6 March 1919 to becoming Minister of the Interior in June 1920, he worked as a public prosecutor. Once, when due to financial difficulties, the Lithuanian government did not pay wages to court officials, Skipitis personally borrowed 12,000 German Papiermarks to pay the wages. He was active in organizing the Lithuanian Riflemen's Union, which sent him to Šiauliai in November 1919 to organize the partisan staff for combat with the West Russian Volunteer Army (Bermontians) during the Lithuanian Wars of Independence.

In fall 1919, he was sent as an official investigator into reports that Povilas Plechavičius' partisans executed Communist civilians near Skuodas and Seda. According to the report of Steponas Kairys to the Lithuanian government, Plechavičius' men killed about 50 Bolsheviks in January–April 1919. Skipitis did not deny the executions but concluded that Plechavičius served Lithuanian interests. He was one of the drafters of the election law to the Constituent Assembly of Lithuania.

At the time, there were very few Lithuanians with a legal education (later, in his memoirs, Skipitis claimed that there were no more than 20). As such, Prime Minister Kazys Grinius invited him to become the Minister of the Interior on 19 June 1920. At the time, the ministry was in charge of numerous areas, including civil administration, local self-government, public security, border protection, infrastructure maintenance and development, social services, taxes, citizenship, health services, etc. All of these areas had to be built and organized in the difficult and chaotic post-war years.

In the 1923 election, Skipitis was elected to the Second Seimas (parliament) as a candidate of the Lithuanian Popular Peasants' Union. In 1925, Santara was reorganized as the Farmers' Party and Skipitis became its chairman and editor of its weekly newspaper Ūkininkų balsas (Voice of Farmers). He was elected in the 1926 elections to the Third Seimas as a candidate of the Farmers' Party. During the 1926 coup d'état, Skipitis and Vaclovas Sidzikauskas mediated between the deposed government and the new regime of Antanas Smetona, taking care to observe constitutional formalities. In the new government of Augustinas Voldemaras, Skipitis was offered the post of Minister of the Interior, but refused. After the coup, Seimas was dissolved in 1927 and the Farmer's Party was banned in 1928.

=== Work with Lithuanians abroad ===
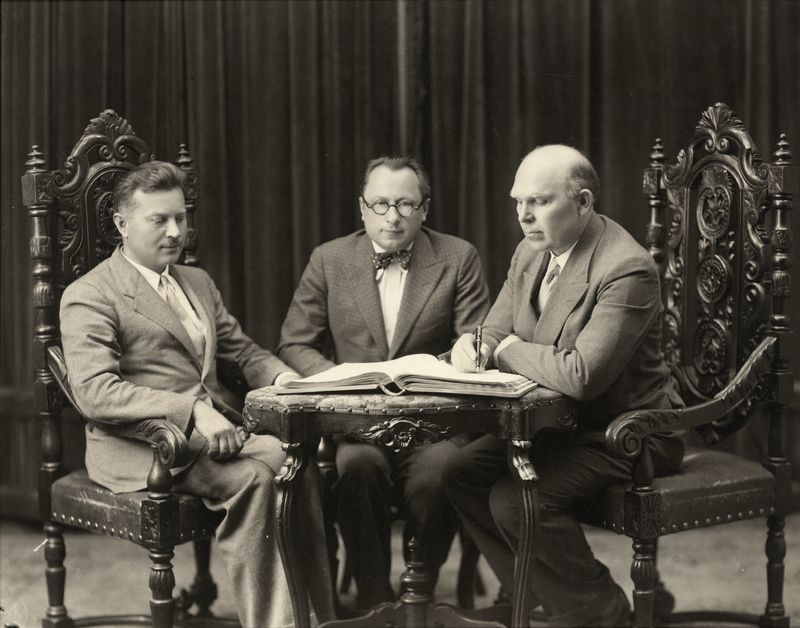
Skipitis (right) with collector Aleksandras Mykolas Račkus (left) who gifted his large numismatic collection to Lithuania during the first Congress of the World Lithuanians in 1935

From 1922, Skipitis had a private attorney practice. From April 1927 to June 1928, he was chairman of the Lithuanian Riflemen's Union. He was also active in other societies such as the Society for the Support of Higher Education Students (Aukštųjų mokyklų lietuviams moksleiviams šelpti draugija), which he chaired in 1927–1928, the Union of Lithuanian Homeowners' Associations (Lietuvos namų savininkų draugijų sąjunga), and the Council of Attorneys, of which he was a member in 1932–1940. In April 1933, Skipitis organized electricity boycott in Kaunas to force the local electricity producer, a monopoly controlled by a Belgian corporation, to lower the prices from up to 1.35 Lt/kWh to 0.82 Lt/kWh. He edited weekly magazine Namų savininkas (Homeowner) in 1937–1940.

In February 1932, he was one of the co-founders of the Society for the Support of Lithuanians Abroad (Draugija užsienio lietuviams remti) and became its chairman. Thousands of Lithuanians had emigrated to United States and South America mostly due to economic reasons. The society sought to encourage the emigrants to maintain their Lithuanian traditions and increase their economic ties with Lithuania by supporting Lithuanian-language schools, libraries, press. The society also wanted to establish a unifying global Lithuanian organization and Skipitis raised an idea to organize the first Lithuanian World Congress. To that end, in early 1935, he visited Lithuanian communities in United States and South America advertising the congress which was held on 11–17 August 1935 in Kaunas. The congress was accompanied by various sport competitions, concerts, exhibitions, etc. Two Lithuanian American basketball players, Konstantinas "Connie" Savickas and Juozas Knašas, remained in Lithuania and trained the fledgling Lithuania men's national basketball team. During the congress, delegates from eight countries established the Union of World's Lithuanians (Pasaulio lietuvių sąjunga), chaired by Skipitis, to develop cultural and economic ties between Lithuania and the communities abroad. The union published, and Skipitis edited, 63 issues of Pasaulio lietuvis magazine (The World's Lithuanian) in 1937–1940. Skipitis visited Lithuanian communities in South America in 1939.

=== World War II and after ===
Skipitis work and activities were interrupted by the Soviet occupation in June 1940. Fearing an arrest by the NKVD, he fled to Nazi Germany in fall 1940. He left his wife and two daughters in Lithuania and they were deported to Siberia during the June deportation. In Berlin, he joined Kazys Škirpa and became one of the co-founders of the Lithuanian Activist Front (LAF) in November 1940. He was appointed chairman of the LAF commission on Lithuanians abroad. In April 1941, when plans were drawn for the June Uprising, Skipitis was reserved the seat of the Minister of Foreign Affairs in the Provisional Government of Lithuania. However, when Germany invaded the Soviet Union in June 1941, the Gestapo did not allow Skipitis to leave Berlin and he never joined the uprising in Lithuania. In July 1941, Skipitis, Ernestas Galvanauskas, and Petras Kalvelis petitioned Škirpa to close LAF in Berlin. Škirpa responded by officially dismissing the three from LAF.

Skipitis continued to be involved with anti-Soviet resistance. In 1942, he briefly and secretly visited Kaunas to discuss creation of a unified resistance organization (such organization, the Supreme Committee for the Liberation of Lithuania or VLIK, was established in November 1943). In July 1943, he delivered a petition to the Reich Ministry for the Occupied Eastern Territories asking to release Lithuanian intellectuals imprisoned at the Stutthof concentration camp as reprisal for the failure to raise a Lithuanian Waffen-SS legion. In May 1944, when the Gestapo arrested most of the leaders of VLIK in Lithuania, it was decided to establish VLIK section in Berlin. Its members were Mykolas Krupavičius, Skipitis, and Vaclovas Sidzikauskas.

In 1946, Skipitis emigrated to United States and settled in Chicago, where he worked as a clerk in a department store. There he continued active public life. He worked at Naujienos newspaper, chaired the Society of Lithuanian Attorneys (Lietuvos teisininkų draugija) in 1949–1955, re-joined VLIK and Lithuanian Riflemen's Union when they moved to United States in 1955 and 1956, respectively. He contributed articles to Lithuanian American press and to the Lithuanian Encyclopedia. He published two volumes of memoirs, Building Independent Lithuania (Nepriklausomą Lietuvą statant, 1961) and Independent Lithuania (Nepriklausoma Lietuva, 1967).

Political offices
Preceded by Eliziejus Draugelis	Minister of the Interior; 1920–1922	Succeeded by Kazimieras Oleka
