= United Minorities =

The United Minorities (Lithuanian: Suvienytos mažumos) was an electoral list representing the Belarusian, German, Jewish and Russian minorities in the May 1923 election to the Second Seimas of interwar Lithuania. The list received 11% of the vote and won ten seats. Seven seats went to the Jewish faction, two to the German faction and one to the Russian faction.

== History ==
In the October 1922 election to the First Seimas, the national minorities fared poorly and gained only four seats (Jews won three seats and Poles won one). The minority groups protested the results and argued that the electoral commission did not properly interpret and apply articles 75 and 76 of the Electoral Law of 27 July 1922. These articles dealt with the method of allocating fractional seats to the parties. The official interpretation favored the large parties. Thus Jewish and Polish parties complained of "stolen" seats and left the First Seimas in protest.

The First Seimas was deadlocked and President Aleksandras Stulginskis called for new elections. Learning from the previous election, the minority groups decided to present a single unified list. Notably, the Central Polish Electoral Committee was excluded from this list. Poles were perceived as anti-Lithuanian due to the ongoing conflict over Vilnius Region with the Second Polish Republic.

== Elected representatives ==
Jewish candidates won seven seats: Isaac Brudni (Zionist Revisionists), Leyb Gorfinkel (Tze'irei Zion), Wolf Sulim (General Zionists), Yosef Shlomo Kahaneman (Agudah), Ozer Finkelstein (Folkspartei), Jacob Robinson (General Zionists), and Simon Rosenbaum (General Zionists).

German candidates won two seats: Rudolf Kinder (Lithuanian German Committee) and August Rogall. Russians won one seat: Evtikhiy Erin.
