= Central Polish Electoral Committee =

The Central Polish Electoral Committee (Lithuanian: Lenkų centrinis rinkimų komitetas, LCRK; Polish: Centralny Polski Komitet Wyborczy, CPKW) was a political party in interwar Lithuania representing the Polish minority. The committee was organized in March 1920 and was the only ethnic minority party to win seats in all four democratic elections to the Seimas.

== History ==
=== Constituent Assembly ===
The Polish Electoral Committee was established in February 1920, but only obtained registration a month later. Three deputies were elected to the Constituent Assembly in 1920 from the list of the Polish Electoral Committee: Adolf Grajewski, Jan Krasowski and Roman Zaremba. The latter two resigned in favour of the priest Bronisław Laus and the worker Antoni Śnielawski in order to make Polish representation more democratic.

On 19 June 1921 Polish deputies prepared the a letter to the League of Nations, in which they voiced their complaints about the mistreatment of the Polish minority in Lithuania: the falsification of election results, the removal of the Polish language from public life, efforts to liquidate Polish private property, etc. The filing of the complaint caused a stir in the Seimas, and at a special meeting on 6 July 1921 Polish deputies were accused of treason and provocation. The leader of the Christian Democrats, priest Mykolas Krupavičius, called the Poles "the lice of our Lithuanian nation". A quarrel ensued, Antoni Śnielewski was beaten, while Jonas Bildušas threw a chair at Laus injuring him. In the absence of a response, Polish deputies did not take part in the work of parliament until the end of the term in protest.

=== First Seimas ===
In August 1922 the Central Polish Electoral Committee (CPKW) was established, headed by Eugeniusz Romer and Kazimierz Janczewski. There was also a second Polish electoral list put up by Polish workers' and peasants' activists. Both lists won 54,000 votes and six seats in the October 1922 elections. However, due to a change in electoral law made after the elections, four seats were taken away from the Poles. As a result, only Laus from the CPKW and Kazimierz Wołkowycki from the Workers' List entered the First Seimas. However, in protest Polish deputies did not take part in the proceedings. The only session they attended was the last one, at which the government of Ernestas Galvanauskas collapsed.

=== Second Seimas ===
Before the next elections in May 1923 Laus was arrested and exiled to the Biržai district; he was allowed to return to Kaunas only after the elections. He was also banned from running for the Seimas by Bishop Pranciškus Karevičius. The CPKW won three seats, held by Wiktor Budzyński, Bolesław Lutyk and Wincenty Rumpel. Together with workers' representative Kazimierz Wołkowycki, they formed the Polish faction, which often cooperated with German and Jewish deputies. After the new government was formed in 1924, Polish deputies were removed from committee work.

=== Third Seimas ===
The atmosphere before the May 1926 elections was extremely tense, with Polish pre-election meetings being broken up and Polish candidates being beaten by Lithuanian militias. The CPKW won three seats, held by Wiktor Budzyński, Bolesław Lutyk and Jan Bucewicz. Together with workers' representative Tomasz Giżyński, they again formed the Polish faction.

The Polish faction supported the leftist government of Mykolas Sleževičius, who in return for its support promised concessions and greater freedoms for the Polish minority. The concessions to the Polish population, above all the reopening of Polish schools, enraged the opposition. It was, however, one of the causes of the December 1926 coup d'état that brought President Antanas Smetona to power. Despite this, CPKW deputies supported Smetona's election as president. However, in April 1927 they supported the opposition's motion for a vote of no confidence in the new government which led to the dissolution of the Third Seimas.

== Election results ==
Election	Votes	%	Seats	+/–	Status
1920	29,156	4.3%	3 / 112	Steady	Opposition
1922	32,849	4.05%	1 / 78	▼2	Opposition
1923	50,064	5.55%	3 / 78	▲2	Opposition
1926	31,349	3.08%	3 / 85	Steady	Support
Source: Lietuvos statistikos metraštis 1924–1926, Nohlen & Stöver

== Elected members of the Seimas ==
Lithuanian name	Polish name	Year elected			
Lithuanian name	Polish name	1920	1922	1923	1926
Janas Bucevičius	Jan Bucewicz				1926
Viktoras Budzinskis	Wiktor Budzyński			1923	1926
Adolfas Grajevskis	Adolf Grajewski	1920			
Bronislavas Liausas	Bronisław Laus	1920	1922		
Boleslavas Liutikas	Bolesław Lutyk			1923	1926
Vincentas Rumpelis	Wincenty Rumpel			1923	
Antanas Šnielevskis	Antoni Śnielawski	1920			

== Bibliography ==
- Buchowski, Krzysztof (1999). Polacy w niepodległym państwie litewskim 1918-1940 (in Polish).
- Ragauskas, Aivas; Tamošaitis, Mindaugas, eds. (2006). Lietuvos Steigiamojo Seimo (1920–1922 metų) narių biografinis žodynas. Didysis Lietuvos parlamentarų biografinis žodynas (in Lithuanian). Vol. 2. Vilnius: Vilniaus pedagoginis universitetas. ISBN 9789955201465.
- Ragauskas, Aivas; Tamošaitis, Mindaugas, eds. (2007). Lietuvos Respublikos Seimų I (1922–1923), II (1923–1926), III (1926–1927), IV (1936–1940) narių biografinis žodynas. Didysis Lietuvos parlamentarų biografinis žodynas (in Lithuanian). Vol. 3. Vilniaus pedagoginis universitetas. ISBN 978-9955-20-345-2.
