= Economic and Political Union of Lithuanian Farmers =

The Economic and Political Union of Lithuanian Farmers (Lithuanian: Ekonominė ir politinė Lietuvos žemdirbių sąjunga or simply Žemdirbiai) was a political party in interwar Lithuania. Publisher Saliamonas Banaitis was the union's ideological leader. The union represented interests of larger landowners and opposed the 1922 land reform in Lithuania. The union fared poorly in the 1920–1923 Lithuanian parliamentary elections gaining less than 1.2% of the votes. Established in April 1919, it merged with the Party of National Progress in August 1924 to form the Lithuanian Nationalist Union but continued to formally exist until 1931.

== Establishment and leadership ==
The union's founding meeting took place on 28 April 1919. The founding meeting took place in the apartment of Saliamonas Banaitis and was attended by Juozas Kavoliūnas and Jonas Smilgevičius as well as 12 others from Marijampolė, Tauragė, and Garliava. The union was initiated by Banaitis, publisher and businessman. He was the union's ideological leader but officially was only its vice-chairman. He was expelled from the Lithuanian Christian Democratic Party for establishing the union. The union was considered to be a defector from the Christian Democrats.

In December 1919, the party's board included chairman Jonas Gavėnas, vice-chairman Juozas Kavoliūnas, secretary Aleksandras Žilinskas, and members Juozas Skinkys, Saliamonas Banaitis, and Jonas Jakimavičius. Three board members were also members of the Council of Lithuania. In total, the union had four members in the Council of Lithuania. Later, physician Rokas Šliūpas was the chairman. However, the union did not have stronger leaders.

Several members of the Lithuanian nobility joined the union including Jurgis Pliateris from Švėkšna, Aleksandras Tiškevičius III from Kretinga, Jurgis Gruževskis from Kuršėnai.

== Activities ==
According to memoirs of Adomas Prūsas, in early 1919, Banaitis planned a coup to overthrow the government of Lithuania. The coup was to be carried out by the union and some units of the Lithuanian Army. The union was most active in 1921–1922 when it organized numerous local chapters, meetings, and discussions.

In March 1922, the union organized a committee to provide aid to Lithuanians suffering from the Russian famine of 1921–1922. The committee was chaired by Sofija Smetonienė. It collected 6,000 poods of grain and delivered it to descendants of the participants of the Uprising of 1863 that were deported to the Saratov Governorate.

The union diminished significantly after the electoral failure in the May 1923 election. Its local chapters started closing down. In August 1924, the union merged with the Party of National Progress to form the Lithuanian Nationalist Union which was the ruling party in Lithuania from 1926 to 1940. The union continued to formally exist until 2 May 1931.

=== Elections ===
Seimas election results
Election	Votes	%	Seats	+/–
April 1920	7,651	1.12	0 / 112	Steady
October 1922	9,425	1.16	0 / 78	Steady
May 1923	8,014	0.89	0 / 78	Steady
Source: Lietuvos statistikos metraštis 1924–1926

The union fared poorly in the 1920–1923 Lithuanian parliamentary elections gaining less than 1.2% of the votes. No members of the union were elected. However, in August 1922, four members of the Constituent Assembly of Lithuania defected from the Farmers' Association and formed a fraction of the Union of Lithuanian Farmers. These members were Jonas Valickas, Antanas Šilgalis, Jurgis Marčiulionis, and Klemensas Vaitiekūnas.

In the October 1922 election to the First Seimas, the union agreed to present a single electoral list with the Party of National Progress. However, board member Vladas Kriaučiūnas presented separate lists in the Marijampolė and Telšiai electoral districts.

The Catholic newspaper Tėvynės sargas blamed the 27,000 votes that the union and the Party of National Progress received for preventing the Lithuanian Christian Democratic Party from gaining a majority which led to the deadlocked legislature. New elections were called for May 1923. The Christian Democrats and the Farmers' Association changed tactics. While merger with the union was again rejected, it was decided to cooperate at the local level and concentrate the agitation against the main opponent, the Lithuanian Popular Peasants' Union. The Farmers' Union was divided internally – some members agreed to join the Farmers' Association, while others continued to ally with the Party of National Progress or present independent lists.

=== Congresses ===
The party held congresses on:

- 19–20 January 1920 in Kaunas attended by about 100 people. By that time, the party had 27 chapters.
- 17 July 1921 in Vilkaviškis attended by about 300 people
- 28–29 November 1921 attended by 126 representatives from 57 local chapters (out 80 total registered chapters)
- 20–21 January 1922 attended by about 500 people
- 18 December 1922
- 15–16 February 1923

== Relationship with the Farmers' Association ==
Since the union was similar in its goals of improving farmers' economic conditions to the Farmers' Association, the two organizations contemplated a merger but it was rejected in June 1919. The association criticized the Union of Lithuanian Farmers for mixing politics with business. The issue of merging three farmers' organizations (the Union of Lithuanian Farmers, Farmers' Association, and Peasant Union) was discussed in January 1922.

The Farmers' Union and the Farmers' Association held negotiations in July 1922. They were able to reach compromise on some key areas, including the issue of the land reform, but the association was interested only in a temporary alliance in the upcoming October 1922 election to the First Seimas. After the election, the union agreed to the merger, but the association rejected it.

Some local chapters would switch between the Farmers' Union and the Farmers' Association. For example, in November 1921, Ramygala chapter with 100 members defected to the union, while Daukšai chapter defected to the association.

== Platform ==
The union considered farmers to be the basis of national prosperity and, therefore, farmers should have the leading role in Lithuania's politics. The union had ambitions of representing farmers, the largest segment of the Lithuanian society, and becoming a major political party. The union based its platform on the principles of nationalism and Catholic faith. Banaitis opposed divisions and conflicts between the social classes.

The union opposed the 1922 land reform in Lithuania which nationalized land owned by manor owners and distributed it to small farmers. It compared the land reform to Bolshevism. While the union agreed with the general principle of the land reform, it believed that it should be implemented with less haste as destruction of large farms would lead to economic disruption and higher taxes for small farmers. The government should nationalize neglected land and distribute it only to those who owned proper tools and equipment. The union supported the inviolability of private property, demanded fair compensation for the nationalized property, and advocated for the removal of restrictions on selling land. The union also called for prohibition of lumber exports, elimination of requisitions, availability of low-interest loans, reduction of costs for agricultural transport via the railroad.

The union criticized the Constituent Assembly of Lithuania as ineffective and called for its dissolution. For example, it criticized the assembly for delaying the introduction of the Lithuanian litas, the national currency, and for budget deficit of 25%. The union drafted its program which included constitutional articles. For example, it called for a democratic republic and a president elected for a five-year term. The union opposed the separation of church and state.

Contemporaries criticized the party as representing interest of wealthy farmers, large landowners, and manor owners (Lithuanian nobility). Its leaders were criticized as city dwellers removed from agricultural work. The party was also criticized for being to dependent on the Party of National Progress. Mykolas Krupavičius, one of the leaders of the Lithuanian Christian Democratic Party and authors of the land reform, called the union "godless".

== Žemdirbių balsas ==
On 7 October 1919, the union published the first issue of its weekly newspaper Žemdirbių balsas (Farmers' Voice) which was edited by Banaitis. The newspaper promoted the union in the Lithuanian elections, criticized the government (particularly the law on local self-governance), promoted economic issues relevant to the farmers (for example, encouraged linen production, opposed linen monopoly, advocated for a farmers' bank).

After the April 1920 election, the newspaper was discontinued on 14 May 1920. It was briefly relaunched between 1 January and 22 February 1921. It was published again from January 1922 to 5 February 1923.

== Bibliography ==
- Baršys, Povilas (2015). Vasario 16-osios Akto signataras Saliamonas Banaitis. Iš Lietuvos nacionalinio muziejaus archyvo (in Lithuanian). Vol. 13. Vilnius: Lietuvos nacionalinis muziejus. ISBN 978-609-8039-63-4. ISSN 1648-2859.
- Grigaravičius, Algirdas (2006). "Lietuvos žemdirbių sąjunga – ūkininkų interesų gynėja" (PDF). Kultūros barai (in Lithuanian). 7–8/9: 51–56, 78–84. ISSN 0134-3106.
- Grigaravičius, Algirdas (2012). "Visa prezidento kariauna" (PDF). Kultūros barai (in Lithuanian) (11): 105–108. ISSN 0134-3106.
- Kasperavičius, Algis Povilas (2015). "Agrarinės reformos procesas nepriklausomoje Lietuvoje ir jos visuomenė". Lietuvos istorijos studijos (in Lithuanian). 36: 47–68. ISSN 1392-0448.
- Lietuvos statistikos metraštis 1924–1926 m. (in Lithuanian). Vol. I. Kaunas: Valstybės spaustuvė. 1927.
- Maksimaitis, Mindaugas (2009). "Politiniai ir teisiniai veiksniai, lėmę ankstyvą Lietuvos tarybos pasitraukimą iš politinės arenos". Jurisprudencija (in Lithuanian). 4 (118): 7–20. ISSN 2029-2058.
- Tamošaitis, Mindaugas (2006). "Seimo veiksnys Vinco Krėvės-Mickevičiaus ir Lietuvių tautininkų sąjungos santykiuose (1920–1926 m.)". Parlamento studijos (in Lithuanian). 7: 29–52. ISSN 1822-749X.
