= Petrograd Seimas =

1917 conference of Lithuanian politicians

Petrograd Seimas (Lithuanian: Rusijos lietuvių seimas Petrograde or Visos Rusijos lietuvių seimas) was a conference of Lithuanian activists in Petrograd, Russian Republic, held on 9–16 June [O.S. 27 May – 3 June] 1917 to discuss the political future of Lithuania. Citing the right of self-determination, the delegates discussed whether Lithuania should seek autonomy or full independence. While it failed to unite Lithuanian activists, it helped to crystallize ideas on Lithuania's independence.

The February Revolution brought political freedoms and Lithuanians hurried to organize their political parties. There was a need to organize an authoritative political body that could represent all Lithuanians and work towards obtaining autonomy or full independence from Russia. Representatives of five Lithuanian parties established the Council of the Lithuanian Nation (Lietuvių tautos taryba) in February 1917. To boost its authority and recognition, the council called the Petrograd Seimas attended by 334 deputies. There were passionate disagreements between the political right (Party of National Progress, Lithuanian Christian Democratic Party) and left (Popular Union of Lithuanian Socialists, Social Democratic Party of Lithuania) both on procedural questions and fundamental issues. The left advocated for autonomy within Russia while the right advocated for full independence. When the right won by a narrow margin of votes, the socialists withdrew in protest.

Such splintering of the Lithuanian movement brought an end to the Council of the Lithuanian Nation and Lithuanians were unable to gain any kind of recognition or acknowledgement from the Russian Provisional Government before it was toppled in the October Revolution. Political initiative was taken over by Lithuanians in German-occupied Lithuania when they organized Vilnius Conference and elected the Council of Lithuania in September 1917.

== Council of the Lithuanian Nation ==
=== Background ===
Lithuania was occupied by Germany when Russian Imperial Army abandoned the territory during the Great Retreat in September 1915. As many as 200,000 Lithuanians, including activists and intellectuals, evacuated deeper into Russia. The Tsarist regime limited political activities and Lithuanians did not have a political center in Russia. After the February Revolution, restrictions on political activities were lifted.

=== Small Seimas of Petrograd ===
In January 1917, a meeting of Moscow Lithuanians and Lithuanian representatives in the Russian State Duma delegated Stasys Šilingas to organize an authoritative body that could represent all Lithuanians and their political aspirations. On 24 February [O.S. 11 February] 1917, representatives of five Lithuanian parties gathered to the so-called Small Seimas of Petrograd. Each party sent ten representatives, ten others were independents, and another ten were guests. The parties were Social Democratic Party of Lithuania, Lithuanian Christian Democratic Party, Democratic National Freedom League (known as Santara), Popular Union of Lithuanian Socialists (Lietuvos socialistų liaudininkų sąjunga), and National Union of Lithuanian Catholics (Lietuvių katalikų tautos sąjunga).

The gathering decided to establish the Council of the Lithuanian Nation (Lietuvių tautos taryba). Each party was to send three representatives to the council. The National Union of Lithuanian Catholics was not recognized as a party, but the Party of National Progress was. The council elected a six-member presidium: chairman Stasys Šilingas, first vice-chairman Vaclovas Bielskis, second vice-chairman Kazimieras Rėklaitis, secretary Liudas Noreika, second secretary Antanas Tumėnas, treasurer Gabrielius Liutkevičius. At the same time, the council adopted a declaration that Lithuania was a separate ethnic, cultural, and political entity that should be granted autonomy. The plan was to read the declaration at the Russian State Duma, but it was not reconvened and the declaration was not made public.

=== Temporary Committee for Governing Lithuania ===
The council convened again on 26 March [O.S. 13 March] 1917 and established the 12-member Temporary Committee for Governing Lithuania (Laikinasis Lietuvos valdymo komitetas). Two seats were reserved for each of six political parties. Another 12 seats were reserved for national minorities (six for Belarusians, three for Jews, two for Poles, and one for Russians).

The Temporary Committee declared its intentions to take over evacuated Lithuanian institutions, govern Vilna and Kovno Governorates, organize the return of war refugees, foster economic recovery of war-torn Lithuania, demand war reparations, prepare elections to the Constituent Assembly. In essence, the Temporary Committee was supposed to be an embryo of a Lithuanian provisional government.

This plan was presented to Duke Georgy Lvov, Prime Minister of the Russian Provisional Government, and was published in the official publication Laws (Законы). A delegation visited the Petrograd Soviet which expressed its support to the principle of self-determination and promised to support the Lithuanian cause. Another declaration was presented to Fyodor Kokoshkin who was organizing the Russian Constituent Assembly, but Russian politicians did not respond.

== Petrograd Seimas ==
=== Electing deputies and leaders ===
Deputies at the Seimas by affiliation
Party	Reps
Popular Union of Lithuanian Socialists	90
Lithuanian Christian Democratic Party	41
Social Democratic Party of Lithuania	39
National Union of Lithuanian Catholics	32
Democratic National Freedom League	30
Party of National Progress	20
Independents	51

On 27 March [O.S. 14 March] 1917, the Council of the Lithuanian Nation decided to organize the Petrograd Seimas hoping that it would boost its authority and recognition. The deputies were not appointed but elected in local elections that were organized in 42 cities in Russia free of German forces. The deputies could be elected by all Lithuanians over 18 years of age. One deputy represented 200 people. In total, 334 deputies arrived to Petrograd but only 320 were recognized as properly elected. Among elected deputies, there were a couple Bolsheviks who read a statement and withdrew from the conference.

From the very beginning, there were major disagreements between the various parties. Election of the Seimas' presidium took two and a half days. After disagreements, the Popular Union of Lithuanian Socialists withdrew from the proceedings and the first presidium was elected without its deputies. Lithuanian soldiers – they organized a congress at the same time to establish the Union of Lithuanian Soldiers (Lietuvių karių sąjunga) – intervened, dismissed the first presidium, and brought back the socialists. The second presidium was elected from representatives of five parties (the National Union of Lithuanian Catholics was excluded). Socialist Vaclovas Bielskis was elected chairman.

=== Independence or autonomy ===
Even more heated discussions followed. The deputies could not agree on the future of Lithuania – should it seek autonomy within Russia or full independence? The full independence was supported by the right wing – the Party of National Progress (Augustinas Voldemaras, Martynas Yčas) and Christian Democrats (Mykolas Krupavičius, Juozas Vailokaitis, Petras Karvelis). Socialists (Mykolas Sleževičius) and members of the Democratic National Freedom League (Petras Leonas, Stasys Šilingas) supported autonomy. Seven draft resolutions were prepared and then consolidated into two.

In the end, the resolution calling for full independence won by a narrow margin (140 votes for, 128 votes against, and four abstentions). The resolution explicitly called for an independent Lithuania organized on democratic principles that would guarantee equal rights regardless of nationality, sex, or religion. The other resolution received 132 votes in favor. It did not explicitly call for either independence or autonomy, leaving the issue to the future Constituent Assembly, but emphasized the right of self-determination and planned to petition Russian and other democratic governments to gain recognition of such right. Both resolutions agreed that Lithuania's future was not an internal Russian issue, but an international question that should be addressed at the future peace conference where Lithuania should be fully represented.

The socialists did not accept the vote and left the Seimas. Separately, they adopted their own resolution and presented it to the First All-Russian Congress of Soviets of Workers' and Soldiers' Deputies which convened on 16 June.

== Aftermath and evaluation ==
Due to the disagreements and inability to adopt a common resolution, the Council of the Lithuanian Nation splintered and became inactive. Its last meeting took place on 29 June [O.S.]. However, fundamentally, both sides sought the same – freedom for Lithuania – and disagreed only on what course of action was more realistic and politically prudent. Socialists later argued that they did not oppose independence and that their position was just a tactic to tread carefully and keep the options open in the uncertain times of war and revolutions. Nevertheless, attempts at creating a political center failed and Lithuanians were unable to gain any kind of recognition or acknowledgement from the Russian Provisional Government. Lithuanians in Russia did not establish another political center until the Supreme Lithuanian Council in Russia was convened in November 1917.

== See also ==
- Lithuanian conferences during World War I for conferences in Sweden and Switzerland

== Bibliography ==
- Balkelis, Tomas (2016). "Forging a "Moral Community": The Great War and Lithuanian Refugees in Russia". In Balkelis, Tomas; Davoliūtė, Violeta (eds.). Population Displacement in Lithuania in the Twentieth Century: Experiences, Identities and Legacies. BRILL Rodopi. ISBN 978-90-04-31410-8.
- Blažytė-Baužienė, Danutė; Gimžauskas, Edmundas; Laurinavičius, Česlovas; Mačiulis, Dangiras; Rudis, Gediminas; Svarauskas, Artūras; Vaičenonis, Jonas (2014). Laurinavičius, Česlovas (ed.). Lietuvos istorija. Nepriklausomybė (1918–1940 m.) (in Lithuanian). Vol. X, part I. Vilnius: Baltos lankos. ISBN 978-9955-584-91-9.
- Čepėnas, Pranas (1986). Naujųjų laikų Lietuvos istorija. Vol. II. Chicago: Dr. Kazio Griniaus Fondas. OCLC 3220435.
- Grigaravičius, Algirdas (2013). "Politinė lietuvių veikla Rusijoje 1917 metais". Darbai ir dienos (in Lithuanian). 60: 23–72. doi:10.7220/2335-8769.60.2. ISSN 1392-0588.
- Lasinskas, Povilas (8 December 2011). "Rusijos lietuvių seimas Petrograde". Visuotinė lietuvių enciklopedija (in Lithuanian). Mokslo ir enciklopedijų leidybos centras.
- Merkelis, Aleksandras (1989) [1934]. Juozas Tumas Vaižgantas (in Lithuanian) (3rd ed.). Vilnius: Vaga. ISBN 5-415-00658-3.
- Perrin, Charles (2016). "Eating bread with tears: Martynas Jankus and the deportation of East Prussian civilians to Russia during World War I". Journal of Baltic Studies. 3 (48): 363–380. doi:10.1080/01629778.2016.1178655. ISSN 1751-7877.
- Sperskienė, Rasa (30 May 2017). "Lietuvių tautos taryba". Lietuviškos partijos ir organizacijos Rusijoje 1917–1918 metais (in Lithuanian). Wroblewski Library of the Lithuanian Academy of Sciences.
