= Liudas Adomauskas =

Lithuanian politician (1880–1941)

- Born: 8 April 1880; Notėnai, Russian Empire
- Died: 16 August 1941 (aged 61); Paneriai, Generalbezirk Litauen
- Cause of death: Ponary massacre
- Education: Kaunas Priest Seminary
- Occupations: Catholic priest, communist activist
- Political party: Communist Party of Lithuania

Liudas Adomauskas (8 April 1880 – 16 August 1941) was a Lithuanian Roman Catholic priest turned communist activist and politician.

Ordained priest in 1903, he became a socialist sympathizer during the Russian Revolution of 1905. He renounced his priesthood in 1921 and joined the Communist Party of Lithuania. However, he was soon arrested, and released in 1934. After the Soviet occupation of Lithuania in June 1940, he joined the new communist government becoming chairman of the People's Seimas, People's Commissar of State Control, and judge of the Supreme Court of the Lithuanian SSR. After the German Nazi occupation of Lithuania, he was executed in the Ponary massacre.

== Biography ==
=== Russian Empire ===
Adomauskas was born on 8 April 1880 in Notėnai near Salantai, then part of the Russian Empire. In 1898–1903, he studied at the Kaunas Priest Seminary. He was ordained in 1903. In 1903–1914, he served as a vicar in various towns in Lithuania (Kelmė, Rietavas, Raguva, Tryškiai, Anykščiai). In 1914, at the outbreak of World War I, he became a chaplain in the Imperial Russian Army. He returned to Lithuania in May 1918, and served as a vicar in Palonai until he renounced priesthood in 1921.

=== Interwar Lithuania ===
In 1922, influenced by socialist ideas since the Russian Revolution of 1905, he joined the Communist Party of Lithuania which was outlawed in interwar Lithuania. He became the editor of the legal communist newspapers Žarija and Naujoji gadynė. The same year, he published the anti-religious book Šventraščio paslaptys (Secrets of Scripture). In October 1922, he was a candidate of the Workers' Group of Lithuania (a front for the communists) in the Lithuanian parliamentary election to the First Seimas.

He was imprisoned for communist activities in 1923 and after the 1926 Lithuanian coup d'état was sentenced to death. His sentence was commuted to 15 years in prison and he received an amnesty which halved his sentence in 1928. He was eventually released in 1934. Until 1940, he lived with his brother priest Stanislovas Adomauskas in Plateliai.

=== World War II ===
Adomauskas actively supported the Soviet annexation of Lithuania in 1940. He became state comptroller in the People's Government of Lithuania on 17 June, was elected Chairman of the People's Seimas on 21 July, and was a member of the 20-person delegation sent to Moscow to request incorporation of the newly proclaimed Lithuanian SSR into the Soviet Union. On 25 August 1940, he was appointed the People's Commissar of State Control of the Lithuanian SSR. In February 1941, he joined the Communist Party of the Soviet Union and soon after became a judge of the Supreme Court of the Lithuanian SSR.

After the German Nazi occupation of Lithuania, Adomauskas was captured and executed on 16 August 1941, in the Ponary massacre. He was later buried in the cemetery of the Paneriai Memorial.

== Legacy ==
In 1949, a collective farm was established in Notėnai village which was named in honour of Liudas Adomauskas until in its removal in the late 1980s. The biography of Adomauskas was published in 1960.
