= 1926 Lithuanian parliamentary election =

- 8–10 May 1926
- All 85 seats in the Seimas; 43 seats needed for a majority
Party	Leader	Vote %	Seats	+/–
LVLS	Kazys Grinius	22.20	22	+6
LSDP	Steponas Kairys	17.03	15	+7
LKDP	Mykolas Krupavičius	12.59	14	−3
Farmers' Association	Eliziejus Draugelis	11.19	11	−3
Labour Federation	Pranas Radzevičius	7.80	5	−7
ŽDS		4.63	3	New
LTS	Antanas Smetona	4.31	3	New
LCRK	Kazimierz Janczewski	3.08	3	−1
LDAUP		2.41	1	New
MLP	George Waschkies	2.06	6	New
Farmers' Party	Rapolas Skipitis	1.84	2	New
This lists parties that won seats. See the complete results below.
Results by constituency.
Prime Minister before	Prime Minister after election
Leonas Bistras; LKDP-LDF-ŪS	Mykolas Sleževičius; LVLS-LSDP

Parliamentary elections were held in Lithuania between 8 and 10 May 1926. The Lithuanian Popular Peasants' Union remained the largest party, winning 24 of the 85 seats in the third Seimas. They formed a left-wing coalition government with the Social Democratic Party of Lithuania, which was overthrown in a military coup in December. The Seimas was disbanded in 1927 and Lithuanian Nationalist Union leader Antanas Smetona was appointed President.

== Results ==
Graph of the party split among 85 seats.
Party	Votes	%	Seats	+/–
Lithuanian Popular Peasants' Union	225,797	22.20	22	+6
Social Democratic Party	173,250	17.03	15	+7
Lithuanian Christian Democratic Party	128,126	12.59	14	0
Farmers' Association	113,819	11.19	11	–3
Labour Federation	79,315	7.80	5	–7
Democratic Jewish Union	47,142	4.63	3	New
Lithuanian Nationalist Union	43,841	4.31	3	New
Central Polish Electoral Committee	31,349	3.08	3	–1
Party of Polish Workers, Artisans and Farmers	24,473	2.41	1	New
Memel Agricultural Party	20,944	2.06	6	New
Farmers' Party	18,741	1.84	2	+2
Memel People's Party	18,496	1.82	0	New
Jewish Economic and Religious Party	16,702	1.64	0	New
German Evangelical Party	9,658	0.95	0	New
Party of Russians and Belarusians	8,022	0.79	0	0
Memel Workers' Party	3,000	0.29	0	New
Union of Latvians in Lithuania	2,358	0.23	0	New
Party of Catholics and Abstainers	2,343	0.23	0	New
Company of House and Land Owners	2,235	0.22	0	New
Union of Russian Democrats	1,617	0.16	0	New
Union of Evangelical Lutherans	1,340	0.13	0	New
Party of Public Servants of Klaipėda	1,158	0.11	0	New
Party for an Autonomous Klaipėda	937	0.09	0	New
Party of Samogitian Women	828	0.08	0	New
Poles of Jonava	431	0.04	0	New
German Evangelicals of Marijampolė	404	0.04	0	New
Party of Polish Farmers and Workers	256	0.03	0	New
Party of Polish Workers	253	0.02	0	0
Lithuanian National Organisation in Kedainiai	230	0.02	0	New
Party of Evangelical Lithuanians	203	0.02	0	New
Catholic Nationalists	169	0.02	0	New
Polish Party "For Creed and Homeland"	149	0.01	0	New
Polish Catholic Party	116	0.01	0	0
Tenants' Party	94	0.01	0	New
Party of Public Servants	71	0.01	0	New
Workers groups (6)	20,074	1.97	0	0
Poor peasants and small farmers groups	19,352	1.90	0	0
Total	1,017,293	100.00	85	+7
Valid votes	1,017,293	99.79		
Invalid/blank votes	2,178	0.21		
Total votes	1,019,471	100.00		
Registered voters/turnout	1,179,538	86.43		
Source: Nohlen & Stöver, Ragauskas & Tamošaitis, Lietuvos statistikos metraštis (without seats)

=== Results by constituency ===
Party	I	II	III	IV	V	VI	X
Popular Peasants' Union	26.1	17.5	26.3	30.6	19.5	26.1	1.6
Social Democratic Party	15.0	19.3	20.3	15.7	20.0	15.0	13.3
Christian Democratic Party	13.8	9.3	12.3	15.9	14.1	15.9	—N/a
Farmers' Association	16.4	8.5	12.7	15.0	10.7	11.2	—N/a
Labour Federation	8.1	7.7	7.0	10.6	9.8	6.3	1.0
Democratic Jewish Union	5.7	6.2	4.8	4.1	4.3	4.5	—N/a
Nationalist Union	—N/a	7.7	1.9	12.3	4.7	—N/a	—N/a
LCRK/CPKW	4.5	4.0	5.2	0.5	1.8	3.6	—N/a
LDAŪ	—N/a	6.6	—N/a	—N/a	1.3	5.4	—N/a
Memel Agricultural Party	—N/a	—N/a	—N/a	—N/a	—N/a	—N/a	35.6
Farmers' Party	4.8	1.7	0.3	2.4	2.7	0.5	—N/a
Memel People's Party	—N/a	—N/a	—N/a	—N/a	—N/a	—N/a	31.4
ŽETS	1.3	2.6	1.6	2.1	1.8	1.2	—N/a
German Evangelical Party	1.3	3.1	1.3	0.2	—N/a	—N/a	—N/a
Source: Lietuvos statistikos metraštis

=== Result analysis ===
For the first time since the 1920 election, Christian Democrats did not win a majority. The loss is variously explained. Party leader Mykolas Krupavičius blamed political ignorance of the public, political agitation by the opposition that went "beyond any limits of decency," and financial crisis. Stasys Šalkauskis stated that, during the six years in power, the opposition united against the Christian Democrats. Historian Algimantas Kasparavičius listed the following reasons for the decline of Christian Democrats:

- Inability to resolve the conflict over Vilnius Region with the Second Polish Republic
- Diplomatic conflict with the Holy See after the Concordat of 1925 with Poland
- Internal disagreements within the party, particularly regarding the foreign policy
- Intrigues and interference of the Soviet Union and the Communist Party of Lithuania
- Attempts at restricting democratic freedoms by administrative means
- Involvement of the Catholic Church in politics
- Policies against national minorities and opposition
- Economic difficulties and lack of foreign investments
- Difficulties implementing the 1922 Land Reform in Lithuania
- Corruption scandals (e.g. Juozas Purickis, Vytautas Petrulis)
- Changes in the electorate due to the incorporation of Klaipėda Region (the region was primarily Lutheran)
