= Supreme Lithuanian Council in Russia =

The Supreme Lithuanian Council in Russia (Lithuanian: Vyriausioji lietuvių taryba Rusijoje) was a short-lived Lithuanian organization in Voronezh, Russia during the Russian Revolution. It was established in December 1917 and ceased activities in spring 1918.

The council claimed to represent Lithuania at various Russian institutions as well as abroad. It worked to organize Lithuanian war refugee return to Lithuania and issued passports, though they were not recognized. It also delegated Augustinas Voldemaras to establish contacts with the Ukrainian People's Republic and represent Lithuania at the negotiations of the Treaty of Brest-Litovsk. In February 1918, seven members of the council were arrested by the Bolsheviks and held in prison for about a month. The council was officially abolished on 19 April 1918 by the order signed by Joseph Stalin and Vincas Kapsukas.

== Establishment ==
Lithuania was occupied by Germany when Russian Imperial Army abandoned the territory during the Great Retreat in September 1915. As many as 200,000 Lithuanians, including activists and intellectuals, evacuated deeper into Russia. The Tsarist regime limited political activities and Lithuanians did not have a political center in Russia. After the February Revolution, restrictions on political activities were lifted. Lithuanians decided to establish the Council of the Lithuanian Nation (Lietuvių tautos taryba) meant to represent all Lithuanians and their political aspirations. The council organized the Petrograd Seimas on 9–16 June [O.S. 27 May – 3 June] 1917. However, the Seimas broke down due to disagreements whether Lithuania should seek autonomy within Russia or full independence and the Council of the Lithuanian Nation became inactive.

The need for an authoritative Lithuanian institution remained. Therefore, urged by the Union of Lithuanian Soldiers, Jonas Jablonskis, Kazys Grinius, and Pranas Mašiotas organized a gathering of Lithuanian political parties in Voronezh on 15–18 November 1917. The gathering was delayed because activists wanted to hear the results of the Stockholm conference of 18–20 October. The gathering was attended by representatives from the Lithuanian Christian Democratic Party, Lithuanian Popular Socialist Democratic Party, Democratic National Freedom League (Santara), Party of National Progress, National Union of Lithuanian Catholics, and Union of Lithuanian Soldiers. Socialist and social democratic parties refused to attend. The gathering established the Supreme Lithuanian Council in Russia and elected its chairman. The council officially began its activities on 1 December 1917.

== Activities ==
The Supreme Lithuanian Council in Russia organized chapters in other cities, including Kyiv and Petrograd. The main activity of the council was to organize the return of Lithuanian war refugees, soldiers, and evacuated property to Lithuania. It issued passports in Lithuanian, Russian, and German though Russian authorities refused to recognize them. In February 1918, the council delegated soldiers Jonas Variakojis and Kazys Škirpa near the front lines to investigate the situation of Lithuanian refugees. Attorneys Petras Leonas, Konstantinas Jablonskis, and Tadas Petkevičius formed a committee to draft plans for Lithuania's governance and municipalities.

The council claimed to represent Lithuania at various Russian institutions as well as abroad. Since the Ukrainian People's Republic had already declared its independence, the council sent its delegates Augustinas Voldemaras and Rapolas Skipitis to Kyiv in December 1918. Lithuanians hoped that Ukraine would support them in the upcoming negotiations of the Treaty of Brest-Litovsk. The council further delegated Voldemaras to represent Lithuania at Brest-Litovsk negotiations. Voldemaras participated in the negotiations as an advisor to the Ukrainian delegation. On 15 March 1918, the Petrograd section of the council issued a proclamation protesting that Lithuanian affairs were not addressed in the treaty.

On 16–20 January 1918, the council organized another Seimas in Petrograd. It elected additional four members to the council. On 1 February 1918, the council issued a proclamation in Russian and Lithuanian addressed to all countries. It contained nine demands, including recognition of independent Lithuania which would include Lithuania Minor, recognition of the Council of Lithuania as a temporary governing institution until the election of the Constituent Assembly of Lithuania, representation of Lithuania at peace negotiations, withdrawal of Russian and German armies from Lithuania, payment of war reparations, etc.

== Liquidation ==
In February 1918, seven council members, painter Adomas Varnas, and Liudas Daukša (he worked as council's accountant) were arrested by the Bolsheviks based on orders from the Lithuanian Commissariat (a section of the People's Commissariat for Nationalities). Additionally, the Bolsheviks arrested six students, members of the Ateitis federation, who protested these arrests. They were held in Voronezh prison for about a month. According to his relatives, Jonas Yčas freed them by taking 13,000 rubles from the gymnasium he worked at and bribing police officials. Their release was also requested by the German representative in Russia (Germans were asked to intervene by the Council of Lithuania).

After their release, the activists attempted to move the council from Voronezh to Moscow but their office was again searched by the Bolsheviks. The Supreme Lithuanian Council in Russia was officially liquidated on 19 April 1918 by the order of Joseph Stalin as chairman of the People's Commissariat for Nationalities and Vincas Kapsukas as chairman of the Lithuanian Commissariat. In March, Izvestia published an article on the Supreme Lithuanian Council which listed six accusations against it: declaring Lithuania's independence, sending a delegate to the Brest-Litovsk negotiations, establishing relations with the Ukrainian People's Republic, organizing refugee return to Lithuania, issuing Lithuanian passports, and engaging in counter-revolutionary activity.

Most members of the council returned to Lithuania. In May 1918, representatives of the Supreme Lithuanian Council in Russia recognized the Council of Lithuania as the only political representative of the Lithuanian nation. Some members of the Russian council joined the Council of Lithuania.

== Members ==
The council elected Kazys Grinius as its chairman, but he was away and therefore Pranas Mašiotas became the acting chairman. Martynas Yčas and Mykolas Sleževičius were vice-chairmen, Stasys Šilingas and Liudas Noreika were secretaries, Juozas Vailokaitis was the treasurer, Jonas Kriščiūnas was the office manager. Other members included Vytautas Petrulis, Juozas Bagdonas, Rapolas Skipitis, Jonas Jablonskis, and priests Julijonas Jasienskis, Emilijus Paukštys, Pranas Penkauskas.

In January 1918, the council coopted Jurgis Alekna, Eliziejus Draugelis, Juozas Vokietaitis, and Zigmas Žemaitis.

== Bibliography ==
- Aničas, Jonas (2007). Jonas ir Martynas Yčai: Gyvenimas ir darbai Lietuvai (in Lithuanian). Vaga. ISBN 978-5-415-01484-2.
- Blažytė-Baužienė, Danutė; Gimžauskas, Edmundas; Laurinavičius, Česlovas; Mačiulis, Dangiras; Rudis, Gediminas; Svarauskas, Artūras; Vaičenonis, Jonas (2014). Laurinavičius, Česlovas (ed.). Lietuvos istorija. Nepriklausomybė (1918–1940 m.) (in Lithuanian). Vol. X, part I. Vilnius: Baltos lankos. ISBN 978-9955-584-91-9.
- Čepėnas, Pranas (1986). Naujųjų laikų Lietuvos istorija. Vol. II. Chicago: Dr. Kazio Griniaus Fondas. OCLC 3220435.
- Eidintas, Alfonsas; Lopata, Raimundas (2017). Lietuvos Taryba ir nepriklausomos valstybės atkūrimas 1914–1920 metų dokumentuose (in Lithuanian). Vilnius: Mokslo ir enciklopedijų leidybos centras. ISBN 9785420017906.
- Grigaravičius, Algirdas (2013). "Politinė lietuvių veikla Rusijoje 1917 metais". Darbai ir dienos (in Lithuanian). 60: 23–72. doi:10.7220/2335-8769.60.2. ISSN 1392-0588.
- Grigaravičiūtė, Sandra (2017a). "Lietuvių ir Lietuvos piliečių atstovavimas Sibire 1918–1920 metais". Oikos: lietuvių migracijos ir diasporos studijos (in Lithuanian). 23/24: 25–63. doi:10.7220/2351-6561.23-24.2. hdl:20.500.12259/35988. ISSN 2351-6461.
- Grigaravičiūtė, Sandra (2017b). "Lietuvos Tarybos atstovavimas Sovietų Rusijoje 1918 metais". Parlamento studijos (in Lithuanian). 23: 11–44. ISSN 1822-749X.
- Lasinskas, Povilas (9 January 2019) [2011]. "Rusijos lietuvių seimas Petrograde". Visuotinė lietuvių enciklopedija (in Lithuanian). Mokslo ir enciklopedijų leidybos centras.
- "Lietuvių Vyriausios Tarybos posėdžiai". Lietuvių balsas (in Lithuanian). Vol. 66, no. 185. 7 December 1917.
- Sperskienė, Rasa (9 February 2017). "Lietuvių vyriausioji taryba Rusijoje". Lietuviškos partijos ir organizacijos Rusijoje 1917–1918 metais (in Lithuanian). Lietuvos mokslų akademijos Vrublevskių biblioteka.
- Sperskienė, Rasa (2023). "Lietuviškų organizacijų ir partijų Rusijoje 1917–1918 m. politinės veiklos reikšmę atskleidžiantys dokumentai LMA Vrublevskių bibliotekoje". LMA Vrublevskių bibliotekos darbai (in Lithuanian). 12: 57–84. ISSN 2783-7300.
- Svarauskas, Artūras (8 October 2014). "Voldemaras, Augustinas". 1914-1918-online. International Encyclopedia of the First World War. Freie Universität Berlin. doi:10.15463/ie1418.10183.
- "Vyriausioji lietuvių taryba Rusijoje". Visuotinė lietuvių enciklopedija (in Lithuanian). Mokslo ir enciklopedijų leidybos centras. 11 February 2025 [2018].
