= Farmers' Association =

Lithuanian political party

The Farmers' Association (Lithuanian: Ūkininkų sąjunga or ŪS) was an economic association and a political party in interwar Lithuania that closely associated with the Lithuanian Christian Democratic Party. The association was established in 1919 and effectively ceased activities in 1930, though continued formally until 1940. It was chaired by Aleksandras Stulginskis (1919–1922) and Eliziejus Draugelis (1922–1940). An association established in 1989 under the same name, claims historical heritage of the ŪS.

== History ==
=== Establishment ===
The founding meeting of the association took place on 28–29 December 1919. There were five official founders: Aleksandras Stulginskis, Jonas Vailokaitis, Mykolas Krupavičius, Juozas Vailokaitis, and Juozas Žebrauskas.

Initially, it was founded as a purely economic organization that sought to improve farmers' economic conditions guided by Christian values. The association's goals included defense of private property rights, improvements to production and processing of agricultural products, wider use of modern agricultural machinery and fertilizers, and wider availability of loans. In this regard, it closely resembled Žagrė Society, an agricultural cooperative that was active before World War I in Marijampolė.

=== Economic association ===
The association established agricultural cooperatives, cooperative diaries, credit unions, fruit and flax processing centers, grain cleaning points, etc. The main organizations operating under the auspices of the association included:

- Central Farmer's Bank (Centralinis ūkininkų bankas; 1924–1930)
- Center of Lithuanian Cooperatives (Lietuvos kooperatyvų centras; 1926–1930)
- Milk Union (Pieno sąjunga, 1926–1928)
- Union of Lithuanian Farmers' Cooperatives (Lietuvos ūkininkų kooperatyvų sąjunga; 1927–1928)
- Local credit unions (624 of them were established by 1928)

The association also founded local chapters that grew from 5 in 1919 to 380 in 1925. The number of members peaked at more than 20,000. The association published two periodicals: weekly Ūkininkas (1918–1940) and twice-monthly Gerovė (1928–1929).

=== Political party ===
The association was established by activists of the Lithuanian Christian Democratic Party. As such, the two organizations were closely connected and shared political agenda.

The ŪS won 18 seats in the 1920 election, and became part of the Christian Democratic Bloc alongside the Christian Democratic Party and the Labour Federation. Together, the Bloc held a majority in the First Seimas. The ŪS won 12 seats in the 1922 elections, with the Bloc just short of a majority. After governing with the support of independents, early elections were held in 1923 which saw the ŪS win 14 seats and the Bloc gain a parliamentary majority, allowing it to govern alone.

The 1926 elections saw a loss of support for the ŪS, as it was reduced to 11 seats. With the Labour Federation losing more than half its seats, the Christian Democratic Bloc lost its majority and control of the government.

=== Disestablishment ===
Following the December 1926 coup, the ŪS joined the opposition to the Antanas Smetona government, and was subsequently suspended as a political party by decree in 1928. Association's cooperatives and other agricultural establishments soon became bankrupt due to Smetona's policy. Therefore, the association became effectively inactive in 1930. Officially, it continued to function until the Soviet occupation of Lithuania in June 1940.

== Election results ==
Election	Votes	%	Seats	+/–	Status
1920	7,535 (Note: Most members of the association ran under the Lithuanian Christian Democratic Party lists)	1.10	18 / 112	Steady	Government
1922	97,977	12.07	12 / 78	▼6	Government
1923	129,942	14.42	14 / 78	▲2	Government
1926	113,819	11.19	11 / 85	▼3	Opposition
Source: Lietuvos statistikos metraštis 1924–1926
