= Achdus =

Electoral grouping in inter-war Lithuania

Jewish People's Election Group "Achdus" (Lithuanian: Žydų liaudies rinkimų grupė „Achdus“) was an electoral grouping in inter-war Lithuania. It was affiliated to Agudath Israel.

== History ==
It first contested the Constituent Assembly elections in Lithuania in 1920 as part of the Democratic Jewish Union, receiving two out of six seats for Dr. Nachman Rachmilewitz and R. Abraham Popelas.

The party contested the 1922 parliamentary elections, receiving 2.07% of the vote and winning no seats. However, it received only 53 votes in the 1923 elections. Yosef Shlomo Kahaneman, a member of Achdus, was elected on the United Minorities list. Two of their candidates, Isak Rafialas Golcbergas and Fišelis Beras ran on the Jewish Economical and Religious list in the 1926 election. Democratic Jewish Union also ran in 1926 but only as a merger of the Zionist and Folkist factions.

In the 1924 Kaunas municipal election the party received 1% of the vote and won one of the 72 available seats, taken by Męjeris Gurevičius, a merchant.
