= Labour Federation =

Labour Federation may refer to:

- Labour Federation (Italy)
- Labour Federation (Lithuania)
