= Eliziejus Draugelis =

Lithuanian physician and politician

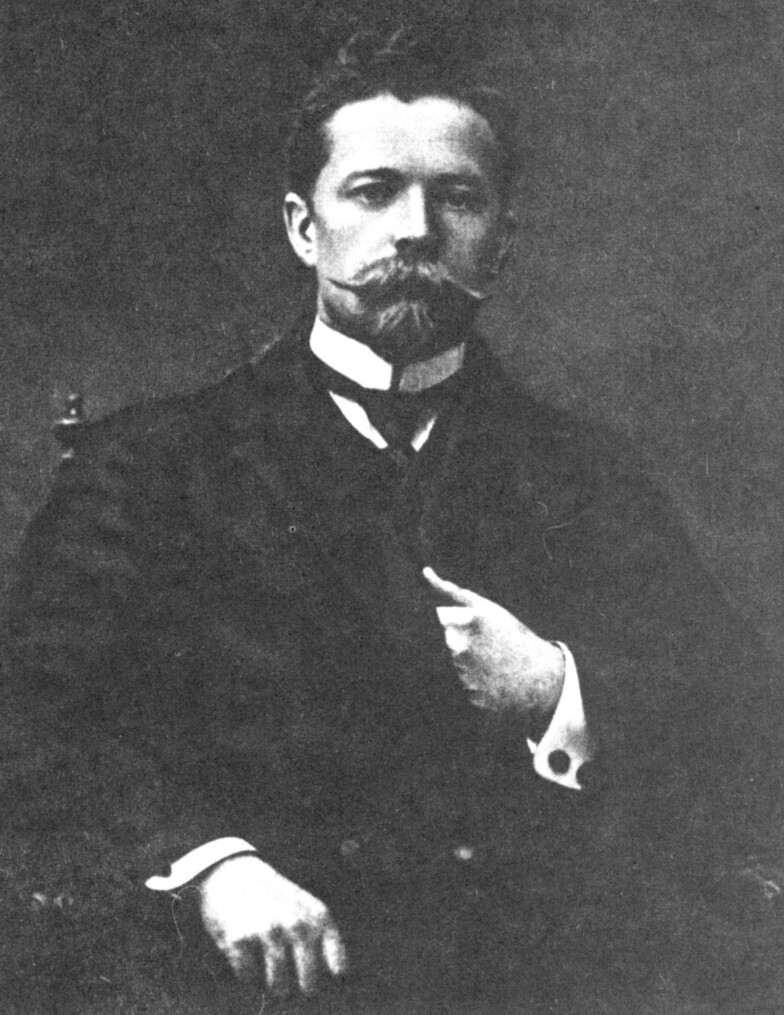
- Draugelis in Lithuania Album (1921)
- Born: 11 April 1888; Bardauskai, Suwałki Governorate, Congress Poland
- Died: 8 October 1981 (aged 93); São Paulo, Brazil
- Education: Marijampolė Gymnasium; Imperial Moscow University
- Occupations: Physician and politician
- Political party: Lithuanian Christian Democratic Party
- Board member of: Farmers' Association
- Relatives: Sister Magdalena Galdikienė

Eliziejus Draugelis (11 April 1888 – 8 October 1981) was a Lithuanian physician and politician.

== Early life and education ==
After finishing elementary school in his hometown, he attended the Marijampolė Gymnasium. In 1914, he graduated from the Faculty of Medicine of the Imperial Moscow University. During his studies, he founded Rūta, a society of Lithuanian Catholic students, and was its first chairman.

After the outbreak of World War I, he was mobilized and worked as a doctor in the Russian Imperial Army. In 1917, he became a member of the Supreme Council of Lithuanians in Russia, based in Voronezh, but in the same year he was arrested and imprisoned by the Bolsheviks for a month.

== Political career ==
In 1918, he returned to Lithuania and became the first mayor of Marijampolė (up to 1919). On 23 July 1918, he was co-opted to the Council of Lithuania. In the government of Ernestas Galvanauskas he took over the Ministry of Internal Affairs (1919–1920).

In 1919, he was among the founders of the Farmers' Association (Lietuvos ūkininkų sąjunga) and was its long-term chairman. In 1920, he was elected to the Constituent Assembly of Lithuania, and later was re-elected in 1922 and 1923 (in all cases, he was a member of Christian Democratic bloc). From 1923 until 1926, he served as Secretary of the Third Seimas.

== Medical career ==
After the coup of December 1926, he left politics and worked as a doctor. In 1926–1927, he headed the Department of Health and was the chief of the main hospital in Kaunas. In 1929, he was tried for corruption and served a prison sentence between October 1929 and March 1930. He was director of the psychiatric hospital in Kalvarija (1932–1940).

During the German occupation, he headed clinics in Gižai and Keturvalakiai. Shortly before the return of the Red Army to Lithuania, Draugelis retreated to Germany, where he served as chief physician at various Lithuanian refugee camps. In 1947, he immigrated to Brazil, where he obtained employment at the Faculty of Medicine of the University of São Paulo and in private hospitals and laboratories.

== Literature ==
- Dr. Draugelis Eliziejus, Trumpos Steigiamojo Seimo narių biografijos su atvaizdais, Klaipėda, 1924, p. 18.
- Draugelis Eliziejus, Lietuvių enciklopedija, Boston, 1955, t. 5, p. 172–173.
- Abromaitis A., Draugelis Eliziejus, Visuotinė lietuvių enciklopedija, Vilnius, 2004, p. 129.
- Veilentienė A., Draugelis Eliziejus, Lietuvos Steigiamojo Seimo (1920–1922 metų) narių biografinis žodynas, sud. A. Ragauskas, M. Tamošaitis, Vilnius, 2006, p. 137–139.
- Veilentienė A., Draugelis Eliziejus, Lietuvos Lietuvos Respublikos Seimų I (1922–1923), II (1923–1926), III (1926–1927), IV (1936–1940) narių biografinis žodynas, sud. Aivas Ragauskas, Mindaugas Tamošaitis. – Vilnius, 2007. – p. 242–245.

Political offices
Preceded by Petras Leonas	Minister of the Interior; 1919–1920	Succeeded by Rapolas Skipitis
