= Soviet–Lithuanian Treaty =

Soviet–Lithuanian Treaty can refer to three treaties between the Soviet Union and Lithuania:

- Soviet–Lithuanian Peace Treaty of 1920
- Soviet–Lithuanian Non-Aggression Pact of 1926
- Soviet–Lithuanian Mutual Assistance Treaty of 1939
