= Lithuanian German Committee =

The Lithuanian German Committee (Lithuanian: Lietuvos vokiečių komietetas, LVK) was a political party in inter-war Lithuania representing the German minority.

== History ==
The LVK contested the first parliamentary elections in Lithuania in 1920, receiving 1.1% of the vote and winning a single seat. The 1922 elections saw the party lose its seat, and in 1923 it joined the United Minorities coalition.
