= 1920 Lithuanian parliamentary election =

- 14–16 April 1920
- All 112 seats in the Constituent Assembly; 56 seats needed for a majority
Party	Leader	Vote %	Seats
LKDP	Mykolas Krupavičius	35.16	46
Peasant Union		17.05	20
LSDP		12.76	13
Labour Federation	Antanas Matulaitis	10.25	10
ŽDS		6.55	6
LSLDP		5.75	9
LCRK		4.27	3
Farmers' Association	Aleksandras Stulginskis	1.10	3
Socialist Company		1.10	1
German Committee		1.05	1
This lists parties that won seats. See the complete results below.
Results by constituency

Constituent Assembly elections were held in Lithuania between 14 and 16 April 1920. The Lithuanian Christian Democratic Party emerged as the largest party, winning 46 of the 112 seats. Together with its allies, the Lithuanian Labour Federation and Farmers' Association, it secured an absolute majority in the Assembly.

== Electoral system ==
The law on the conduct of Seimas elections was promulgated by the Council of Lithuania in the official newspaper of the government, Vyriausybės žinios (Government News) on 30 October 1919. Elections were to be universal, free and secret, and all citizens of Lithuania, both men and women over 21 years old, were allowed to vote. Citizens 24 years old or older were allowed to stand for election.

The elections were held using party-list proportional representation in nine multi-member constituencies. In practice, elections took place in only six of the nine constituencies as constituencies VII (Vilnius), VIII (Lida) and IX (Hrodna) were allocated to territories occupied by Poland during the Polish–Lithuanian War in 1920.

Parties and electoral groups (kuopa) were allowed to submit lists of candidates in constituencies, which had to be signed by at least fifty voters. As a result, there was a large number of small electoral lists in every constituency.

== Results ==
Graph of the party split among 112 seats.
Party	Votes	%	Seats
Lithuanian Christian Democratic Party	239,900	35.16	46
Peasant Union	116,298	17.05	20
Social Democratic Party of Lithuania	87,051	12.76	13
Labour Federation	69,907	10.25	10
Democratic Jewish Union	44,709	6.55	6
Lithuanian Popular Socialist Democratic Party	39,264	5.75	9
Central Polish Electoral Committee	29,156	4.27	3
Economic and Political Union of Lithuanian Farmers	7,651	1.12	0
Farmers' Association	7,535	1.10	3
Socialist Company of Workers and Farmers	7,498	1.10	1
Lithuanian German Committee	7,194	1.05	1
Party of National Progress	4,288	0.63	0
Polish List	3,665	0.54	0
Workers, Public Servants and the Landless	3,513	0.51	0
Group of the Landless and Small Landowners of Panevėžys	3,134	0.46	0
Santara	2,591	0.38	0
Union of Working People	2,535	0.37	0
Group of Landless in Biržai	817	0.12	0
Kybartai German Group	41	0.01	0
Independents	5,544	0.81	0
Total	682,291	100.00	112
Source: Nohlen & Stöver, Lietuvos statistikos metraštis, Lietuva

=== Seats by electoral district ===
Electoral list	I (Marijampolė)	II (Kaunas)	III (Raseiniai)	IV (Telšiai)	V (Panevėžys)	VI (Utena)	Total
Lithuanian Christian Democratic Party	14	3	7	6	8	8	46
Peasant Union	3	2	4	5	2	4	20
Social Democratic Party of Lithuania	−	3	2	−	6	2	13
Lithuanian Labour Federation	−	4	−	−	6	−	10
Lithuanian Popular Socialist Democratic Party	3	1	2	1	1	1	9
Democratic Jewish Union	1	1	1	1	1	1	6
Farmers' Association	−	3	−	−	−	−	3
Central Polish Electoral Committee	−	2	1	−	−	−	3
Socialist Company of Workers and Farmers	−	−	−	1	−	−	1
Lithuanian German Committee	−	1	−	−	−	−	1
Total	21	20	17	14	24	16	112

== See also ==
- List of members of the Constituent Assembly of Lithuania
