= 1923 Lithuanian parliamentary election =

- 12–13 May 1923
- All 78 seats in the Seimas; 40 seats needed for a majority
Party	Leader	Vote %	Seats	+/–
LVLS	Kazys Grinius	17.88	16	New
Labour Federation	Pranas Radzevičius	14.91	12	+1
LKDP	Mykolas Krupavičius	14.45	14	−3
Farmers' Association	Eliziejus Draugelis	14.42	14	+2
LSDP	Steponas Kairys	11.29	8	−3
United Minorities		11.03	10	New
LCRK	Kazimierz Janczewski	4.05	4	+3
This lists parties that won seats. See the complete results below.
Results by constituency
Prime Minister before	Prime Minister after
Ernestas Galvanauskas; LKDP-LDF-ŪS	Ernestas Galvanauskas; LKDP-LDF-ŪS

Parliamentary elections were held in Lithuania on 12 and 13 May 1923. The Lithuanian Popular Peasants' Union emerged as the largest party in the second Seimas, winning 16 of the 78 seats. However, the Labour Federation, Lithuanian Christian Democratic Party and the Farmers' Association won a majority of seats.

The elections were exceptionally successful for parties and lists representing ethnic minorities (Jews, Poles, Germans and Russians), receiving 18% of the vote and winning 14 seats, the highest total achieved in free and fair elections in Lithuania.

== Results ==
Party	Votes	%	Seats	+/–
Lithuanian Popular Peasants' Union	161,195	17.88	16	New
Labour Federation	134,393	14.91	12	+1
Lithuanian Christian Democratic Party	130,211	14.45	14	–1
Farmers' Association	129,942	14.42	14	+2
Social Democratic Party	101,778	11.29	8	–3
United Minorities	99,379	11.03	10	New
Central Polish Electoral Committee	50,064	5.55	4	+2
Workers' Group	23,126	2.57	0	–5
Labour Union of Polish Christian Workers in Kaunas	13,688	1.52	0	New
Party of National Progress	10,568	1.17	0	0
Economic and Political Union of Lithuanian Farmers	8,014	0.89	0	0
Group of Workers and Poor Peasants	6,797	0.75	0	0
Land and Freedom	4,428	0.49	0	0
Democratic National Freedom League	4,112	0.46	0	New
Dalgis	3,136	0.35	0	0
Union of Evangelical Lutherans	2,197	0.24	0	New
Party of the Landless and those who have very little land	1,364	0.15	0	0
Jewish Workers' Party	1,048	0.12	0	New
Polish Catholics' Party	499	0.06	0	New
Polish Workers' Party	484	0.05	0	New
Union of Lithuanian Evangelical Farmers	363	0.04	0	New
Individualists	294	0.03	0	New
Party of Russians and Belarusians	106	0.01	0	0
Achdus	53	0.01	0	0
Poor peasant groups (8)	8,101	0.90	0	–
Workers groups (4)	2,716	0.30	0	–
Independents	3,281	0.36	0	0
Total	901,337	100.00	78	0
Source: Nohlen & Stöver, Lietuvos statistikos metraštis

== Seats by electoral district ==
Electoral list	I (Marijampolė)	II (Kaunas)	III (Raseiniai)	IV (Telšiai)	V (Panevėžys)	VI (Utena)	Total
Lithuanian Popular Peasants' Union	2	2	3	3	4	2	16
Lithuanian Labour Federation	2	2	1	2	3	2	12
Lithuanian Christian Democratic Party	2	2	2	2	3	3	14
Farmers' Association	3	2	2	2	3	2	14
Social Democratic Party of Lithuania	1	2	1	−	3	1	8
United Minorities	2	4	1	−	−	3	10
Central Polish Electoral Committee	−	1	1	−	2	−	4
Total	12	15	11	9	18	13	78
