= Lithuanian Labour Federation =

National trade union center

LDF
- Lithuanian Labour Federation
- Lietuvos Darbo Federacija
- Founded: 1919
- Headquarters: Vilnius, Lithuania
- Location: Lithuania
- Members: 20,000
- Key people: Vydas Puskepalis, president
- Affiliations: ITUC, ETUC
- Website: www.ldf.lt

The Lithuanian Labour Federation (Lithuanian: Lietuvos darbo federacija, LDF), also known as the Christian Labour Party in 1934–1942, is a national trade union center in Lithuania. It was founded in 1919, but was subsequently dissolved at the time of the Soviet occupation. It was recreated in 1991.

The LDF is affiliated with the International Trade Union Confederation, and the European Trade Union Confederation.

== History ==
The party was established on 28 September 1919 during the Kaunas convention of the Lithuanian Christian Workers Association.

It won 15 seats in the 1920 elections and became part of the Christian Democratic Bloc alongside the Lithuanian Christian Democratic Party and the Farmers' Association. Together the Bloc held a majority in the Seimas, and formed a government with the Peasant Union. The DF won 11 seats in the 1922 elections, with the Bloc just short of a majority. After governing with the support of independents, early elections were held in 1923 which saw the DF win 12 seats and the Bloc gain a parliamentary majority, allowing it to govern alone.

The 1926 elections saw a significant loss of support for the DF, as its vote share fell from 15% in 1923 to 8%, with the party winning just five seats. As a result, the Christian Democratic Bloc lost its majority and control of the government.

Following the 1926 coup, the DF joined the opposition to the Antanas Smetona government. It was subsequently dissolved by decree in 1932. It was later resurrected as a non-partisan organisation under the name Association of Christian Workers on 15 April 1934, and grew to have 6,000 members by 1938.
