= Krzysztof Buchowski =

Polish historian

Krzysztof Buchowski (born 1969) is a Polish historian at Institute of History at University of Białystok. He specializes in Central and Eastern European history in 19th-20th century and Polish-Lithuanian relations.

== Books ==
- Polacy w niepodległym państwie litewskim 1918-1940 (Białystok, Instytut Historii Uniwersytetu w Białymstoku, 1999) ISBN 83-87881-06-6;
- Panowie i żmogusy. Stosunki polsko-litewskie w międzywojennych karykaturach (Białystok, Instytut Historii Uniwersytetu w Białymstoku, 2004) ISBN 83-87881-29-5;
- Szkice polsko-litewskie czyli o niełatwym sąsiedztwie w pierwszej polowie XX wieku (Wydawnictwo Grado, 2005) ISBN 83-89588-30-7;
- Litwomani i polonizatorzy. Mity, wzajemne postrzeganie i stereotypy w stosunkach polsko-litewskich w pierwszej połowie XX wieku (Białystok, Wydawnictwo Uniwersytetu w Białymstoku, 2006) ISBN 978-83-7431-075-8;
- Polityka zagraniczna Litwy 1990-2012. Główne kierunki i uwarunkowania (Białystok 2013, Wydawnictwo Uniwersyteckie Trans Humana, 2013) ISBN 978-83-61209-95-9.
