= 1922 Lithuanian parliamentary election =

- 10–11 October 1922
- All 78 seats in the Seimas; 40 seats needed for a majority
Party	Leader	Vote %	Seats	+/–
LKDP	Mykolas Krupavičius	17.11	15	−9
Peasant Union	Kazys Grinius	16.84	14	−5
Labour Federation	Pranas Radzevičius	12.44	11	−4
Farmers' Association	Eliziejus Draugelis	12.07	12	−6
LSDP	Steponas Kairys	10.42	11	−2
Workers' Group		4.96	5	New
Zionist Group		4.27	3	New
LCRK	Kazimierz Janczewski	4.05	1	−2
LDVK		1.35	1	New
LSLDP		1.05	5	−4
This lists parties that won seats. See the complete results below.
Results by constituency.
Prime Minister before	Prime Minister after election
Ernestas Galvanauskas; LKDP-LDF-ŪS	Ernestas Galvanauskas; LKDP-LDF-ŪS

Parliamentary elections were held in Lithuania on 10 and 11 October 1922, electing 78 members of the First Seimas. They were the first elections held in Lithuania under the 1922 constitution, which had been adopted by the Constituent Assembly on 1 August 1922.

38 out of 78 seats were won by a bloc of parties led by the Christian Democrats, and they acquired both the positions of President and Prime Minister, occupied by Aleksandras Stulginskis and Ernestas Galvanauskas respectively. In both cases, however, the Christian Democrats were not supported by any party in the opposition and could only form a minority government. Unable to work with such a makeup, the First Seimas was dissolved on 12 March 1923.

== Electoral system ==
The law on the conduct of Seimas elections was promulgated by the Constituent Assembly on 19 July 1922, and published in the official newspaper of the government, "Vyriausybės žinios" (Government News) on 27 July 1922. Elections were universal, free and secret, and all citizens of Lithuania, both men and women over 21 years old, were allowed to vote. Citizens 24 years old or older were allowed to stand for election.

The elections were held with party-list proportional representation, in nine multi-member constituencies. In practice, only six of the nine defined constituencies held elections, as Constituencies VII, VIII and IX were allocated to territories of the self-proclaimed Polish puppet state of Central Lithuania following Żeligowski's Mutiny during the Polish–Lithuanian War in 1920. Their centers were Vilnius, Lida and Grodno respectively. Seats in constituencies were distributed by largest remainder method.

Parties and electoral groups (kuopa) were allowed to submit lists of candidates to constituencies, which had to be signed by at least fifty voters. As such, there was a large number of small electoral lists in every constituency. However, the method of calculating the distribution of seats in each constituency benefited larger parties, as such, the only non-party electoral group which managed to gain seats were lists submitted by the underground Communist Party of Lithuania.

Initially, voting was designed to take place only one day, but several days before the elections law was amended to allow two days of voting (with possibility of a third day of voting). Three days of voting took place in Kelmė.

== Competing parties ==
The largest and most active electoral alliance in the election was the Christian Democratic Bloc, formed from the Lithuanian Christian Democratic Party and two satellite organizations - Labour Federation, which represented Catholic workers, and Farmers' Association, which represented Catholic peasantry. The Christian Democratic Bloc was strongly supported by the Lithuanian priesthood, which had a strong influence in the agrarian and less literate countryside, and numerous priests were a part of their electoral lists.

However, the Christian Democrats were isolated in the political arena. Historically, LKDP evolved from a different stream of the Lithuanian National Revival than all of their competitors - the Peasant Union, Social Democrats and Party of National Progress (later the Lithuanian Nationalist Union). All of them evolved from the secular nationalist newspaper Varpas, while the Christian Democrats evolved around the Catholic periodical Tėvynės sargas.

The alliance of the Peasant Union and Popular Socialist Party presented itself as socialist and campaigned for secularization and the lifting of martial law. Though the main targets of the criticism were Christian Democrats and National Progress, they were also in opposition to the Social Democrats. The Social Democrats presented their electoral campaign as the first step towards a peaceful socialist revolution and campaigned for a "Seimas of the workers". All political parties supported the land reforms put in place by the Constituent Assembly, and oftentimes argued that their competitors will be the ones to roll back the reform.

Separate electoral lists by the Polish, Jewish and Russian minorities also competed in the election.

== Results ==
Graph of the party split among 78 seats.
Party	Votes	%	Seats	+/–
Lithuanian Christian Democratic Party	138,912	17.11	15	–9
Peasant Union	136,713	16.84	14	–5
Labour Federation	101,024	12.44	11	–4
Farmers' Association	97,977	12.07	12	–6
Social Democratic Party	84,643	10.42	11	–2
Workers' Group	40,236	4.96	5	New
Zionist Group for the Nation and Autonomy	34,697	4.27	3	New
Central Polish Electoral Committee	32,849	4.05	1	–2
Achdus	16,841	2.07	0	New
Party of National Progress	14,131	1.74	0	0
Group of Workers and Poor Peasants	11,733	1.44	0	New
Russians and Belarusians	11,289	1.39	0	New
Group of Polish Workers and Peasants	10,995	1.35	1	New
Economic and Political Union of Lithuanian Farmers	9,425	1.16	0	0
Landless and Small Landowners	8,541	1.05	0	New
Lithuanian Popular Socialist Democratic Party	8,506	1.05	5	–4
Lithuanian German Committee	7,975	0.98	0	–1
Union of Evangelical Lutherans	7,138	0.88	0	New
Land and Freedom	5,316	0.65	0	New
Union of Working People	4,201	0.52	0	0
Polish Electors of the First District	4,105	0.51	0	New
Committee of Jewish People	3,919	0.48	0	New
Group of Latvians and Germans	2,113	0.26	0	New
Workers' Labour Union of Marijampolė and Alytus	1,468	0.18	0	New
Association of Kaunas House Owners	1,372	0.17	0	New
Dalgis	1,168	0.14	0	New
Union of Latvians in Lithuania	1,130	0.14	0	New
Workers Party	1,044	0.13	0	New
Agriculturalists and Farmers	923	0.11	0	New
Workers, Small Landowners and Landless of Panevėžys	647	0.08	0	New
Socialist Day Labourer's Group	247	0.03	0	New
Polish Group of Prienai	112	0.01	0	New
Independents	10,597	1.31	0	–2
Total	811,987	100.00	78	–34
Source: Nohlen & Stöver. Lietuvos statistikos metraštis, Ragauskas & Tamošaitis

== Aftermath ==
Though the Christian Democratic Bloc achieved a plurality of the seats, they were unable to form a majority coalition, nor did the opposition parties manage to unite against them. The next President and Prime Minister were thus elected via violations of electoral conduct. Protesting against the Christian Democrats, the opposition parties refused to participate in the election of Aleksandras Stulginskis and he was elected solely with Christian Democratic votes. Two governments led by independent politician Ernestas Galvanauskas were formed, but in both cases they were approved with 38 votes in favor and 38 votes against (2 members of the Seimas did not participate), which the opposition criticized as illegal.

The formed government was unstable and the First Seimas was dissolved on 12 March 1923.

== Bibliography ==
- Eidintas, Alfonsas; Vytautas Žalys; Alfred Erich Senn (September 1999). Ed. Edvardas Tuskenis (ed.). Lithuania in European Politics: The Years of the First Republic, 1918-1940 (Paperback ed.). New York: St. Martin's Press. pp. 44, 85. ISBN 0-312-22458-3.
