= Farmers' Party (Lithuania) =

The Farmers' Party (Lithuanian: Ūkininkų partija, ŪP) was a liberal political party in inter-war Lithuania.

== History ==
The party was established as the Democratic National Freedom League (Demokratinė tautos laisvės santara known simply as Santara and its members as santarininkai) in March 1917 by Lithuanian refugees in Saint Petersburg. The party initially advocated for Lithuanian autonomy within the Russian Empire. Its members were liberal intelligentsia, including future Ministers of Justice Petras Leonas and Stasys Šilingas, diplomats Vaclovas Sidzikauskas and Jurgis Baltrušaitis. In 1917–1920, they published newspaper Santara in St. Petersburg, Moscow, and Kaunas.

The party gained just 2,591 votes in the 1920 parliamentary elections and did not participate in the 1922 or 1923 elections but had members in almost every government in 1918–1922.

In 1925, it became the Farmers' Party and published weekly Ūkininkų balsas (Voice of Farmers) until 1928. It won two seats in the 1926 elections (Rapolas Skipitis and Jonas Pranas Aleksa), forming part of the government coalition with the Lithuanian Popular Peasants' Union and the Social Democratic Party of Lithuania. Following the 1926 coup, the party was a member of Antanas Smetona's coalition government alongside the Lithuanian Nationalist Union and the Christian Democratic Bloc. Aleksa became Minister of Agriculture and Juozas Jankevičius Minister of Communications. The party pulled out of the coalition around May 1927, but Aleksa disobeyed and remained minister until 1935. The party was banned later in 1928.

== Ideology ==
The party held had secular and liberal platform, and unlike other agrarian parties, advocated religious tolerance. It sought to support the interests of agriculture and industry, as well as measures to develop Lithuanian culture. The party envisioned itself as a mediator between the political right and left.
