= Soviet–Lithuanian Non-Aggression Pact =

1926 treaty between the Soviet Union and Lithuania

- Signed: 28 September 1926
- Location: Moscow, Russian SFSR, USSR
- Effective: 9 November 1926
- Original signatories: Soviet Union, Lithuania
- Signatories: Georgy Chicherin; Sergey Alexandrovsky; Mykolas Sleževičius; Jurgis Baltrušaitis
- Parties: Soviet Union; Lithuania
- Languages: Russian; Lithuanian

Soviet–Lithuanian Non-Aggression Pact (Lithuanian: Lietuvos–SSRS nepuolimo sutartis) was a non-aggression pact, signed between the Soviet Union and Lithuania on September 28, 1926. The pact confirmed all basic provisions of the Soviet–Lithuanian Peace Treaty of 1920. The Soviet Union continued to recognize Vilnius and Vilnius Region as Lithuanian, despite the territories being under Polish control since Żeligowski's Mutiny in 1920. It also recognized Lithuania's interests in the Klaipėda Region. In exchange, Lithuania agreed not to join any alliances directed against the Soviet Union, which meant international isolation at the time when Soviet Union was not a member of the League of Nations. Ratifications were exchanged in Kaunas on November 9, 1926, and the pact became effective on the same day. The pact was registered in the League of Nations Treaty Series on March 4, 1927.

The pact was initiated by Lithuanians who sought a new direction in the foreign policy after the Locarno Treaties. The negotiations started on December 25, 1925 when People's Commissar of Foreign Affairs Georgy Chicherin stopped in Kaunas on his way to Moscow. The negotiations were difficult, as Latvia and Estonia disapproved the pact because it prevented creation of the Baltic Entente, Poland claimed that the agreement violated the Peace of Riga, and Germany was wary over strengthening Lithuanian claims to the Klaipėda Region.

The pact was controversial in Lithuania and its ratification by the Third Seimas on 5 November 1926 caused student protests against the "Bolshevization" of Lithuania. As one of the protests was dispersed by force, it is cited as one of the reasons for the military coup in December 1926. However, the diplomats believed that keeping the dispute over the Vilnius Region relevant in European politics was worth the cost. The original pact was set to expire in five years, but on 6 May 1931, it was extended for another five years. On April 4, 1934, it was further extended to December 31, 1944. A separate convention was signed to define "aggression" on 5 July 1933. The pact was broken on 15 June 1940 with the Soviet occupation of Lithuania.
