= Second Seimas =

Second Seimas of Lithuania
| ← | First Seimas | Third Seimas | → |
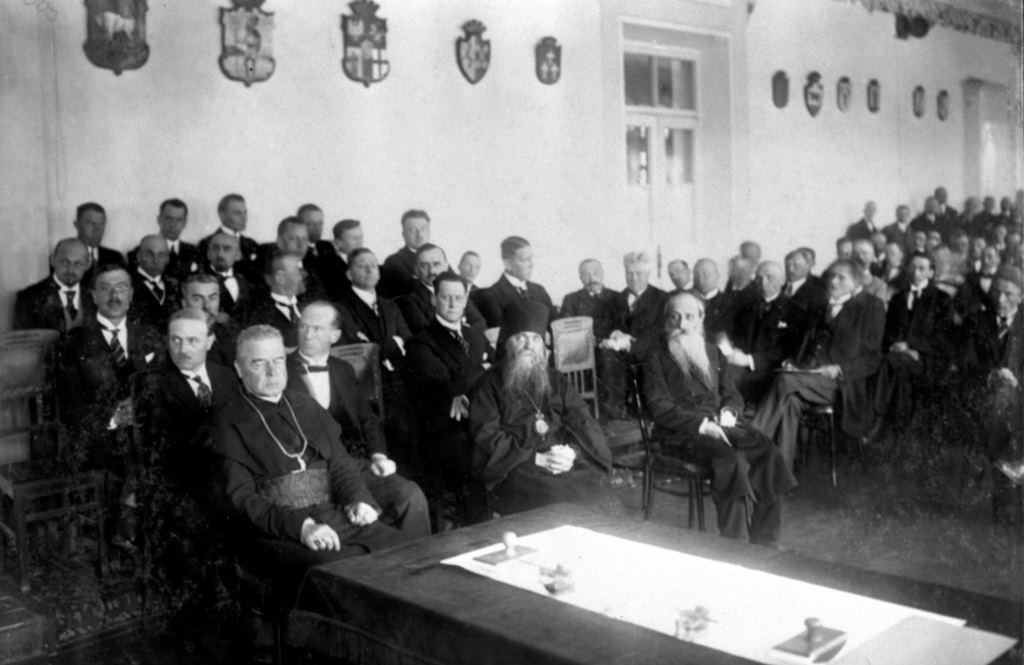
- Opening meeting on 5 June 1923

Overview
- Legislative body: Seimas
- Jurisdiction: Lithuania
- Term: 1923—1926

The Second Seimas of Lithuania was the second parliament (Seimas) democratically elected in Lithuania after it declared independence on February 16, 1918. It was the only regular interwar Seimas which completed its full three-year term from May 1923 to March 1926.

Results of 1923 parliamentary elections
| Party | Seats |
|---|---|
| Christian Democratic Bloc (krikdemai) | 40 |
| Peasant Union (liaudininkai) | 16 |
| Social Democrats (socdemai) | 8 |
| Minorities (Jews, Poles, Germans, Russians) | 14 |
| Total | 78 |

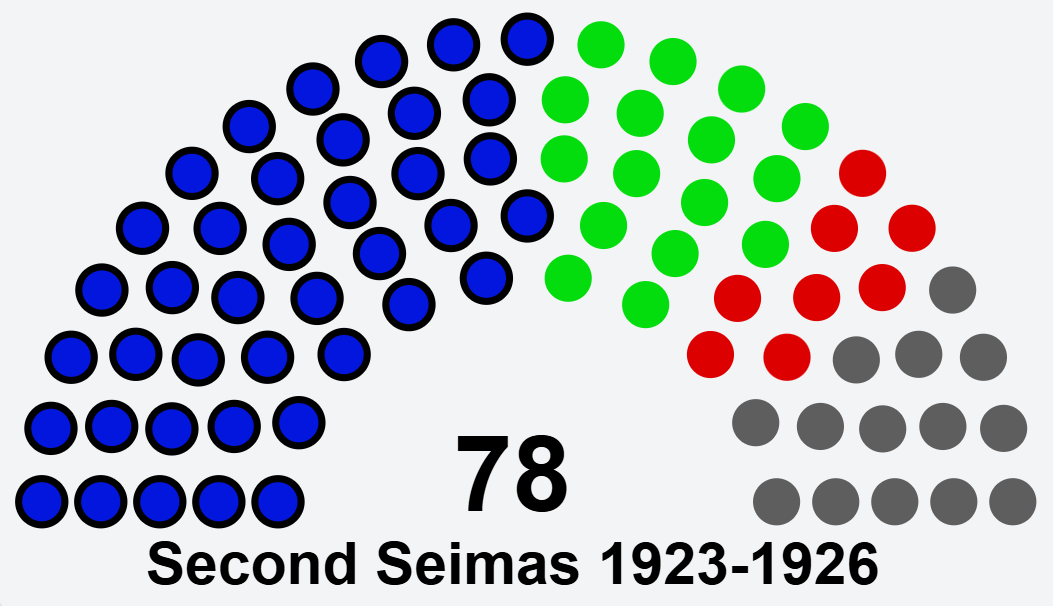

== History ==
The First Seimas, elected in fall 1922, was in virtual deadlock as no party or coalition could gain a majority. President Aleksandras Stulginskis was forced to dissolve it on March 12, 1923. The elections to a new Seimas took place on May 12 and May 13, 1923. The Christian Democrats gained two additional seats which were enough to give them a slim majority. At first they tried to form a coalition with the Lithuanian Peasant Popular Union. The Populists demanded lifting the martial law (introduced during the Lithuanian Wars of Independence), prohibiting political campaigning in churches, and three portfolios in the new cabinet of ministers. The Christian Democrats were not inclined to satisfy the demands and the coalition broke apart in June 1924.

The Christian Democrats reelected Stulginskis as the President of Lithuania and Ernestas Galvanauskas as the Prime Minister. The new cabinet of ministers included two Populists: Ministers of Internal Affairs and Transport. However, the government was not stable and was forced to resign in June 1924 after the coalition with Populists collapsed. The new cabinet, headed by Antanas Tumėnas, managed to stay in power only for seven months. In January 1925, Vytautas Petrulis was asked to form a new cabinet. It resigned in September 1925 when it agreed to neutralize the Neman River and allow international traffic, which primarily benefited Poland, an enemy of Lithuania over the Vilnius Region. The last cabinet was formed by Leonas Bistras. Despite apparent political instability the Seimas managed to introduce some economic stability. The country, after years of World War I and Independence Wars, entered a peaceful period. The Seimas continued the land reform, expanded the network of primary and secondary schools, introduced social support systems.
