= Third Seimas =

Third Seimas of Lithuania
←	Second Seimas	Fourth Seimas	→

Overview
- Legislative body: Seimas
- Jurisdiction: Lithuania
- Term: 1926—1927

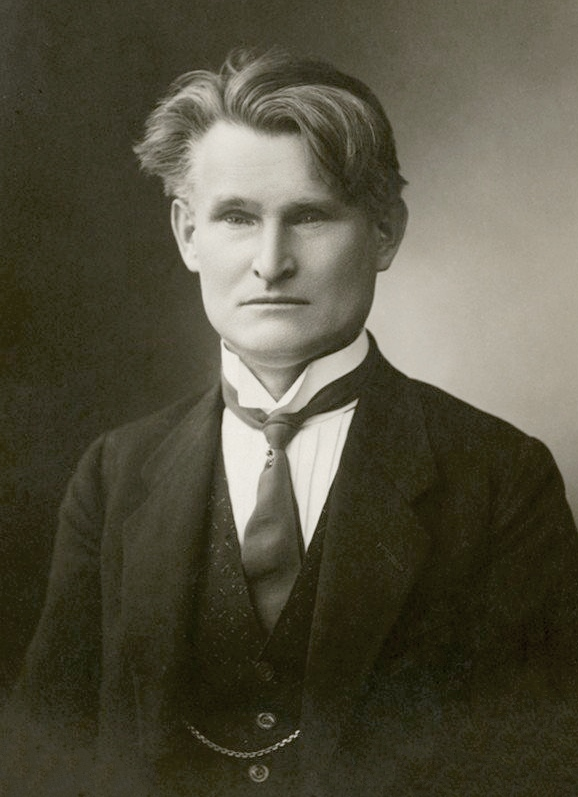
President Kazys Grinius, democratically elected by the Third Seimas.

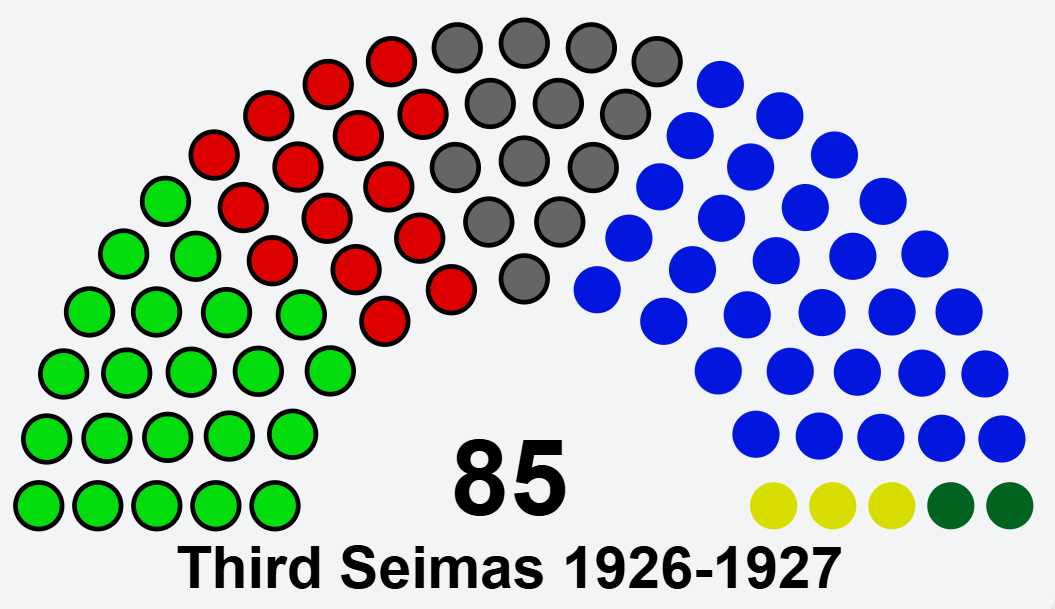
The Third Seimas of Lithuania was the third parliament (Seimas) democratically elected in Lithuania after it declared independence on 16 February 1918. The elections took place on 8–10 May 1926. For the first time the Lithuanian Christian Democratic Party were forced to remain in opposition. The coalition government made some unpopular decisions and was sharply criticized. Regular Seimas work was interrupted by a military coup d'état in December 1926 when the democratically elected government was replaced with the authoritarian government of Antanas Smetona and Augustinas Voldemaras. The Third Seimas was dissolved on 12 March 1927 and new elections were not called until 1936.

== Elections ==
Results of 1926 parliamentary election
Party	Seats
Christian Democrats (krikdemai)	30
Peasant Popular Union (liaudininkai)	22
Social Democrats (socdemai)	15
National Union (tautininkai)	3
Farmers' Union	2
Minorities (Germans, Jews, and Poles)	13
Total	85

For the first time since 1920 the Christian Democrats, which strongly supported the Catholic Church and clergy, did not obtain a political majority. Lithuanian people were disillusioned with the party as it was shaken by several financial scandals, did not cope with an economic crisis effectively, and ran into diplomatic disputes with Vatican, which recognized Polish claims to the Vilnius Region.

The Peasant Popular Union and Social Democrats formed a left-wing coalition against the Christian Democrats. Still not enough for a majority, the coalition had to include the minorities (Germans from the Klaipėda Region, Poles, and Jews). On 7 June Kazys Grinius was elected the 3rd President of Lithuania and Mykolas Sleževičius became the Prime Minister. Both of them were members of the Peasant Popular Union.

== Activities ==
The new government was sharply attacked by the opposition. It lifted martial law, still in effect in Kaunas and other localities, restored democratic freedoms, and declared broad amnesty to political prisoners. For the first time Lithuania became truly democratic. Communists quickly took advantage of the freedom of speech and held a protest, attended by approximately 400 people, in Kaunas on 13 June. The protest was dispersed, but the opposition attacked the government alleging that the incident presented a great threat to Lithuania and its military which the government was incapable of dealing with.

Further allegations of "Bolshevization" were made after Lithuania signed the non-aggression treaty with the Soviet Union. The treaty, signed on 28 September 1926, was conceived by the previous Seimas dominated by the Christian Democrats. However, this time Christian Democrats voted against the treaty, while Antanas Smetona strongly supported it. It drew sharp criticism as Lithuania exchanged repeated recognition of its rights to the Vilnius Region for international isolation as the treaty demanded that Lithuania make no other alliances with other countries. On 21 November a student demonstration against "Bolshevization" was forcibly dispensed by the police.

Public outcry continued when the government, catering to the minorities, allowed over 80 Polish schools to open at the same time that the Polish government was closing Lithuanian schools in the fiercely contested Vilnius Region. The coalition government went head-to-head against the Christian Democrats when it proposed the cutting of salaries to the clergy and subsidies to Catholic schools from the 1927 budget. Further enemies were made when 200 conservative military officers were fired. The military started planning the December coup.

== The coup and dissolution ==
The coup started on 17 December 1926, the 60th birthday of President Kazys Grinius as all important officials gathered in Kaunas for the celebration and before the 1927 budget with cuts to military and church was passed. The Seimas was dispersed and the President was placed under house arrest. Prime Minister Sleževičius resigned, and President Grinius appointed Augustinas Voldemaras as the new Prime Minister. Smetona and Voldemaras, both representing the Lithuanian National Union, invited Christian Democrats to join them in forming a new government and restoring some constitutional legitimacy. On 19 December, 42 delegates (without Social Democrats and Peasant Popular Union) of the Seimas convened and elected Aleksandras Stulginskis as the new Speaker of the Seimas, making him a formal head of state for a few hours before Smetona was elected as the President (38 deputies voted for, two against, and two abstained). The Seimas also gave a vote of confidence to the new cabined formed by Voldemaras. Therefore, constitutional formalities were observed.

Christian Democrats, who believed that the coup was just a temporary measure, demanded new elections to Seimas while Smetona stalled predicting that his party would not be popular and that he would not be reelected as the President. The Nationalists were discussing constitutional changes to empower the executive branch while curbing the powers of Seimas. In April a group of populists tried to organize a coup "to defend the constitution," but it was discovered and the rebels were arrested. Among them were Juozas Pajaujis, member of the Seimas. On 12 April 1927 the Seimas, appalled by such an arrest, delivered motion of no confidence against the Voldemaras government. Smetona, using his constitutional right, dissolved the Seimas. The constitution was broken, however, when no new elections were called in two months. The next elections took place only in 1936.
