= 1926 Lithuanian coup d'état =

1926 military coup d'état in Lithuania

Date	17 December 1926
Location	Kaunas
Result	Coup successful: President Kazys Grinius replaced by Antanas Smetona; Prime Minister Mykolas Sleževičius replaced by Augustinas Voldemaras; Third Seimas dissolved and constitution suspended in March 1927; Lithuanian Nationalist Union gains power

Belligerents
Government of Lithuania	Lithuanian Armed Forces

Commanders and leaders
Mykolas Sleževičius; Kazys Grinius	Povilas Plechavičius; Antanas Smetona

Political support
Social Democratic Party of Lithuania; Lithuanian Popular Peasants' Union	Lithuanian Nationalist Union; Lithuanian Christian Democratic Party

Casualties and losses
Hundreds arrested; four communists executed	

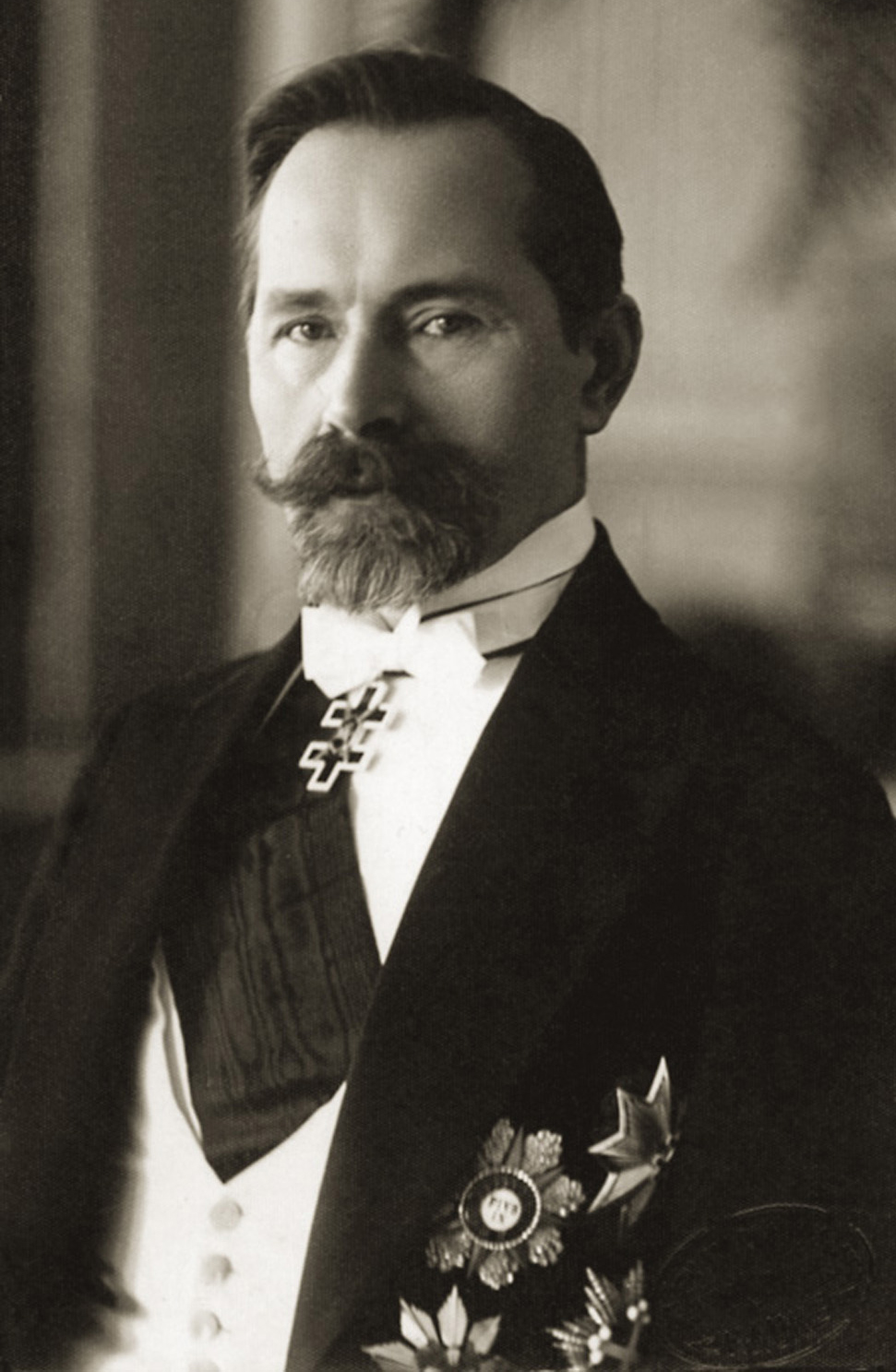
Antanas Smetona and his party were major beneficiaries of the coup.

The 1926 Lithuanian coup d'état (Lithuanian: 1926-ųjų perversmas) was a military coup d'état in Lithuania that replaced the democratically elected government with a authoritarian regime led by Antanas Smetona. The coup took place on 17 December 1926 and was largely organized by the military; Smetona's role remains the subject of debate. The coup brought the Lithuanian Nationalist Union, the most conservative party at the time, to power. Previously it had been a fairly new and insignificant nationalistic party. By 1926, its membership reached about 2,000 and it had won only three seats in the parliamentary elections. The Lithuanian Christian Democratic Party, the largest party in the Seimas at the time, collaborated with the military and provided constitutional legitimacy to the coup, but accepted no major posts in the new government and withdrew in May 1927. After the military handed power over to the civilian government, it ceased playing a direct role in political life.

== Background ==
Lithuania was incorporated into the Russian Empire in 1795. It was occupied by Germany during World War I, and declared itself independent on 16 February 1918. The next two years were marked by the Lithuanian Wars of Independence, which delayed international recognition and the establishment of political institutions. The newly formed army fought the Bolsheviks, the Bermontians, and Poland. In October 1920, Poland annexed Vilnius, the historic and modern capital of Lithuania, and the area surrounding it; known as Żeligowski's Mutiny, this action caused ongoing tension between the two powers in the interwar period. Lithuania's second-largest city, Kaunas, was designated the interim capital.

The Constituent Assembly of Lithuania elected in April 1920 adopted a constitution in August 1922; elections to the First Seimas took place in October 1922. The most-disputed constitutional issue was the role of the presidency. Eventually, the powers of government were heavily weighted in favor of the unicameral parliament (Seimas). Members of the Seimas were elected for three-year terms. Each new Seimas directly elected the president, who was authorized to appoint a prime minister. The prime minister then confirmed a cabinet of ministers. The presidential term was limited to no more than two three-year terms in succession. The parliamentary system proved unstable: eleven cabinets were formed between November 1918 and December 1926.

The principal political actors at the time of the coup had been active in the independence movement and the republic's first few years. Antanas Smetona was Lithuania's first president from April 1919 to June 1920; he then withdrew from formal political involvement, although he published political criticism, for which he served a brief prison term in 1923. Augustinas Voldemaras represented Lithuania at the Treaty of Brest-Litovsk in 1918 and later served as prime minister, minister of defense, and minister of foreign affairs. He resigned from the government in 1920, but continued to write and publish political criticism, for which he also was again sentenced to a short prison term. Kazys Grinius had chaired a post-World War I repatriation commission, and served as head of the 6th cabinet of ministers and in the First and Second Seimas. Mykolas Sleževičius served as prime minister in 1918 and 1919, oversaw the organization of the Lithuanian armed forces in 1920, and was a member of the Second Seimas between 1922 and 1926.

== 1926 parliamentary election ==
Results of the 1926 parliamentary election
Party	Seats
Christian Democratic Bloc (krikdemai)	30
Peasant Popular Union (liaudininkai)	22
Social Democrats (socdemai)	15
National Union (tautininkai)	3
Farmers' Party	2
Minorities (Germans, Jews, and Poles)	13
Total	85

Between 8 and 10 May 1926, regular elections to the Third Seimas took place. For the first time since 1920, the bloc led by the Lithuanian Christian Democratic Party, which strongly supported the Roman Catholic Church and its clergy, did not win a majority. The Lithuanian people were disillusioned with this party, whose members had been involved in several financial scandals: Juozas Purickis had used his diplomatic privileges in Moscow to deal in cocaine and saccharin; Eliziejus Draugelis and Petras Josiukas purchased cheap low-quality smoked pig fat from Germany instead of from Lithuanian farmers; and the minister of finance, Vytautas Petrulis, transferred a large sum of money from the state budget to his personal account. The party's strategies for economic crisis were perceived as ineffective.

An additional tension arose when the Concordat of 1925 between Poland and the Holy See unilaterally recognized Vilnius as an ecclesiastical province of Poland, despite Lithuanian requests to govern Vilnius directly from Rome. It was not traditionally a Vatican policy to establish an arrangement of this type, but the decision was objected to strongly by many Lithuanians. The decision implied that the Pope had recognized the Polish claims to Vilnius, creating a loss of prestige for the Christian Democrats. Diplomatic relations with the Holy See were severed, and did not improve when Pope Pius XI unilaterally established and reorganized Lithuanian ecclesiastical provinces in April 1926 without regard to Lithuanian proposals and demands.

The Popular Peasants' Union and the Social Democrats formed a left-wing coalition opposing the Christian Democrats. But the coalition still did not constitute a majority, and went on to add representatives of minorities in Lithuania – Germans from the Klaipėda Region, Poles, and Jews. On 7 June, Kazys Grinius was elected the third president of Lithuania and Mykolas Sleževičius became the prime minister. Both were members of the Popular Peasants' Union.

== Causes ==
The reasons for the coup remain the subject of debate. The domestic situation was definitely troubled. Historians have pointed to specific European precedents in the 1920s that may have had an influence, including the 1922 March on Rome by Benito Mussolini in Italy and the May 1926 Coup of Józef Piłsudski in Poland. Other historians have cited more general trends in Europe that resulted in more or less undemocratic governments in almost all of Central and Eastern Europe by the end of the 1930s. Historians have also cited an exaggerated fear of communism as a factor, along with the lack of a stable center that could reach out to parties on the left and right; parties accused one another of Bolshevism and fascism. According to historian Anatol Lieven, Smetona and Voldemaras saw themselves as the dispossessed true heroes of the independence movement, who despaired of returning to power by democratic means.

After the May elections, the Grinius/Sleževičius government lifted martial law, still in effect in Kaunas and elsewhere, restored democratic freedoms, and granted broad amnesty to political prisoners. For the first time, Lithuania was truly democratic. However, the change did not meet with universal approval. Many released prisoners were communists who quickly used the new freedoms of speech to organize a protest attended by approximately 400 people in Kaunas on 13 June, a day after the acquittal of 92 members of the Workers' Group of Lithuania. The protest was dispersed. The new government opposition used the protest in a public attack on the government, saying that it allowed illegal organizations (the Communist Party of Lithuania was still outlawed) to freely continue their activities. Despite its local nature, the incident was presented as a major threat to Lithuania and its military' and the government was said to be incapable of dealing with it.

Further allegations of "Bolshevization" came after Lithuania signed the Soviet–Lithuanian Non-Aggression Treaty of 28 September 1926. The treaty had been conceived by a previous government dominated by Christian Democrats. However, the Christian Democrats voted against the treaty and Antanas Smetona strongly supported it. It drew sharp criticism, as Lithuania exchanged Soviet recognition of its rights to the Vilnius for international isolation; the treaty demanded that Lithuania make no alliances with other countries. At the time, the Soviet Union was not a member of the League of Nations. France and the United Kingdom were looking for reliable partners in Eastern Europe, and the Baltic states were contemplating a union of their own. On 21 November, a student demonstration against "Bolshevization" was forcibly dispersed by the police. About 600 Lithuanian students gathered near a communist-led workers' union. The police, fearing armed clashes between the two groups, intervened and attempted to stop the demonstration. Seven police officers were injured and thirteen students were arrested. In an attempt to overthrow the government legally, the Christian Democrats suggested a motion of no confidence in response to the incident, but it was rejected.

Another public outcry arose when the government, seeking the support of ethnic minorities, allowed the opening of over 80 Polish schools in Lithuania. At the time, the Polish government was closing Lithuanian schools in the fiercely contested Vilnius Region. The coalition government directly confronted the Christian Democrats when it proposed a 1927 budget that reduced salaries to the clergy and subsidies to Catholic schools. Further controversies were created when the government's military reform program was revealed as careless downsizing. Some 200 conservative military officers were fired. The military began planning the coup.

== Preparations ==
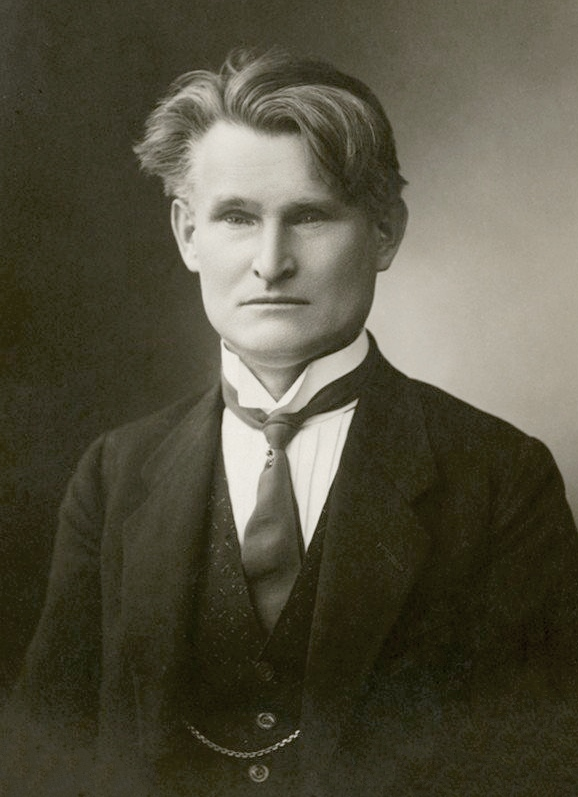
President Kazys Grinius was ousted by the military on his 60th birthday.

Academics have debated the involvement of Antanas Smetona in planning the coup. In 1931 Augustinas Voldemaras, since ousted from the government and forced into exile, wrote that Smetona had planned the coup since 1925. Historian Zenonas Butkus asserted that the idea of a coup had been raised as early as 1923. However, the time frame is disputed, since the military did not take action until the autumn of 1926. Smetona's personal secretary, Aleksandras Merkelis, held that Smetona knew about the coup, but neither inspired nor organized it. Before the coup, Smetona had been the editor of Lietuvis (The Lithuanian). A shift in its orientation in late November has been cited as evidence he was not informed about the coup until then. Before the 25 November issue appeared, the newspaper had been critical of the government and of the Christian Democrats. That day however, the newspaper published several articles about the 21 November student protest and an article headlined Bolshevism's Threat to Lithuania. The latter argued that the communists posed a genuine threat and the current government was incapable of dealing with them. After that, the newspaper ceased criticising the Christian Democrats.

On 20 September 1926, five military officers led by Captain Antanas Mačiuika organized a committee which included generals Vladas Nagevičius and Jonas Bulota among its members. About a month later, another group, the so-called Revolutionary General Headquarters (Lithuanian: revoliucinis generalinis štabas) was formed. The two groups closely coordinated their efforts. By 12 December, the military had already planned detailed actions, scouted the areas where the action was to take place, and informed the leaders of the Lithuanian National Union and Christian Democratic parties. Rumors of the plan reached the Social Democrats, but they took no action. Just before the coup, disinformation about movements of the Polish army in the Vilnius Region was disseminated; its purpose was to induce troops in Kaunas that could potentially have opposed the coup to move towards Vilnius.

== The coup ==
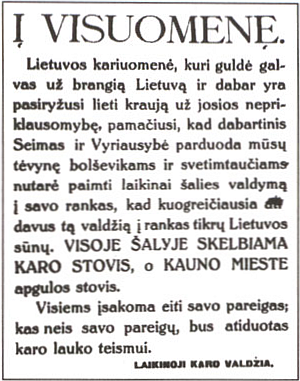
A pamphlet distributed in Kaunas following the coup declared martial law and commanded everyone to go about their daily duties. It was signed by the Temporary War Government.

Late in the evening of 16 December, the Soviet consul informed Sleževičius about a possible coup the following night, but Sleževičius did not pay much attention to this warning. The coup began on the night of 17 December 1926. The 60th birthday of President Kazys Grinius was being celebrated in Kaunas, attended by numerous state officials. The 1927 budget, with its cuts to military and church spending, had not yet passed. During the night, military forces occupied central military and government offices and arrested officials. Colonel Kazys Škirpa, who had initiated the military reform program, tried to rally troops against the coup, but was soon overpowered and arrested. The Seimas was dispersed and President Grinius was placed under house arrest. Colonel Povilas Plechavičius was released from prison, where he had been serving a 20-day sentence for a fistfight with another officer, and declared dictator of Lithuania. Later that day, Colonel Plechavičius asked Smetona to become the new president and normalize the situation. The military strove to create the impression that the coup had been solely their initiative, that Smetona had not been involved at all, and he had joined only in response to an invitation to become the "savior of the nation". Prime Minister Sleževičius resigned, and President Grinius appointed Augustinas Voldemaras as the new Prime Minister.

Smetona and Voldemaras, both representing the Lithuanian National Union, invited the Christian Democrats to join them in forming a new government that would restore some degree of constitutional legitimacy. The party agreed reluctantly; they were worried about their prestige. Looking toward the near future, the Christian Democrats reasoned that they could easily win any upcoming Seimas elections and regain power by constitutional means and avoid direct association with the coup. In keeping with this strategy, they allowed members of the Lithuanian National Union to take the most prominent posts.

Initially, President Grinius refused to resign, but he was eventually persuaded that a Polish invasion was imminent and Smetona had sworn to uphold the constitution. On 19 December 42 delegates of the Seimas met (without the Social Democrats or the Peasant Popular Union) and elected Aleksandras Stulginskis as Speaker of the Seimas. Stulginskis was the formal head of state for a few hours before Smetona was elected president (38 deputies voted for, two against, and two abstained). The Seimas also passed a vote of confidence in the new cabinet formed by Voldemaras. Constitutional formalities were thereby observed. The Lithuanian National Union secured other major roles: Antanas Merkys assumed office as minister of defense and Ignas Musteikis as minister of the interior.

== Aftermath ==
The military claimed that their actions had prevented an imminent Bolshevik coup, allegedly scheduled for 20 December. Martial law was declared. About 350 communists were arrested, and four leaders (Karolis Požela, Juozas Greifenbergeris, Kazys Giedrys and Rapolas Čarnas) were executed on 27 December. This was a serious blow to the Communist Party of Lithuania and it was inactive for a time. No concrete evidence was ever found that the communists had planned any coups. Other political parties and organizations were not brutalized and, according to the military, no casualties were associated with the coup, apart from the four executions. However, other sources cite Captain Vincas Jonuška, allegedly shot by the guards of the Presidential Palace, who died a day later in a hospital.

International recognition of the new government did not prove difficult. Western powers were not pleased with the Third Seimas, which had ratified the non-aggression treaty with the Soviet Union in September. They were looking for a change in the priorities of Lithuanian foreign policy. It was therefore not surprising that the British, in The Daily Telegraph, the French, in Le Matin, and the United States, in The New York Times wrote that the coup was expected to curtail friendly relations with the Soviet Union and normalize relations with Poland; the anti-democratic and unconstitutional nature of the coup was not emphasized. The Western press reported the news calmly, or assessed it as a positive development in the Lithuanian struggle against Bolshevism. International diplomatic opinion held that a strong authoritarian leader would provide internal stability, and that even during the earlier years of the republic Lithuania had not been genuinely democratic, since many essential freedoms were curtailed under martial law.

Christian Democrats, believing that the coup was merely a temporary measure, demanded that new elections to the Seimas be held, but Smetona stalled. He predicted that his party would not be popular and that he would not be re-elected president. In the meantime, nationalists were discussing constitutional changes to increase the powers of the executive branch and curb the powers of the Seimas. In April, a group in the Lithuanian Popular Peasants' Union tried to organize a coup "to defend the constitution," but the plans were discovered and the rebels were arrested. Among the detainees was a member of the Seimas, Juozas Pajaujis. On 12 April 1927, the Seimas protested this arrest as a violation of parliamentary immunity by delivering a motion of no confidence in the Voldemaras government. Smetona, using his constitutional right to do so, dissolved the Seimas. The constitution was violated, however, when no new elections were held within two months. In April, Christian Democratic newspapers, which had been calling for new elections, were censored. On 2 May 1927, Christian Democrats withdrew from the government, thinking that the nationalists acting alone would not be able to sustain it. As a result, the Lithuanian National Union took the upper hand in its dispute with a much larger and influential rival and assumed absolute control of the state.

The 1926 coup was a major event in interwar Lithuania; the dictatorship went on for 14 years. In 1935, the Smetona government outlawed all other political parties. The coup continued to be a difficult issue for Lithuanians, since the Soviet Union went go on to describe its subsequent occupation of Lithuania as a liberation from fascism. Encyclopædia Britannica, however, describes the regime as authoritarian and nationalistic rather than fascist, a view not shared by historian Mindaugas Tamošaitis, who wrote in the Visuotinė lietuvių enciklopedija that "In the late 1930s, the younger generation that assuming leadership of the party proclaimed radical right-wing attitudes [such as] sympathy for Italian fascism, etc". The coup's apologists have described it as a corrective to an extreme form of parliamentarianism, justifiable in light of Lithuania's political immaturity.
