= Party of National Progress =

Party of National Progress Tautos pažangos partija
- Leader: Egidijus Klumbys
- Founded: 1916, 1994
- Dissolved: 2016
- Headquarters: Gynėjų g. 4-320, Vilnius
- Ideology: Agrarianism; Lithuanian nationalism National conservatism
- Political position: Right-wing

Website
- www.tpp.lt

The Party of National Progress (Lithuanian: Tautos pažangos partija) or TPP was a political party in Lithuania.

== History ==
It was established in 1916. The party was named by the prominent Lithuanian activist and writer Juozas Tumas-Vaižgantas, who regarded progress as the main aspect of future politics. The party published its main goals in 1917, while Lithuania was still part of the Russian Empire. They announced that the party regarded Lithuania as a democratic republic with rights to self determination. In late 1917 Alfonsas Petrulis, a member of the party, was elected into the Council of Lithuania. However, it failed to get any seats in the Constituent Assembly of Lithuania in 1920. It then merged with the Economic and Political Union of Lithuanian Farmers to form the Lithuanian Nationalist Union, a ruling party from 1926 to 1940. Lithuania regained its independence in 1990 and the party was re-established in 1994.

In 2016, the process of dissolving the party due to a lack of reports about its membership numbers was started.
