= First Seimas =

First Seimas of Lithuania
←	Constituent Assembly of Lithuania (as legislature)	Second Seimas	→
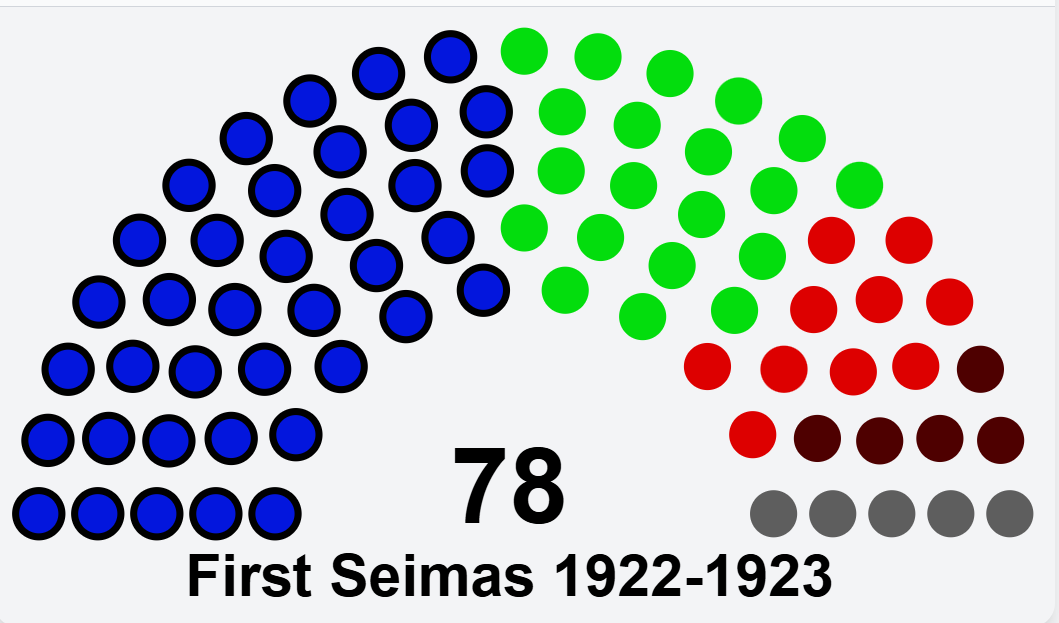

Overview
- Legislative body: Seimas
- Jurisdiction: Lithuania
- Term: 1922–1923

Summary results of 1922 parliamentary elections
Party	Seats
Christian Democratic Bloc (krikdemai)	38
Peasant Popular Union (liaudininkai)	20
Social Democrats (socdemai)	10
Workers' Group (communists)	5
Minorities (Jews and Poles)	5
Total	78

First Seimas of Lithuania was the first parliament (Seimas) democratically elected in Lithuania after it declared independence on February 16, 1918.

== History ==
The elections took place on October 10–11, 1922, to replace the Constituent Assembly, which adopted the final constitution on August 1, 1922. The Seimas elected Aleksandras Stulginskis as the President of Lithuania and Ernestas Galvanauskas, as the new Prime Minister, was entrusted to form a new cabinet of ministers. However, no coalition could muster a majority and the Seimas was in a deadlock: Galvanauskas formed two cabinets, and both got 38 votes for and against. As the Seimas could not continue in such manner, it was dissolved on March 12, 1923. New elections were held in May.

The Seimas was faced with two major international issues: negotiation over the Vilnius Region and the Klaipėda Region. On November 20, 1922, the Seimas authorized Klaipėda Revolt, which started in January. Klaipėda became autonomous region of Lithuania. On March 15, 1923, in part reacting to the January revolt the Conference of Ambassadors confirmed a new demarcation line between Poland and Lithuania and western powers considered Vilnius dispute settled despite Lithuanian protests.
