= Mykolas Krupavičius =

20th c. Lithuanian Roman Catholic priest and politician

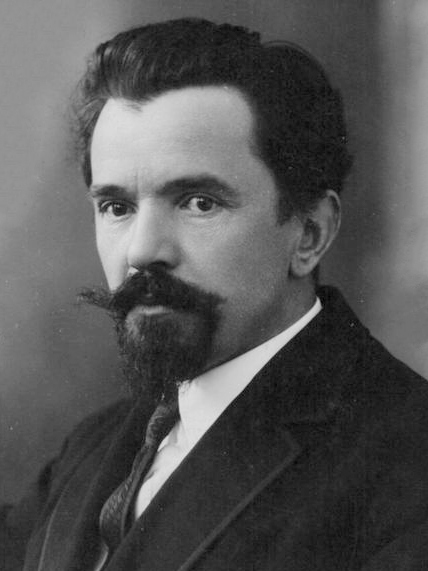
Mykolas Krupavičius in the 1930s

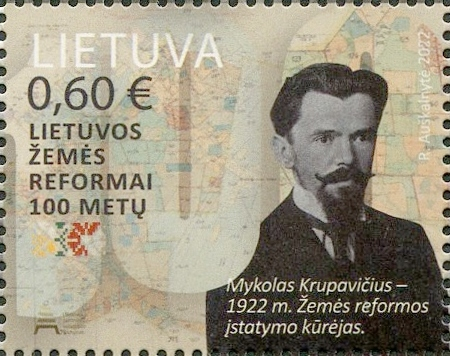
Krupavičius on a 2022 stamp of Lithuania

Mykolas Krupavičius (1 October 1885, Balbieriškis, Lithuania – 4 December 1970, Chicago, U.S.) was a Lithuanian priest and politician. He is best known for his involvement with the land reform in the interwar Lithuania.

In 1900 Krupavičius enrolled into the Veiveriai Teachers' Seminary. He showed interest in politics from early days: during the Russian Revolution of 1905 he was arrested twice. After graduation in 1905, he worked as a teacher in the Łomża Governorate and in Papilė. In 1908 Krupavičius began his theological studies at the Sejny Priest Seminary and continued them at the Saint Petersburg Roman Catholic Theological Academy. He was ordained into the priesthood in June 1914. After graduation in 1917, he worked as a chaplain at a Lithuanian school in Voronezh. At the same time he got involved with the Lithuanian Christian Democratic Party and was sentenced to death by the Bolshevik revolutionary court. Krupavičius escaped the arrest and returned to Lithuania in May 1918. He joined activities of the Council of Lithuania struggling to establish independent Lithuania. From the very beginning, he was heavily involved with the land reform.

Krupavičius was elected to all Seimas (parliament) and served as Minister of Agriculture from 1923 to 1926 in four different cabinets. After the 1926 Lithuanian coup d'état, the Lithuanian Nationalists Union usurped the political power and Krupavičius studied sociology, economics, and law at the Lille University and University of Toulouse for two years. Upon return in 1930 he resumed his duties as a priest and served Catholic congregations in Garliava, Veiveriai, and Kalvarija. During the occupation of Lithuania by Nazi Germany, Krupavičius together with Kazys Grinius and Jonas Pranas Aleksa sent a letter to the German authorities protesting their attempts to colonize Lithuania. Krupavičius was arrested and deported to Germany, where he was held under house arrest in a Carmelite monastery in Regensburg and then imprisoned in Bayreuth before being liberated by American troops in 1945. In 1945 he was elected as chairman of the Supreme Committee for the Liberation of Lithuania and served in such capacity for a decade. After the resignation he moved to the United States and largely retired from public life. Krupavičius published some 20 books on various topics in Lithuanian politics.

Krupavičius died in Chicago at age 85.
