= Lithuanian Christian Democratic Party =

Former political party in Lithuania

The Lithuanian Christian Democratic Party (Lithuanian: Lietuvos krikščionių demokratų partija, LKDP) was a Christian-democratic political party in Lithuania.

Performance in legislative election
Years	Seats in Seimas
1920–1922	24 seats (out of 100)
1922–1923	15 seats (out of 78)
1923–1926	14 seats (out of 78)
1926–1927	14 seats (out of 85)
1990–1992	2 seats (out of 141)
1992–1996	10 seats (out of 141)
1996–2000	16 seats (out of 141)
2000–2001	2 seats (out of 141)

== History ==
=== Russian Empire and Republic of Lithuania ===
A Christian Democratic movement was established in Lithuania in 1890 by a group of Roman Catholic clergy and intellectuals. It initially called for Lithuanian patriotism and the defence of the Catholic church in the face of the dominant Russian Orthodox Church. In 1904 it adopted social objectives, but also began to adopt anti-Polish and nationalist viewpoints.

The Lithuanian Christian Democratic Party (LKDP) was formally established in 1917, with its first congress held in Vilnius on 20 November 1918. It emerged as the largest party in the 1920 elections with 24 seats, and together with the Labour Federation and Farmers' Association, it formed the Christian Democratic Bloc, which together held 59 of the 112 seats.

The 1922 elections saw the LKDP remain the largest party, but the Bloc lost its majority, winning only 38 of the 78 seats. As a result it was forced to govern with the support of independents. In early elections in 1923 the Christian Democrats finished third, but the Bloc won 40 seats and were able to form a government without outside support.

The LKDP finished third again in the 1926 elections and the bloc won only 30 seats as the Labour Federation saw its support almost halve. As a result, the Lithuanian Popular Peasants' Union was able to form a government with the Social Democratic Party of Lithuania and the Farmers' Party. Following the 1926 coup, the LKDP supported the Antanas Smetona government, but joined the opposition in June 1927. Several party leaders were imprisoned in 1928, and the party was finally dissolved in November 1935.

=== Reestablishment and activities between 1989 and 2001 ===
The party was re-established in 1989, and won two seats in the 1990 Supreme Soviet elections. For the 1992 elections the LKDP ran in an alliance with the Lithuanian Union of Political Prisoners and Deportees and the Lithuanian Democratic Party. The LKDP won eight seats in the single-member constituencies, whilst the alliance won 18 seats in total and emerged as the third-largest faction in the Seimas. In 1993, the party joined the Christian Democrat International.

The party ran alone in the 1996 elections, winning 16 seats and becoming the second-largest party. Following the elections, it formed a coalition with the Homeland Union. However, the coalition broke up in June 1999. Eventually, the coalition was reestablished.

Between 1997 and 1998, internal conflicts came to the public. Conflicting sides were "moderns" (Feliksas Palubinskas, Egidijus Vareikis, Vytautas Bogušis, Algis Kašėta, Artūras Vazbys) and "conservatives" (Zigmas Zinkevičius, Petras Gražulis). After the 1998 congress, when Zigmas Zinkevičius became the new leader, the party had split. In 1998, "moderns" established new party, Modern Christian-Democratic Union, which joined ranks with the New Union (Social Liberals), the Liberal Union of Lithuania and the Lithuanian Centre Union by the summer of 2000.

In 1998, the LKDP became an associated member of the European People's Party. After winning only two seats in the 2000 elections, the party merged with the Christian Democratic Union in 2001 to form the Lithuanian Christian Democrats. A faction opposed to the merger formed a new party, the Lithuanian Christian Democracy Party, chaired by Zigmas Zinkevičius.

== Sources ==
- McHale, Vincent E. (1983). Political parties of Europe. Greenwood Press. ISBN 0-313-23804-9.
