= Vilkaviškis Priest Seminary =

Coordinates: 54°33′21″N 23°20′41″E

Vilkaviškis Blessed Jurgis Matulaitis Priest Seminary (Lithuanian: Vilkaviškio Palaimintojo Jurgio Matulaičio kunigų seminarija) was a Roman Catholic priest seminary of the Diocese of Vilkaviškis. It continued the traditions of the Sejny Priest Seminary, established in 1826 and expelled from Sejny in 1919 due to the Polish–Lithuanian War. It became known as Vilkaviškis Priest Seminary in 1926 when the Diocese of Vilkaviškis was established. It was based in Gižai (1926–1930) and Vilkaviškis (1930–1944). After the Soviet occupation in 1940, the seminary was closed for a year. It was closed again in 1944. It was reestablished in Marijampolė in 1999 as a branch of the Faculty of Catholic Theology of Vytautas Magnus University, but was closed due to a very low number of students in 2005.

== History ==
=== Establishment ===
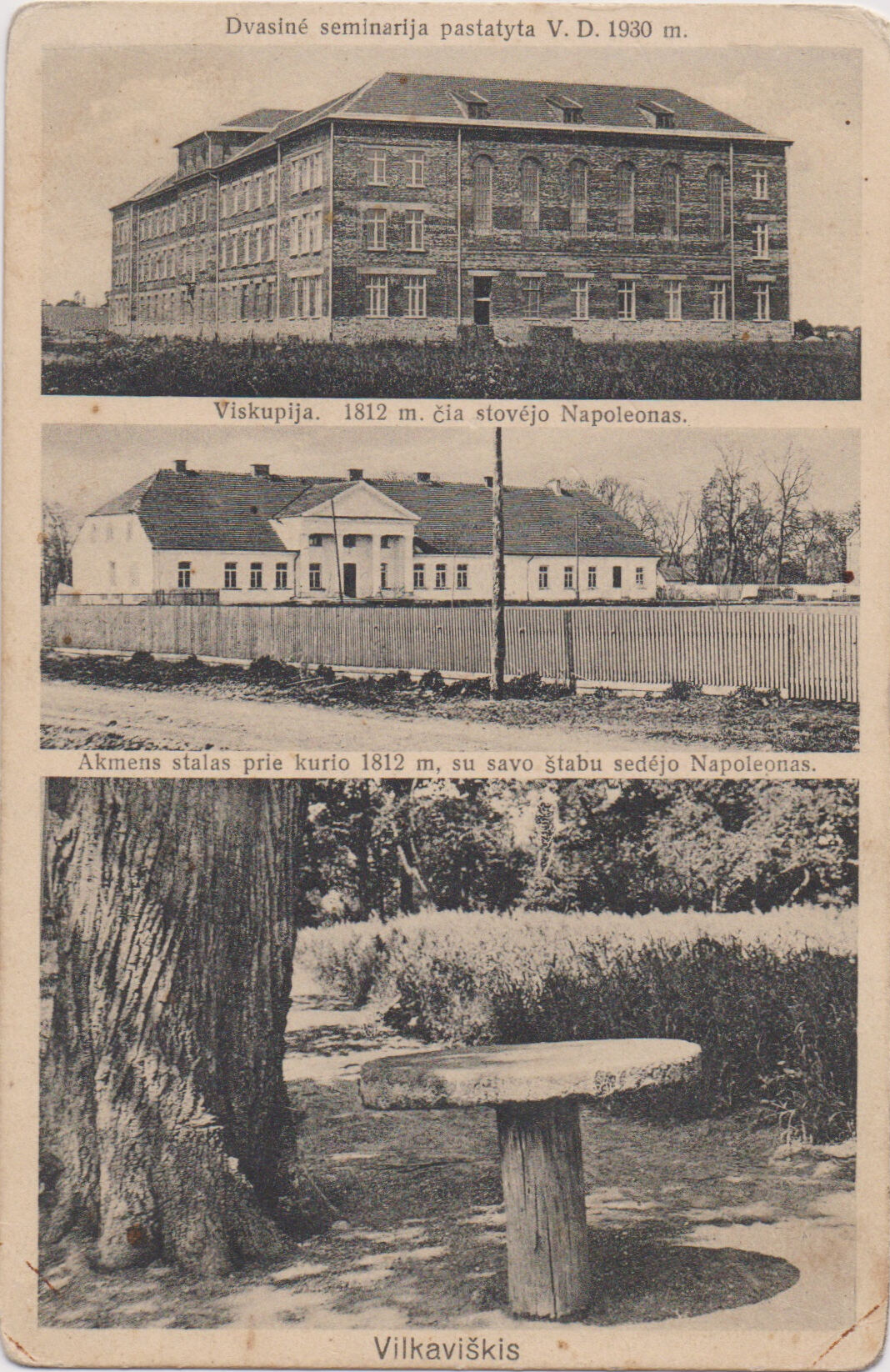
Interwar postcard with the seminary's building in Vilkaviškis at the top

The seminary traces its origins to the Sejny Priest Seminary established in 1826. During the Sejny Uprising, Sejny was captured by Poland in August 1919. As a result, Lithuanian activities in the town were suppressed. Poles expelled bishop of Sejny Antanas Karosas and the priest seminary. The seminary evacuated to Lithuania where it temporarily was based in Zypliai Manor. In 1922, it moved to Gižai Manor where conditions were better and it was closer to Vilkaviškis and Marijampolė. The manor was purchased by the agricultural Žagrė Society in 1912 with plans of establishing an agricultural school. The seminary constructed a new brick building for its needs, but it was not sufficient.

The papal bull Lithuanorum Gente issued on 4 April 1926 established the Lithuanian ecclesiastical province. Most of Suvalkija became part of the newly established Diocese of Vilkaviškis. As a result, the seminary became known as Vilkaviškis Priest Seminary (it continued to use Sejny name before). In 1930, the seminary moved to Vilkaviškis were larger premises were built near the new cathedral. It was a three-storey building, the largest residential building in the entire diocese, surrounded by a large garden.

The students were required to obtain at least 6th grade gymnasium education before applying to the seminary. The education lasted six years, which included two years on general subjects and four years on theology.

=== World War II ===
The seminary was closed shortly after the Soviet occupation in June 1940. Its building was taken over by the Red Army. A year later, at the start of the German invasion of the Soviet Union, Vilkaviškis was bombed by the German air force. The seminary building was ravaged by the Red Army – heating, water, sewer no longer functioned. Despite the destruction, the seminary was reestablished on 14 September 1941. The students temporarily occupied former quarters of manor workers while teachers took over the clergy house. The seminary was later able to return to the second floor of its building (two other floors were used by the Germans).

As the front approached at the end of 1944, about a hundred priests from the Diocese of Vilkaviškis retreated west to Germany (for comparison, there were 247 priests in the diocese in 1940). A number of seminary's students gathered at Collegium Willibaldinum in Eichstätt to continue theirs studies. In 1945, there were 85 Lithuanian students at Willibaldinum. The seminary in Vilkaviškis was closed by the Soviets and the remaining students transferred to Kaunas Priest Seminary.

=== Reestablishment ===
After Lithuania regained independence in 1990, bishop Juozas Žemaitis announced the reestablishment of the seminary on 18 May 1997 (the Pentecost). It opened in September 1999 in Marijampolė and was named after blessed Jurgis Matulaitis. It became a branch of the Faculty of Catholic Theology of Vytautas Magnus University thus seminary's students graduated with bachelor's degrees from the university. In 2003, the seminary was reorganized as a department of the Faculty of Catholic Theology. However, the number of students at the seminary steadily declined from 47 in 2001 to 24 in 2005. As a result, in summer 2005, the seminary was closed and its students were moved to the Kaunas Priest Seminary.

== Personnel ==
Number of students
Year	Students
1926	66
1928	61
1930	59
1932	75
1934	66
1935	54
1937	63
1939	66
1940	62
1942	76
1944	40

Seminary's rectors were:

- Jonas Naujokas (1926–1938).
- Feliksas Bartkus (1938–1944)
- Kęstutis Žemaitis (1997–2005)

Seminary's professors included:

- Vincentas Borisevičius
- Vincentas Brizgys (also alumni)
- Justinas Dabrila
- Mykolas Krupavičius
- Vincentas Padolskis (also alumni)
- Mečislovas Reinys
- Ladas Tulaba (also alumni)
- Vincentas Vizgirda

Students included philosopher Antanas Maceina.

== Premises ==
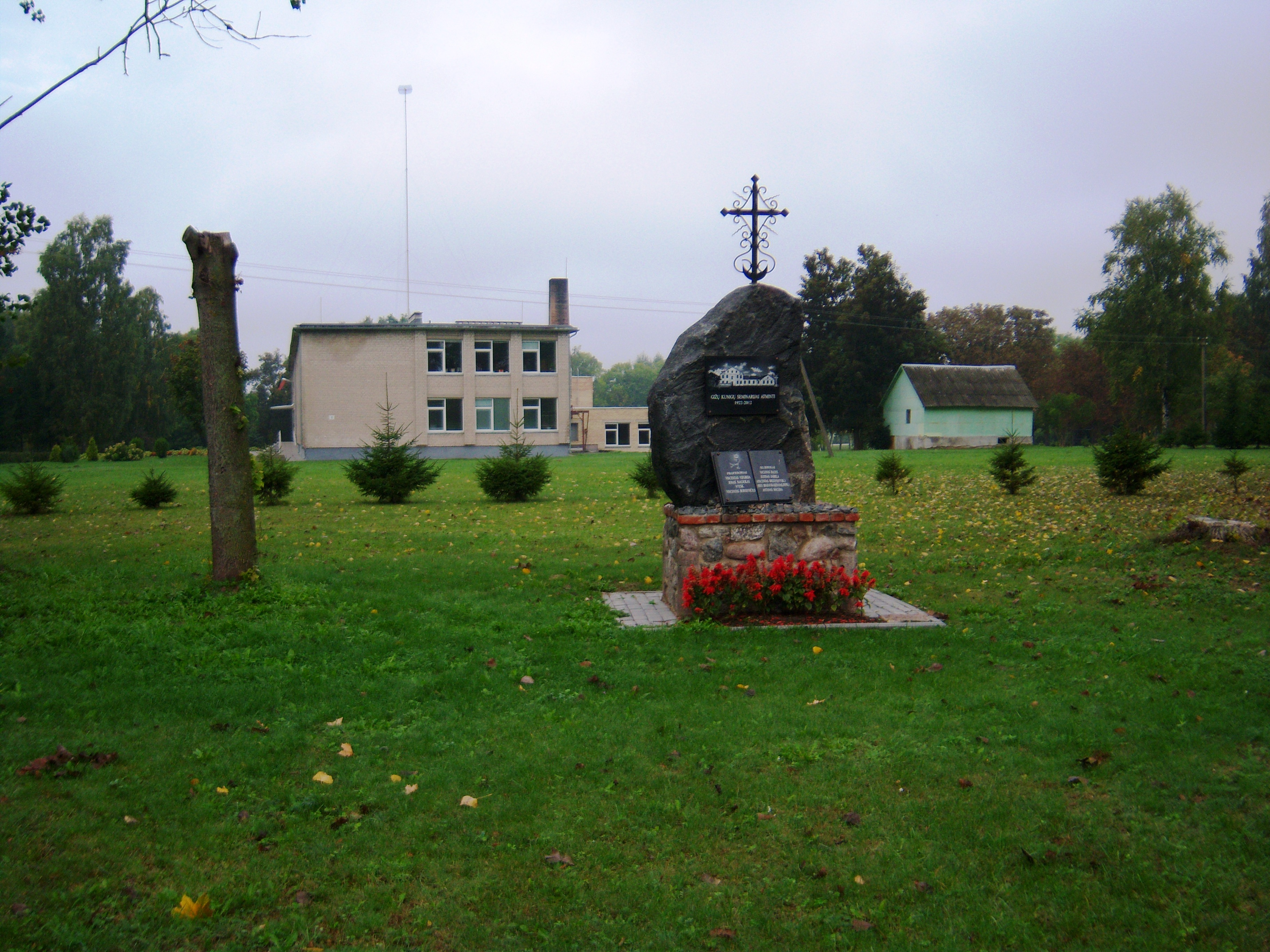
Memorial stone in Gižai commemorating the seminary

Seminary's premises in Gižai were used for a secondary school until 1968. It continued to house school's ancillary offices (canteen, library, dormitory) until 1985. Since the building was dilapidated and unsafe, it was demolished in 1989. In 2012, the 90th anniversary of the seminary's relation to Gižai, the community erected a memorial stone to commemorate the former seminary.

The seminary building in Vilkaviškis was built by 1930 based on the design of architect Vytautas Landsbergis-Žemkalnis. In 1955, the building was given to a garment company which remains one of the largest employers in Vilkaviškis. The building was added to the Registry of Cultural Property in 1992.

The reestablished seminary searched for new premises. It considered several options – an old Dominican monastery in Liškiava but it was too far from the seat of the diocese; Paežeriai Manor which used to be owned by Jonas Vailokaitis and offered as a donation by his heirs to the diocese, but the government did not approve the plan; Marijampolė Drama Theater; a new construction. Eventually, it settled on renting part of the monastery of the Congregation of Marian Fathers of the Immaculate Conception in Marijampolė.

== Bibliography ==
- Aleksa, Valentinas (15 January 2025). "Feliksas Bartkus". Visuotinė lietuvių enciklopedija (in Lithuanian). Mokslo ir enciklopedijų leidybos centras.
- Bartusevičius, Vincas (2012). Lietuviai DP stovyklose Vokietijoje, 1945–1951 (in Lithuanian). Versus aureus. ISBN 978-9955-34-375-2.
- "Vilkaviškis Blessed Jurgis Matulaitis' Seminary". Catholic Internet Service. 2005. Archived from the original on 13 August 2018.
- Katilius, Algimantas (2016). "Punsko parapijos dvasininkai XIX a.–XX a. pradžia" (PDF). Terra jatwezenorum (in Lithuanian). 8 (1): 108–142. ISSN 2080-7589.
- Kviklys, Bronius (1982). Lietuvos bažnyčios (in Lithuanian). Vol. 2. Vilkaviškio vyskupija. Chicago: Amerikos lietuvių bibliotekos leidykla.
- "Vilkaviškio Kunigų seminarijos pastatų komplekso kunigų seminarijos pastatas". Kultūros vertybių registras (in Lithuanian). Kultūros paveldo departamentas.
- Laukaitytė, Regina (2010). Lietuvos bažnyčios vokiečių okupacijos metais (1941–1944) (in Lithuanian). Vilnius: Lietuvos istorijos instituto leidykla. ISBN 9789955847274.
- Nenėnienė, Birutė (13 July 2012). "Paminklas įamžino seminarijos atminimą". XXI amžius (in Lithuanian). Vol. 8, no. 2003.
- Vabalienė, Laima (21 October 2009). "Įtraukė į valstybės saugomų objektų sąrašą" (in Lithuanian). Santaka.
- "Vilkaviškio siuvimo fabrikas AB "Žemkalnija" (Vilkaviškio kunigų seminarija)". Vilkaviškio krašto e-etnografija (in Lithuanian). Vilkaviškio rajono savivaldybės viešoji biblioteka.
- "Vilkaviškis – vienas senesnių Sūduvos miestų" (in Lithuanian). Vilkaviškio rajono savivaldybė.
- "Vyskupijos istorija" (in Lithuanian). Vilkaviškio vyskupija.
- "Vilkaviškio Palaimintojo Jurgio Matulaičio kunigų seminarija". Visuotinė lietuvių enciklopedija (in Lithuanian). Mokslo ir enciklopedijų leidybos centras. 23 December 2022 [2019].
- Vyšniauskas, Vidmantas (2016). "Seinų-Vilkaviškio kunigų seminarija Gižuose: veikla ir palikimas". Terra Jatwezenorum (in Lithuanian). 8 (1): 234–250. ISSN 2080-7589.
- Žemaitis, Kęstutis (2002). "Vilkaviškio kunigų seminarijos profesūra: pedagoginė ir mokslinė veikla" (PDF). Soter (in Lithuanian). 7 (35): 67–74. ISSN 2335-8785.
- Žemaitis, Kęstutis (2013). "Kunigų seminarijos Marijampolėje atkūrimas: tarp Seinų dvasios ir dabarties aktualijų". Terra Jatwezenorum (in Lithuanian). 5: 238–245. ISSN 2080-7589.
- Žemaitis, Kęstutis (July–September 2022). "The Seminary in Marijampolė: Re-Establishment". Logos. 112: 209–215. ISSN 0868-7692.
