= Manuel María de Peralta y Alfaro =

Costa Rican diplomat and historian

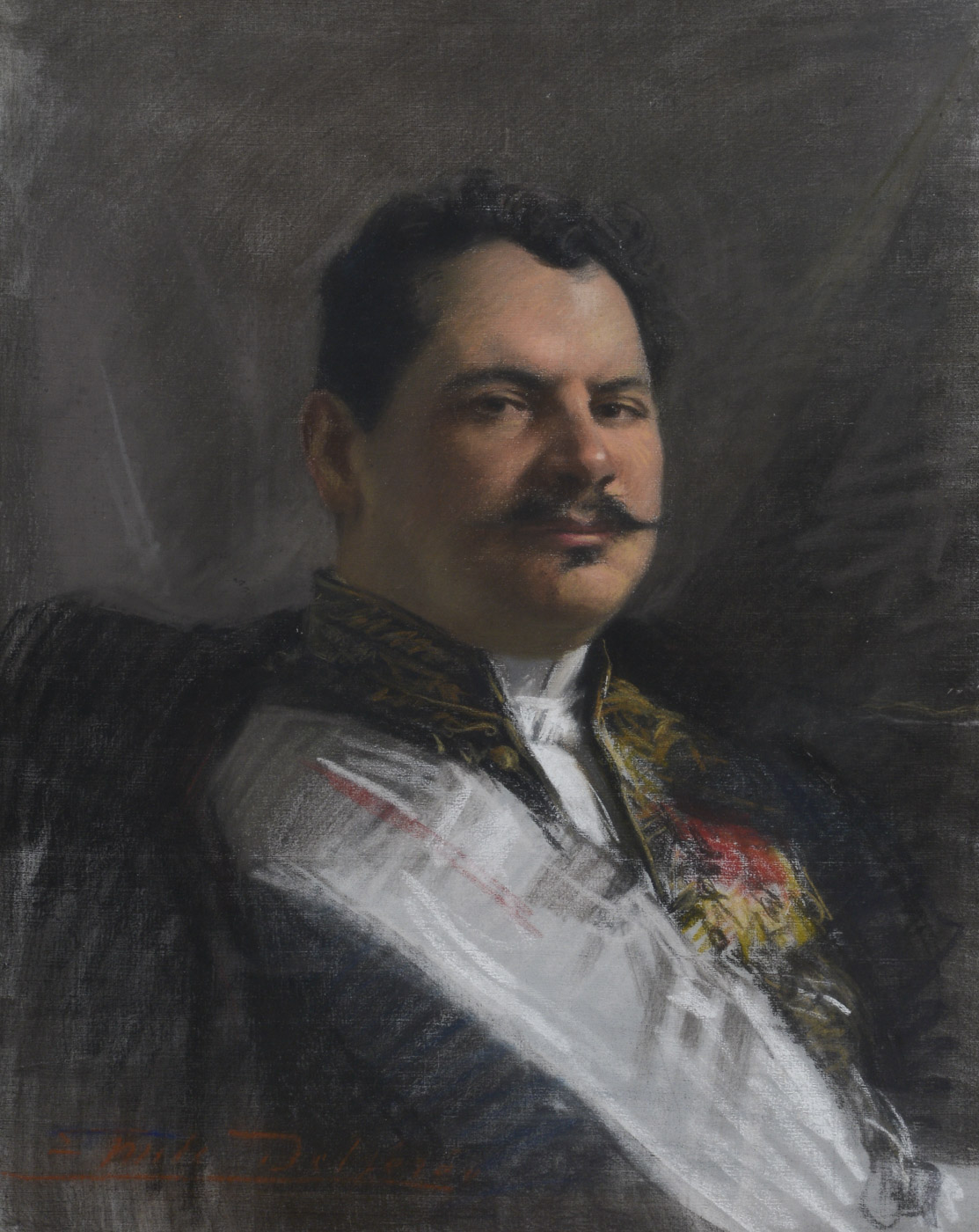
Portrait of Manuel María de Peralta y Alfaro, second Marquis of Peralta, by Belgian artist Émile Delperée (1850–1896)

Manuel María de Peralta y Alfaro (July 4, 1847 – August 1, 1930) was a Costa Rican diplomat and historian. De Peralta y Alfaro was born in Taras, Cartago, Costa Rica, on July 4, 1847. He was the only Costa Rican to ever be given the designation of "Hero of the Motherland" twice.

== Biography ==
Manuel was born to Bernardino de Peralta and Alvarado and Ana de Jesus Alfaro Lobo on July 4, 1847. He was the paternal grandson of José María de Peralta, president of Costa Rica in 1822, who signed the Declaration of Independence and Benefactor of the Fatherland. De Peralta y Alfaro married in 1884 to the Belgian countess Jehanne de Clérembault de Soer (1845-1919), Dowager Marchioness Gontaut Biron, who was also a cousin Ferdinand de Lesseps.

== Studies ==
De Peralta y Alfaro completed his first studies in Carthage and graduated with a Bachelor of Philosophy and subsequently earned a law degree from the University of Santo Tomas. Whilst in Europe he also studied International Law and other disciplines. He acquired a good knowledge of such languages as French, German, Italian, Portuguese, Greek and Latin.

== Diplomatic career ==
He was a representative of Costa Rica in Geneva, Switzerland. In November 1897 he formally began his diplomatic service in November 1871 as Secretary of the Legation of Costa Rica in France. He was Minister Resident of Costa Rica in the United States (1875-1885) and Minister Plenipotentiary of Costa Rica in Germany (1887-1918), Belgium (1880-1883 and 1887-1930), France (1879-1883 and 1887 - 1930), Spain (1880-1883 and 1887-1930), the United States (1885-1887), the United Kingdom (1887-1898), the Netherlands (1910-1930) and the Holy See (1902-1930), and delegate from Costa Rica in the League of Nations (1921-1927). He was also Financial Agent of Costa Rica in the United Kingdom and Minister Plenipotentiary of El Salvador in the United States in 1886.

It fell defending the rights' land of Costa Rica at the arbitration dispute with Colombia, first to the Crown of Spain and then to the Presidents of France Félix Faure and Emil Loubet. He received high honors from many countries, including the Legion of Honor of France. On 4 July 1997, upon completion of the sesquicentennial of his birth, the Government of Costa Rica posthumously awarded the rank of Ambassador Emeritus.

== Activities as a historian and academic ==
He wrote several important historical works and collections rich documentaries published. His major works include The Republic of Costa Rica, Costa Rica, Nicaragua and Panama in the sixteenth century, Costa Rica and Colombia from 1573 to 1581, its jurisdiction and territorial limits of the Panama Canal Nicaragua and Costa Rica in 1620 and 1887 Limits of Costa Rica and Colombia; History of the territorial jurisdiction of the Republic of Costa Rica, Costa Rica, the Mosquito Coast, Historical Atlas of the Republic of Costa Rica, and Veragua Mosquito Coast, territorial jurisdiction of the Republic of Costa Rica, El General Morazan and several poems and essays. He belonged to numerous academies and research companies and had close friendships with distinguished writers and intellectuals, including Juan Montalvo, Emilia Pardo Bazán and Rubén Darío .

== Marquess of Peralta ==
In 1883 sought and obtained the transfer in favor of the Marquis de Peralta, Holy Roman title granted in 1738 by Emperor Charles VI to his uncle's great great grandfather Juan Tomás de Peralta y Franco de Medina. He was the second and last holder of the title.

== Awards ==
He was declared a Hero of the Nation by the Congress of Costa Rica in 1919 and 1927 .

== Death ==
He died in Paris, France, on 1 August 1930. His remains were brought to Costa Rica's capital and was buried there. The Diplomatic Institute of the Foreign Ministry of Costa Rica and an avenue in the city of San Jose are named after him.

== The Prize "Manuel Maria de Peralta" ==
The Prize "Manuel Maria de Peralta" is a recognition given by the Costa Rican Association of International Law "Philip C. Jessup" (ACODI) annually to a distinguished Costa Rican for their contributions to international law, the International Policy and Diplomacy.

The Prize has been awarded so far, in its fourteen editions to the following persons:

- Mr. Fernando Volio Jimenez (qdDg)
- Dr. Fabio Fournier Jimenez (qdDg)
- Carlos José Gutiérrez Gutiérrez, (qdDg)
- Lic. Elisabeth Odio Benito
- Lic. Sonia Picado Sotela
- Dr. Rodolfo Piza Escalante (qdDg)
- Mr. Rodrigo Madrigal Nieto (qdDg)
- Dr. Gonzalo J. Facio Segreda
- Dr. Óscar Arias Sánchez
- Mr. José Luis Quesada Molina
- Manuel Ventura Robles
- Dr. Bernd H. Niehaus Quesada
- Edgar Ugalde Álvarez, Ambassador
- Mr. Rodrigo Oreamuno White

The Prize is named in reference to Manuel Maria de Peralta y Alfaro and the Foreign Service Institute "Manuel Maria de Peralta" the Ministry of Foreign Affairs and Worship of Costa Rica.
