= Jonas Lapėnas =

Lithuanian businessman (1891–1937)

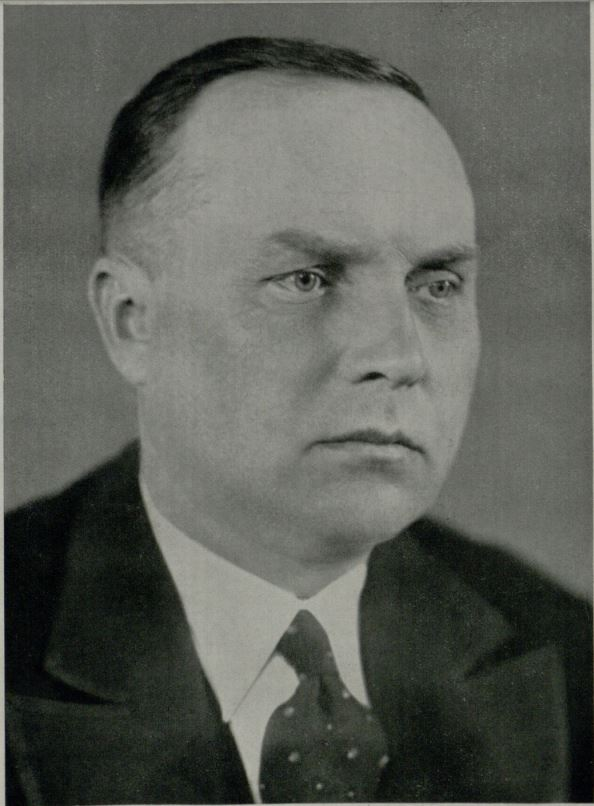
- Born: 5 August 1891; Dagilynė, Russian Empire
- Died: 27 July 1937 (aged 45); Žiegždriai, Lithuania
- Occupation: Businessman
- Political party: Lithuanian Nationalist Union

Jonas Lapėnas (5 August 1891 – 27 June 1937) was a Lithuanian businessman and activist of the Lithuanian Nationalist Union. He was director of the meat processing and export company Maistas and chairman of the cooperative union Lietūkis. He was chairman of the Nationalist Union in 1929–1931.

Born to a family of poor farm workers, Lapėnas did not receive any formal education. He became involved with trade and cooperatives from an early age. Acquaintance with Vladas Mironas, a close friend of President Antanas Smetona, helped Lapėnas launch his career within the Nationalist Union. He became chairman of the union, but was demoted due to disagreements with Smetona over the party's role in the Lithuanian government.

In September 1935, Lapėnas was arrested on corruption charges because Maistas sold meat to a shop owned by his brother at prices far below the market. District court sentenced him to eight years in prison and ordered him to pay a restitution of 500,000 Lithuanian litas. He appealed and was posthumously acquitted by the Supreme Tribunal of Lithuania.

== Biography ==
=== Early life ===
Jonas Lapėnas was born on 5 August 1891 in Dagilynė near Pasvalys in present-day northern Lithuania. His parents were likely poor farm workers at the Dagilynė Manor which was owned by Otto von der Ropp. Lapėnas did not receive any formal education. From an early age, he showed interest in trade. It is known that at the age of 13 he traded in Pumpėnai, at the age of 16 he headed a cooperative in Ariogala and later in Plungė. In 1912, he worked at Žagrė Society, an agricultural cooperative, in Kalvarija. During World War I, he traded independently and owned a bookshop.

During the Lithuanian War of Independence, he moved to Daugai where he served as town's military commandant. For that, he was arrested by the Bolsheviks during the Lithuanian–Soviet War and held in Lukiškės Prison. In Daugai, he met parish priest Vladas Mironas. Together, they established a local cooperative for farmers which was headed by Lapėnas.

In early 1920s, Lapėnas was interested in performing arts. He was one of the co-founders of Vilkolakis Theatre and for a time sang in the choir of the Opera Theatre (merged into the Kaunas State Musical Theatre).

=== Nationalist Union ===
Mironas was a close friend of President Antanas Smetona and an influential figure in the Lithuanian Nationalist Union. Via this connection, Lapėnas joined the Nationalist Union in 1925 and became director of Maistas in 1926. Maistas purchased meat (mainly pigs) from farmers for processing and export. The company was originally established by Jonas Vailokaitis and others in 1923, but it suffered substantial losses and was nationalized in 1925. He was also chairman of the cooperative union Lietūkis as well as a board member of the Cooperative Bank, Lietuvos muilas (Lithuanian soap), and other enterprises.

Lapėnas was also active in the Nationalist Union. He was union's vice-chairman and one of the founders of Pažanga publishing house which published the official daily Lietuvos aidas and other publications of the Nationalist Union. He was listed as the responsible editor of union's magazine Vairas though it was actually edited by others.

Lapėnas was elected chairman of the Nationalist Union in October 1929, replacing Vytautas Vileišis who became the Minister of Communications. At the time, the Nationalist Union was experiencing an internal crisis with the ouster of Prime Minister Augustinas Voldemaras and struggle for loyalty within the Iron Wolf organization. Lapėnas thought that the Nationalist Union should become a ruling party and a deciding voice in state affairs. Effectively, he wanted to make state institutions subordinate to the party. President Smetona disagreed and Lapėnas was removed as union's chairman on 1 June 1931.

=== Trial ===
Lapėnas was arrested on 13 September 1935 (during the farmer's strike in Suvalkija) for corruption. Lapėnas' brother Petras and his wife Konstancija were also charged.

Maistas owned a slaughterhouse in Tauragė. Slaughterhouses sold leftover meat in local shops usually owned by Maistas. In Tauragė, the excess meat was sold exclusively to a shop in Panemunė where many Germans shopped since it sold much cheaper meat and it was a quick trip across the Queen Louise Bridge from Tilsit in East Prussia. The shop was owner by Lapėnas' brother Petras. The prosecutors alleged that the slaughterhouse sold meat to Lapėnas' shop at much reduced prices. The slaughterhouse sold not just excess meat, but full pigs that should have been exported to foreign markets. The prosecutors computed total damages to Maistas at 825,000 Lithuanian litas.

In April 1936, Šiauliai District Court sentenced him to eight years in prison and ordered him to repay 500,000 litas to Maistas. Appeals Court acquitted him, but the Supreme Tribunal of Lithuania sent it back for retrial. He died in July 1937 in a manor that he purchased in Žiegždriai. He was posthumously acquitted by the Supreme Tribunal.

== Lapėnas' house ==
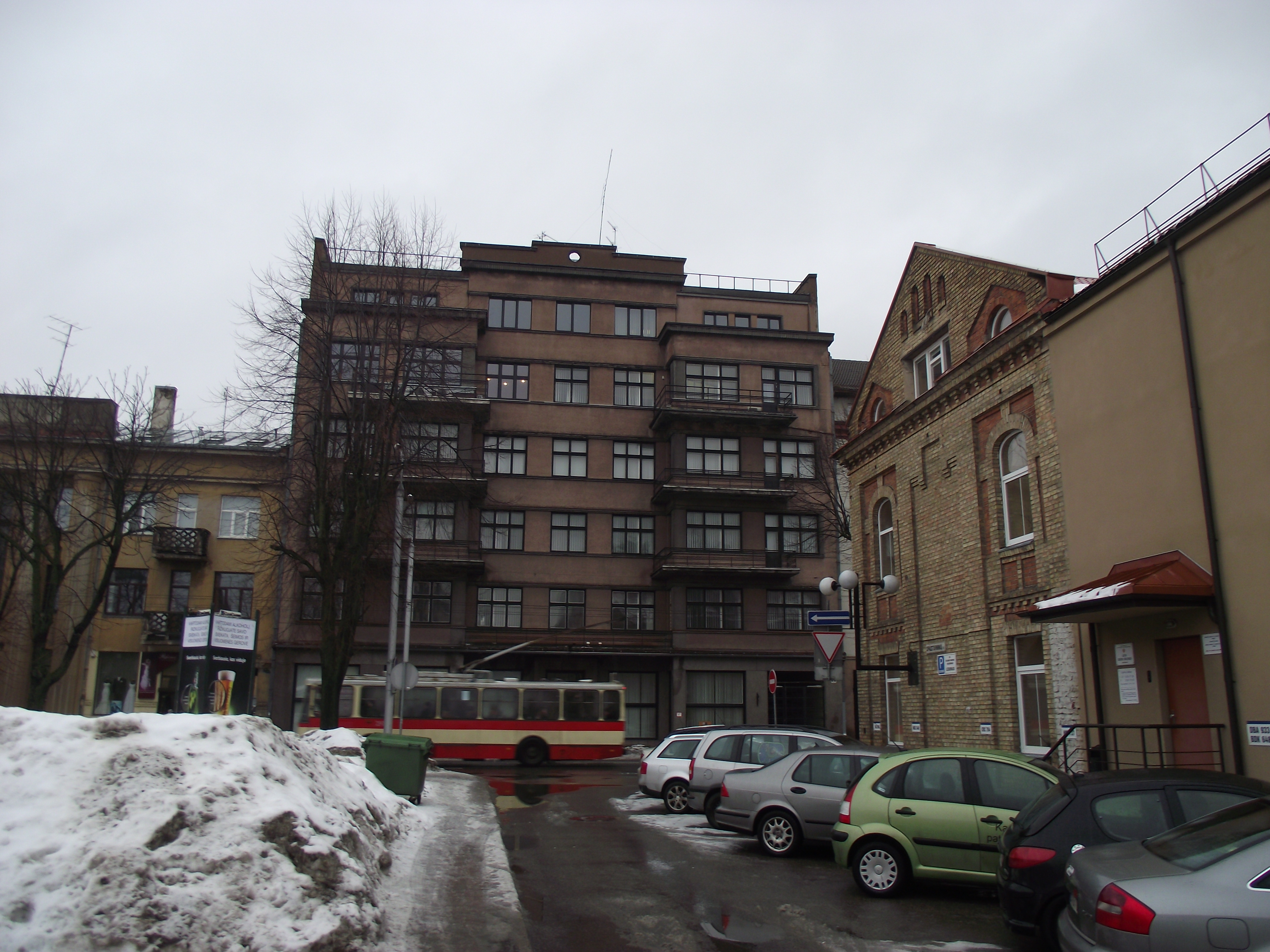
Lapėnas' house in 2011

In 1932, Lapėnas built a modernist six-floor building by architect Feliksas Vizbaras at the center of Kaunas (present-day Kęstučio g. 38). The first floor had shops, other floors had two luxurious five-room apartments each, while the top floor was a common area for the residents. It was the largest apartment building in Kaunas at the time of its completion. The building had modern conveniences: central heating and water, a sewage system, and two elevators. The house is symmetrical with a double (main and service) staircase in the middle. The staircase is contained in a semi-circular volume that dominates the rear façade.

In 2015, 44 modernist buildings in Kaunas (including Lapėnas' house) were awarded the European Heritage Label.
