= Lukšiai =

- Town
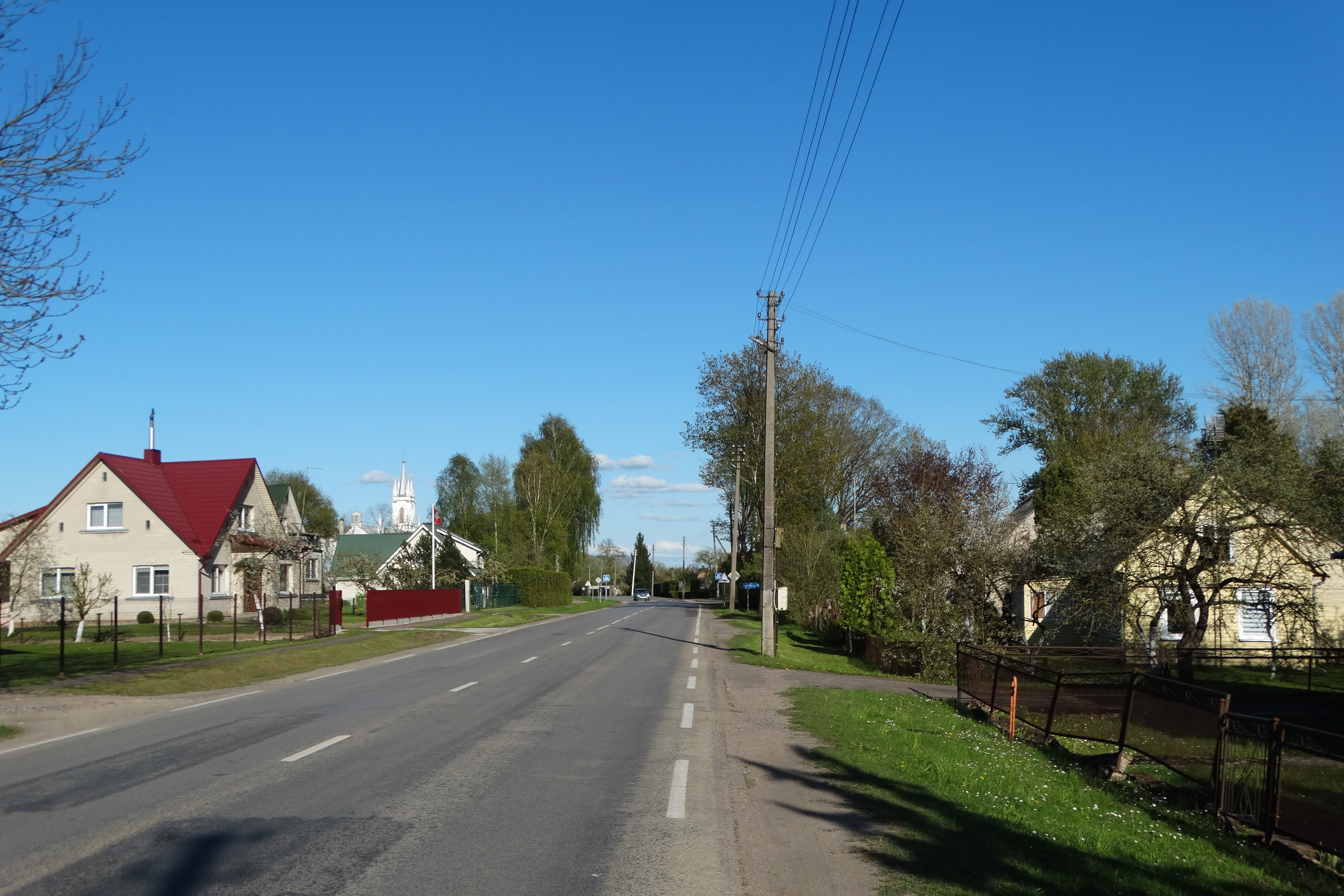
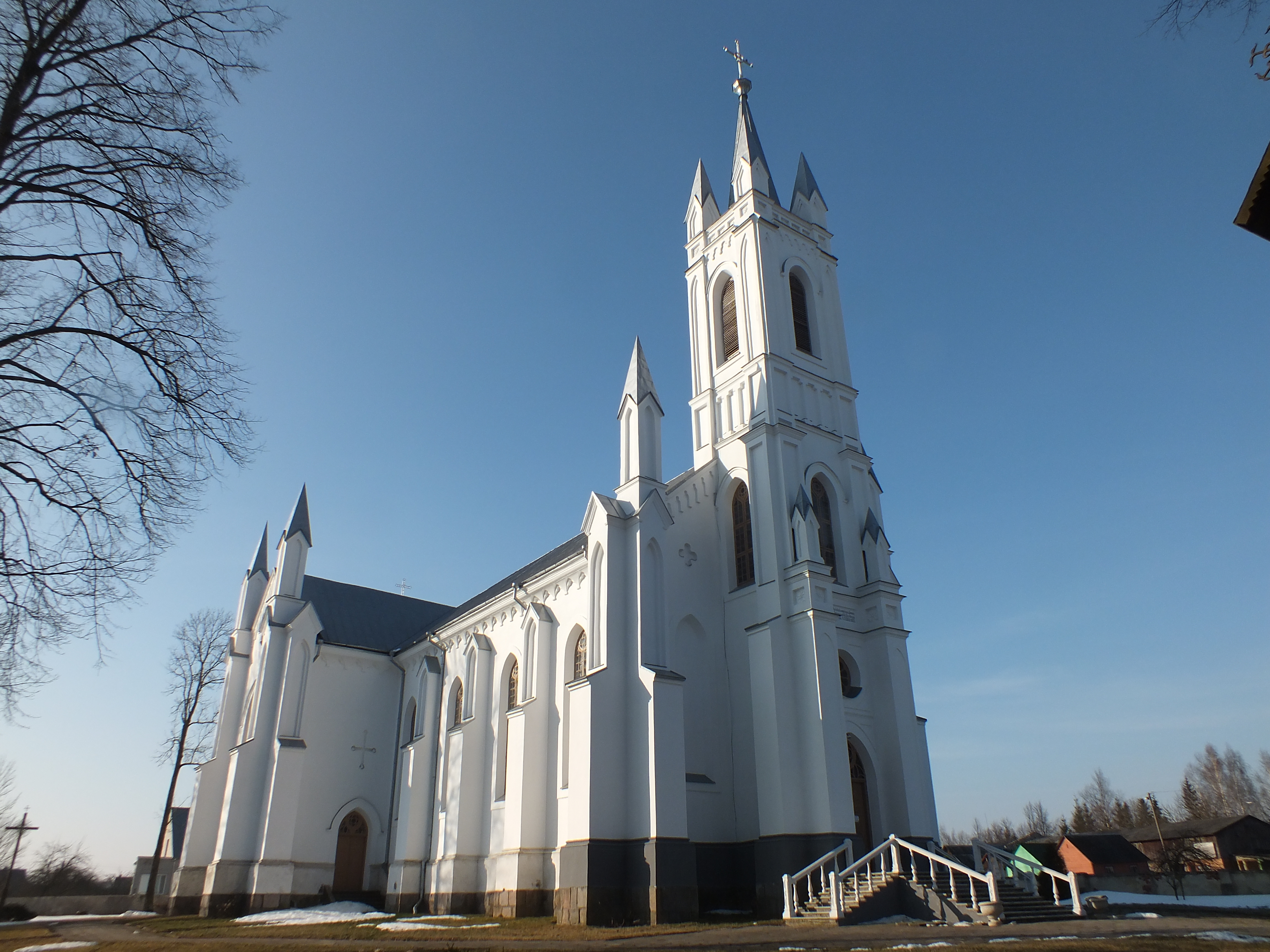
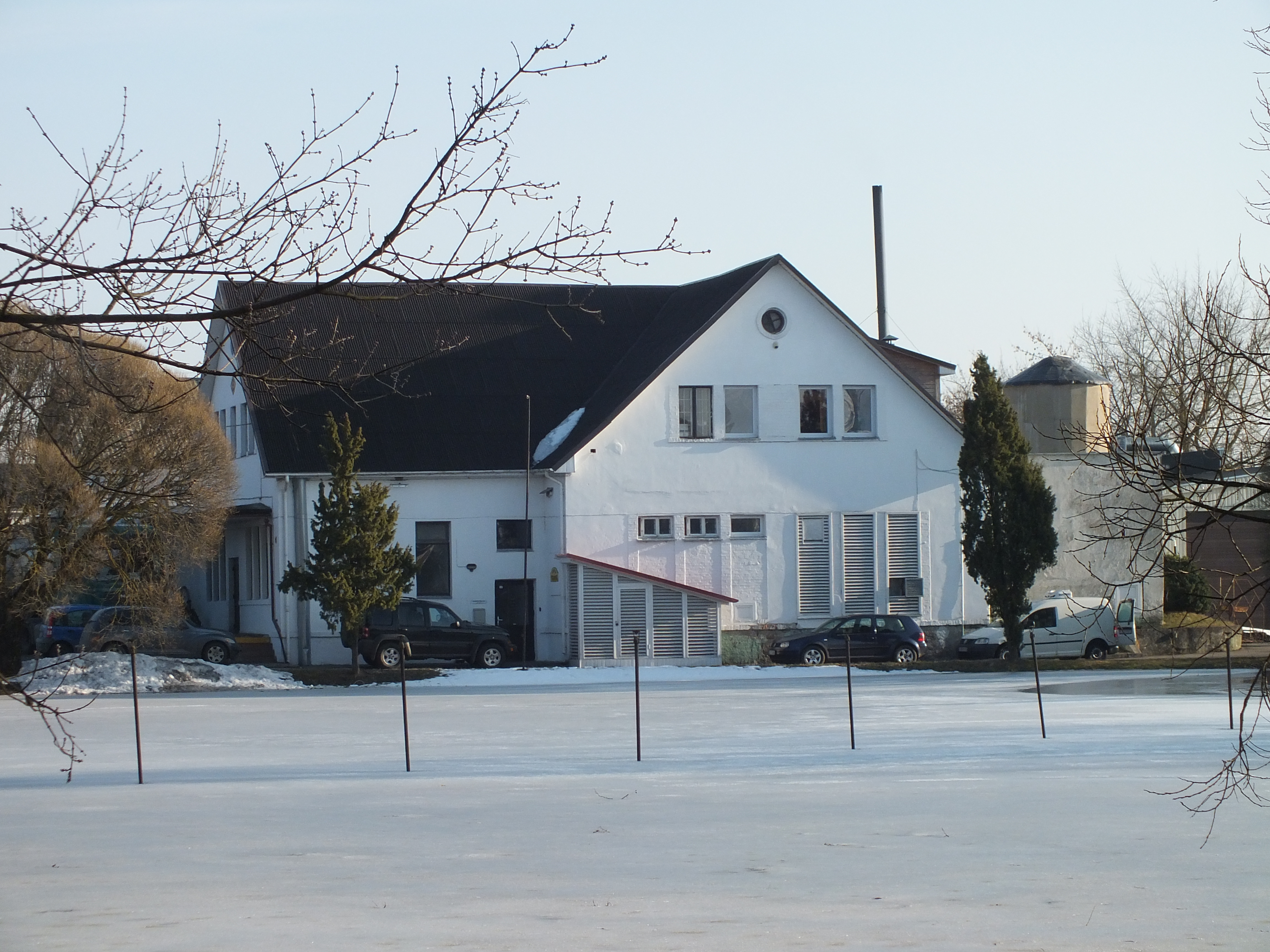
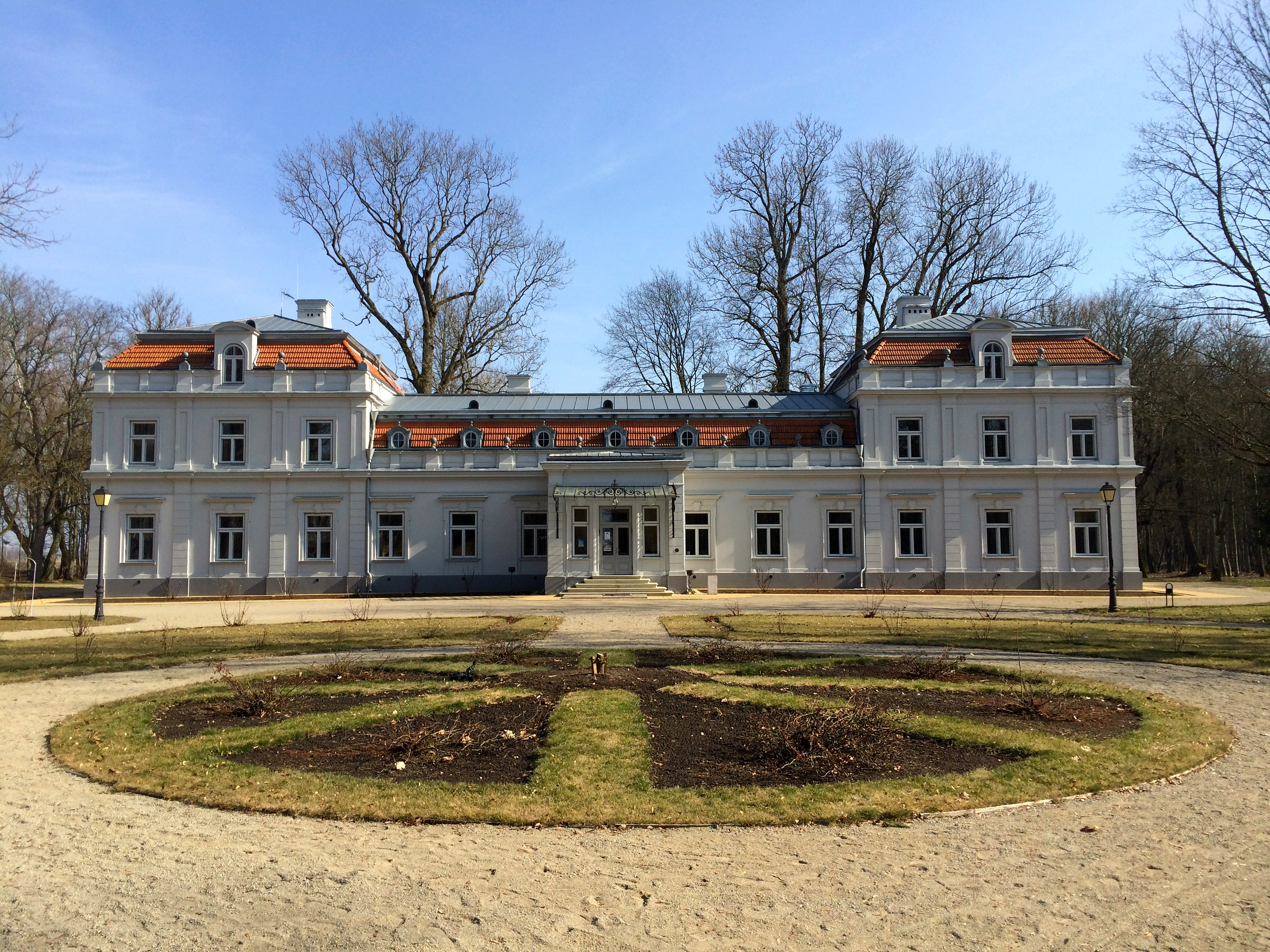
- Main street St. Joseph Church Lukšiai Diary Zypliai Manor near the town

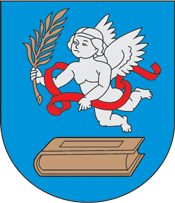
- Seal

- Location within Lithuania
- Coordinates: 54°57′0″N 23°10′12″E
- Country: Lithuania
- County: Marijampolė County

Population (2011)
  - Total: 1,485
- Time zone: UTC+2 (EET)
  - Summer (DST): UTC+3 (EEST)

Lukšiai is a town in Marijampolė County, in southwestern Lithuania. According to the 2011 census, the town has a population of 1,485 people.

Frank Lubin, a 1936 Summer Olympics and EuroBasket 1939 champion, who is nicknamed as 'Godfather of Basketball' in Lithuania, intended to settle in the land of his father, Konstantinas Lubinas, in the surroundings of Lukšiai, however the World War II changed his plans.
