= Zypliai Manor =

Manor house in Lithuania

Coordinates: 54°56′2.5″N 23°11′41″E

- Zyplių dvaras
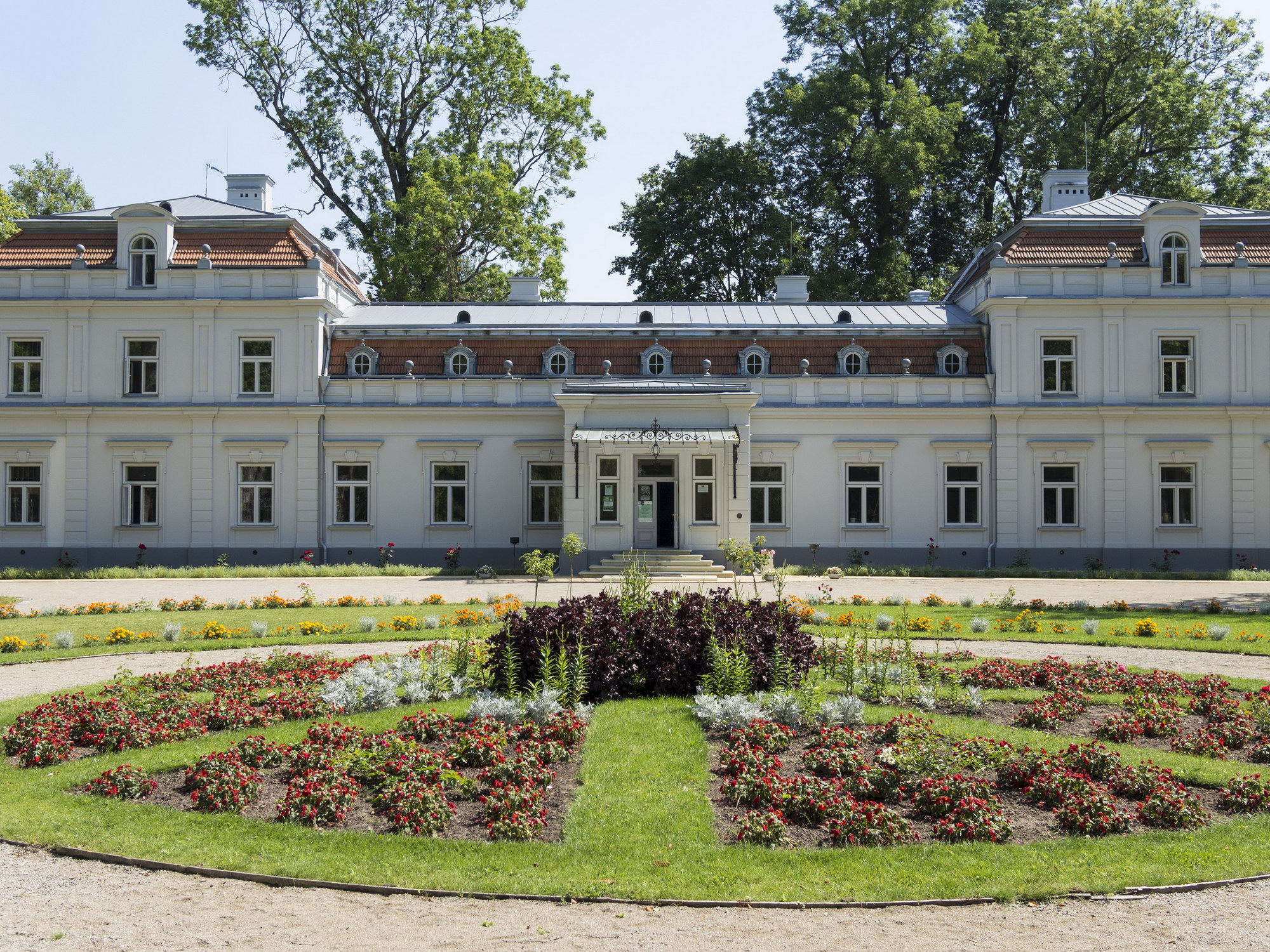
- Reconstructed Zypliai Manor (2014)
- Interactive map of the Zypliai Manor area

General information
- Architectural style: Classical
- Location: Tubeliai, Lukšiai Eldership, Šakiai District Municipality, Marijampolė County, Lithuania
- Year built: 19th century

Zypliai Manor (Lithuanian: Zyplių dvaras) is a former Tyszkiewicz (Tiškevičius) family residential manor in Tubeliai village, Šakiai District Municipality, Lithuania.

== History ==
According to the Sintautai parish records, the date of foundation of Zypliai village is estimated as 1697–1706. In the first half of the 19th century, Zypliai belonged to Duke Józef Poniatowski, the nephew of Stanisław II August the last King of Poland and Grand Duke of Lithuania, who took an active role in the French invasion of Russia and Emperor Napoleon Bonaparte made him a Marshal of the French Empire for his services. After Poniatowski's death, the assets in the lands of Suvalkija passed to his sister, Maria Teresa Poniatowska. All these assets – vast forests and 4 parish villages – were under the common name of the Zypliai Estate. Maria Teresa, who was living in Paris, sold the Zypliai estate to Jonas Bartkovskis, a landowner from Vitebsk Governorate.

The new owner, wanting to make as much profit as possible, founded a new manor near Lukšiai and called it New Zypliai. During his time, a brick-built, single-storey manor house, two oficinas, a kitchen with a bathhouse and wooden outbuildings and industrial buildings were built in a modest classical style. A parish school was established in 1864–1866, where the future patriarch of Lithuania, Dr. Jonas Basanavičius and sculptor Vincas Grybas studied. In 1855, after the death of Bartkovskis (buried in Lukšiai cemetery), the estate passed to his granddaughter Joana Volfersaite-Kučinskienė. Later, Zypliai passed to J. Kučinskienė's daughter Liudvika Ostrovskienė. She sold the manor to Count Tomasz Ludwik Potocki. The Count himself did not farm: he rented the Zypliai estate to a German businessman.

Around 1897, all the wooden outbuildings of the manor burnt down. The fire was caused by a steam engine brought to the manor by the German businessman. Shortly after the fire, the wooden buildings were replaced by red brick buildings. All the construction work was entrusted to the German tenant of the manor. The latter invited German builders. They not only supervised the construction, but also carried it out themselves, while the estate's servants and labourers were used only for auxiliary work. In 1889 Tomasz Potocki commissioned the extension and reconstruction of the manor house, which had been untouched since the Bartkovskis' period. During the reconstruction, two-storey extensions with attics were added at each end of the old manor house. The roof has been reworked to a mansard shape. The palace has acquired neo-Baroque elements.
