= Žagrė Society =

Agricultural cooperative in Lithuania

Žagrė Society (transl. sokha or ard; Lithuanian: Kooperatinė žemės ūkio draugija Žagrė) was a Lithuanian agricultural cooperative based in Marijampolė and active in Suvalkija (then part of the Congress Poland) from 1907 until the outbreak of World War I.

Žagrė was established by Catholic activists affiliated with the educational Žiburys Society which focused on opening Lithuanian primary schools. Žagrė established seven retail stores of agricultural supplies (fertilizer, machinery, tools), five grain cleaning stations, and ten rental shops of agricultural machinery. It also worked on improving agricultural knowledge and education. In 1910, the Marijampolė Farmers' Society and Žagrė organized a four-day agricultural exhibition in Marijampolė. Following its success, one-day exhibitions focusing on animal husbandry were organized in Vilkaviškis and Seirijai. Žagrė organized agricultural courses and conducted experiments to test equipment and fertilizers. It planned on opening an agricultural school at the Gižai Manor but the plans were interrupted by World War I. Several prominent businessmen in interwar Lithuania were involved with Žagrė, including Jonas Vailokaitis, Juozas Vailokaitis, and Jonas Lapėnas.

== Establishment ==
In the context of the Russian Revolution of 1905, the Tsarist authorities lifted some of the restrictions on Lithuanian activities (e.g. the Lithuanian press ban was lifted and Lithuanian schools were allowed). Therefore, in January 1906, Catholic activists established the educational Žiburys Society which organized Lithuanian primary schools. However, it quickly became apparent that educational and cultural work was not sufficient – Lithuanian peasants needed practical economic aid.

In the pages of the Catholic newspaper Šaltinis, Lithuanian priests discussed the example of Boerenbond in Belgium and urged creating a similar agricultural cooperative in Lithuania. They also copied the example of Kaunas Syndicate, established in 1892 by the nobles. Priests Justinas Staugaitis and Juozas Vailokaitis wanted to expand Žiburys to include economic and agricultural matters, while priest Tomas Žilinskas and activist Kazys Grinius wanted to establish a separate organization. During the general meeting of Žiburys on 21 October 1906, its members voted for a single society (123 votes for, 77 votes against).

However, the governor of Suwałki rejected the request to approve an agricultural section. Žiburys then decided to establish the separate Cooperative Agricultural Society Žagrė which was officially approved on 20 July 1907 and its founding meeting took place on 27 October 1907. The two societies remained close and continued to cooperate. Žagrė promised to donate 10% of its profits to Žiburys.

Grinius, a more liberal activists, protested Catholic influence and initiated the Marijampolė Farmers' Society (Marijampolės ūkininkų draugovė) which submitted its application to the governor of Suwałki on 27 October 1906 and held its founding meeting on 27 January 1907. The two societies competed, though Marijampolė Farmers' Society leaned more into educational work while Žagrė developed trade.

== Activities ==
=== Trade ===
Financial performance of Žagrė (in rubles)
| Year | Revenue | Assets | Capital | Gross profit |
|---|---|---|---|---|
| 1908 | 70,000 | 23,000 | 5,490 | 5,400 |
| 1909 | 125,000 | 41,000 | 7,324 | 9,100 |
| 1910 | 155,000 | 56,000 | 8,493 | 12,005 |
| 1911 | 189,850 | 73,300 | 11,243 | 12,929 |
| 1912 | 212,311 | 88,766 | 13,078 | 17,242 |
| 1913 | 301,892 | 165,818 | 17,600 | 21,155 |

The primary goal of Žagrė was to help peasants purchase tools, fertilizers, seed, etc. at lower prices while facilitating the sale of agricultural products at higher prices. It charged 3 rubles for membership and sold its shares for 10 rubles each. Each member had one vote regardless of how many shares they owned. Žagrė's membership increased from about 600 in 1910 to 1,094 in 1914. In 1912, Žagrė purchased a house in Marijampolė for its headquarters for 20,000 rubles.

Žagrė developed trade, though it was based in Marijampolė which was far from railway and not a major trading center. In March 1908, Žagrė opened its first store of agricultural supplies in Marijampolė by taking over an existing shop established by Lithuanian farmers in 1893. Similar stores were later opened in Vilkaviškis, Pivašiūnai, Šakiai, Klavarija, Seirijai, Kudirkos Naumiestis. In 1910, Žagrė's main revenue was from iron tools and coal (67%), fertilizers (19%), and machinery (13%). While Žagrė's revenue steadily grew, it sold many items on credit which tied up its cash flow and inhibited growth.

In 1912, Žagrė received a 1,500-ruble grant for grain cleaning stations (five such stations were established). It also established rental shops for agricultural machinery. In 1913, there were six such shops (Pilviškiai, Vilkaviškis, Marijampolė, Kalvarija, Seirijai, Paširvintis Manor). With a government grant of 1,200 rubles, Žagrė established four more rental shops in Gižai, Kučiūnai, Žemoji Panemunė, Griškabūdis.

Žagrė wanted to establish a society to provide fire insurance as well as build a grain elevator, but these plans were interrupted by World War I.

=== Agricultural exhibitions ===
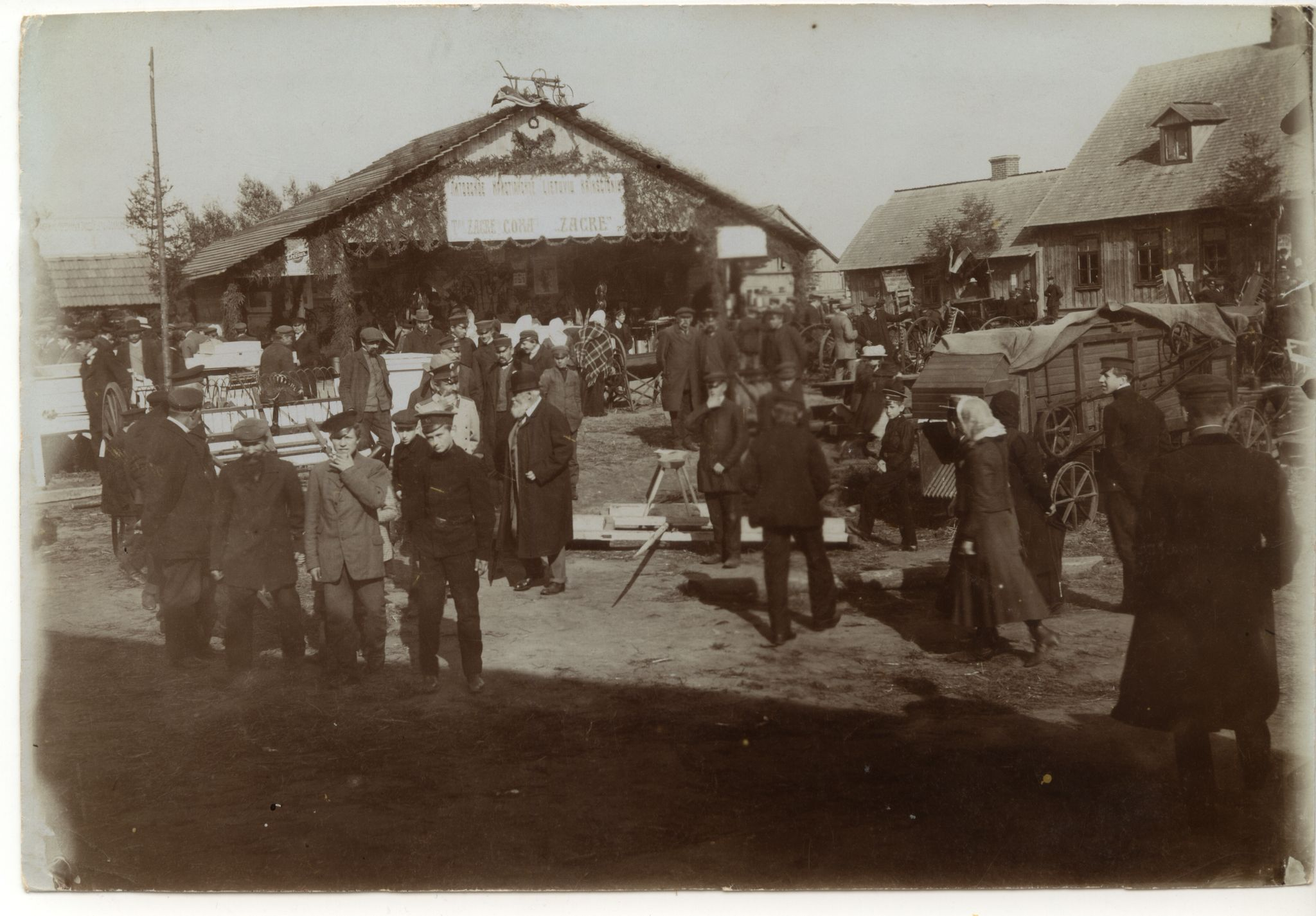
Žagrė booth at the 1911 exhibition

Žagrė and the Marijampolė Farmers' Society started organizing an agricultural exhibition in Marijampolė in 1908. Andrius Bulota, liberal member of the State Duma, was elected as chairman of the organizational committee. He obtained permits from the Suwałki Governorate. The government also gave a 750-ruble grant (total expenses were estimated at 4,000 rubles). The exhibition was initially scheduled in 1910, but due to a spreading livestock disease had to be moved to 28 September – 1 October 1911 (the Michaelmas).

It was one of the first exhibitions organized by peasants and not large landowners or the nobility. It exhibited produce, tools and machinery, several hundred horses (other farm animals were more difficult to transport), items of home industry. Žagrė's booth, in addition to agricultural supplies, showcased Lithuanian textiles, including items made by students of the Handcraft and Trade School for Women established by Petronėlė Uogintaitė. The best exhibits were awarded prizes up to 15 rubles and medals. The organizers spent almost 2,000 rubles on prizes.

The exhibition also showed where the farmers were lacking, including agricultural processing industry (particularly dairy) or more specialized fields like beekeeping or fisheries. The exhibit was accompanied by performances of a military orchestra, a choir from Jurbarkas, and theater plays. The exhibition was well attended – by the second day, about 10,000 tickets were sold.

The more liberal activists from the Marijampolė Farmers' Society took lead on organizing the exhibition, leading to squabbles with Catholic organizations. For example, Šaltinis was given a booth in a remote corner. Therefore, after the exhibition, Žagrė resolved to organize large multi-day exhibitions every five years and smaller one-day exhibitions every year. Such smaller exhibitions focusing on animal husbandry were organized in Vilkaviškis and Seirijai.

=== Education ===
In addition to trade, Žagrė aimed to improve agricultural knowledge and education. Thus, it was called a "cooperative agricultural society" and not simply a cooperative.

In 1912, Žagrė officially revised its statute to expand its territorial reach to Kovno and Vilna Governorates. It was also allowed to organize local chapters if at least ten members signed up as well as expand into agricultural education, organization of exhibitions, hiring of agronomists and instructors, etc. This move towards cultural cultural and educational work was motivated by government grants allotted to peasant educational circles (see: Stolypin reform). Žagrė hoped to receive such grants, particularly because priest Juozas Laukaitis was a member of the Fourth Duma and supported Žagrė. By 1914, Žagrė had 20 such educational circles.

Žagrė received several government grants. For example, in 1913, it received 3,500 rubles – 1,200 rubles for the agronomist, 600 rubles for the purchase of fertilizer, 300 rubles for agricultural lectures, 200 rubles for education on forage crops, etc.

Agricultural advice was published in Artojas (Ploughman), a supplement of Šaltinis, in 1911–1915. Žagrė organized courses for peasants. For example, in 1914, two-week courses were organized in Kučiūnai, Seirijai, Miroslavas. It also organized agricultural tests and experiments of ploughs in Gižai, forage crops in Kumelionys, and mineral fertilizers in about a hundred different fields. Agronomists from Žagrė visited individual farms to provide advice and education in the field. It also distributed seeds of better varieties of wheat, barley, and oats for free.

=== Gižai Agriculture School ===
Lithuanian priests raised the idea of an agricultural school as early as August 1905. The issue was taken up by Žiburys in January 1908. It modified the initial plan and decided to establish a model farm covering 100 desiatinas near Liudvinavas. However, the government delayed or rejected applications, mainly because of the language of instruction (the government insisted on Russian, while Žiburys wanted Lithuanian). Additionally, Žiburys lacked funds (it managed to collect 8,124 rubles by May 1912).

In August 1911, Žagrė elected a four-member committee (Jonas Krištolaitis, Vincas Totoraitis, Vincas Bielskus, Andrius Bulota) to work on establishing an agricultural school. In May 1912, Žagrė purchased Gižai Manor for 115,000 rubles. The manor buildings and about 300 morgens of land were slated for the planned school. The government approved the school in June 1913 and provided a one-time grant of 20,000 rubles and annual grant of 10,000 rubles for its needs. Žagrė also wanted to build a weather station in Gižai, but all of these plans were interrupted by the outbreak of World War I in July 1914.

== Personnel ==
Žagrė remained a Catholic organization under heavy influence of the clergy. For example, out of 20 representatives who attended a general meeting in 1914, 13 were Catholic priests. Disagreements between Catholics and more liberal members were frequently voiced during the lively meetings of Žagrė's members or in the Lithuanian press.

This first chairman of Žagrė was Jonas Gavėnas (later chairman of the Economic and Political Union of Lithuanian Farmers). Žagrė was later chaired by Vincas Bielskus, a former Lithuanian book smuggler. Other board members included Jonas Pranas Aleksa, the future Minister of Agriculture in interwar Lithuania.

Žagrė's meetings were frequently chaired by priest Juozas Vailokaitis while his younger brother Jonas Vailokaitis worked as a bookkeeper. In December 1919, together with Mykolas Krupavičius and Aleksandras Stulginskis, Vailokaitis brothers established the Farmers' Association which in its initial form was a clone of Žagrė.

Vincas Totoraitis (brother of Jonas Totoraitis) worked as Žagrė's instructor and agronomist for about five years. Žagrė's employees included Jonas Lapėnas who later became chairman of the cooperative union Lietūkis. Žagrė's meetings were attended by Petras Šalčius, then a gymnasium student who later became one of the most active cooperative activists in interwar Lithuania.

Vincas Mykolaitis-Putinas mentioned Žagrė in his novel Altorių šešėlyje (In Altars' Shadow).

== Interwar Lithuania ==
Žagrė was reestablished in interwar Lithuania but did not achieve pre-war success. Initially, it survived from the revenue from real estate purchased before the war. In 1929, it opened a colonial goods store and began operating as a cooperative and was able to repay pre-war debts by 1934. In early 1939, Žagrė opened a modern three-storey bakery which supplied bread to Lithuanian soldiers stationed in Marijampolė. Žagrė also opened three new stores – grocery, agricultural supplies, and personal items made of iron. Its further activities were interrupted by World War II.

== Bibliography ==
- Grigaravičius, Algirdas (2006). "Lietuvos žemdirbių sąjunga – ūkininkų interesų gynėja" (PDF). Kultūros barai (in Lithuanian). 7–8/9: 51–56, 78–84. ISSN 0134-3106.
- Jakubčionis, Algirdas (2020). "Nuo žagrės prie plūgo. Lietuvos žemės ūkis XIX ir XX a. sandūroje". Mano ūkis (in Lithuanian). 2.
- Katilius, Algimantas (2008). "Kunigo Justino Staugaičio visuomeninė veikla 1905-1915 metais". Lietuvių katalikų mokslo akademijos metraštis (in Lithuanian). 31: 11–37. ISSN 1392-0502.
- Katilius, Algimantas (2017). "Pastangos XX a. pradžioje Užnemunėje įsteigti žemės ūkio mokyklą". Terra Jatwezenorum (in Lithuanian). 9 (1): 208–218. ISSN 2080-7589.
- "Šiąnakt mirė Jonas Lapėnas". Lietuvos žinios (in Lithuanian). Vol. 165, no. 5434. 24 July 1937. pp. 1, 11.
- Lukoševičius, Vincentas (2004). "Marijampolės ūkio paroda". Pinigų studijos (in Lithuanian). 3: 62–72. ISSN 1648-8970.
- Lukoševičius, Vincentas (2005). "Kooperacijos judėjimas Lietuvoje iki Pirmojo pasaulinio karo". Pinigų studijos (in Lithuanian). 1: 43–60. ISSN 1648-8970.
- Mašalaitis, Benjaminas (23 November 2024). "Agronomas Jonas Totoraitis". mmm.lt (in Lithuanian).
- Šalčius, Petras (1937). "Žemės ūkio organizacijos Lietuvoje iki 1915 metų". Lietuvos universiteto Teisių fakulteto darbai (in Lithuanian). 9 (1).
- "Marijampolės "Žagrė"". Talka (in Lithuanian). Vol. 12, no. 427. 10 April 1940. p. 208.
- Pruskus, Valdas (2012). ""Žagrės" kūrimosi aplinkybės ir pirmasis veiklos dešimtmetis (1906–1915)". Mokslo ir technikos raida (in Lithuanian). 4 (2): 102–111. ISSN 2029-2449.
- "Žemės ūkio paroda Marijampolėje". Punskas.pl (in Lithuanian). 11 September 2023.
- Terleckas, Vladas (2013). "Jono Vailokaičio, signataro ir verslininko, veiklos bruožai". In Girininkienė, Vida; et al. (eds.). Sintautai (PDF). Lietuvos valsčiai (in Lithuanian). Vol. II. Versmė. pp. 2218–2258. ISBN 978-9955-589-75-4.
- Terleckas, Vladas (18 February 2024). "Daug nusipelnęs, labiausiai apšmeižtas signataras Jonas Vailokaitis". Voruta (in Lithuanian).
- Treinys, Mečislovas (9 September 2020) [2014]. ""Žagrė"". Visuotinė lietuvių enciklopedija (in Lithuanian). Mokslo ir enciklopedijų leidybos centras.
