= Juozas Vailokaitis =

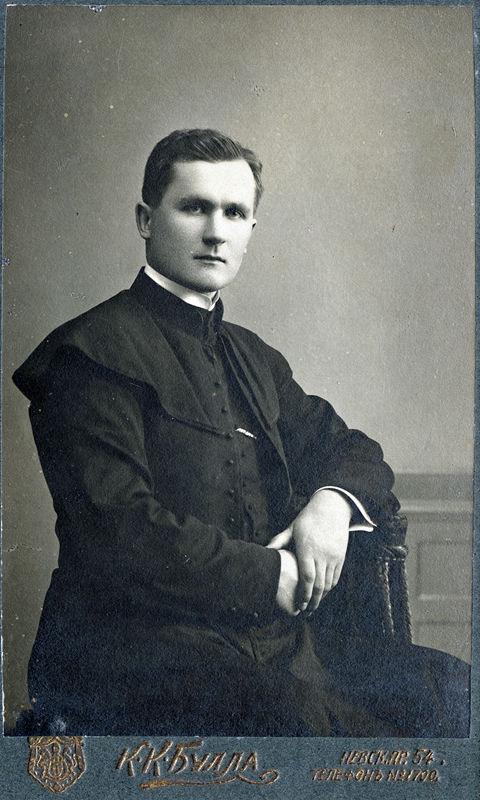
- Vailokaitis in 1917
- Born: 17 December 1880; Pikžirniai, Congress Poland
- Died: 2 August 1953 (aged 72); Paštuva, Lithuanian SSR
- Education: Sejny Priest Seminary; Saint Petersburg Roman Catholic Theological Academy
- Occupations: Catholic priest, member of the Seimas, newspaper editor, banker, industrialist
- Political party: Lithuanian Christian Democratic Party; Farmers' Association
- Relatives: Brothers Jonas Vailokaitis and Viktoras Vailokaitis

Juozas Vailokaitis (17 December 1880 – 2 August 1953) was a Lithuanian Roman Catholic priest, member of the Seimas, banker, and industrialist. He and his brother Jonas Vailokaitis (1886–1944) were widely regarded as the richest men in interwar Lithuania.

Educated at the Sejny Priest Seminary and the Saint Petersburg Roman Catholic Theological Academy, Vailokaitis was ordained priest in 1905. He was then assigned as editor-in-chief of the Lithuanian-language Catholic weekly newspaper Šaltinis which became the most popular Lithuanian periodical of the time (its circulation reached 15,000 copies). He was also active in Lithuanian cultural and economic life. Together with his brother Jonas, he was active in the agricultural cooperative Žagrė and cofounded the Company of Brothers Vailokaitis which provided loans to Lithuanians who wanted to buy land.

During World War I, he retreated to Russia where he organized the People's Union and published its weekly newspaper Vadas. He joined the Lithuanian Christian Democratic Party and became politically active. In 1919, he cofounded the Farmers' Association. Vailokaitis was elected to the Constituent Assembly of Lithuania in April 1920. He was chairman of the parliamentary committees on economy and frequently spoke during the parliamentary sessions on economic and financial matters. In May–July 1920, he participated in the negotiations in Moscow that led to the Soviet–Lithuanian Peace Treaty and was its signatory. Vailokaitis was reelected to the First and Second Seimas, but became less active and withdrew from politics in 1926.

Vailokaitis and his brother Jonas owned 98% of Ūkio bankas which became the largest commercial bank in interwar Lithuania. Using profits from the bank, Vailokaitis brothers established or bought several industrial enterprises, most successful of which were Palemonas (brickyard) and Metalas (metal factory), allowing them to accumulate substantial wealth. After the Soviet occupation of Lithuania in June 1940, Vailokaitis' businesses were nationalized and Vailokaitis was arrested and deported during the June deportation in 1941. He was allowed to return to Lithuania in 1944 as NKVD hoped to recruit him as an informant. However, he was reluctant cooperate and stopped providing information altogether around 1946. He was assigned as a dean to a small parish in Paštuva near Vilkija where he died in 1953.

== Biography ==
=== Early life and education ===
Juozas Vailokaitis was born on 17 December 1880 in Pikžirniai near Sintautai to a family of affluent Lithuanian farmers. Little is known about the family's origins. His contemporaries Mykolas Biržiška and Kazys Grinius claimed that he had some Jewish ancestry. His niece Aldona Vailokaitytė (vice-champion of the EuroBasket Women 1938) later claimed that the family's surname was derived from a nickname which in turn was derived from valenki (felt shoes). The family was successful and managed to expand their farm from 45 morgens (about 25 ha) to 130 morgens of land. Vailokaitis had three sisters and four brothers, including businessman Jonas Vailokaitis and teacher Viktoras Vailokaitis.

Vailokaitis attended Marijampolė Gymnasium before he enrolled at the Sejny Priest Seminary in 1897. There he joined Šaltinis, a secret society of Lithuanian clerics who supported the Lithuanian National Revival and read the banned Lithuanian publications. He became chairman of this society in 1900. After graduation, he continued his studies at the Saint Petersburg Roman Catholic Theological Academy. He graduated with a master's degree in theology and was ordained priest in 1905.

=== Russian Empire ===
Vailokaitis spent about a year as a vicar in Kalvarija before he was tasked with editing the Lithuanian-language Catholic weekly newspaper Šaltinis. He edited the newspaper from November 1906 to September 1910 and from February 1912 to fall 1915 though he frequently had use names of others as editors due to government censorship. He was able to cut the price of the newspaper while improving its visual appeal and publishing supplements. It became the most popular Lithuanian periodical of the time (its circulation reached 15,000 copies). While it was primarily Catholic newspaper, Šaltinis also published political texts. Vailokaitis wrote about 250 articles for the newspaper, most signed by various initials and pen names. Four times Vailokaitis faced fines and prison time for publishing articles criticizing the policies of the Russian government (unfair taxes on cooperatives, land sales by the government to immigrant Russians, brutality of Russian policemen). Besides fines, he was sentenced to three months in prison and four months in a monastery in Łomża.

While editing the newspaper, Vailokaitis was also active in cultural life. He organized various local Lithuanian events, choirs, evening courses for adults. In 1909, he joined the Lithuanian Scientific Society. He was also an active member of Žiburys Society which organized and maintained Lithuanian-language schools. Vailokaitis was also involved with Žagrė Society, an agricultural cooperative in Marijampolė, where his brother Jonas worked as a bookkeeper. Meetings of cooperative members were often chaired by Juozas while Jonas was secretary.

In 1912, brothers Jonas and Juozas moved to Kaunas and established the Company of Brothers Vailokaitis. The main purpose of this company was to provide loans to Lithuanians who wanted to buy land. It was an effort to resist Russification policies that called for land ownership by Russians. The company also accepted deposits and paid 4.5% to 5% interest, but it was not officially registered as a bank or a credit union. The company also purchased and sold land as well as acted as a broker. In 1913, the company's capital was 115,000 rubles.

=== World War I ===
During World War I, Vailokaitis retreated to Russia, first to Moscow and later to Saint Petersburg, where he was active in the Lithuanian refugee community. He established People's Union (Liaudies sąjunga). He worked with the union opening a printing press and publishing weekly Vadas, organizing evening courses for the illiterate, assisting Lithuanian refugees with getting proper identity documents and other paperwork. He established the Society of St. Paul for Lithuanian women who wanted to become nuns; they worked at the printing press. Several members of the society later joined the Sisters of the Immaculate Conception of the Blessed Virgin Mary.

He was also politically active. During the founding meeting of the Lithuanian Christian Democratic Party on 29 May – 3 June 1917, he was elected the party's chairman. He attended the Petrograd Seimas where he supported the full independence for Lithuania. He later was elected as treasurer of the short-lived Supreme Lithuanian Council in Russia.

At the end of 1918, Vailokaitis returned to Lithuania. At the outbreak of the Lithuanian–Soviet War, he did not evacuate from Vilnius to Kaunas. He attempted to revive the People's Union in Vilnius and organized a large concert to celebrate the one-year anniversary of the Act of Independence of Lithuania on 16 February 1919. The following day, he was arrested as a hostage by the Bolsheviks. He was held in Lukiškės Prison and later moved to Daugavpils and Smolensk. Together with 15 other prominent Lithuanian activists, he was exchanged for 30 communists in July 1919.

=== Independent Lithuania ===
==== Politics ====
In 1919, Vailokaitis together with his brother Jonas, Mykolas Krupavičius, and Aleksandras Stulginskis worked to established the Farmers' Association. The founding meeting took place on 28–29 December 1919. Vailokaitis was elected to the association's board.

As a representative of the Lithuanian Christian Democratic Party, Vailokaitis was elected to the Constituent Assembly of Lithuania in April 1920. He became a member of the parliamentary committees on economy (was its chairman), the Constitution of Lithuania, and the land reform. He actively participated in the parliamentary proceedings and spoke 127 times, most frequently on economic and financial issues (land reform, management of state land, taxes and custom duties, banking system, Lithuanian litas, limited liability companies) but also on other issues (Constitution of Lithuania, Vilnius conflict and relations with Poland, University of Lithuania). In particular, Vailokaitis was actively involved in organizing the Bank of Lithuania (opposing government's proposals to turn the bank into a regular bank outside of government's control) and introducing the Lithuanian litas. His opponents frequently accused him of delaying the introduction for personal gain.

In May–July 1920, he participated in the negotiations in Moscow that led to the Soviet–Lithuanian Peace Treaty and was its signatory. Vailokaitis was reelected to the First and Second Seimas as a representative of the Farmers' Association. In the First Seimas, he was a member of the parliamentary committee on economy and spoke nine times during the parliamentary proceedings. In the Second Seimas, he was a member of the parliamentary committee on budget and finances. He continued to speak on economic matters, but became less active and withdrew from politics in 1926.

==== Business ventures ====
Vailokaitis and his brother Jonas owned a bank and numerous industrial enterprises. They worked closely together, often sharing the top posts, but it is generally summarized that Juozas was more of a strategist while Jonas handled the execution. Brothers Vailokaitis amassed substantial wealth and were widely regarded as the richest men in interwar Lithuania. The name Vailokaitis became synonymous with a rich person.

On 16 February 1919, Jonas Vailokaitis together with Aleksandras Stulginskis, Andrius Dubinskas, and Pijus Grajauskas founded Ūkio bankas which became the largest commercial bank in interwar Lithuania. Juozas Vailokaitis did not participate in the founding as he was held by the Bolsheviks. However, brothers Vailokaitis consolidated their ownership stake and eventually owned 98% of the bank. Thus, it was informally known as the Vailokaitis Bank. Bank's capital was 15 million litas (1922). By 1938, its assets grew to 60.1 million litas. The bank primarily lent to industrial enterprises and not trading companies, even though trade was more profitable.

Using profits from the bank, Vailokaitis brothers established or bought several industrial enterprises, including Palemonas (brick), Metalas (metal), Maistas (food), Medis (lumber), Venta (lumber mill), Spėka (fish), Linas (flax), Eksimportas (import-export), Urmas (wholesale). The largest and most successful of these were Palemonas and Metalas. Palemonas, established in 1922 in a suburb of Kaunas near a railway and a peatbog (which provided fuel), was the largest producer of bricks and tiles in Lithuania. Around 1920–1922, the brothers purchased a metalworking factory from brothers Schmidt (originally established in 1879). The factory produced agricultural machines and tools, chains, wire, nails, buckets, and other metal goods. It employed about 400 people and with the capital of 7.5 million litas (1938) was the largest private enterprise in interwar Lithuania.

Other enterprises (except for Urmas) were usually short lived. For example, Maistas was established in 1923 with the goal of constructing a modern and refrigerated meat processing plant, and exporting eggs and meat abroad. However, it suffered substantial losses and was nationalized in 1925. Vailokaitis brothers also experimented with sugar beet production in Suvalkija in 1924. Reportedly they spent 50,000 litas to prove that sugar beet was a viable crop and that paved the way for the construction of the Marijampolė Sugar Factory in 1930s. In late 1930s, Vailokaitis brothers wanted to build cooperative apartment buildings in Kaunas to address housing shortages. A few such houses were built in Linksmadvaris.

Vailokaitis supported various charitable causes, mainly via Ūkio bankas: granting scholarships for about 200 students, providing funding for the Klaipėda Revolt, donating a 16-hectare (40-acre) plot of land to the newly established University of Lithuania. He also donated land for the construction of the Church of St. Casimir in Aleksotas.

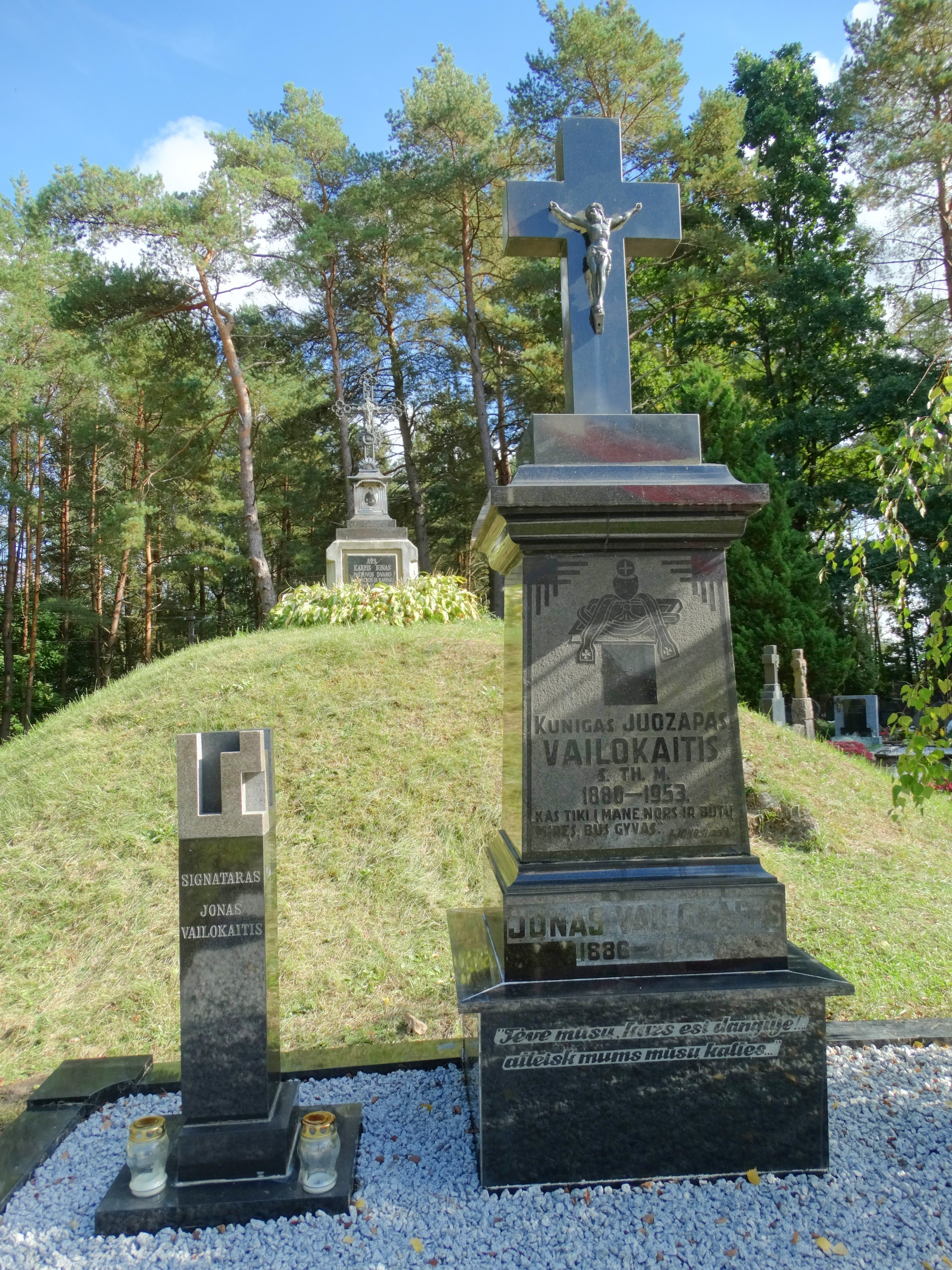
Grave of Vailokaitis in Paštuva

=== Soviet Lithuania ===
After the Soviet occupation of Lithuania in 1940, Vailokaitis' businesses were nationalized by the new communist government. His brother Jonas escaped to Germany, but Vailokaitis refused. Removed from his businesses and evicted from his home, Vailokaitis lived with his brother Viktoras Vailokaitis and found employment as a primary school teacher. He was arrested and deported during the June deportation in 1941 to the Krivosheinsky District in the Altai Krai. He provided religious services (baptisms, last rites, masses) to the deportees and was well respected by them.

In July 1944, Vailokaitis was allowed to return to Lithuania. Aleksandras Gudaitis-Guzevičius, chief of the NKVD in Lithuania, recruited Vailokaitis as an informant. However, he was reluctant cooperate and stopped providing information altogether around 1946. The Soviets started a new case against Vailokaitis but for some reason he was not prosecuted or deported. Instead, he was assigned as a dean to a small parish in Paštuva near Vilkija. There, he served the parishioners and lived a simple quiet life. His health was frail and he was frequently ill. He died on 2 August 1953 and was buried in the churchyard in Paštuva. An urn with the cremated remains of his brother Jonas was reburied next to him on 18 August 2007.

== Legacy ==
In 1985, Jonas Sakas-Sakevičius published biography of Vailokaitis in Rome. In independent Lithuania, Vailokaitis is usually commemorated with his brother Jonas. In 2017, two column shrines were built in Aleksotas in memory of the brothers. Another monument in their memory was erected in Kybartai in 2021.

== Bibliography ==
- Bukaitė, Vilma (2006). "Vailokaitis Juozas". In Ragauskas, Aivas; Tamošaitis, Mindaugas (eds.). Lietuvos Steigiamojo Seimo (1920–1922 metų) narių biografinis žodynas. Didysis Lietuvos parlamentarų biografinis žodynas (in Lithuanian). Vol. 2. Vilnius: Vilniaus pedagoginis universitetas. pp. 409–413. ISBN 9789955201465.
- Bukaitė, Vilma (2007). "Vailokaitis Juozas". In Ragauskas, Aivas; Tamošaitis, Mindaugas (eds.). Lietuvos Respublikos Seimų I (1922–1923), II (1923–1926), III (1926–1927), IV (1936–1940) narių biografinis žodynas. Didysis Lietuvos parlamentarų biografinis žodynas (in Lithuanian). Vol. 3. Vilniaus pedagoginis universitetas. pp. 544–545. ISBN 978-9955-20-345-2.
- Bukelevičiūtė, Dalia (15 December 2018). "Turtingiausi tarpukario Lietuvos žmonės" (in Lithuanian). Verslo žinos.
- Grigaravičius, Algirdas (2013). "Politinė lietuvių veikla Rusijoje 1917 metais". Darbai ir dienos (in Lithuanian). 60: 23–72. doi:10.7220/2335-8769.60.2. ISSN 1392-0588.
- Katilius, Algimantas (2016). Prelatas Kazimieras Steponas Šaulys. Iš Lietuvos nacionalinio muziejaus archyvo (in Lithuanian). Vilnius: Lietuvos nacionalinis muziejus. ISBN 978-609-8039-93-1.
- Krasauskas, Rapolas (March 1979). "Nekaltai Pradėtosios Švč. Mergelės Marijos seserų vienuolijos pradžia". Aidai (in Lithuanian).
- Lasinskas, Povilas (9 January 2019) [2011]. "Rusijos lietuvių seimas Petrograde". Visuotinė lietuvių enciklopedija (in Lithuanian). Mokslo ir enciklopedijų leidybos centras.
- Terleckas, Vladas (2001a). "Kunigas Juozas Vailokaitis: žmogui užtenka bulvės ir druskos". Sandora (in Lithuanian). 7–8. ISSN 1392-4621.
- Terleckas, Vladas (2001b). Lietuvos bankininkai: gyvenimų ir darbų pėdsakai (in Lithuanian). Vilnius: Lietuvos bankas. ISBN 9986651271.
- Terleckas, Vladas (2008). "Daug nusipelnęs, labiausiai apšmeižtas signataras Jonas Vailokaitis". Kultūros barai (in Lithuanian). 3: 79–88. ISSN 0134-3106.
- Terleckas, Vladas (2013). "Jono Vailokaičio, signataro ir verslininko, veiklos bruožai". In Girininkienė, Vida; et al. (eds.). Sintautai (PDF). Lietuvos valsčiai (in Lithuanian). Vol. II. Versmė. pp. 2218–2258. ISBN 978-9955-589-75-4.
- Vileišytė, Barbora (1968). "Kultūrinė Seinų spaustuvės veikla (1906–1915)" (PDF). Lietuvių katalikų mokslo akademijos metraštis (in Lithuanian). 4: 51–161. ISSN 1392-0502.
