= Jonas Vailokaitis =

Lithuanian banker and industrialist

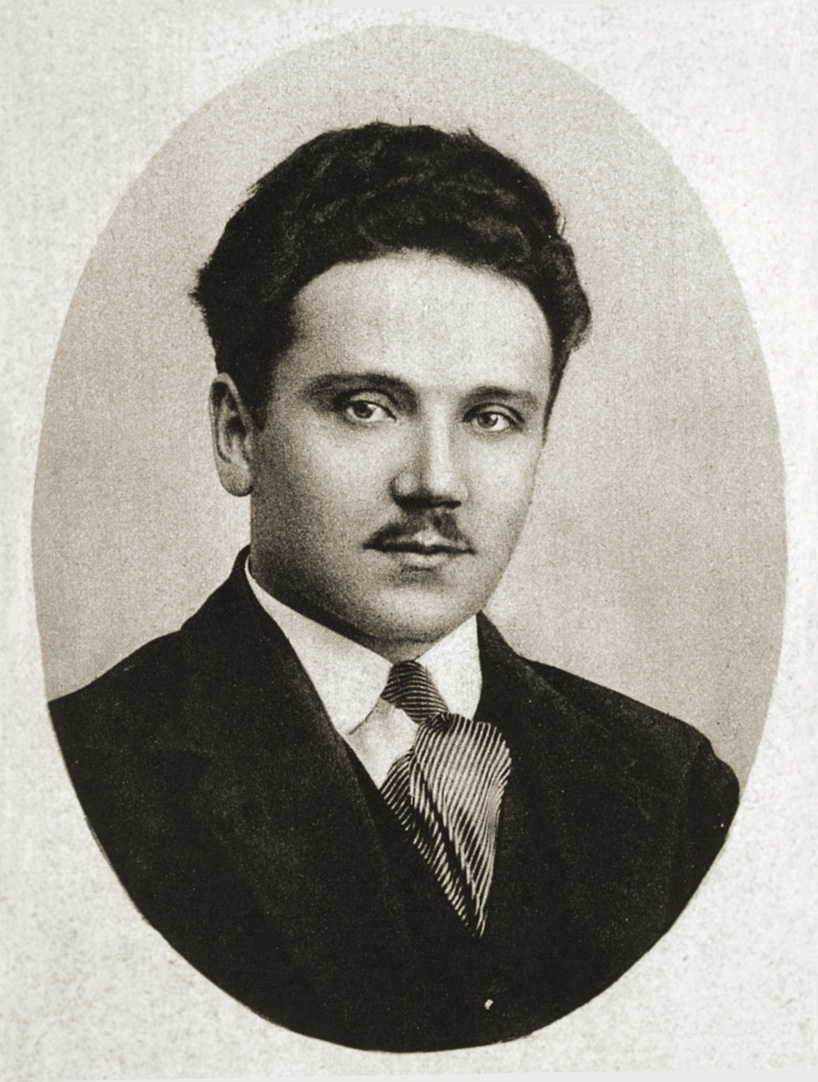
- Born: 25 June 1886; Pikžirniai, Congress Poland
- Died: 16 December 1944 (aged 58); Blankenburg, Saxony-Anhalt, Nazi Germany
- Occupations: Banker, businessman, politician
- Political party: Farmers' Association; Lithuanian Christian Democratic Party
- Spouse: Aleksandra Vailokaitienė
- Relatives: Brothers Juozas Vailokaitis and Viktoras Vailokaitis
- Awards: Order of the Lithuanian Grand Duke Gediminas (1938)

Jonas Vailokaitis (25 June 1886 – 16 December 1944) was a Lithuanian banker and industrialist. He and his brother Juozas Vailokaitis (1880–1953) were widely regarded as the richest men in interwar Lithuania. He was one of the twenty signatories of the Act of Independence of Lithuania.

Vailokaitis was educated at the Higher Commercial Courses in St. Petersburg. In 1912, brothers Jonas and Juozas moved to Kaunas and established the Company of Brothers Vailokaitis which provided loans to Lithuanians who wanted to buy land. During World War I, the company sold supplies and food to both the Russian Imperial Army and the Imperial German Army. At Vilnius Conference of 1917, Vailokaitis was elected to the Council of Lithuania which adopted the Act of Independence of Lithuania on 16 February 1918. In 1919, Vailokaitis co-founded the Farmers' Association on which ticket he was elected to the Constituent Assembly of Lithuania in April 1920. In the assembly, he served as chairman of the budget and finance commissions. He resigned from the Constituent Assembly in March 1922, but continued to be influential in the ruling Lithuanian Christian Democratic Party.

Together with his brother, Vailokaitis established Ūkio bankas which became the largest commercial bank in interwar Lithuania. Using profits from the bank, Vailokaitis brothers established or bought several industrial enterprises, most successful of which were Palemonas (brickyard) and Metalas (metal factory). Vailokaitis was shareholder and vice-chairman of the Bank of Lithuania. His wealth attracted substantial criticism from political opponents, particularly from the Lithuanian Communist Party. He was accused of conflict of interest, currency speculation, avoidance of taxes, etc. Vailokaitis supported various charitable causes, including financial backing for the Klaipėda Revolt, land donation to the newly established University of Lithuania, and scholarships to about 200 Lithuanian students. After the Soviet occupation of Lithuania in June 1940, he moved to Nazi Germany, where he died in 1944.

== Biography ==
=== Early life and education ===
Jonas Vailokaitis was born on 25 June 1886 in Pikžirniai near Sintautai to a family of affluent Lithuanian farmers. Little is known about the family's origins. His contemporaries Mykolas Biržiška and Kazys Grinius claimed that he had some Jewish ancestry. His niece Aldona Vailokaitytė (vice-champion of the EuroBasket Women 1938) later claimed that the family's surname was derived from a nickname which in turn was derived from valenki (felt shoes). The family was successful and managed to expand their farm from 45 morgens (about 25 ha) to 130 morgens of land. Vailokaitis had three sisters and four brothers, including priest Juozas Vailokaitis and teacher Viktoras Vailokaitis.

Little is known about Vailokaitis' education. It is believed he attended Marijampolė Gymnasium. In 1908, he graduated from the Higher Commercial Courses (later renamed Trade and Industrial Institute) in St. Petersburg. It was a rather unusual choice for a Lithuanian as most Lithuanian students chose to become priests, doctors, or attorneys.

=== Early business career ===
In 1910, Vailokaitis started working as a bookkeeper at Žagrė Society, an agricultural cooperative in Marijampolė. Established by Catholic priests and more educated farmers, it helped farmers to acquire cheaper fertilizers, seed, agricultural equipment as well as to sell their products at higher prices. It also educated farmers and planned to open an agricultural school in Gižai Manor. Meetings of cooperative members were often chaired by Vailokaitis' brother Juozas while Jonas was secretary. Vailokaitis was also involved in cultural life in Marijampolė. He was a member of an amateur theater troupe organized by Albinas Iešmanta. It staged the first public performance in June 1909.

In 1912, brothers Jonas and Juozas moved to Kaunas and established the Company of Brothers Vailokaitis. The main purpose of this company was to provide loans to Lithuanians who wanted to buy land. It was an effort to resist Russification policies that called for land ownership by Russians. The company also accepted deposits and paid 4.5% to 5% interest, but it was not officially registered as a bank or a credit union. The company also purchased and sold land as well as acted as a broker. In 1913, the company's capital was 115,000 rubles.

At the outbreak of World War I in August 1914, the company relocated to Vilnius and started selling supplies to the Russian Imperial Army. Juozas retreated to the interior of the Russian Empire thus the company was run by Jonas Vailokaitis. When Vilnius was occupied by the Germans in 1915, the company sold grain to the Imperial German Army. The company was active until about summer 1920 when it merged into Ūkio bankas.

=== Council of Lithuania ===
During World War I, Vailokatis kept a diary in which he registered German excesses against the Lithuanians. The Germans discovered this diary and briefly imprisoned Vailokaitis. He also became involved with the Lithuanian Society for the Relief of War Sufferers and helped it procure food items.

In September 1917, Vailokaitis attended Vilnius Conference which discussed Lithuania's political aspirations after the war. He was elected to the 20-member Council of Lithuania. At the age of 31, he was the third youngest member of the council. Residing in Vilnius, Vailokaitis attended council's meetings and participated in various commissions. He was more vocal on economic matters. For example, he suggested that the Council of Lithuania take out a loan of 10 million rubles, protested German military requisitions, and opposed making commitments to Germany regarding custom duties in the Act of 11 December. When four members of the council (Mykolas Biržiška, Steponas Kairys, Stanisław Narutowicz, and Jonas Vileišis) resigned from the council in protest of the Act of 11 December, Vailokaitis was among the members who worked to bring them back. After intense negotiations, the four members returned and the council adopted the Act of Independence on 16 February 1918.

When the Council of Lithuania voted to establish monarchy in Lithuania in July 1918, Vailokaitis abstained. He supported monarchy in principle, but thought that the times were too uncertain to make such choices. After July, Vailokaitis did not attend council's sessions until November 1918. After that, he attended the meetings irregularly. In early 1919, he evacuated to Kaunas. Vailokaitis continued to participate in the meetings of the Council of Lithuania, mostly on matters concerning finance, currency, and other economic matters. On 23 July 1919, Vailokaitis supervised a prisoner exchange with the Soviet Russia. His brother Juozas was among the 16 freed Lithuanians.

=== Constituent Assembly ===
In 1919, Vailokaitis together with his brother Juozas, Mykolas Krupavičius, and Aleksandras Stulginskis worked to established the Farmers' Association. Initially, it was a clone of the pre-war Žagrė Society: it sought to improve farmer's economic conditions by providing agricultural equipment and fertilizer. The founding meeting took place on 28–29 December 1919. Juozas was elected to the association's board while Jonas to the revision commission.

As a candidate of the Farmer's Association, Vailokaitis was elected to the Constituent Assembly of Lithuania in April 1920. The association formed a coalition with the Lithuanian Christian Democratic Party and the Lithuanian Labour Federation and gained majority in the assembly. Vailokaitis became one of the leaders of the coalition (he was elected to its presidium). He was also selected as the chairman of the key Budged and Finance Committee. He supported the establishment of the Bank of Lithuania, issuance of Lithuanian litas, austerity measures to deal with budget deficits, tax reform (reducing reliance on indirect taxes), and the land reform which would nationalize nobility's landholdings and distribute them to small farmers.

Vailokaitis resigned from the Constituent Assembly on 3 March 1922 and did not return to politics.

=== Business ventures ===
On 16 February 1919, Vailokaitis together with Aleksandras Stulginskis, Andrius Dubinskas, and Pijus Grajauskas founded Ūkio bankas which became the largest commercial bank in interwar Lithuania. Brothers Vailokaitis consolidated their ownership stake and eventually owned 98% of the bank. Thus, it was informally known as the Vailokaitis Bank. According to bank employee Jonas Sakas-Sakevičius, the bank was able to trade U.S. dollars and German marks in the Berlin exchange and make a profit of 15 million litas. Bank's capital was 15 million litas (1922). By 1938, its assets grew to 60.1 million litas. The bank primarily lent to industrial enterprises and not trading companies, even though trade was more profitable.

Using profits from the bank, Vailokaitis brothers established or bought several industrial enterprises, including Palemonas (brick), Metalas (metal), Maistas (food), Medis (lumber), Venta (lumber mill), Spėka (fish), Linas (flax), Eksimportas (import-export), Urmas (wholesale). The largest and most successful of these were Palemonas and Metalas. Palemonas, established in 1922 in a suburb of Kaunas near a railway and a peatbog (which provided fuel), was the largest producer of bricks and tiles in Lithuania. Around 1920–1922, the brothers purchased a metalworking factory from brothers Schmidt (originally established in 1879). The factory produced agricultural machines and tools, chains, wire, nails, buckets, and other metal goods. It employed about 400 people and with the capital of 7.5 million litas (1938) was the largest private enterprise in interwar Lithuania. For a time, the factory employed Vytautas Andrius Graičiūnas as its technical director. Graičiūnas offered Vailokaitis to open a Ford factory in Lithuania, but the idea was rejected.

Other enterprises (except for Urmas) were usually short lived. For example, Maistas was established in 1923 with the goal of constructing a modern and refrigerated meat processing plant, and exporting eggs and meat abroad. However, it suffered substantial losses and was nationalized in 1925. Vailokaitis brothers also experimented with sugar beet production in Suvalkija in 1924. Reportedly they spent 50,000 litas to prove that sugar beet was a viable crop and that paved the way for the construction of the Marijampolė Sugar Factory in 1930s. In late 1930s, Vailokaitis brothers wanted to build cooperative apartment buildings in Kaunas to address housing shortages. A few such houses were built in Linksmadvaris.

=== Support of Lithuanian policies ===
Vailokaitis brothers and their Ūkio bankas supported policies of the Lithuanian government. In 1920 or 1921, the bank loaned the government money so that Lithuania did not have to sell its gold reserves. This loan was fiercely criticized by the political opposition, including Augustinas Voldemaras, but a special revision commission found no improprieties. Ūkio bankas is also credited for helping stabilize Lithuanian litas when it was launched in October 1922. The bank exchanged litas to Russian rubles and German marks at the official exchange rates set by the Bank of Lithuania thus calming the speculative market. His critics and opponents accused him of profiting from such trade: Lithuanian workers were paid in litas but did not trust this new currency and hurried to exchange it to German Papiermarks that soon became worthless due to the hyperinflation. Thus the bank got rid of worthless marks and acquired litas that proved to be stable.

The Bank of Lithuania was organized as a joint stock company, and Vailokaitis brothers and their enterprises purchased stock worth US$28,000 (equivalent to $538,600 in 2025). They opposed proposals by Prime Minister Ernestas Galvanauskas to turn the Bank of Lithuania into a regular bank where the government would have no control or influence. Jonas Vailokaitis was bank's vice-chairman in 1922–1926 and 1928–1929.

Vailokaitis provided financial backing to the Klaipėda Revolt in January 1923: he donated US$12,500 (equivalent to $236,200 in 2025) for the cause and pledged another $10,000 if needed. Vailokaitis also supported the newly established University of Lithuania by donating a 16-hectare (40-acre) plot of land for the construction of the Physics and Chemistry Institute in 1925. Vailokaitis also donated to other charitable causes, including providing scholarships to about 200 Lithuanian students via Ūkio bankas. In April 1927, Vailokaitis became one of the founders of the Aeroclub of Lithuania.

Vailokaitis was a member of the Lithuanian Chamber of Commerce and Industry from its establishment in 1925 to liquidation in 1940. At first, he worked in the section dealing with Lithuanian trade with England and Germany (largest export partners of Lithuania). He later worked in the commissions on communications (was its chairman in 1929), taxes, banks and was chairman of a committee that promoted the industrial development in Lithuania. The committee had to explain that industry and not agriculture was the future. It organized lectures, published brochures, and lobbied for including a class on economy and industry in schools. In 1933, Vailokaitis attended the 2nd Economic Conference of Lithuanian Americans in Chicago where he delivered a presentation of the Lithuanian Chamber of Commerce and Industry.

=== Shadow diplomat ===
According to a report by British consul G. W. Berry, Vailokaitis continued to have great influence among the Lithuanian Christian Democratic Party. According to Berry, Prime Minister Vytautas Petrulis owed his position to Vailokaitis' influence. Further, Vailokaitis was interested in normalizing relationship with the Second Polish Republic. Petrulis attempted to negotiate with Poland regarding the timber export via the Neman River as the conflict hurt timber industry in the Klaipėda Region. However, intense internal opposition led to the collapse of the negotiations and resignation of Petrulis in September 1925.

Vailokaitis participated in the trade negotiations with the Soviet Union that followed after the Soviet–Lithuanian Non-Aggression Pact was signed in September 1926. According to a diary of the Soviet envoy Sergey Aleksandrovsky, to win Vailokaitis' support, the Soviet Union placed a 700,000 ruble order from his Metalas factory. In turn, Vailokaitis promised to exert his influence on the Farmers' Association so that its members voted for the ratification of the Non-Aggression Pact in the Third Seimas. However, banking historian Vladas Terleckas questioned the accuracy of such deal as statistics on the Lithuanian exports to the Soviet Union show much smaller quantities of metal good exports than the alleged 700,000 ruble order.

As a result of the Great Depression and the British Empire Economic Conference, Great Britain enacted protectionist policies that limited imports. Nevertheless, Lithuania was able to conclude a trade agreement in July 1934. In December 1934, Vailokaitis was sent to London to discuss complaints about quantity and quality of traded goods.

=== Death and legacy ===
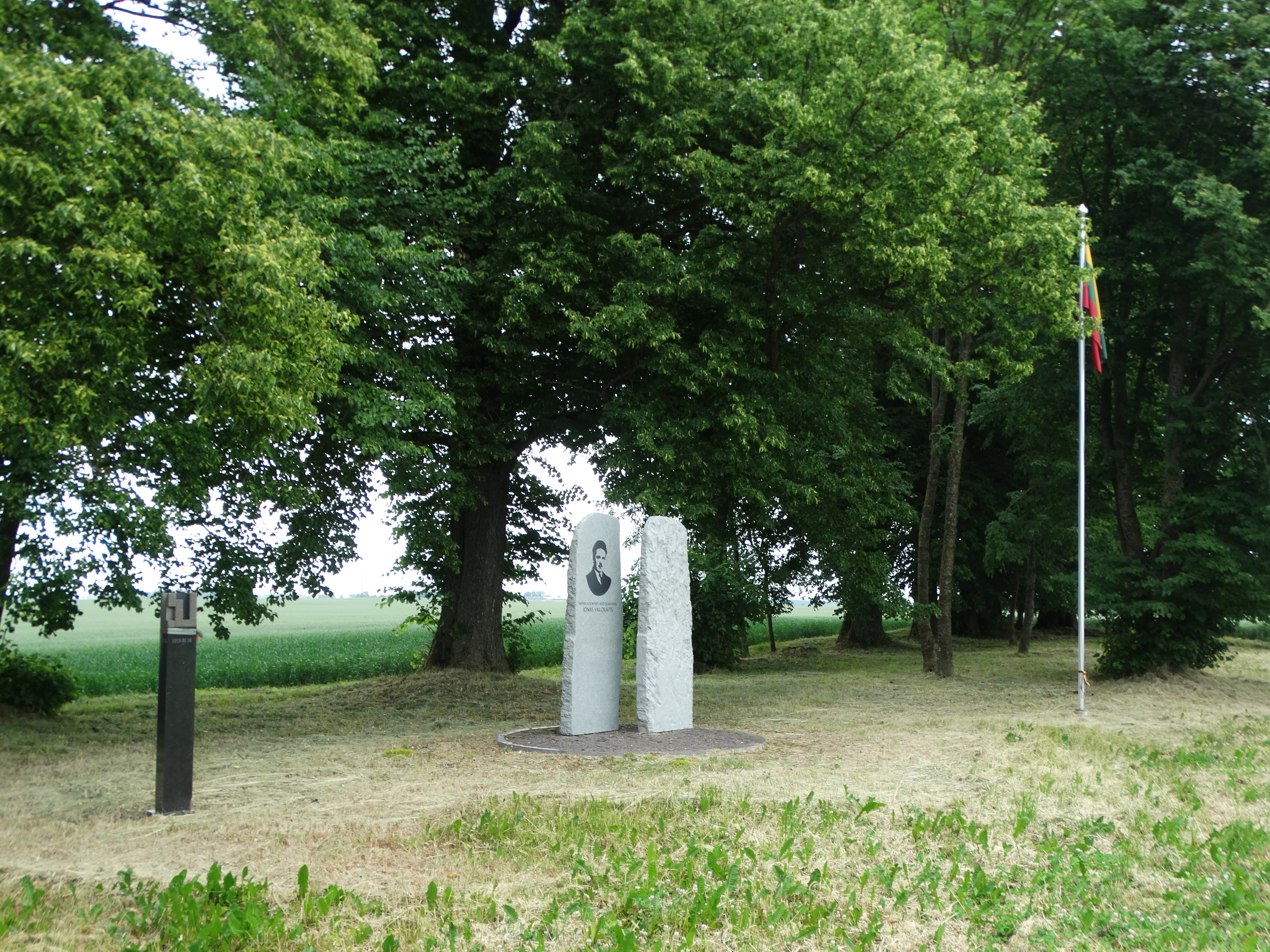
Memorial stone to Vailokaitis at his birthplace

After the Soviet occupation of Lithuania in 1940, Vailokaitis and his family escaped to Nazi Germany. They first lived in Berlin, then in Blankenburg in Saxony-Anhalt. Vailokaitis continued to be active in the Lithuanian community. He assisted with the establishment of the Lithuanian Activist Front and organized aid to Lithuanian refugees. He was able to briefly visit German-occupied Lithuania in April 1942. Vailokaitis died in Blankenburg on 16 December 1944. An urn with his cremated remains was reburied next to his brother Juozas in the cemetery of Paštuva village on 18 August 2007.

Brothers Vailokaitis were widely regarded as the richest men in interwar Lithuania. The name Vailokaitis became synonymous with a rich person. As such, he was subject to various rumors and accusations. Vailokaitis was accused of currency speculation, taking cheap loans from the Bank of Lithuania and then reloaning the money at much inflated interest to others, avoidance of taxes, using government funds to prop up his failing business ventures, etc. He was particularly slandered by the Lithuanian Communist Party. Its proclamations painted Vailokaitis as a corrupt leech stealing Lithuania's riches and as a foreign agent of France, Poland, or United States. Teofilis Tilvytis wrote a satirical poem Letter to Vailokaitis in which he expressed joy for the end of the bourgeois and start of the communist regimes. The poem was included in Lithuanian school curriculum until the Khrushchev Thaw in 1956.

Vailokaitis was not immediately commemorated after Lithuania regained independence in 1990. The first monograph about his life was published by Vladas Terleckas in 2011. In 2015, a small street in Rokai (neighborhood of Kaunas) was named after him. Two other small streets in Vilnius and Šakiai also bear his name. In 2017, the Lithuanian National Radio and Television created a 45-minute documentary about his life. The same year, two column shrines were built in Aleksotas in memory of brothers Vailokaitis. A stone monument was unveiled at their birthplace in June 2018. Another monument in their memory was erected in Kybartai in 2021.

== Personal life ==
On 25 January 1919, Vailokaitis married photographer Aleksandra Jurašaitytė (1895–1957) from Vilnius. After the wedding, the couple moved to Kaunas and Vailokaitienė left her photography career behind. They had four children (three daughters and a son). After the Soviet occupation of Lithuania in June 1940, the entire family escaped to Nazi Germany. By 1947, Vailokaitienė and the four children moved to the United States.

== Vailokaitis houses ==
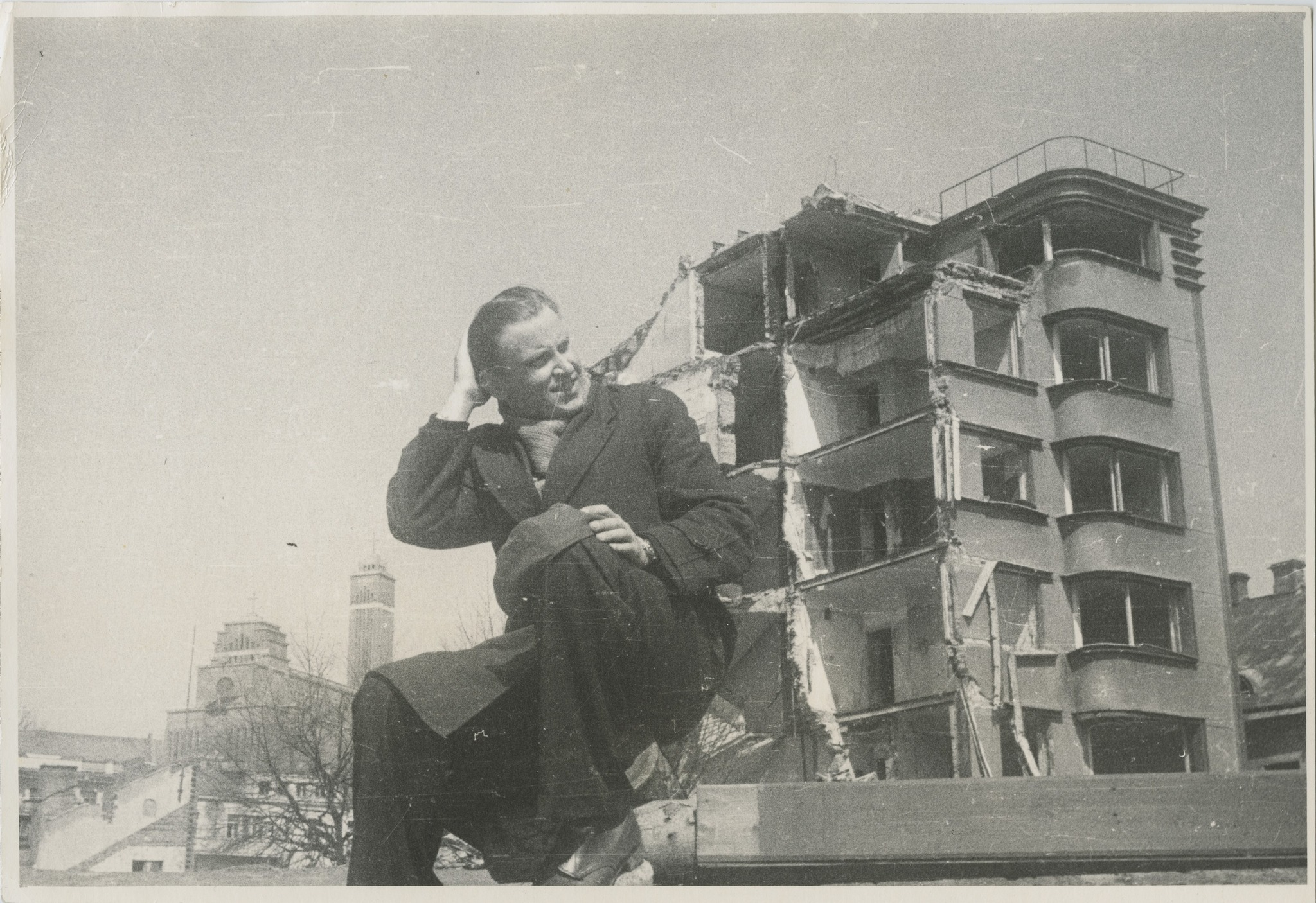
Partially demolished Vailokaitis house in Kaunas in 1944

Around 1930, Vailokaitis family built a luxurious six-floor house by architect Arno Funk in Kaunas. The house had multiple apartments which were rented out to others. The house was nationalized by the Soviets in 1940 and transferred to the Lithuanian Writers' Union. During the German occupation, the house was taken over by Theodor Adrian von Renteln, General Commissioner of Generalbezirk Litauen. The house was bombed in 1944 and later fully demolished.

Vailokaitis also owned a summer house in Palanga. Built in 1898, Villa Anapilis was purchased from the Tyszkiewicz family. It was visited by many prominent Lithuanians, including poet Maironis, writer Vincas Mykolaitis-Putinas, singer Kipras Petrauskas, President Aleksandras Stulginskis. The villa now houses the Palanga Resort Museum.

In 1939, Vailokaitis purchased Paežeriai Manor originally built by Szymon Zabiełło in 1790s. Vailokaitis started manor's modernization (built central heating system).

== Bibliography ==
- Bukelevičiūtė, Dalia (15 December 2018). "Turtingiausi tarpukario Lietuvos žmonės" (in Lithuanian). Verslo žinos.
- Kažukauskas, Vytautas (January 2003). "Visa Lietuvių tauta atsiėmė Klaipėdą". Vytautai (in Lithuanian). 1. Archived from the original on 2011-09-28.
- Lapas, Raimundas Marius (16 February 2013). "Už kiekvieno didžio vyro – didi moteris!" (PDF). Draugas (in Lithuanian). CIV (20): 7–8.
- Mikalčiūtė-Urbonė, Raimonda (2018). "Jonas Vailokaitis" (in Lithuanian). 15min.lt.
- Pruskus, Valdas (2013). "Tarpukario Lietuvos milijonieriai: praturtėjimo būdai ir jų ypatumai nūdienos realijų kontekste". Mokslo ir technikos raida (in Lithuanian). 5 (1): 34–41. ISSN 2029-2430.
- Terleckas, Vladas (2001). Lietuvos bankininkai: gyvenimų ir darbų pėdsakai (in Lithuanian). Vilnius: Lietuvos bankas. ISBN 9986651271.
- Terleckas, Vladas (2008). "Daug nusipelnęs, labiausiai apšmeižtas signataras Jonas Vailokaitis". Kultūros barai (in Lithuanian). 3: 79–88. ISSN 0134-3106.
- Terleckas, Vladas (12 March 2011). "Ar sovietai pirko iš Vailokaičių metalo gaminius?". Voruta (in Lithuanian). 5 (719): 4.
- Terleckas, Vladas (2013). "Jono Vailokaičio, signataro ir verslininko, veiklos bruožai". In Girininkienė, Vida; et al. (eds.). Sintautai (PDF). Lietuvos valsčiai (in Lithuanian). Vol. II. Versmė. pp. 2218–2258. ISBN 978-9955-589-75-4.
- Vilkelytė, Daiva (2021). "Žmogus spėjęs tik į vieną traukinį: Teofilis Tilvytis". Žmonės. Legendos. (in Lithuanian). 2: 69–76. ISSN 2029-3216.
- Žalys, Vytautas (2007). Lietuvos diplomatijos istorija (1925–1940) (in Lithuanian). Vol. I. Vilnius: Versus aureus. ISBN 978-9955-699-50-7.
