= Sokha =

Horse-drawn plow

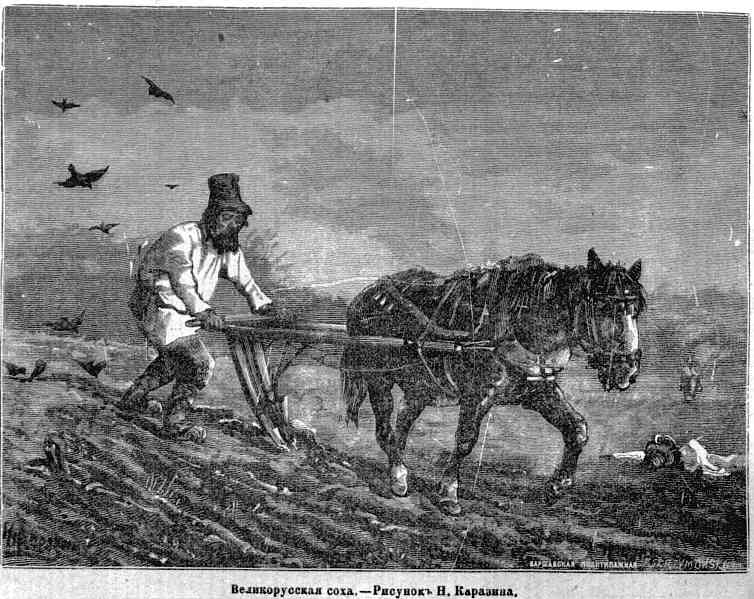
Great Russian sokha, illustration by Nikolay Karazin, 1899

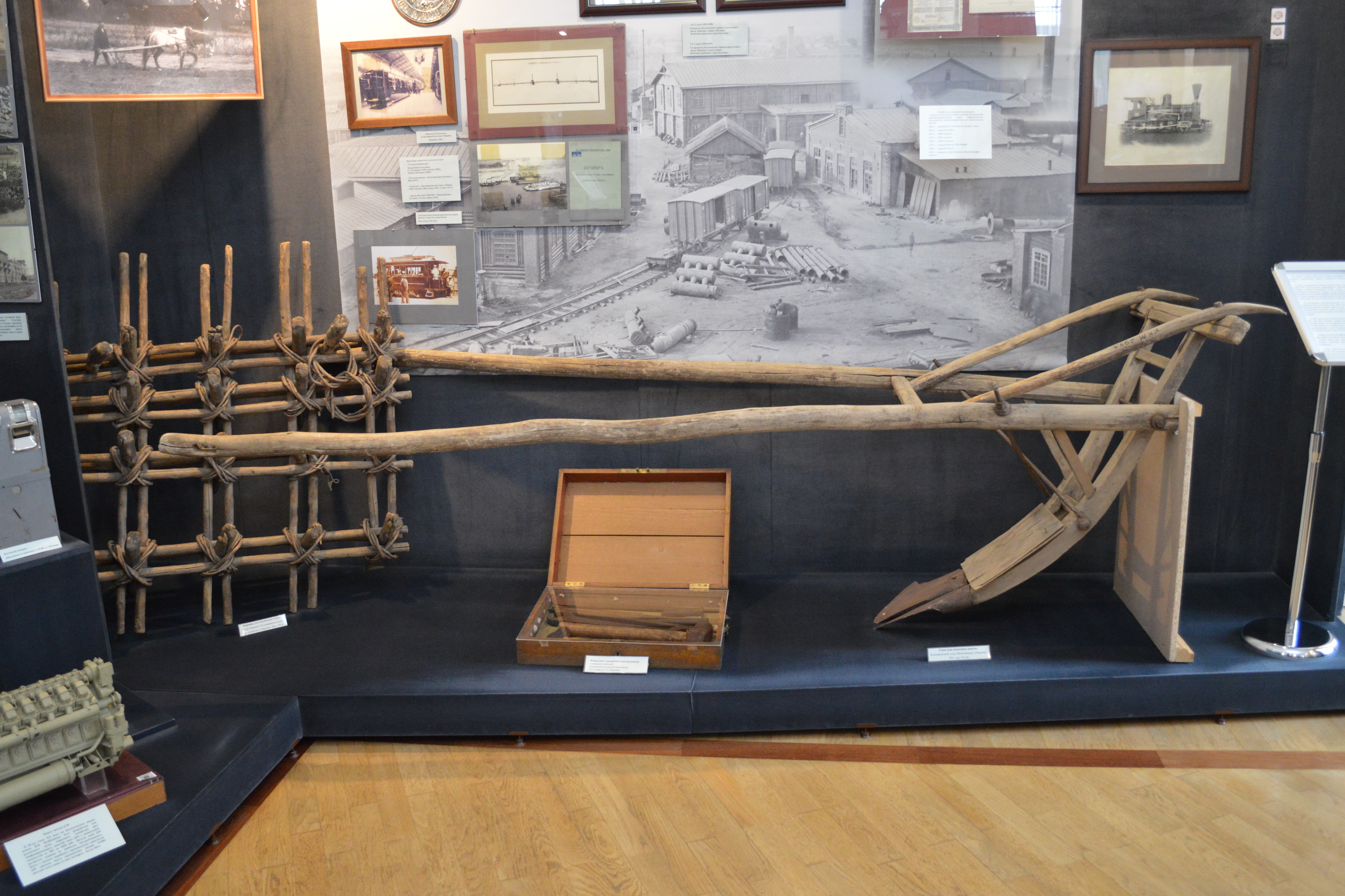
Sokha dating to the 19th to mid-20th century

A sokha (Church Slavonic: соха) is a light wooden ard, consisting of two body ards, with their parallel beams forming the two shafts for a single horse-drawn tillage implement with two socket shares (рассоха). In later types, the double body is combined into one wooden board.

The sokha adapts the body ard to a single-animal harness following the pattern of a shaft-drawn cart and adds a spade-like component that turned over the soil. On ploughs, the curved mouldboard both cuts and turns the soil. Other design features can vary depending on local building custom.

It was used primarily in Russia, Finland, and other countries in Northern and Eastern Europe.

== History ==
The origin of the sokha is uncertain, as well as its spread across the East European Plain. The current evidence suggests that it originated in the forest zone of European Russia. The sokha is mentioned as a tool or tax unit in 1275 and two birch bark manuscripts found in Novgorod also reference the sokha around this time. In Russia, the sokha was also used as a unit of taxation and the size of the sokha varied greatly by region and over time as this depended on the quality of the land to be ploughed.

By the 14th century, the sokha had spread to other regions, and its distribution is generally agreed to cover eastern Poland, northwestern Ukraine, Belarus, European Russia, Finland, and the Baltic states, as well as a small part of Siberia and Sweden. It likely spread first into the northern areas of the forest zone in European Russia and then Karelia, and then across the Gulf of Finland.

== See also ==
- Timeline of Russian inventions and technology records

== Bibliography ==
- Feldbrugge, Ferdinand J. M. (2 October 2017). A History of Russian Law: From Ancient Times to the Council Code (Ulozhenie) of Tsar Aleksei Mikhailovich of 1649. BRILL. ISBN 978-90-04-35214-8.
- Smith, Robert E. F. (1977). Peasant Farming in Muscovy. CUP Archive. ISBN 978-0-521-20912-0.
- George Vernadsky. A History of Russia. (Yale University Press, 1969) (ISBN 0-300-00247-5).
