= Lukšiai Eldership =

Eldership of Lithuania

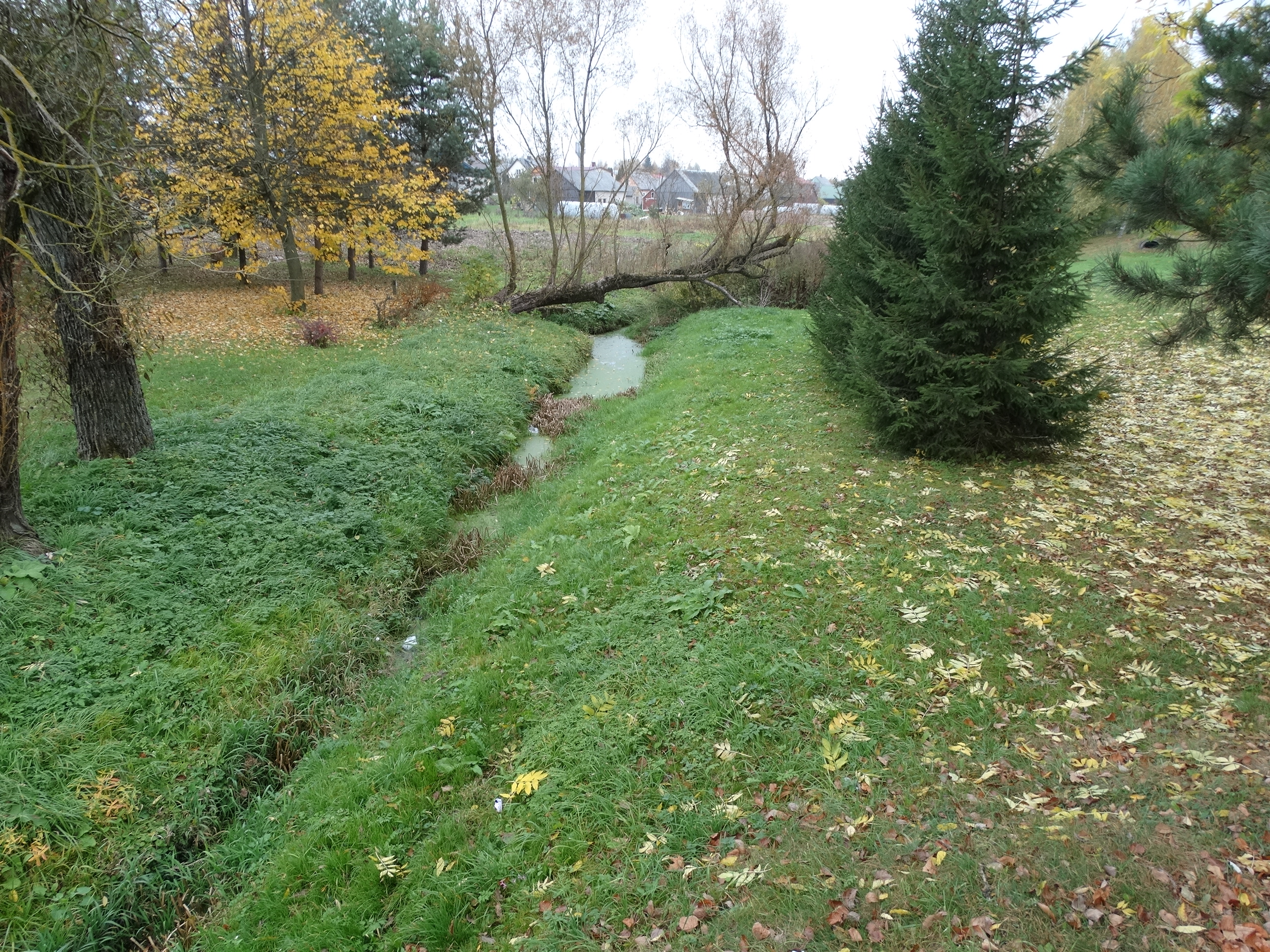
River Lenkupys in Lukšiai, Šakiai district, Lithuania

The Lukšiai Eldership (Lithuanian: Lukšių seniūnija) is an eldership of Lithuania, located in the Šakiai District Municipality. In 2021 its population was 2076.
