= Paežeriai Manor (Vilkaviškis) =

Manor and museum in Lithuania

- Paežerių dvaras (Lithuanian)
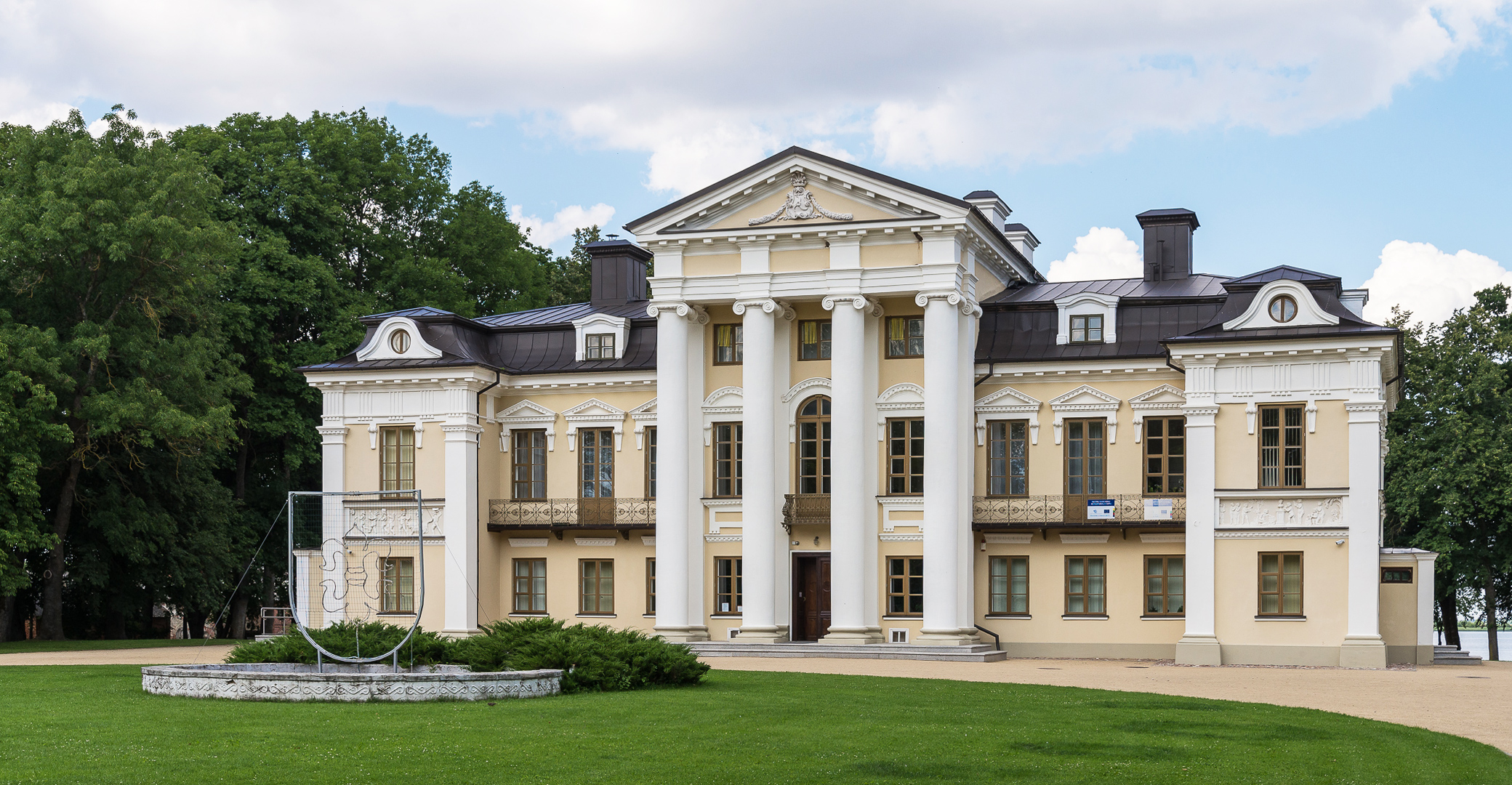
- Paežeriai Manor in 2020

- Location within Lithuania
- Interactive map of Paežeriai Manor
- 54.6395°N 22.9790°E
- Type: Residential manor
- Location: Paežeriai, Lithuania

History
- Built: 1795–1799
- Built for: Szymon Zabiełło

Site notes
- Architect: Marcin Knackfus
- Architectural style: Classical Revival
- Owner: Sudovia Regional Cultural Centre-Museum
- Website: paezeriai.info

Cultural Monuments of Lithuania
- Type: National
- Designated: 13 February 2008
- Reference no.: 1029

Paežeriai Manor (Lithuanian: Paežerių dvaras) is a former residential manor in Paežeriai village, Vilkaviškis District Municipality, Lithuania. Currently it is occupied by Suvalkija (Sūduva) Cultural Center of Vilkaviškis District.

== Architecture ==
The architect of the Paežeriai Manor House, which was built in 1795–1799, was Marcin Knackfus, a pioneer of classicist architecture in Grand Duchy of Lithuania. The Romanesque style manor administration building and Gothic Revival Belvederis Tower (17 m high) were built in the first half of the 19th century. To the southwest of the manor administration building are red brick, stone, and brick outbuildings – a stable, a distillery and warehouse, an ice house, and a barn.

== History ==
=== Early history ===
The Paežeriai manor was originally established around the 16th and 17th centuries when the area was intensively resettled. There are no surviving records of any manor buildings from that time. During and after the Lithuanian Crusade the lands surrounding the manor and the whole Sudovia were largely abandoned. Uncultivated land turned into dense forests. After the end of Polish–Lithuanian–Teutonic War, the decline of Teutonic influence and the rise of serfdom in the Grand Duchy of Lithuania led to a more intensive economic life in the region. In the 16th and 17th centuries (especially after the Volok Reform), the Paežeriai manor was established on the then-significant Kybartai road.

During the reign of King Casimir IV Jogailaitis, Paežeriai became the property of Michael Glinski.

=== 18th-19th century ===
Coat of Arms of Zabiela family

In the middle of the 18th century, Paežeriai was in possession of the Zabiełłos of Raudondvaris. Family owned several dozen more manors in the territory of the Grand Duchy of Lithuania. Szymon Zabiełło, a vice-brigadier of the Lithuanian cavalry, founded the construction of the current manor.

Zabiela invited Marcin Knackfus, a professor at Vilnius University and a pioneer of classicist architecture in Lithuania, to design a new manor. Knackfus, fearing repressions from the Tsar, settled in Paežeriai after the 1794 uprising and designed the Paežeriai Manor House in Louis XVI style. Paežeriai is believed to have been his last project.

After the death of Szymon Zabiełło in 1824, Paežeriai passed to the Gawroński family, who finished the interior works of the manor. In the mid-19th century, the family acquired more estates in Sudovia. The Gawrońskis managed the manor on an industrial model. In 1877, a water mill, a brickyard, and an agricultural machinery repair workshop were operating on the estate. The main income came from the production of spirits. The Gawrońskis did not live permanently on the estate. They visited the manor only during the summer.

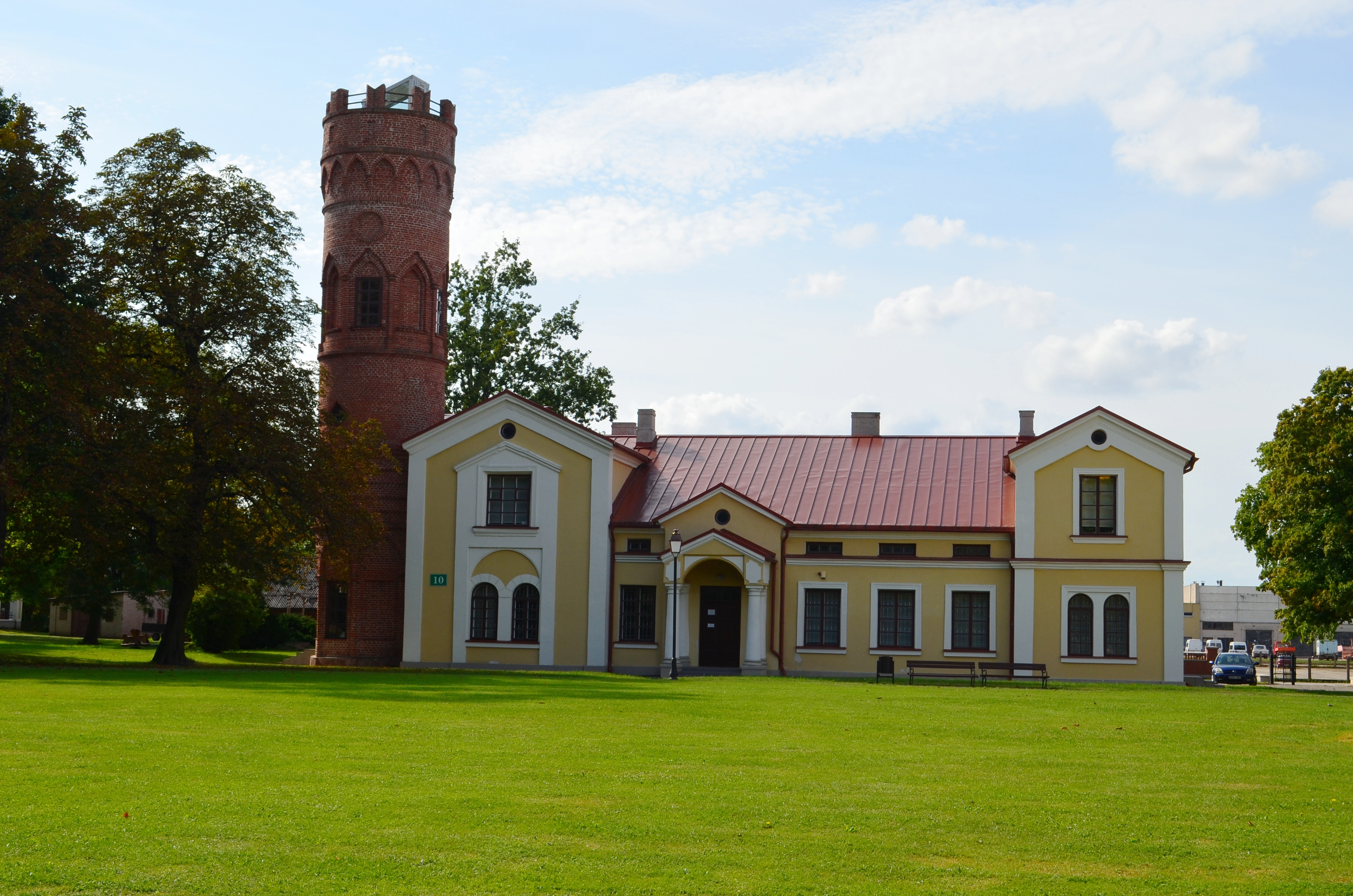
Manor administration building and Belvederis tower.

=== 20th century ===
After the death of the last member of the family Vladimiras Gavronskis (Włodzimierz Gawroński) in 1914, Paežeriai Manor was the full-time home of his widow Ona Gavronskienė née Komaraitė (Anna Gawrońska), who opened a primary school for the children of the estate staff in the manor's administration building. She became influential in the Vilkaviškis town government, as sometimes Lithuanian military men were sent to her to help with the manor's maintenance. After twenty years as a landlady, the widow decided to sell the manor in 1939 and move to Warsaw. The further fate of Ona Gavronskienė is unknown. It is believed that she ended up in the Stutthof concentration camp and died there.

In 1939, the manor was acquired by the signatory Jonas Vailokaitis, who fled to Germany at the outbreak of the World War II in May 1940. Later, the manor housed an agricultural school, which was closed in the spring of 1942 to accommodate Theodor Adrian von Renteln, the Commissar General of the German occupation authorities. Officers and guests from the occupying German government gathered in the manor for meetings. On the orders of Renteln, the manor was renovated by Dutch craftsmen. At the end of the war, seeing the advancing Red Army, Renteln looted the manor and fled.

During Soviet occupation the manor was the seat of the Vilkaviškis Kolūkis for a period from 1945 to 1952. From 1952 to 1994, the manor complex was used by the Vilkaviškis Melioration Construction Installation Authority (MSMV).

=== Present day ===
After Lithuanian independence, the manor was handed over to the Vilkaviškis District Municipality administration, and in July 1995, it was entrusted to the Lithuanian National Museum of Art. In 1998, the Vilkaviškis Regional Museum was established, at the end of 2003 the National Museum of Art transferred the palace to the Marijampolė County Governor's Administration, and at the beginning of 2004 the Suvalkija (Sudovia) Regional Cultural Centre-Museum was established here.
