= Act of Independence of the Republic of Costa Rica =

The Act of Independence of the Republic of Costa Rica was enacted 15 September 1821. The act enabled separation from the rule of Spain and allowed for it to eventually form the Federal Republic of Central America with other States.

The Act of October 29 says:

“Number 57. In the city of Cartago, in the 29th day of October eighteen twenty one –1821–; having the premises of the plausible news that the oath of independence had been sworn at the Capital of Mexico and at the Province of Nicaragua; and being united in extraordinary open Cabildo –municipal council– the very Nobel and Loyal Communes –the Municipality– of this city, the Vicar and the ruler Priest, the Minister of Public Finances, an innumerable number of well renowned people and village people; the official letters –oficios– and the Mayor Edict –Bando– of the Superior Political Chief, Mr. Miguel Gonzalez Saravia of the current 11th and 18th, were read and, in conformity with the vote of the parties of Nicaragua, it was sworn in Leon, on the 11th day of the same month the absolute independence from Spanish Government, under the plan that Mexican Empiry shall adopt. Having read also a manifesto of Guatemala about the True aspect of their independence, by unanimous votes of all the present people, the following has been agreed: 1° It shall be published, proclaimed and sworn solemnly on Thursday 1 November, the absolute independence from the Spanish Government: 2° It shall be observed in an absolute manner The Constitution and the laws promulgated by the Mexican Empire, in the firm conviction that in the adoption of this plan lies the happiness and the true interests of these provinces: 3° It shall be of immediate procedure that the oath from the correspondent Subordinate Political Chief be sworn before the very Nobel and Loyal Communes, the cited Lord Vicar Mr. Pedro Alvarado and the ruler Priest, and before the Minister of Public Finances, Mr. Manuel Garcia Escalante; and according to article 1°, to all authorities: 4° It shall be published by Mayor Edict this agreement with the insertion of the articles that Lord Superior Political Chief determines by Edict: 5° It has immediately being sworn by the Lord Subordinate Political Chief the oath on the hands of Lord Mayor 1st and the very Nobel and Loyal Communes, the Ecclesiasticus Vicar, the ruler Priest, –other– Ecclesiastics, all the presents and the Deputy of Finance on the hands of the cited Lord; the underwriters have signed before me, the undersigned Secretary, which I hereby certify.”
