= List of members of the Constituent Assembly of Lithuania =

Members of the Constituent Assembly of Lithuania were elected in the Lithuanian parliamentary election in April 1920. The assembly had 112 seats. Resigned members were replaced by lower-ranked candidates from the same electoral list and electoral district.

== Elected deputies ==
#	Name	Age (Note: As listed in the official results published in Laikinosios Vyriausybės Žinios.)	Occupation	Parliamentary fraction	Resigned on	Electoral district	Electoral list
1	Juozas Akmenskis	36	Cooperative activist	Christian Democrats		IV (Telšiai)	Christian Democrats
2	Kazys Ambrozaitis	27	Farmer	Christian Democrats		III (Raseiniai)	Christian Democrats
3	Jonas Andziulis	53	Farmer	Christian Democrats	4 February 1921	II (Kaunas)	Christian Democrats
4	Stasys Balčas	34	Soldier, farmer	Christian Democrats		V (Panevėžys)	Christian Democrats
5	Stasys Balčytis	26	Teacher	Christian Democrats	16 September 1921	III (Raseiniai)	Christian Democrats
6	Andrius Banionis	33	Organist	Christian Democrats		I (Marijampolė)	Christian Democrats
7	Viktoras Beržinskas	46	Worker	Christian Democrats		II (Kaunas)	Labor Federation
8	Vytautas Pranas Bičiūnas	27	Writer	Christian Democrats		III (Raseiniai)	Christian Democrats
9	Kipras Bielinis	36	Bookkeeper	Social Democrats		V (Panevėžys)	Social Democrats
10	Jonas Bildušas	26	Official	Popular Socialist and Peasant	30 September 1921	III (Raseiniai)	Popular Socialist Democrats
11	Kazys Bizauskas	27	Activist	Christian Democrats	10 March 1922	V (Panevėžys)	Christian Democrats
12	Konstantas Bražėnas	26	Student	Christian Democrats		VI (Utena)	Christian Democrats
13	Antanas Bulionis	39	Worker	Christian Democrats		II (Kaunas)	Labor Federation
14	Juozas Buzelis	31	Physician	Popular Socialist and Peasant		VI (Utena)	Popular Socialist Democrats
15	Bronislovas Cirtautas	39	Judge	Social Democrats		III (Raseiniai)	Social Democrats
16	Voldemaras Vytautas Čarneckis	28	Minister	Christian Democrats	4 November 1921	IV (Telšiai)	Christian Democrats
17	Vincas Čepinskis	49	Lecturer	Social Democrats		II (Kaunas)	Social Democrats
18	Jurgis Daukšys	42	Worker	Social Democrats		V (Panevėžys)	Social Democrats
19	Jurgis Deksnys	48	Worker	Christian Democrats	5 April 1921	V (Panevėžys)	Labor Federation
20	Stasys Digrys	32	Official	Social Democrats		III (Raseiniai)	Social Democrats
21	Povilas Dogelis	42	Priest	Christian Democrats		III (Raseiniai)	Christian Democrats
22	Eliziejus Draugelis	32	Minister	Christian Democrats		I (Marijampolė)	Christian Democrats
23	Magdalena Draugelytė-Galdikienė	28	Teacher	Christian Democrats		II (Kaunas)	Christian Democrats
24	Ozeris Finkelšteinas	56	Attorney	Jewish		III (Raseiniai)	Democratic Jewish Union
25	Naftalis Fridmanas	56	Attorney	Jewish	30 August 1921 (Note: Due to death)	V (Panevėžys)	Democratic Jewish Union
26	Jonas Galvydis-Bykauskas	49	General	Christian Democrats	17 December 1921	VI (Utena)	Christian Democrats
27	Kazys Gencevičius	32	Craftsman	Popular Socialist and Peasant	4 November 1921	II (Kaunas)	Popular Socialist Democrats
28	Jonas Giniūnas	33	Worker	Christian Democrats	24 February 1922	I (Marijampolė)	Christian Democrats
29	Adolfas Grajevskis	43	Attorney	Polish	(Note: Suspended his participation in the assembly on 9 July 1921, but did not formally resign.)	III (Raseiniai)	Central Polish Electoral Committee
30	Antanas Grigiškis	24	Farmer	Popular Socialist and Peasant		IV (Telšiai)	Peasant Union
31	Kazys Grinius	53	Physician	Popular Socialist and Peasant		I (Marijampolė)	Peasant Union
32	Stanislovas Gruodis	24	Farmer	Christian Democrats		VI (Utena)	Christian Democrats
33	Petras Jočys	25	Official	Christian Democrats		V (Panevėžys)	Labor Federation
34	Kazimieras Jokantas	38	Physician	Christian Democrats		V (Panevėžys)	Christian Democrats
35	Vladas Jurgutis	34	Priest	Christian Democrats	3 March 1922	III (Raseiniai)	Christian Democrats
36	Steponas Kairys	40	Engineer	Social Democrats		VI (Utena)	Social Democrats
37	Vincas Katilius	51	Farmer	Christian Democrats	5 April 1921	I (Marijampolė)	Christian Democrats
38	Julius Kaupas	30	Sociologist	Christian Democrats		II (Kaunas)	Farmers' Association (Note: Electoral list of the Farmers's Association merged with the electoral list of Christian Democrats in I (Kaunas).)
39	Rudolfas Kinderis	38	Official	German	15 September 1920	II (Kaunas)	Lithuanian German Committee
40	Jonas Kriščiūnas	32	Agronomist	Popular Socialist and Peasant		I (Marijampolė)	Peasant Union
41	Pijus Kriščiūnas	39	Farmer	Christian Democrats		II (Kaunas)	Farmers' Association
42	Mykolas Krupavičius	36	Priest	Christian Democrats		IV (Telšiai) (Note: He was also elected in V (Panevėžys) but gave up his seat for Juozas Žebrauskas.)	Christian Democrats
43	Kazys Kupčiūnas	30	Teacher	Popular Socialist and Peasant		IV (Telšiai)	Peasant Union
44	Povilas Kuzminskis	26	Farmer	Popular Socialist and Peasant		IV (Telšiai)	Peasant Union
45	Vladas Lašas	28	Physician	Popular Socialist and Peasant		VI (Utena)	Peasant Union
46	Kazys Lekeckas	43	Official	Social Democrats	12 September 1920	IV (Telšiai)	Socialist Company of Workers and Farmers
47	Bronislovas Liausas (Note: Took place of Romanas Zaremba who resigned before the first session of the assembly but was listed in results published in Lietuva.)	48	Priest	Polish		II (Kaunas)	Central Polish Electoral Committee
48	Juozas Lukoševičius	28	Official	Popular Socialist and Peasant	15 January 1921	III (Raseiniai)	Peasant Union
49	Jonas Makauskis	34	Pharmacist	Popular Socialist and Peasant		III (Raseiniai)	Popular Socialist Democrats
50	Jonas Masiulis	40	Agronomist	Popular Socialist and Peasant	6 July 1920	V (Panevėžys)	Peasant Union
51	Antanas Matulaitis	24	Soldier	Christian Democrats	17 January 1921	V (Panevėžys)	Labor Federation
52	Jonas Matulevičius	45	Farmer	Popular Socialist and Peasant		I (Marijampolė)	Peasant Union
53	Vincas Meilus	33	Official	Popular Socialist and Peasant	4 November 1921	VI (Utena)	Peasant Union
54	Vincentas Mieleška (Milaška)	27	Priest	Christian Democrats		V (Panevėžys)	Christian Democrats
55	Feliksas Mikšys	27–28	Veterinarian	Christian Democrats		VI (Utena)	Christian Democrats
56	Antanas Milčius	28	Jurist	Christian Democrats		V (Panevėžys)	Labor Federation
57	Ona Muraškaitė-Račiukaitienė	24	Teacher	Christian Democrats		I (Marijampolė)	Christian Democrats
58	Ladas Natkevičius	27	Soldier	Popular Socialist and Peasant		I (Marijampolė)	Popular Socialist Democrats
59	Jonas Pakalka	28	Official	Social Democrats		II (Kaunas)	Social Democrats
60	Gabrielė Petkevičaitė	59	Writer	Popular Socialist and Peasant	15 September 1920	V (Panevėžys)	Popular Socialist Democrats
61	Motiejus Petrauskas	30	Official	Popular Socialist and Peasant	23 June 1920	III (Raseiniai)	Peasant Union
62	Jeronimas Plečkaitis	32	Teacher	Social Democrats		II (Kaunas)	Social Democrats
63	Abraomas Popelis	50	Rabbi	Jewish		I (Marijampolė)	Democratic Jewish Union
64	Vladas Požela	39	Jurist	Social Democrats		V (Panevėžys) (Note: He was also elected in II (Kaunas) but gave up his seat for Jonas Pakalka.)	Social Democrats
65	Antanas Purėnas	37	Teacher	Social Democrats	13 October 1920	VI (Utena)	Social Democrats
66	Juozas Purickis	37	Priest	Christian Democrats		VI (Utena)	Christian Democrats
67	Nachmanas Rachmilevičius	48	Physician	Jewish		IV (Telšiai)	Democratic Jewish Union
68	Vytautas Račkauskas	39	Engineer	Popular Socialist and Peasant		III (Raseiniai)	Peasant Union
69	Petras Radzevičius	26	Activist	Christian Democrats		II (Kaunas)	Labor Federation
70	Kazimieras Ralys	34	Official	Popular Socialist and Peasant		IV (Telšiai)	Peasant Union
71	Sikstas Riauka	33	Cooperative activist	Christian Democrats		IV (Telšiai)	Christian Democrats
72	Albinas Rimka	34	Editor	Popular Socialist and Peasant	25 May 1921	II (Kaunas) (Note: He was also elected in IV (Telšiai) but gave up his seat for Antanas Grigiškis.)	Peasant Union
73	Simonas Rozenbaumas	61	Attorney	Jewish		II (Kaunas)	Democratic Jewish Union
74	Mikas Rožanskas	35	Farmer	Christian Democrats		V (Panevėžys)	Labor Federation
75	Petras Ruseckas	36	Soldier	Popular Socialist and Peasant		V (Panevėžys)	Peasant Union
76	Kazys Sidabras	?	Farmer	Popular Socialist and Peasant	17 January 1921	IV (Telšiai)	Peasant Union
77	Antanas Simanauskas	33	Farm worker	Christian Democrats		V (Panevėžys)	Labor Federation
78	Vladas Sirutavičius	42	Engineer	Social Democrats	17 January 1921	V (Panevėžys)	Social Democrats
79	Mykolas Sleževičius	43	Attorney	Popular Socialist and Peasant		I (Marijampolė) (Note: He was also elected in II (Kaunas) but gave up his seat for Kazys Gencevičius; III (Raseiniai) where he gave up his seat for Jonas Makauskas; IV (Telšiai) where he gave up his seat for Matas Untulis; and in VI (Utena) where he gave up his seat for Juozas Buzelis.)	Popular Socialist Democrats
80	Maksas Soloveičikas	36	Physician	Jewish		VI (Utena)	Democratic Jewish Union
81	Emilija Spudaitė-Gvildienė	32	Teacher	Christian Democrats		V (Panevėžys)	Christian Democrats
82	Povilas Spudas (Note: Took place of soldier Jonas Laurinaitis who resigned before the first session of the assembly but was listed in results published in Lietuva.)	24	Teacher	Christian Democrats		V (Panevėžys)	Christian Democrats
83	Salomėja Stakauskaitė	28	Teacher	Christian Democrats		III (Raseiniai)	Christian Democrats
84	Zigmas Starkus	27	Activist	Christian Democrats		VI (Utena)	Christian Democrats
85	Antanas Staugaitis	44	Official	Christian Democrats		I (Marijampolė)	Christian Democrats
86	Jonas Staugaitis	51	Physician	Popular Socialist and Peasant		VI (Utena) (Note: He was also elected in II (Kaunas) but gave up his seat for Albinas Rimka.)	Peasant Union
87	Justinas Staugaitis	53	Priest	Christian Democrats		I (Marijampolė)	Christian Democrats
88	Aleksandras Stulginskis	35	Agronomist	Christian Democrats		I (Marijampolė)	Christian Democrats
89	Pranas Šalčius	35	Worker	Christian Democrats		I (Marijampolė)	Christian Democrats
90	Kazimieras Steponas Šaulys	48	Priest	Christian Democrats	25 July 1922	II (Kaunas)	Christian Democrats
91	Pranas Šaulys	32	Farmer	Christian Democrats	20 October 1920	III (Raseiniai)	Christian Democrats
92	Pranas Šemiotas	26	Smith	Social Democrats		V (Panevėžys)	Social Democrats
93	Antanas Šilgalis	34	Farmer	Christian Democrats		IV (Telšiai)	Christian Democrats
94	Antanas Šmulkštys	34	Priest	Christian Democrats		I (Marijampolė)	Christian Democrats
95	Vincas Šmulkštys	27	Soldier	Christian Democrats		I (Marijampolė)	Christian Democrats
96	Antanas Šnielevskis	34	Worker	Polish		II (Kaunas)	Central Polish Electoral Committee
97	Antanas Tamošaitis	27	Teacher	Popular Socialist and Peasant		VI (Utena)	Peasant Union
98	Stasys Tijūnaitis	31	Teacher	Christian Democrats		I (Marijampolė)	Christian Democrats
99	Antanas Tumėnas	40	Jurist	Christian Democrats		VI (Utena)	Christian Democrats
100	Matas Untulis	30	Jurist	Popular Socialist and Peasant	15 October 1920	IV (Telšiai)	Popular Socialist Democrats
101	Jonas Vailokaitis	34	Banker	Christian Democrats	3 March 1922	II (Kaunas)	Farmers' Association
102	Juozas Vailokaitis	41	Priest	Christian Democrats		I (Marijampolė)	Christian Democrats
103	Klemensas Vaitekūnas	31	Physician	Christian Democrats		V (Panevėžys)	Christian Democrats
104	Jonas Valaitis	27	Cooperative activist	Christian Democrats	17 February 1922	II (Kaunas)	Labor Federation
105	Jonas Valickis	28	Teacher	Christian Democrats		IV (Telšiai)	Christian Democrats
106	Jonas Varnas	50	Farmer	Christian Democrats		VI (Utena)	Christian Democrats
107	Kazimieras Venclauskis	39	Attorney	Social Democrats		V (Panevėžys)	Social Democrats
108	Juozas Volodkevičius	50	Farmer	Christian Democrats	15 September 1920	I (Marijampolė)	Christian Democrats
109	Juozas Žebrauskas	32	Tailor	Christian Democrats		V (Panevėžys)	Christian Democrats
110	Jurgis Žitinevičius	49	Farmer	Independent		II (Kaunas)	Peasant Union
111	Antanas Žoromskis	28	Pharmacist	Popular Socialist and Peasant		III (Raseiniai)	Peasant Union
112	Konstantinas Žukas	36	Soldier	Popular Socialist and Peasant	30 June 1921	I (Marijampolė)	Popular Socialist Democrats

== Deputies who replaced resigned members ==
#	Name	Parliamentary fraction	Tenure (from)	Tenure (to)	As replacement for
1	Tadas Aleliūnas	Christian Democrats	5 April 1921		Antanas Matulaitis
2	Mikas Bagdonas	Christian Democrats	15 September 1920	27 January 1922	Juozas Volodkevičius
3	Kazys Bieliūnas	Popular Socialist and Peasant	18 November 1921		Vincas Meilus
4	Oskaras Biuchleris	German	15 September 1920		Rudolfas Kinderis
5	Jonas Bliūdžius	Popular Socialist and Peasant	16 December 1921		Konstantinas Žukas
6	Felicija Bortkevičienė (Note: She was initially elected in I (Marijampolė) and IV (Telšiai) but gave up her seat.)	Popular Socialist and Peasant	15 January 1921		Juozas Lukoševičius
7	Liūdas Brokas	Christian Democrats	30 June 1922		Pranas Povilaitis
8	Stasys Černiauskas	Christian Democrats	14 March 1922		Kazys Bizauskas
9	Kostas Daunora	Christian Democrats	11 November 1921		Voldemaras Vytautas Čarneckis
10	Vincas Grajauskas	Christian Democrats	17 March 1922		Jonas Vailokaitis
11	Pranas Grėbliūnas	Christian Democrats	7 March 1922		Jonas Giniūnas
12	Juozas Idzelis	Christian Democrats	13 July 1922		Kazys Vosylius
13	Andrius Kardišauskas	Christian Democrats	19 April 1921		Vincas Katilius
14	Samuelis Landau	Jewish	20 September 1921		Naftalis Fridmanas
15	Feliksas Lesauskas	Christian Democrats	20 October 1920	22 November 1921	Pranas Šaulys
16	Juozas Liekis	Popular Socialist and Peasant	20 October 1920		Jonas Valius
17	Jonas Lingė	Christian Democrats	18 January 1922		Jonas Galvydis-Bykauskas
18	Morta Lukošytė	Christian Democrats	20 January 1922		Feliksas Lesauskas
19	Pulgis Lumbis	Christian Democrats	25 July 1922		Kazimieras Steponas Šaulys
20	Veronika Mackevičiūtė	Christian Democrats	29 April 1921		Jurgis Deksnys
21	Jurgis Marčiulionis	Christian Democrats	22 January 1922		Mikas Bagdonas
22	Mykolas Marma	Popular Socialist and Peasant	13 January 1922		Kazys Škirpa
23	Pranas Povilaitis	Christian Democrats	21 February 1922	16 June 1922	Jonas Valaitis
24	Antanas Povylius	Social Democrats	24 May 1921		Vladas Sirutavičius
25	Juozas Pronskus	Popular Socialist and Peasant	15 October 1920		Matas Untulis
26	Pranas Radzevičius	Popular Socialist and Peasant	18 November 1921		Kazys Gencevičius
27	Klemensas Skabeika	Popular Socialist and Peasant	17 January 1921	25 October 1921	Kazys Sidabras
28	Juozas Skyrius	Christian Democrats	21 March 1922		Vladas Jurgutis
29	Jonas Steponavičius	Christian Democrats	4 February 1921		Jonas Andziulis
30	Kazys Škirpa	Popular Socialist and Peasant	15 September 1920	7 December 1921	Gabrielė Petkevičaitė
31	Pranas Šmotelis	Popular Socialist and Peasant	25 November 1921		Klemensas Skabeika
32	Eduardas Šukevičius	Social Democrats	13 October 1920		Antanas Purėnas
33	Vaclovas Vaidotas	Popular Socialist and Peasant	28 October 1921		Jonas Bildušas
34	Jonas Valius	Popular Socialist and Peasant	23 June 1920	20 October 1920	Motiejus Petrauskas
35	Kazys Vosylius	Christian Democrats	4 November 1921	4 July 1922	Stasys Balčytis
36	Vincas Žindžius	Popular Socialist and Peasant	16 September 1921		Albinas Rimka
37	Kazys Zubauskas	Independent	12 September 1920		Kazys Lekeckas
38	Balys Žygelis	Popular Socialist and Peasant	6 July 1920		Jonas Masiulis

== Notable candidates who were not elected ==
Name	Electoral list	Electoral district
Jurgis Alekna	Democratic National Freedom League	I (Marijampolė), II (Kaunas), V (Panevėžys)
Danielius Alseika	Popular Socialist Democrats	II (Kaunas), VI (Utena)
Juozas Bagdonas	Democratic National Freedom League	I (Marijampolė), II (Kaunas)
Juozas Balčikonis	Nonpartisan group	V (Panevėžys)
Saliamonas Banaitis	Economic and Political Union of Lithuanian Farmers	II (Kaunas)
Jonas Basanavičius	Party of National Progress	II (Kaunas)
Vaclovas Bielskis	Social Democrats	II (Kaunas), III (Raseiniai)
Jurgis Byla	Social Democrats	II (Kaunas)
Stasys Čiurlionis	Nonpartisan group	I (Marijampolė)
Jurgis Čiurlys	Social Democrats	III (Raseiniai)
Feliksas Bugailiškis	Social Democrats	III (Raseiniai)
Ernestas Galvanauskas	Nonpartisan group	V (Panevėžys)
Leyb Gorfinkel	Democratic Jewish Union	III (Raseiniai)
Vincas Grybas	Social Democrats	II (Kaunas)
Augustinas Janulaitis	Social Democrats	III (Raseiniai)
Antanas Jurgelionis	Peasant Union	VI (Utena)
Jonas Kardelis	Peasant Union	VI (Utena)
Adolfas Klimas	Peasant Union, Popular Socialist Democrats	I (Marijampolė), II (Kaunas)
Petras Leonas	Democratic National Freedom League	I (Marijampolė), II (Kaunas), IV (Telšiai), V (Panevėžys)
Silvestras Leonas	Democratic National Freedom League	I (Marijampolė), II (Kaunas), V (Panevėžys)
Donatas Malinauskas	Party of National Progress	II (Kaunas)
Jonas Mašiotas	Democratic National Freedom League	I (Marijampolė), V (Panevėžys)
Pranas Mašiotas	Democratic National Freedom League	I (Marijampolė), II (Kaunas)
Povilas Matulionis	Party of National Progress	II (Kaunas)
Antanas Merkys	Nonpartisan group	V (Panevėžys)
Vladas Mironas	Economic and Political Union of Lithuanian Farmers	I (Marijampolė)
Kazys Musteikis	Popular Socialist Democrats	VI (Utena)
Tomas Naruševičius	Democratic National Freedom League	I (Marijampolė), II (Kaunas), V (Panevėžys)
Stanisław Narutowicz	Independent	IV (Telšiai)
Liudas Noreika	Economic and Political Union of Lithuanian Farmers, Party of National Progress	I (Marijampolė), IV (Telšiai)
Juozas Paknys	Social Democrats	III (Raseiniai)
Juozas Papečkys	Peasant Union	I (Marijampolė)
Tadas Petkevičius	Democratic National Freedom League	I (Marijampolė), II (Kaunas), V (Panevėžys)
Alfonsas Petrulis	Party of National Progress	IV (Telšiai), V (Panevėžys)
Vytautas Petrulis	Nonpartisan group	V (Panevėžys)
Adomas Prūsas	Party of National Progress	II (Kaunas)
Sofija Pšibiliauskienė	Popular Socialist Democrats	IV (Telšiai)
Vladas Putvinskis	Democratic National Freedom League	I (Marijampolė), II (Kaunas), V (Panevėžys)
Petras Ruseckas	Peasant Union	I (Marijampolė)
Konstantinas Šakenis	Party of National Progress	V (Panevėžys)
Matas Šalčius	Democratic National Freedom League	I (Marijampolė), IV (Telšiai)
Jurgis Šaulys	Popular Socialist Democrats	IV (Telšiai)
Jokūbas Šernas	Party of National Progress	II (Kaunas), V (Panevėžys)
Jonas Šimoliūnas	Nonpartisan group	I (Marijampolė)
Rapolas Skipitis	Democratic National Freedom League	I (Marijampolė), II (Kaunas), V (Panevėžys)
Rokas Šliūpas	Nonpartisan group	I (Marijampolė)
Adolfas Sruoga	Democratic National Freedom League	I (Marijampolė), II (Kaunas), V (Panevėžys)
Balys Sruoga	Democratic National Freedom League	II (Kaunas), V (Panevėžys)
Juozas Tūbelis	Economic and Political Union of Lithuanian Farmers	III (Raseiniai)
Juozas Tumas	Party of National Progress	II (Kaunas)
Juozas Urbšys	Social Democrats	II (Kaunas), V (Panevėžys)
Juozas Vaičkus	Group of People	IV (Telšiai)
Liudas Vailionis	Nonpartisan group	I (Marijampolė)
Antanas Vienuolis	Democratic National Freedom League	I (Marijampolė), II (Kaunas), V (Panevėžys)
Juozas Vokietaitis	Party of National Progress	II (Kaunas)
Augustinas Voldemaras	Party of National Progress	II (Kaunas)
Martynas Yčas	Party of National Progress	V (Panevėžys)
Aleksandras Žilinskas	Economic and Political Union of Lithuanian Farmers	I (Marijampolė), II (Kaunas)
Antanas Žmuidzinavičius	Nonpartisan group	I (Marijampolė)
Justinas Zubrickas	Democratic National Freedom League	I (Marijampolė), II (Kaunas), V (Panevėžys)

== Bibliography ==
- Ragauskas, Aivas; Tamošaitis, Mindaugas, eds. (2006). Lietuvos Steigiamojo Seimo (1920–1922 metų) narių biografinis žodynas. Didysis Lietuvos parlamentarų biografinis žodynas (in Lithuanian). Vol. 2. Vilnius: Vilniaus pedagoginis universitetas. ISBN 9789955201465.
