= 1922 Constitution of Lithuania =

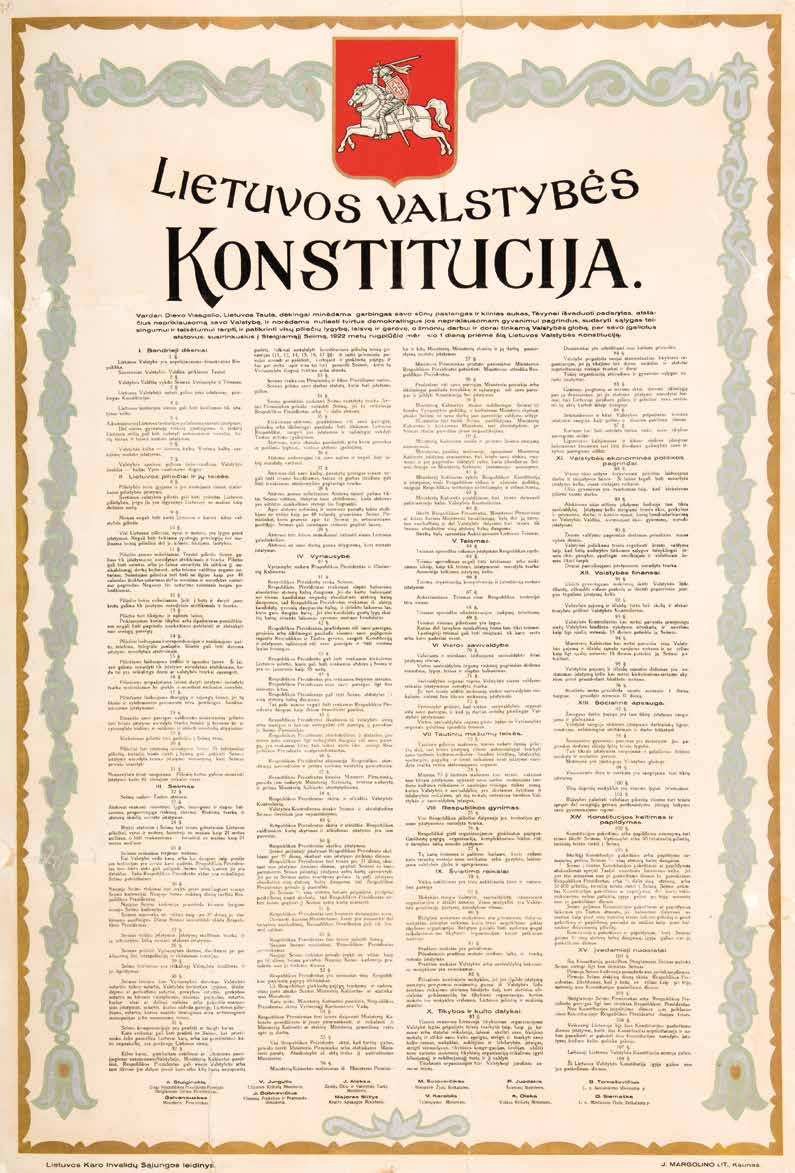
1922 Constitution of Lithuania

Constitution of the State of Lithuania of 1922 (Lithuanian: 1922 m. Lietuvos Valstybės Konstitucija) was Lithuania's first permanent democratic constitution that was adopted on 1 August 1922. The Constitution of the Republic of Lithuania was approved by the Constituent Seimas and promulgated by the chairman of the Constituent Seimas, Aleksandras Stulginskis, who was then also the President of the Republic of Lithuania. The first permanent constitution of Lithuania consisted of a preamble and 108 articles divided into 15 chapters. It succeeded the Temporary Constitution of 1920. The constitution of 1922 was suspended in 1926 following the coup d'état, and for the next two years, Lithuania was under martial law. A new constitution was adopted in 1928.

== Background ==
At the beginning of 1919, the Lithuanian government began to outline a new permanent constitution for Lithuania, as after the first session of the Constituent Seimas on 15 May 1920, the Temporary Constitution of 1919 would be no longer in force, as the existence of a Constituent Seimas was in contradiction with the Constitutional principles. Due to the Polish–Lithuanian War Constituent Seimas did not have sufficient time to draft a permanent constitution, and in 1920 a new temporary constitution was adopted. After the war, in December, a commission of specialists was set up to draft a permanent constitution. The main provisions of this draft were as follows: a unicameral Seimas elected for a three-year term; the president elected by the Seimas for a three-year term; the prime minister, at the invitation of the president, to form a Cabinet of Ministers and supervise its functions.

== Preparation and adoption ==
The same Constituent Assembly that drafted and adopted the 1920 Provisional Constitution contributed to the drafting of this Constitution, but certain provisions had already changed radically. During the drafting of this Constitution, the Social Democrats and Lithuanian Popular Peasants' Union proposed to abolish the presidency, to introduce the election of judges, to separate the Church from the State, and to guarantee the freedom of strikes. The Christian Democrats were in favour of the presidency, opposed the election of judges and other more liberal ideas, and wanted to give more privileges to the Church.

== Contents ==
The Preamble proclaims that the Constitution was adopted by the Lithuanian people through their elected representatives assembled in the Constituent Seimas. Lithuania is proclaimed a democratic republic in which the sovereign power of the State rests with the Lithuanian People. The Seimas, the Government and the Courts shall be entrusted with the exercising of State power. The principle of the separation of powers is proclaimed, the supremacy of the Constitution (no legal act may contradict it) is entrusted to the legislature, and a complex procedure for amending the Constitution is established (1/4 of the members of the Seimas, the government or 50 000 citizens with the right to vote in the Seimas could initiate an amendment of the Constitution. The decision could be adopted by the Seimas in two procedures: a decision adopted by a 3/5 majority of the Seimas would enter into force after 3 months; if no referendum was called, a decision adopted by a 4/5 majority of the Seimas would enter into force as of the date of its adoption). The Constitution establishes a parliamentary system of government, and fundamental human rights, and proclaims state-guaranteed protection in old age, sickness and unemployment.

== Drafting committee ==
The constitution was drafted by a 14-member committee:

- Members of the Lithuanian Christian Democratic Party: Kazys Bizauskas, Zigmas Starkus, Justinas Staugaitis, Kazimieras Steponas Šaulys, Antanas Tumėnas, Juozas Vailokaitis.
- Members of the Lithuanian Popular Socialist Democratic Party: Kazys Grinius, Gabrielė Petkevičaitė-Bitė, Mykolas Sleževičius, Matas Untulis
- Members of the Social Democratic Party of Lithuania: Vincas Čepinskis, Kazimieras Venclauskis
- Jewish representative: Maksas Soloveičikas
- Polish representative: Adolf Grajewski
