= Liberalism in Lithuania =

This article gives an overview of liberalism in Lithuania. Liberalism was a major force in Lithuania since 1900. Next to the urban citizens, agrarian liberal parties became active. It is limited to liberal parties with substantial support, mainly proved by having had a representation in parliament. The sign ⇒ denotes another party in that scheme. For inclusion in this scheme it isn't necessary so that parties labeled themselves as a liberal party.

== History ==
After the restoration of independence in 1990 liberal parties arose again. Currently, the Liberal Movement and Freedom and Justice are centre-right liberal parties, and the Freedom Party is a centrist liberal party.

=== Lithuanian Democratic Party ===
- 1902: Liberal intellectuals and dissident social democrats formed the Lithuanian Democratic Party (Lietuvių Demokratų Partija).
- 1905: The LDP sponsored the forming of the ⇒ Lithuanian Peasants Union
- 1914: The LDP is renamed into Democratic Party of Lithuania (Lietuvos Demokratų Partija)
- 1917: A left wing faction formed the Lithuanian Popular Socialist Democratic Party and a moderate faction formed the ⇒ Democratic National Freedom League.
- 1920: The party is dissolved

=== From Lithuanian Peasants' Union to Lithuanian Popular Peasants' Union ===
- 1905: The ⇒ Lithuanian Democratic Party sponsored the foundation of the Lithuanian Peasants' Union (Lietuvos Valstiečių Sąjunga), a party working under supervision of the LDP
- 1920: The party became an independent party
- 1922: The party merged with the ⇒ Lithuanian Socialist Popular Democratic Party into the Lithuanian Popular Peasants' Union (Lietuvos Valstiečių Liaudininkų Sąjunga) under the leadership of Mykolas Sleževičius and Kazys Grinius
- 1935: The party is banned, but continued in exile
- 1990: It is refounded as a conservative-agrarian party

=== Lithuanian Socialist Popular Democratic Party ===
- 1917: A left wing faction of the ⇒ Lithuanian Democratic Party formed the Lithuanian Popular Socialist Democratic Party (Lietuvos Socialistų Liaudininkų Demokratų Partija)
- 1922: The party merged with the ⇒ Lithuanian Peasants' Union into the ⇒ Lithuanian Popular Peasants' Union

=== From Democratic National Freedom League to Farmers Party ===
- 1917: A moderate faction of the ⇒ Lithuanian Democratic Party formed the Democratic National Freedom League (Demokratinė Tautos Laisvės Santara)
- 1925: The party is renamed into the Farmers Party (Ūkininkų Partija)
- 1928: The party is banned, but continued in exile

=== From Lithuanian Liberal Union to Freedom Party ===
- 1990: In newly independent Lithuania liberals formed the Lithuanian Liberal Union (Lietuvos Liberalų Sąjunga).
- 1993: The Lithuanian Centre Union (Lietuvos Centro Sąjunga) is founded.
- 2002: A populist faction of the LLS formed the Liberal Democratic Party (Liberalų Demokratų Partija).
- 2003: The party merged with the ⇒ Lithuanian Centre Union and the Modern Christian Democratic Union into the Liberal and Centre Union (Liberalų ir Centro Sąjunga).
- 2002: An agrarian faction of the LCS formed the Lithuanian Centre Party (Lietuvos Centro Partija).
- 2006: The Liberals' Movement of the Republic of Lithuania was formed by the dissident members of LiCS.
- 2008: The National Resurrection Party (Tautos Prisikėlimo Partija) is founded.
- 2011: The TPP merged into the ⇒ LiCS.
- 2019: The Freedom Party (Laisvės Partija) was formed by the former members of LRLS.

=== New Union Social Liberals ===
- 1998: Artūras Paulauskas launched the New Union (Social Liberals) (Naujoji sąjunga (socialliberalai))
- 2011: The party merged into the ⇒ Labour Party
- 2019: Paulauskas launched Strong Lithuania in United Europe (Stipri Lietuva vieningoje Europoje)

=== Lithuanian Freedom Union (Liberals) to Freedom and Justice ===
- 2011: The YES – Homeland Revival and Perspective (TAIP – Tėvynės atgimimas ir perspektyva) is founded by Artūras Zuokas.
- 2014: The Liberal and Centre Union merged with YES into the ⇒ Lithuanian Freedom Union (Liberals) (Lietuvos Laisvės Sąjunga (Liberalai)).
- 2020: The Lithuanian Freedom Union (Liberals) merged with Order and Justice (originally ⇒ Liberal Democratic Party) and with ⇒ Strong Lithuania in United Europe into Freedom and Justice (Laisvė ir teisingumas).

== Liberal leaders ==
- Jonas Vileišis - Mykolas Sleževičius - Kazys Grinius - Petras Auštrevičius - Remigijus Šimašius - Viktorija Čmilytė-Nielsen - Aušrinė Armonaitė

== Liberal think tanks ==
- Lithuanian Free Market Institute (LLRI)
- Taikomosios politikos institutas (TPI)

== See also ==
- History of Lithuania
- Politics of Lithuania
- List of political parties in Lithuania
