= Peasants' Union =

Peasants' Union or Peasant Union may refer to:

- Peasant Union (Lithuania) (1905–1922), political party in Lithuania
- Lithuanian Popular Peasants' Union (1922–1936), political party in Lithuania
- Peasant Union of Slovenia, former name of Slovenian People's Party, a political party in Slovenia
- International Peasants' Union, international organization
