= Plečkaitininkai =

The plečkaitininkai ("plečkaitists"), named after Jeronimas Plečkaitis, was a group of Lithuanian political opponents of the authoritarian regime of Antanas Smetona active abroad from 1927 to 1935. They were mainly social democrats who fled abroad after the unsuccessful Tauragė Revolt in September 1927. With support from Poland, they sought to organise a coup against the ruling Lithuanian Nationalist Union and engaged in limited terrorist activities (murder of Lithuanian police officers, bombing of Lithuanian police stations). The group continued to maintain relations with the Social Democratic Party of Lithuania but distanced themselves from the Communist Party of Lithuania. Plečkaitininkai did not enjoy any significant support in Lithuania, but the Lithuanian government used the threat of this group as one of the arguments for suppressing free press and spying on leftist organisations.

== Establishment ==
The military coup d'état of December 1926 installed the government of President Antanas Smetona and Prime Minister Augustinas Voldemaras that dissolved the Third Seimas (parliament). The opposition, mainly members of the Social Democratic Party of Lithuania and Lithuanian Popular Peasants' Union, attempted to overthrow Smetona's regime and organised the failed Tauragė Revolt on 9 September 1927. In the aftermath, about 60 rebels, including leaders Jeronimas Plečkaitis, Juozas Paplauskas and Juozas Kedys, escaped abroad. Plečkaitis and Paplauskas, former members of the Seimas, organized the men and were approached by a member of the Polish Socialist Party who introduced them to Tadeusz Hołówko, director of the Eastern Division in the Political Department of the Polish Ministry of Foreign Affairs. At the time, Lithuania–Poland relations entered a particularly hostile phase and there were fears that war might break out any moment over the bitter territorial dispute in the Vilnius Region. Therefore, Poland found it advantageous to support the group. Hołówko gave them $4,000 U.S. dollars (equivalent to $74,138 in 2025) and encouraged to organize a congress in Riga.

== Activities ==
=== Armed ===
Poland allowed plečkaitininkai to organise a military group in Lida, which at its peak in December 1927 numbered 74 people, and supplied it with cash, weapons, and instructors. The group, officially known as the Defence Guard of the Political Émigrés of the Republic of Lithuania (Lithuanian: Lietuvos respublikos politinių emigrantų gynimo gvardija), believed that Smetona's regime was fragile and that it could be overthrown by an armed coup. Poland used the group to increase pressure on Lithuania ahead of a December 1927 session by the League of Nations that discussed the Lithuanian–Polish dispute. Since both parties agreed to open direct negotiations, thus deflating the international tensions, and Poland was publicly called out for sponsoring armed anti-Lithuanian groups, plečkaitininkai lost their strategic importance to Poland and received less and less support. The military group did not want to become subordinates of the Polish military and was reorganised into a civilian group based in Grodno in March 1928. The group, treated as political refugees, was financed via the Red Cross. Ideological differences between Plečkaitis and Paplauskas led to the splintering of the group and its liquidation in 1929.

Plečkaitis wanted to organise a coup to overthrow Smetona's regime, but his efforts in 1928 were blocked by the Lithuanian intelligence. He and five others were arrested by the German police in September 1929 when they attempted to cross the Germany–Poland border. They were armed with seven bombs, four grenades, two shotguns, and six revolvers. Lithuanian news agency ELTA claimed that the group was planning to bomb a train that Prime Minister Augustinas Voldemaras took from Geneva. Plečkaitis received a three-year prison sentence, but was released earlier. Paplauskas supported long-term political agitation and terrorist attacks against Lithuanian police. His supporters established operational groups of five men that carried out murders of police officers and bombings of police stations, mostly along the disputed Lithuania–Poland border. The first attacks were carried out on 17 November 1928 – grenades exploded at an apartment of a police officer in Varėna and at a guard station in Alytus. Other attacks included the execution of two police agents in Kėdainiai area in May 1929 and a grenade explosion that killed a police officer at his apartment in Utena in June 1929. The attacks stopped that summer.

=== Political ===
The first plečkaitininkai conference took place in Riga on 5–6 November 1927. The conference unanimously adopted a resolution calling on the people to overthrow the illegitimate government of the Lithuanian Nationalist Union. The conference also called for the normalization of the Lithuania–Poland relations and a peaceful resolution to the disputes. Other marginalized groups, including the Communist Party of Lithuania and the Lithuanian section of the Union of Socialists-Revolutionaries-Maximalists, protested the conference for its friendliness to Poland and for excluding other political émigré groups.

The first political organization, the Committee of Lithuanian Political Émigrés (Lithuanian: Lietuvos politinių emigrantų komitetas), was established on 3 November 1927 and was chaired by Jeronimas Plečkaitis. On 22–23 August 1928, a conference in Vilnius established the Organization of Lithuanian Social Democrats Abroad (Lithuanian: Lietuvos socialdemokratų organizacija užsienyje or LSDOU), chaired by Juozas Paplauskas. The conference once again reiterated the call to overthrow Smetona's regime and to convene the second Constituent Assembly of Lithuania. Ideological differences continued to widen, and Plečkaitis, accused of spying for the Lithuanian security agencies, was removed from LSDOU in March 1929. Other conferences of LSDOU were organised in September 1929 in Vilnius and December 1930 at the office of the German newspaper Vorwärts in Berlin.

Plečkaitininkai published various brochures as well as periodicals Pirmyn (Forward in 1927–30 in Vilnius), Kova (Fight in 1930–32 in Berlin and 1934–35 in Paris), Darbininkų balsas (Voice of Workers in 1930–31 in Riga), and Darbo frontas (Labor Front in 1933–34 in Riga).

== Dissolution ==
The Lithuanian intelligence agencies monitored and counteracted plečkaitininkai activities. In the eyes of the Lithuanian public, it was easy to discredit the group by pointing out the support from Poland. In June 1929, the government adopted a special law which provided strict sentences, including the death penalty, to plečkaitininkai and their supporters while promising awards to those who helped capture them.

After the Nazi seizure of power in 1933 and the coup in Latvia in 1934, plečkaitininkai could no longer operate in Germany or Latvia. They also received less and less support from Poland. As a result, the organisation became inactive around 1935. In 1936–1938, Poland accused several members of plečkaitininkai of spying for Lithuania and arrested them. In May 1936, authorities arrested Paplauskas for a month. In March 1937, Paplauskas and thirteen others were arrested, and in May 1938, five received prison sentences of two to five years. Paplauskas was acquitted.
