= Darbininkų balsas =

Darbininkų balsas (transl. The Voice of Workers) was the name of several Lithuanian-language periodicals:

- Darbininkų balsas (40 issues in 1901–1906) published in Tilsit and Bitėnai by the Social Democratic Party of Lithuania
- Darbininkų balsas (1914–1919) published in Baltimore and Chicago by the Lithuanian section of the Industrial Workers of the World
- Darbininkų balsas (1920–1921) published weekly in Kharkiv by the Lithuanian section of the Central Committee of the Communist Party of Ukraine
- Darbininkių balsas (1923–1932) published monthly in Brooklyn by women workers as a replacement for Moterų balsas (1916–1923)
- Darbininkų balsas (6 issues in 1924–1926) published in Šiauliai by the Šiauliai Workers' Professional Organization
- Darbininkų balsas (20 issues in 1930–1931) published every two weeks in Riga by plečkaitininkai
- Darbininkų balsas (1931–1939) published weekly in Klaipėda by the Association of Workers, Artisans, and Small Landowners of the Klaipėda Region
- Darbininkų balsas (68 issues in 1956–1967) published monthly and later every two months in London by a group of former members of the Social Democratic Party of Lithuania
- Darbininkų balsas (1989–1995) published quarterly in Klaipėda by the Klaipėda Workers' Union
- Darbininkų balsas (1995–2021) published monthly in Klaipėda by the Klaipėda City and County Trade Union
