= Emilija Spudaitė-Gvildienė =

Lithuanian educator and politician

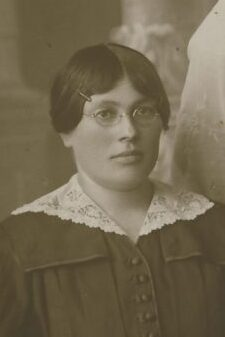

Member of the Seimas
- In office 1922–1927
- Constituency: Panevėžys

Member of the Constituent Assembly
- In office 1920–1922
- Constituency: Panevėžys

Personal details
- Born: 13 September 1887 Topeliškės, Russian Empire
- Died: 2 July 1965 (aged 77) Kaunas, Soviet Union

Emilija Spudaitė-Gvildienė (13 September 1887 – 2 July 1965) was a Lithuanian educator and politician. In 1920 she was one of five women elected to the Constituent Assembly, Lithuania's first female parliamentarians. She remained a member of parliament until 1927.

== Biography ==
Spudaitė-Gvildienė was born in Topeliškės in 1887 into the family of a small trader. She was educated at Riga City School until 1902 and then Riga Krotova Gymnasium, graduating in 1908. The following year she moved to Lithuania and began teaching at a school in Žemaičių Kalvarija. During World War I she temporarily relocated to Moscow from 1915 to 1917, teaching in the Moscow Lithuanian School. After returning to Lithuania in 1918 she taught at gymnasiums in Šeduva and Pakruojis and founded women's associations in both towns.

A member of the Lithuanian Christian Democratic Party, in 1920 she was elected to the Constituent Assembly from constituency V, Panevėžys. She was re-elected in 1922, 1923 and 1926, serving in the Seimas until it was dissolved following the 1926 coup.

After the Seimas was disbanded, she served as chair of the Lithuanian Catholic Women's Society. During the 1940s she taught in schools in Balbieriškis, Kalviai and Kaunas. She died in Kaunas in 1965.
