= Tauragė Revolt =

Attempted anti-government revolt in Lithuania

Date	9 September 1927
Location	Tauragė, Lithuania
Result	Revolt suppressed

Belligerents
Members of the Social Democratic Party of Lithuania, Lithuanian Popular Peasants' Union	Lithuanian government

Commanders and leaders
Povilas Mikulskis †; Jeronimas Plečkaitis	Chief of Security Police Jonas Budrys

Units involved
	7th Infantry Regiment

Strength
200	

Casualties and losses
2 killed, 4 injured, 324 arrested, 11 executed	None

The Tauragė Revolt (Lithuanian: Tauragės sukilimas) was an anti-government revolt that took place in Tauragė, Lithuania on 9 September 1927. Members of the Social Democratic Party of Lithuania and Lithuanian Popular Peasants' Union wanted to remove President Antanas Smetona from power. The rebels took control of Tauragė, the revolt spread to neighboring villages and their forces grew to 200 men. However, the revolt was poorly prepared and was suppressed the same day by units of the Lithuanian Army that arrived from Klaipėda. In the aftermath, over 300 people were arrested and 11 were executed. A group of rebels escaped abroad where they became known as plečkaitininkai and, with the help from Poland, continued to plot against Smetona's regime until the mid-1930s. It was one of 13 attempts to overthrow Smetona's regime in 1926–1938.

== Background ==
The revolt was the third attempt in less than a year to overthrow the government of President Antanas Smetona and Prime Minister Augustinas Voldemaras that was installed by the military coup d'état of December 1926. In January 1927, reserve major Juozas Tomkus, editor of Tautos valia, and reserve captain Pranas Klimaitis, former chairman of the Lithuanian Riflemen's Union, were arrested and sent to the newly established Varniai concentration camp when rumors spread that they planned a coup to install Vincas Grigaliūnas-Glovackis. In March, Juozas Pajaujis, member of the Third Seimas of Lithuania, attempted a coup to "defend the constitution". His subsequent arrest and parliamentary crisis became a pretext for Smetona to dissolve the Seimas. As a result of these attempts, several members of the opposition, primarily members of the Social Democratic Party of Lithuania and Lithuanian Popular Peasants' Union, were deported from Kaunas to the province where they continued to plot against the government.

== Revolt ==
The opposition was active in Tauragė but also in Alytus (leaders Juozas Paplauskas and Juozas Kedys), Vilkaviškis (Jeronimas Plečkaitis), Raseiniai, Kėdainiai. They collected weapons and printed proclamations in Tilsit, Germany, that claimed that the revolt would receive support from three regiments of the Lithuanian Army. Reportedly, the preparations started in June 1927. There were plans for a country-wide revolt, but they were rushed and never came to life. In their book XX amžiaus slaptieji archyvai (Secret Archives of the 20th Century) Gražina Sviderskytė and Arvydas Anušauskas argued that the revolt was in large part organized by the Security Police to discredit the opposition.

In the early morning of 9 September, about 30 armed men took over the police station and commandant's office and arrested the officers. They also took control of the post office, railway station, headquarters of the local chapter of the Lithuanian Riflemen's Union. Ieva Šaulinskienė, a telegrapher, was forced to work by the insurgents who lacked specialists, but she still sent a telegram to another city saying: "Revolt in Tauragė. Save us!" (Tauragėje sukilimas. Gelbėkite!).

There was very little resistance; during the single shootout two of the rebels were injured. In the local press, the rebels printed 5,000 copies of a proclamation, signed by reserve captain Antanas Majus as the new head of the Tauragė District, informing locals about the revolt and ordering to surrender all weapons to the new commandant. Ferdinandas Saltonas stole 200,000 litas and 3,000 dollars from the local branch of the Bank of Lithuania for the "purchase of weapons" though the bank had about 1.5 million litas. The revolt spread to neighboring villages of Pagramantis, Sartininkai, Žygaičiai and the rebels numbered some 200 men. However, it was clear that the rebels did not have further plans. Units from the 7th Infantry Regiment from Klaipėda and 8th Infantry Regiment from Šiauliai entered Tauragė by 5 p.m. and retook the town with little resistance: one rebel was killed and two were injured. The soldiers shot and killed Povilas Mikulskis, leader of the revolt and former member of the Seimas, when they tried to arrest him on 10 September.

The revolt in Alytus ended before it started. A group of 30–40 men, commanded by Jeronimas Plečkaitis, gathered near Balbieriškis and planned to attack military barracks hoping that the soldiers would join them. The group, armed with only a few revolvers, dispersed when they heard of searches being conducted in Alytus and saw military patrols.

== Aftermath ==
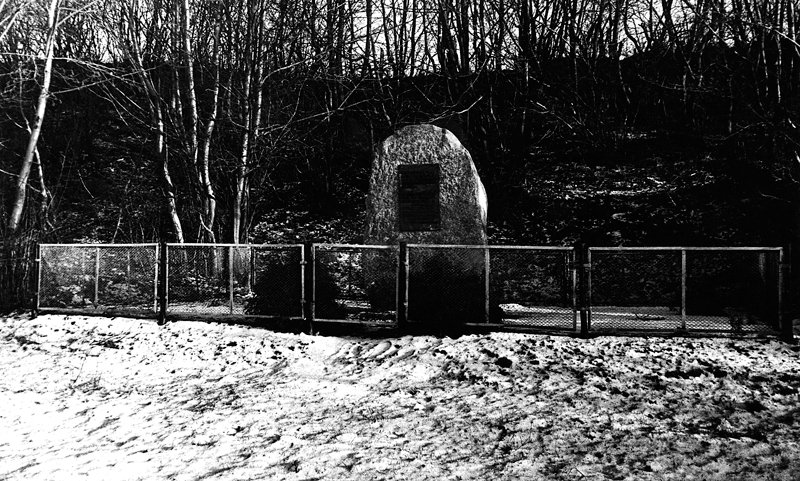
Memorial to the executed participants of the revolt in 1969

In total, 324 people were arrested and 209 put on trial. 22 people received death sentences and another 22 received life imprisonment. Several sentences were commuted and only 11 people were actually executed, seven of them a week after the revolt and the other four on 12 May 1929. In 1972, a memorial stone was erected on the shore of the Jūra river where the executed men were buried. Tauragė commandant also received an 8-month prison sentence for the failure to defend the town. Ferdinandas Saltonas was arrested attempting to cross the Latvia–Lithuania border, but was not prosecuted raising suspicions that the money he stole from the bank was meant as a compensation from the Security Police for his services in spying on the rebels. Antanas Majus was not present in Tauragė and later claimed that he knew nothing of the revolt. About 60 rebels, including leaders Jeronimas Plečkaitis, Juozas Paplauskas and Juozas Kedys, escaped abroad. They became known as plečkaitininkai and, with the help from Poland, continued to plot against the Smetona's regime until the mid-1930s. The government used the threat of this group as one of the arguments for suppressing free press and spying on leftist organizations. Therefore, in the long run, the revolt only strengthened Smetona's regime.
