= Lithuanian Free Market Institute =

Nonprofit organization in Vilnius, Lithuania

The Lithuanian Free Market Institute (Lithuanian: Lietuvos laisvosios rinkos institutas) or LFMI is a non-profit non-partisan organization (think tank) based in Vilnius, Lithuania. It was established by six economists, including Petras Auštrevičius, in November 1990.

Based on the ideas of the Austrian Economic School, its mission is to promote free market ideals with a focus on freedom, responsibility, and limited government intervention. The team of LFMI conducts research on the main economic and policy issues, develops reform packages, plans legislative proposals, advises and consults government institutions. LFMI also publishes economic literature, conducts surveys, and holds conferences and lectures.

In early 2008, the LFRI was recognized as one of the best public policy centers in Central Europe and the world, according to a two-year survey of 5,080 think tanks representing a wide range of opinions, operating in 169 countries by the Philadelphia USA-based Foreign Policy Research Institute.

The chair of the board is Elena Leontjeva, the co-founder of LFMI and President of LFMI from 1993 to 2001. In 2011, Žilvinas Šilėnas was appointed as the President and Edita Maslauskaitė as the Vice President. The LFMI is a member of think tank networks EPICENTER, Atlas Network and 4liberty.

== See also ==
- Liberalism in Lithuania
