= Antanas Purėnas =

Lithuanian chemist and politician (1881–1962)

Antanas Purėnas

Antanas Purėnas (16 February 1881 – 5 November 1962) was a prominent Lithuanian organic chemist and politician.

== Biography ==
Antanas was born in Tatkonys, Kupiškis, Lithuania (then Empire of Russia). After completing Liepaja gymnasium, he was studying in Tartu in 1902–1904 and in Saint Petersburg from which he graduated in 1912.

== Scientific career ==
He was rector of Vytautas Magnus University from 1940 to 1941, and again from 1944 to 1946. Since 1951 he had been the professor of Kaunas Polytechnic Institute.

== Politician career ==
Purėnas participated in revolution held in 1905–1907, therefore he was prosecuted by the police. In 1918 he joined LSDP, Lithuanian teachers union and teachers association "Naujoji mokykla". In 1920 he was a delegate of LSDP in Constituent Assembly of Lithuania, and chairman of the educational committee.
