= Jeronimas Plečkaitis =

Lithuanian politician

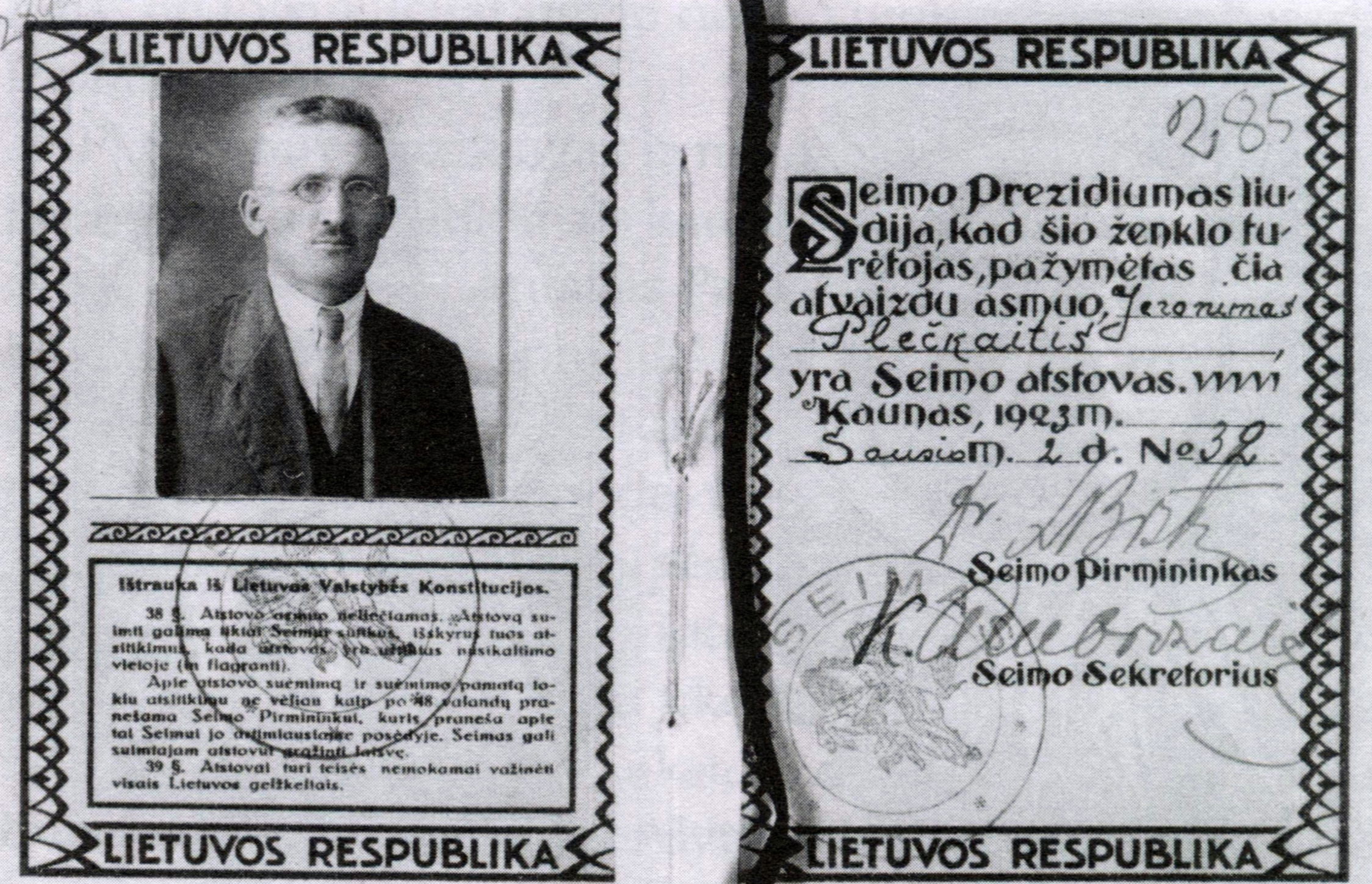
Member of the Seimas certificate of Plečkaitis (1923)

Jeronimas Plečkaitis (10 December 1887 in Keturvalakiai, Russian Empire – 29 October 1963 in Pilviškiai, Lithuanian SSR) was a Lithuanian politician. He was a member the national parliament, the Seimas, from 1920 to 1927, representing the Social Democratic Party of Lithuania. After the military coup d'état of December 1926, Plečkaitis became an active member of the opposition to President Antanas Smetona and Prime Minister Augustinas Voldemaras. He participated in the failed Tauragė Revolt in September 1927 and fled abroad to avoid arrest. He organized a group of men, known as plečkaitininkai, that received assistance from Poland and continued to plot against the Lithuanian government. He was arrested by the German police in September 1929 and sentenced to three years in prison. He was arrested again by Lithuania in 1940. In 1944, he was arrested by the Soviet authorities and sent to a Gulag camp in the Tyumen Oblast. He returned to Lithuania in 1955.

== Early life ==
Plečkaitis graduated from a two-year school in Vilkaviškis or Virbalis in 1902. He joined the Social Democratic Party of Lithuania during the Russian Revolution of 1905 and helped organizing worker strikes in the Suwałki Governorate. For that, he was arrested in July 1906 and imprisoned in Kalvarija until August 1909. In 1909–1910, he worked in Germany at the Hansa coal mine in Dortmund and as a construction worker. In 1910–1914, he served in the Imperial Russian Army, but managed to avoid being drafted to serve during World War I. Instead, he studied at teacher's courses in Marijampolė. Upon completion, he briefly worked as a teacher at a primary school in Vilkaviškis and Valavičiai. He organized workers into a trade union and served six weeks in Kaunas Prison for enticing a strike in 1918. He then escaped to Germany where he received help from German social democrats.

Plečkaitis returned to Lithuania in 1920 and was elected to the Constituent Assembly of Lithuania and was reelected to all subsequent Seimas. According to historian Vanda Daugirdaitė-Sruogienė, his speeches were long and unprepared, though fluent and persuasive. He was a member of various parliamentary commissions, including commission on agriculture and forestry and commission on complaints and petitions. In 1921–1927, he was a member of the central committee of the Social Democratic Party of Lithuania.

== Coup organizer ==
Military coup d'état of December 1926 installed the government of President Antanas Smetona and Prime Minister Augustinas Voldemaras. Left-wing members of the Seimas protested the coup and attempted to organize a counter-coup to "defend the constitution". When the police arrested Juozas Pajaujis, member of the Seimas, despite his diplomatic immunity, the Seimas presented an interpellation to the government but was dissolved by President Smetona. Thus members of the opposition, including Plečkaitis, left or were removed from Kaunas to the province where they continued to plot against the government and organize the failed Tauragė Revolt on 9 September 1927. Plečkaitis commanded a group of 30–40 men that gathered near Balbieriškis and planned to attack military barracks in Alytus hoping that the soldiers would join them. The group, armed with only a few revolvers, dispersed when they heard of searches being conducted in Alytus and saw military patrols.

Plečkaitis and other participants in the failed revolt escaped abroad to avoid arrests. Plečkaitis and Juozas Paplauskas organized the men and were approached by a member of the Polish Socialist Party who introduced them to Tadeusz Hołówko, director of the Eastern Division in the Political Department of the Polish Ministry of Foreign Affairs. Hołówko gave them $4,000 U.S. dollars (equivalent to $72,406 in 2024) and encouraged to organize a congress in Riga. At the time, Lithuania–Poland relations entered a particularly hostile phase over the bitter territorial dispute in the Vilnius (Wilno) Region. Therefore, Poland found it advantageous to support the group. The group became known as plečkaitininkai and organized an armed platoon in Hrodna. However, due to decreasing support from Poland and growing ideological disagreements between Plečkaitis and Paplauskas, the group splintered. Plečkaitis wanted to organize a coup to overthrow Smetona's regime, but his efforts in 1928 were blocked by the Lithuanian intelligence. In March 1928, he was removed from the Organization of Lithuanian Social Democrats Abroad (Lithuanian: Lietuvos socialdemokratų organizacija užsienyje or LSDOU), the political organization of plečkaitininkai.

== Arrests ==
Plečkaitis and five others were arrested by the German police in September 1929 when they attempted to cross the Germany–Poland border. They were armed with seven bombs, four grenades, two shotguns, and six revolvers. Lithuanian news agency ELTA claimed that the group was planning to bomb a train that Prime Minister Augustinas Voldemaras took from Geneva. In February 1930, Plečkaitis received a three-year prison sentence for illegal border crossing and possession of weapons. He was released from prison in 1932.

Plečkaitis largely faded from public life. He was arrested again in March 1940 by Lithuania when it gained control of Vilnius Region as a result of the Soviet–Lithuanian Mutual Assistance Treaty in October 1939. He was released at the start of the German invasion of the Soviet Union in June 1941. During the war, he worked as a translator at the Vilnius city municipality. In 1944, he was arrested by the Soviet authorities and sent to a Gulag camp in the Tyumen Oblast. He returned to Lithuania in 1955.
