= Kalviai (Varėna) =

- Village
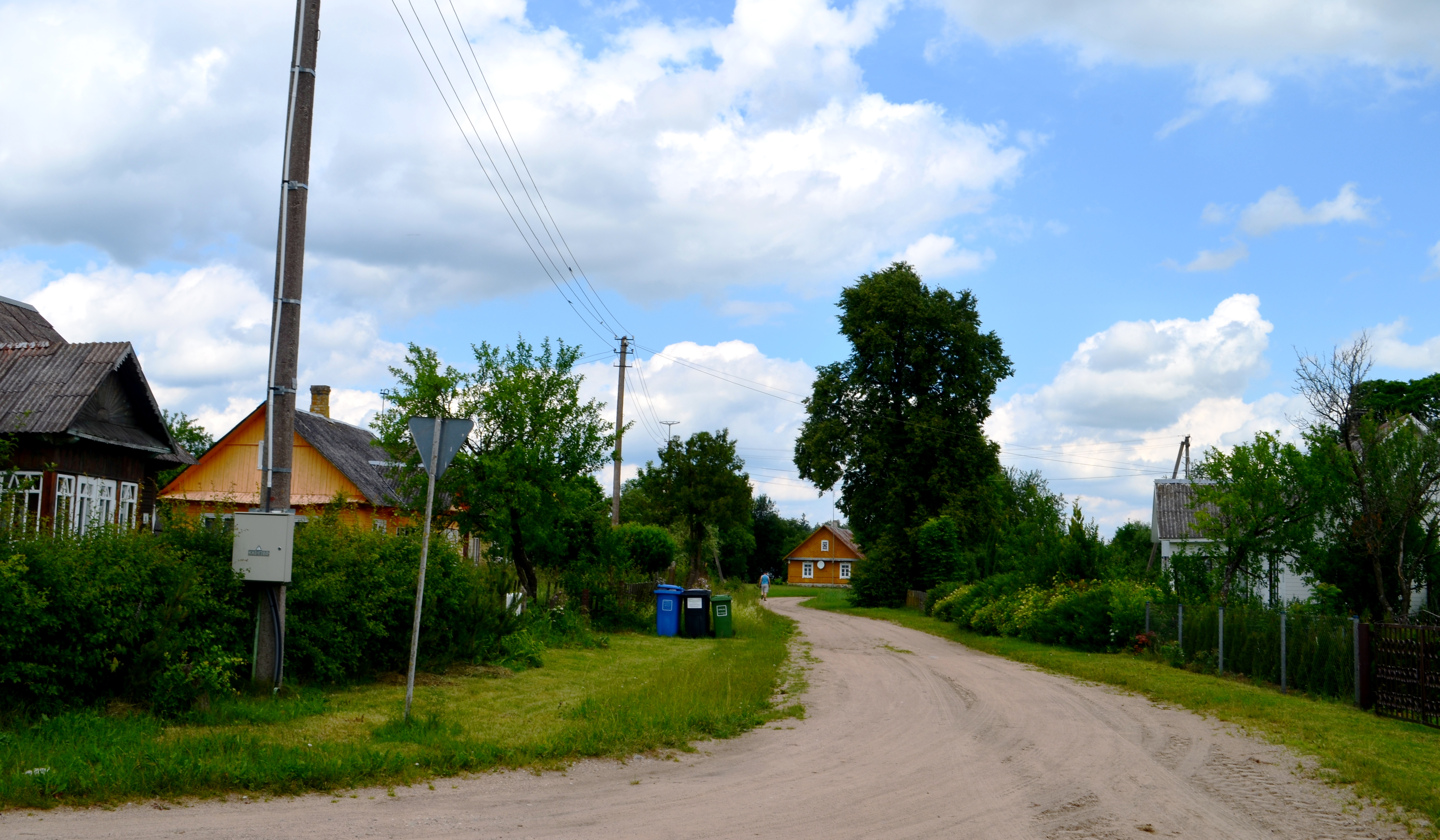
- Interactive map of Kalviai
- Location in Varėna district municipality Kalviai (Lithuania)
- Coordinates: 54°01′59″N 24°49′30″E
- Country: Lithuania
- County: Alytus County
- Municipality: Varėna
- Eldership: Kaniavos (Kaniava)

Population (2021)
  - Total: 35
- Time zone: UTC+2 (EET)
  - Summer (DST): UTC+3 (EEST)

Kalviai is a village in Kaniavos eldership, Varėna district municipality, Alytus County, southeastern Lithuania. According to the 2001 census, the village has a population of 68 people. At the 2011 census, the population was 47.

== Etymology ==
It is unclear if Lithuanian name Kalviai or Slavic name Kowalki originated first, but both respectably mean 'smiths' (from Lithuanian: kalvis and Belarusian: коваль 'a smith').
