= Maksas Soloveičikas =

Lithuanian politician

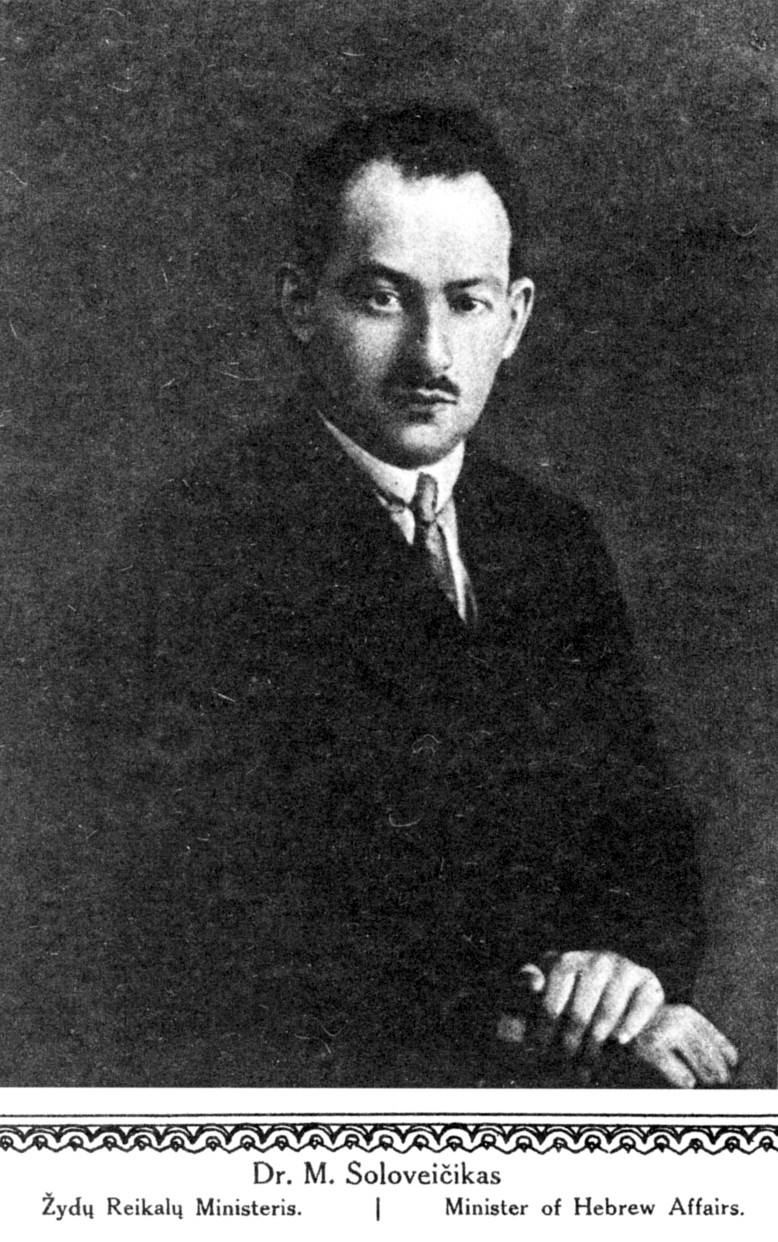
Maksas Soloveičikas

Maksas Soloveičikas (19 November 1883 in Kaunas – 1957 in Tel Aviv), usually written in English-language sources Max Soloveichik, was a Lithuanian-Jewish Zionist activist, journalist, and a politician.

== Biography ==
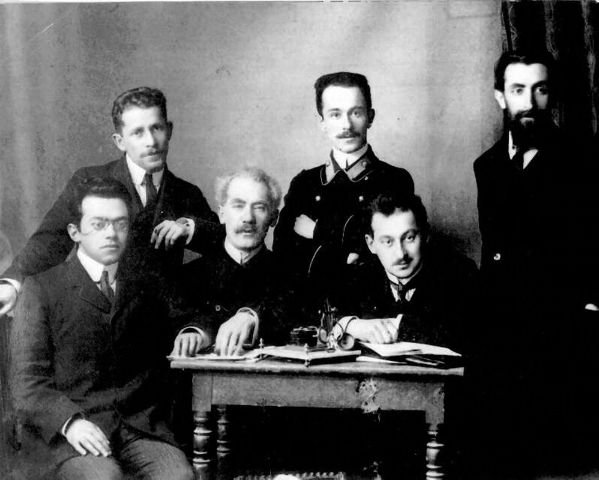
Editorial staff of Razsvet in Saint Petersburg, 1912. Sitting (R-L): 1) Max (Mordecai) Soloveichik (Solieli), 2) Avraham Ben David Idelson, 3) Zeev Jabotinsky; Standing: 1) Arnold Zeidman, 2) Alexander Goldstein, 3) Shlomo Gefstein.

After graduating from high school in Kaunas, he studied in St. Petersburg and Germany. At the University of Geneva he obtained the title of doctor of philosophy. He traveled throughout the Middle East and the Holy Land, and later moved to Saint Petersburg, where he became involved in Zionist activity and scientific work, among others with "History of the Jewish people." He worked as an editor in the newspapers Yevreyskaya zhizn (Jewish Life) and Rassvet (Dawn).

During World War I, he briefly lived in Germany, but in 1915, he was in Moscow. After returning to Lithuania, he ran for the city council in Kaunas and was elected a member of the city government.

In the governments of Mykolas Sleževičius, Ernestas Galvanauskas and Kazys Grinius, he held the office of Minister of Jewish Affairs (from April 1919 to December 1922). In 1919, he took part in the Paris Peace Conference as a representative of the Lithuanian Jews.

In April 1920, he was elected to the Constituent Assembly of Lithuania. In April 1922, he resigned as Minister in protest against the lack of legitimacy for the ministry. He continued his role de facto until end of the year, when he started working at the Executive Office of the World Zionist Organization. From 1923, he lived in Berlin. After the rise of Hitler, he went to Mandatory Palestine, where he worked at a bank in Tel Aviv until 1941.
