= Konradas Aleksa =

Lithuanian veterinarian, agronomist, sociologist, archeologist and zoologist

Konradas Juozas Aleksa (19 February 1881 – 6 November 1956) was a Lithuanian veterinarian, agronomist, sociologist, archeologist, and zoologist. He is best known as a professor at Vytautas Magnus University Agriculture Academy and one of the creators of the Lithuanian University of Health Sciences Veterinary Academy. Aleksa introduced veterinary medicine to Lithuania and was Lithuania's first proponent of eugenics.

== Biography ==
=== Early life ===
Konradas Juozas Aleksa was born on 19 February 1881 in the village of Obelupiai in Congress Poland of the Russian Empire. His brothers were Zigmas Angarietis (later a Communist revolutionary) and Jonas Pranas Aleksa (an agronomist). Aleksa collected Lithuanian folklore and folk songs in his youth, which would be lost during World War I. In 1899, Aleksa graduated from Marijampolė Gymnasium, and then traveled to Warsaw to study at the Warsaw Institute of Veterinary Medicine. On 1 May 1901, he participated in an anti-Tsarist demonstration in Warsaw, where he was injured and arrested. In 1903, he graduated from the Warsaw Institute of Veterinary Medicine, where he continued working. He also practiced veterinary medicine at Šakiai, Kalvarija, and Balaklava. Until the beginning of the First World War, he collected scientific knowledge and wrote in the press.

=== Conscription in Russian armies ===
Aleksa joined the Russian Imperial Army and fought in the Russo-Japanese War from 1904 to 1905. As a person with a medical background, Aleksa served as a medic during the First World War. Aleksa was elected as a regimental delegate to the Russian Army Congress to represent non-Russian people, i.e. people from the occupied territories. Aleksa was elected senior veterinarian in the city of Daugavpils (Dvinsk), but his regiment soon deserted the Russian army, which at that time was in complete disarray. Aleksa traveled back to famine-ridden Balaklava, where his family lived at the time. Aleksa later got a job as a clerk in the city municipality's office to financially provide for his exhausted family and recover. Aleksa was soon mobilized into Lieutenant General Anton Denikin's army, being discharged only when he fell seriously ill. After recovering, he worked in the Balaklava city cooperative. However, Aleksa was then mobilized for a second time under General Pyotr Wrangel. After Wrangel's forces ultimately lost against the Bolshevik forces, Aleksa became a prisoner of war.

In 1920, he was imprisoned by the new Russian government and tried by the NKVD troika. It is said that Aleksas's defense speech in court saved his life; Aleksa claimed that representatives of peoples enslaved by the Russian Tsar could not be volunteers in the White Army, and so consequently Aleksa ended up in it against his will. After Aleksa's speech, him and one Latvian were acquitted, while the others were shot. In 1922, he got a job in Kharkov at the Lithuanian embassy. After he formed an echelon of Lithuanian war exiles in Crimea, he arrived in Lithuania in the summer of 1922. He and his wife Marija Aleksienė née Kožanevska adopted two children.

=== Professor in Lithuania ===
From 1922 to 1924, Aleksa lectured at the Dotnuva School of Agriculture, and at Vytautas Magnus University Agriculture Academy from 1924 to 1938. From 1926 to 1927 and from 1928 to 1936, he was a prorector. In 1923, Aleksa became one of the creators of the Lithuanian Veterinary Doctor Academy, being its chairman for a few years. From 1932 to 1938, Aleksa was a permanent representative of Lithuania at the Office International des Epizooties in Paris. Aleksa was made professor in 1927. In 1928, he was awarded the Order of the Grand Duke Gediminas, 3rd degree. Aleksa was the first to do sociological research on women living in urban villages, publishing the book Lietuvos moteris sodietė in 1932 with his own funds, distributing copies for free.

In 1930, he opened a new Household Section in the Agriculture Academy, where female household agronomists were trained. Aleksa was one of the main creators of the Lithuanian University of Health Sciences Veterinary Academy, being its lecturer from 1938 to 1940. Aleksa was a co-author of a book on veterinary medicine published in 1936 in Toulouse. Aleksa was the first to write on the history of veterinary medicine in Lithuania and to do research on coprology. Aleksa was also one of the first to create Lithuanian names for veterinary terms and to study zoopsychology. As an archeologist, Aleksa was the first to study horse skeletons in mass graves in Lithuania. Aleksa contributed to numerous publications such as Karys, Gamta, Lietuvos žinios, and Naujoji Romuva. From 1931 to 1944, he wrote articles for the Lietuviškoji enciklopedija (Lithuanian Encyclopedia), the first Lithuanian encyclopedia.

=== Later years ===
During the Nazi occupation of Lithuania, Aleksa declined a more career-prospective position, which in turn would please the local Nazi government, and as such was prohibited from living and working in Kaunas. From 1941 to 1944, he was the head of the Vilnius District's veterinary hospital. He was also the head of the Department of Special Zootechnics, being made an honorary doctor in 1941, and its prorector from 1944 until 1946. From 1944 to 1956, Aleksa again was made lecturer of the Veterinary Academy. Aleksa wrote for the underground Lithuanian press, and during Soviet occupation, he secretly lectured students on genetics, which was prohibited at the time. For his illegal lectures, private property, and recognition of Western scientists, Aleksa was regularly criticized and persecuted by the Soviet government.

He died on 6 November 1956. He was buried in the Eiguliai Cemetery in Kaunas.
