= Ona Muraškaitė-Račiukaitienė =

Lithuanian educator and politician

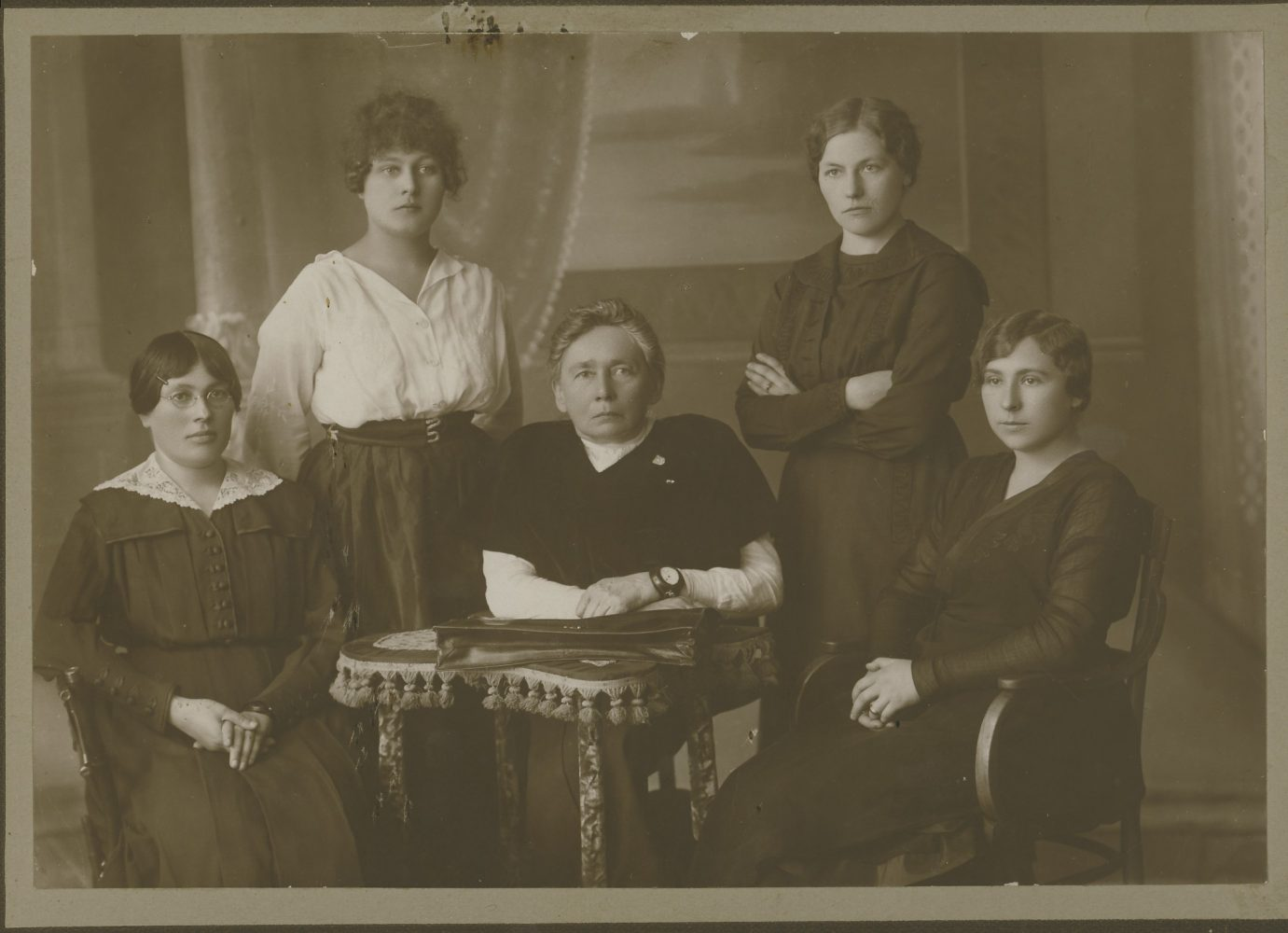

Member of the Constituent Assembly
- In office 1920–1922
- Constituency: Marijampolė

Personal details
- Born: 15 February 1896 Dobilaičiai, Russian Empire
- Died: 1985 (aged 88-89) Kaunas, Lithuania

Ona Muraškaitė-Račiukaitienė (15 February 1896 – 1985) was a Lithuanian educator and politician. In 1920 she was one of five women elected to the Constituent Assembly, Lithuania's first female parliamentarians. She remained a member of parliament until 1922.

== Biography ==
Muraškaitė-Račiukaitienė was born in Dobilaičiai in 1896. She was educated at a German primary school in Kybartai and attended the Žiburio gymnasium in Marijampolė between 1912 and 1914. She subsequently taught at a secret school in Ošiškės, running evening courses that had been banned by the government. In 1915 she moved to Vilnius and later relocated to Voronezh, where she attended the Martynas Yčas Gymnasium, graduating in 1918. She also taught Lithuanian history at the Voronezh People's University from 1917 to 1918.

She returned to Lithuania in 1918, teaching Lithuanian and history at her old school in Marijampolė. A member of the Lithuanian Christian Democratic Party, in 1920 she was elected to the Constituent Assembly from constituency I, Marijampolė. She was not re-elected in 1922, after which she studied in the faculties of humanities and law at the University of Lithuania.

She died in Kaunas, in 1985.
