= Democratic Jewish Union =

Democratic Jewish Union Žydų demokratinis susivienijimas
- Ideology: Jewish interests

The Democratic Jewish Union (Lithuanian: Žydų demokratinis susivienijimas, ŽDS) was a political coalition in inter-war Lithuania.

== History ==
The ZDS contested the Constituent Assembly elections in Lithuania in 1920, receiving 6.6% of the vote and winning six seats. The six elected members were Simon Rosenbaum (Zionist), Max Soloveitzik (Zionist), Dr. Nachman Rachmilewitz (Achdut-Agudat Israel), R. Abraham Popelas (Achdut-Agudat Israel), Nachman Fridman (Folkspartei) and Ozer Finkelstein (Folkspartei). After Fridman's death he was replaced in the assembly by Samuel Landau.

The party did not contest the 1922 or 1923 elections, but returned in 1926 as a merger of the Zionist faction and the Folkspartei, when it won three seats. However, a military coup saw the Seimas dissolved in December 1926 and no further multi-party elections were held again until the 1990.
