= Peasant Union =

The Peasant Union (Lithuanian: Valstiečių sąjunga, VS) was a political party in Lithuania.

== History ==
The party was formed by younger members of the Lithuanian Democratic Party following the Revolution of 1905. When the LDP was finally dissolved in 1920, its remaining members joined the Peasant Union or the Lithuanian Popular Socialist Democratic Party (LSLDP), a 1917 breakaway. In the 1920 elections the party won 19 seats, becoming the third largest party in the First Seimas. It formed a government alongside the Christian Democratic Bloc, an alliance of the Lithuanian Christian Democratic Party, the Labour Federation and the Farmers' Association.

The 1922 elections saw the party win 14 seats, finishing second to the Lithuanian Christian Democratic Party. Shortly after the 1922 elections, on 24 November, the VS merged with the LSLDP to form the Lithuanian Popular Peasants' Union.

== Election results ==
=== Seimas ===
Election	Leader	Votes	%	Seats	+/–	Government
1920	Unclear	116,298	17.05 (#2)	20 / 112	New	Opposition
1922	Kazys Grinius	136,713	16.84 (#2)	14 / 78	▼5	Opposition
1923	Merged with Lithuanian Popular Socialist Democratic Party into Lithuanian Popular Peasants' Union					
