= Lithuanian Popular Socialist Democratic Party =

Lithuanian Popular Socialist Democratic Party (Lithuanian: Lietuvos socialistų liaudininkų demokratų partija, LSLDP) was a political party in inter-war Lithuania.

== History ==
The LSLDP was formed in 1917 in Voronezh by Mykolas Sleževičius and Felicija Bortkevičienė as a conservative breakaway from the Lithuanian Democratic Party (LDP). When the LDP was dissolved in 1920, its remaining members joined the LSLDP or the Peasant Union, another former breakaway.

In the 1920 elections the LSLDP won 9 seats, emerging as the sixth-largest party in the Seimas. However, the 1922 elections saw the party won only five seats. Shortly after the 1922 elections, on 24 November, the party merged with the Peasant Union to form the Lithuanian Popular Peasants' Union.

== Election results ==
=== Seimas ===
Election	Leader	Votes	%	Seats	+/–	Government
1920	Unclear	39,264	5.75 (#6)	9 / 112	New	Opposition
1922	Unclear	8,506	1.05 (#16)	5 / 78	▼4	Opposition
1923	Merged with Peasant Union into Lithuanian Popular Peasants' Union					
