= Lithuanian Popular Peasants' Union =

Lithuanian Popular Peasants' Union Lietuvos valstiečių liaudininkų sąjunga
- Abbreviation: LVLS
- Founded: 1922
- Banned: 1936
- Merger of: Lithuanian Popular Socialist Democratic Party; Peasant Union
- Ideology: Agrarianism
- Political position: Centre-left
- International affiliation: Radical International

The Lithuanian Popular Peasants' Union (Lithuanian: Lietuvos valstiečių liaudininkų sąjunga, LVLS) was a centre-left political party in Lithuania between 1922 and 1936. The party's leaders included the third President Kazys Grinius and three-term Prime Minister Mykolas Sleževičius.

== History ==
The party was established in November 1922 by a merger of the Lithuanian Popular Socialist Democratic Party and the Peasant Union. At the time the two parties held a combined 19 seats, making it the largest in the Seimas. The new party emerged as the largest faction in the 1923 elections, winning 16 of the 78 seats. The 1926 elections saw the party increase its seat tally to 22, remaining the largest party in the Seimas. From the 1920s, party internationally participated in the International Entente of Radical and Similar Democratic Parties.

The LVLS formed a coalition government with the Social Democratic Party, but it was overthrown by a military coup in December 1926 which installed the Lithuanian Nationalist Union as the ruling party. The LVLS was banned in 1936.

== Election results ==
=== Seimas ===
Election	Leader	Votes	%	Seats	+/–	Government
1920	Lithuanian Popular Socialist Democratic Party and Peasant Union					
1922	Lithuanian Popular Socialist Democratic Party and Peasant Union					
1923	Kazys Grinius	161,195	17.88 (#1)	16 / 78	New	Opposition
1926	Kazys Grinius	225,797	22.20 (#1)	22 / 85	▲6	Coalition
1936	Banned					
