= Constituent Assembly of Lithuania =

1920–22 legislature of Lithuania

Constituent Assembly of Lithuania Steigiamasis Seimas
- Lithuania

Type
- Type: Constituent assembly

History
- Established: 1920
- Disbanded: 1922
- Succeeded by: Seimas: First Seimas
- Seats: 150

Elections
- Voting system: Direct multi-party elections
- Last election: 1920

The Constituent Assembly of Lithuania or Constituent Seimas (Lithuanian: Steigiamasis Seimas) was the first parliament of the independent state of Lithuania to be elected in a direct, democratic, general, secret election. The Assembly assumed its duties on 15 May 1920 and was disbanded in October 1922.

== Legal grounds ==
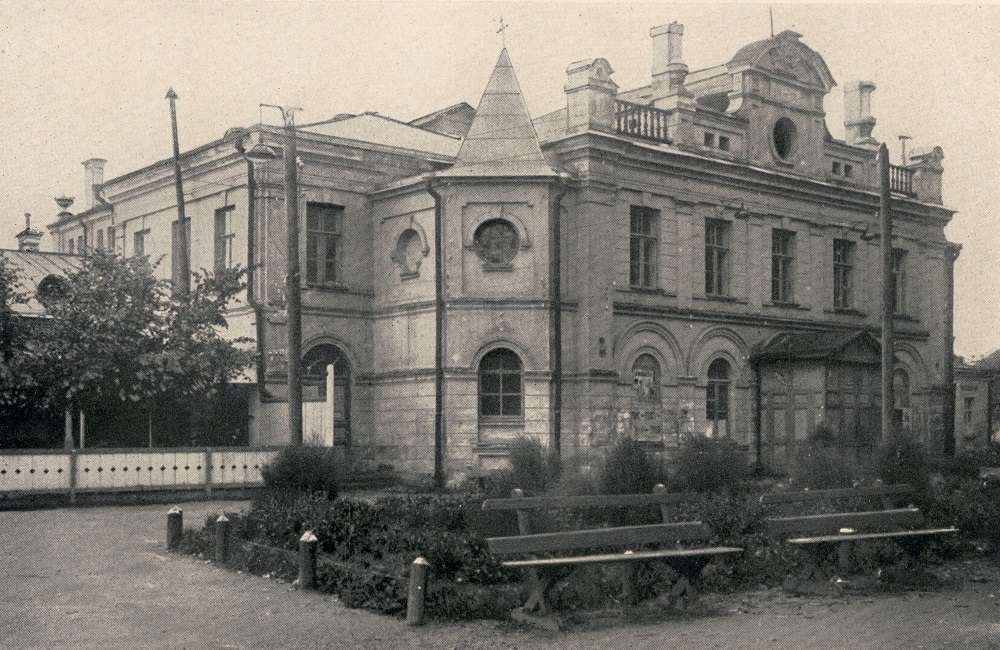
The Kaunas City Theatre where on 15 May 1920 the first session of the Constituent Assembly of Lithuania was held (pictured before the World War I)

Following the last Partition of the Polish-Lithuanian Commonwealth in 1795, Lithuania was annexed by and became part of the Russian Empire.

On 21 September 1917, Vilnius played host to the Lithuanian Conference which resolved that, to lay the groundwork for the independent Lithuania and regulate its relations with the neighbours, a Constituent Assembly, elected under the principles of democracy by all of its residents, had to be convened in Vilnius. The resolutions of the Conference were to be implemented by an executive body: the Lithuanian Council of 20 members (to become the Council of the State of Lithuania as of 11 July 1918). It was this Council that adopted the Act of Independence on 16 February 1918, stipulating that a Constituent Assembly was to be convened as soon as possible. On 2 November 1918, the Council of the State of Lithuania passed the Fundamental Laws of the Provisional Constitution of the State of Lithuania, which said that the future form of the state of Lithuania would be determined by the Constituent Assembly. The Law on the Election of the Constituent Assembly was adopted on 30 October 1919.

== Elections ==
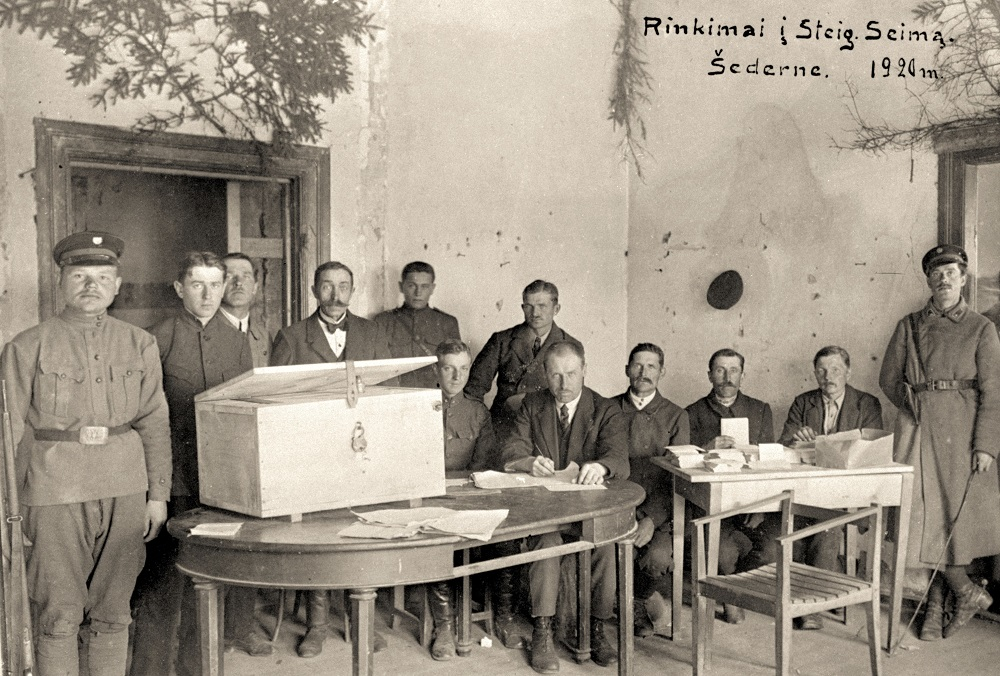
Members of one of the electoral commissions (out of 509) counting the votes of the voters

Lithuania was divided into 11 constituencies, of which 5 were not controlled by Lithuanians at the time. The total designated number of mandates was 229, but the Polish-controlled Vilnius region and the French-controlled Klaipėda region were barred from the elections. The constituencies under Lithuania's control were able to elect 112 representatives, one per population of 15,000. Every citizen aged 21 and above was entitled to vote; the voting age threshold for the military was 17. The paragraph in the Provisional Constitution stating that the Constituent Assembly would gather in Vilnius was amended. The rights and duties of the parties and fines and punishment for the obstruction of the elections, agitation by state officials during work hours, destruction of visual ads and electoral lists, the exercise of coercion or bribery towards voters, agitation out of place and time. The elections took place on 14–15 April 1920. The voter turnout reached about 90%. The voters, both men and women, elected 112 representatives.

== Representatives ==
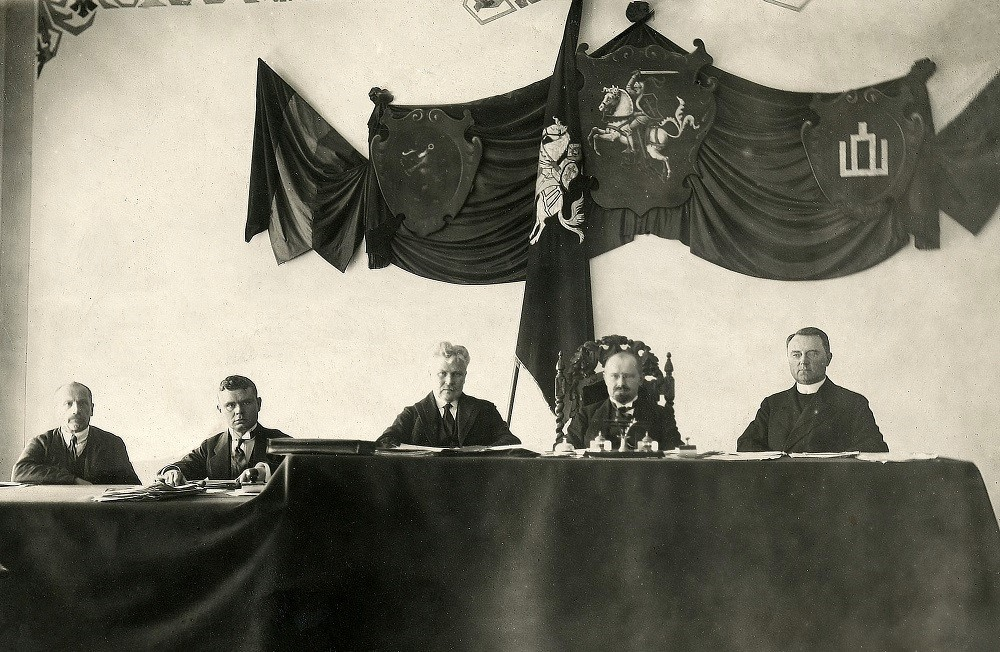
Presidium of the Constituent Assembly of Lithuania in the Seimas Meeting Hall in Kaunas in 1920

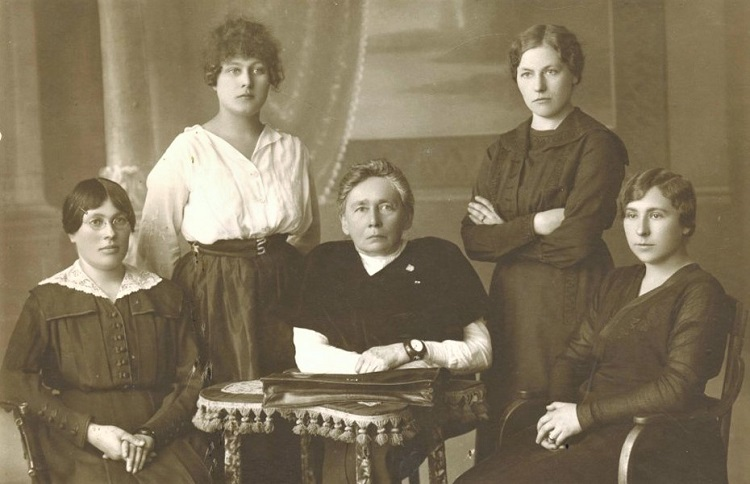
Women members of the Constituent Assembly of Lithuania in 1920

The plurality of the votes went to the lists of the Lithuanian Christian Democratic Party, securing it 59 seats. The bloc of the Lithuanian Popular Socialist Democratic Party and the Lithuanian Peasants’ Union placed second with 28 mandates. The Social Democratic Party of Lithuania won 13 seats. Ethnic parties won ten seats (six to Democratic Jewish Union, three to the Central Polish Electoral Committee and one to the Lithuanian German Committee). There were two non-partisan representatives. Later on, the parliamentary structure would shift. By way of rotation, some representatives would step down to be replaced by new ones. As a result, 150 persons had held a seat at the parliament by the end of the term.

Most representatives were very young: 26 of them were aged 30 or under, and only two 12 members of the parliament were 50 or older. Of them, 4 were members of the Jewish faction. The majority of the members of the parliament (37 out of 150) had a college degree, with the group of self-taught representatives coming in second (26 out of 150). Seven representatives were graduates of a spiritual academy or a divinity school.

The parliament had 8 female representatives. By way of seniority, MP Gabrielė Petkevičaitė–Bitė chaired the solemn inaugural meeting, with Ona Muraškaitė–Račiukaitienė, being the youngest member of the parliament, acting as secretary. It was a major achievement for women at the time.

In terms of trade, most members of the parliament were farmers (21). They were followed by teachers (18), officials, co-operators, and municipal workers (18), craftsmen and workmen (17), lawyers (13), priests and rabbis (12), military officers (13).

== Accomplishments ==
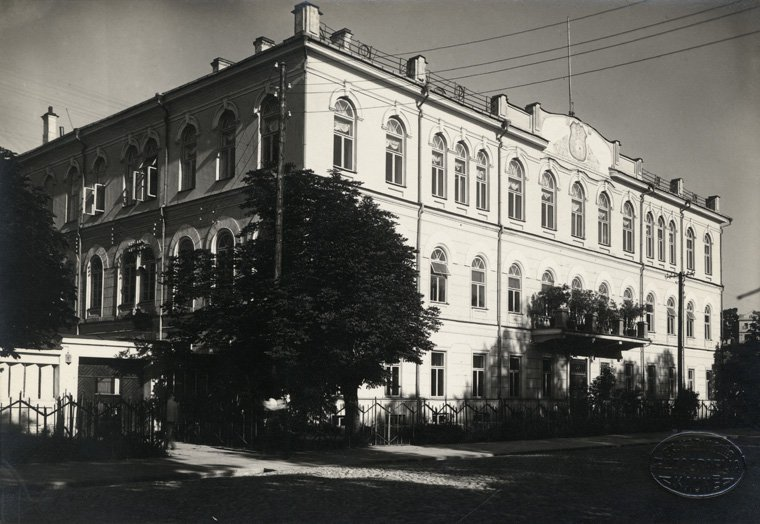
The Constituent Assembly Palace, now Kaunas Maironis' University Gymnasium

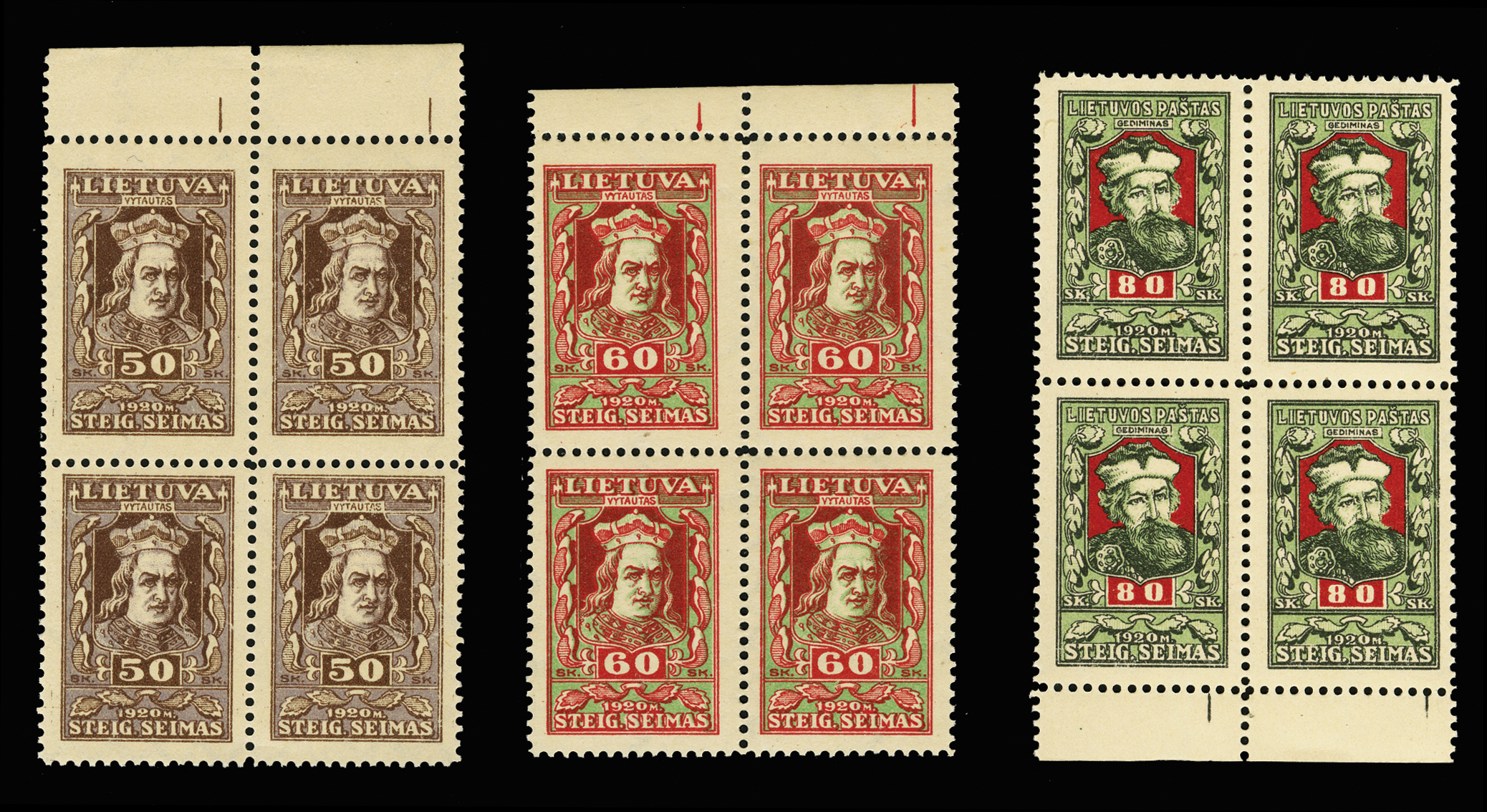
Lithuanian postage stamps with Vytautas the Great and Gediminas (Constituent Assembly of Lithuania Special Issue), issued in 1920

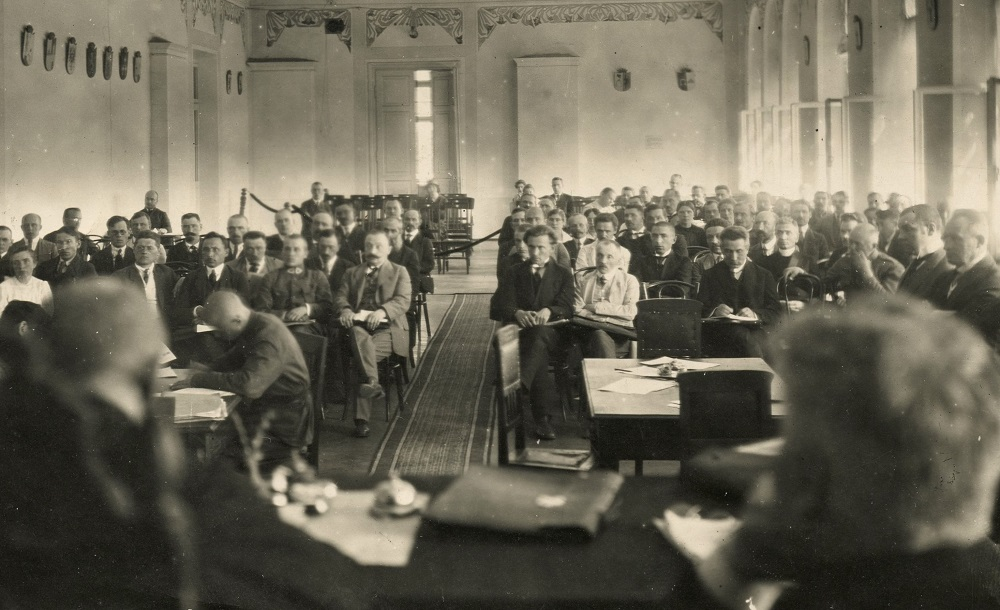
Session of the Constituent Assembly of Lithuania in the Seimas Palace in Kaunas in 1921

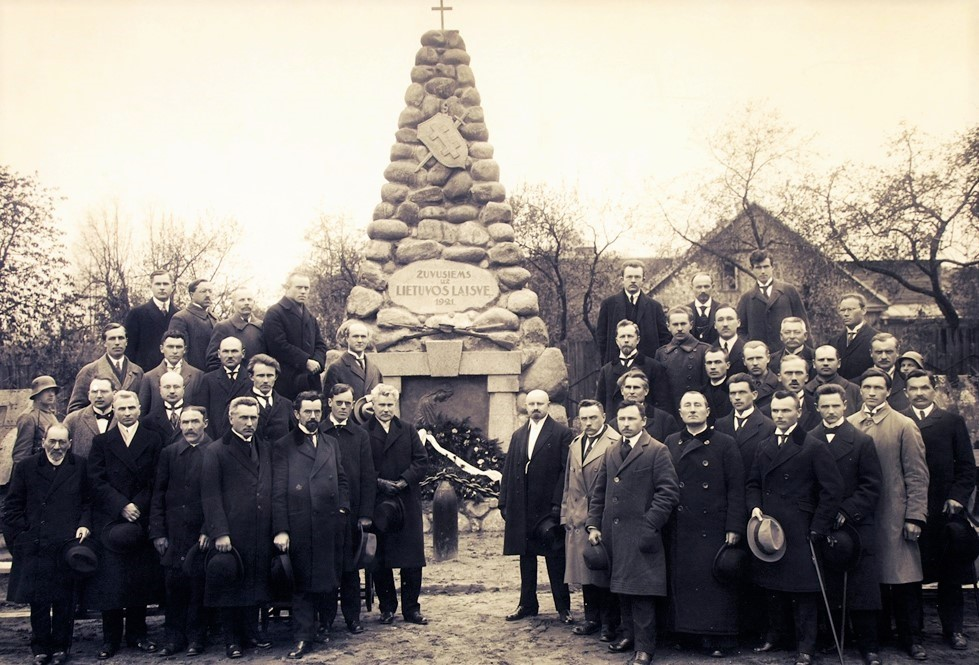
Members of the Constituent Assembly of Lithuania near a monument dedicated to those who fallen during the Lithuanian Wars of Independence (Kaunas, 1922)

The first meeting took place on 15 May 1920 in Kaunas, the temporary capital. Aleksandras Stulginskis was elected as the chairman and de facto president. As soon as 10 June 1920, it passed the third and final draft of the constitution.

On 12 June 1920, a peace treaty was signed with the Russian SFSR. It was highly beneficial to Lithuania as Russia recognized its independence de jure (the first state to do so after 1918) and acknowledged that vast areas of the Vilnius region belonged to Lithuania. Shortly after the defeat in the Battle of Warsaw, the withdrawing Red Army handed Vilnius over to Lithuania, in accordance with the agreement.

From October 1920 till February 1921, the Constituent Assembly was adjourned because the Lithuanian-Belarusian Division of the Polish Army under General Lucjan Żeligowski seized Vilnius. Many representatives went to the front to defend the historic capital. Before adjourning it had created the so-called Small Seimas (Lithuanian: Mažasis Seimas) consisting of the Chairman and six members of the regular Constituent Assembly who were authorized to pass urgent laws.

In March 1921, after international arbitration, a border treaty with Latvia was signed. 21 km of coastline including the towns of Palanga and Šventoji were transferred to Lithuania. It also defended its interest in the city of Mažeikiai. In return, Latvia received the so-called Aknysta foreland (Latvian: Aknīste) north of Rokiškis. In total, Latvia gained about 100 km² more than Lithuania. This treaty solved all border conflicts with Latvia and the border remains the same today. It became a foundation for good and healthy cooperation between the two nations.

On 23 September 1921, Lithuania became a member of the League of Nations. Most of the world's countries immediately recognized its independence.

On 15 February 1922, it passed a law on land reform. It was a decade-long reform which nationalized land owned by the nobility and distributed it to the volunteers who fought in the Freedom Wars and to peasants who owned none or very little land. This way Lithuania's agriculture was based on small (20-50 ha) farms. Over the years 459,000 ha of land were distributed to over 65,000 people. The nobility was allowed to keep 80 ha of land and was reimbursed an average of 27 litas per hectare (equivalent to $2.70 USD under the exchange rate in 1922) for nationalized land. People who received land, except for the volunteers, were required to pay for the land for 36 years.

The main goal, to adopt a new constitution, was reached on 1 August 1922. The constitution granted broad powers to the Seimas, the Parliament. It selected the Cabinet of Ministers and elected the President. The Seimas and the president were to be elected every three years in democratic elections. Lithuania was declared a democratic republic modeled after the example of France. Because of the Christian democrats' majority, the constitution clearly reflected Christian ideas. For example, it established that religious education is mandatory and its preamble starts with the words "In the name of Almighty God" (Lithuanian: Vardan Dievo Visagalio).

On 9 September a law was passed on the national currency, introducing the litas. On 1 October, it was introduced. Litas became one of the stronger currencies in Europe.

On 16 February 1922, the Lithuanian University was established and had its statute approved on the initiative of V. Čepinskis a month later.

On 6 October 1922, the Constituent Assembly resigned. A new regular Seimas started on 13 November. The assembly passed approximately 150 laws, strengthened the state's administrative system, and laid the foundations of the future economic, social and cultural life in Lithuania.

The Constituent Assembly continued to work for 29 months, held 257 plenary sessions and 963-panel sittings, and passed over 300 laws. Its main achievement was the first permanent Constitution of the Republic of Lithuania, which was adopted on 1 August 1922 to close the cycle of the prior provisional constitutions:

- The 1st Provisional Constitution (2 November 1918)
- The 2nd Provisional Constitution (4 April 1919)
- The 3rd Provisional Constitution (10 June 1920)

== Speakers of the Constituent Assembly of Lithuania ==
- Gabriele Petkevicaite-Bite (chaired the first sitting of the Constituent Assembly) 15 May 1920
- Aleksandras Stulginskis, 1920-1922.

== The importance of the Constituent Assembly ==
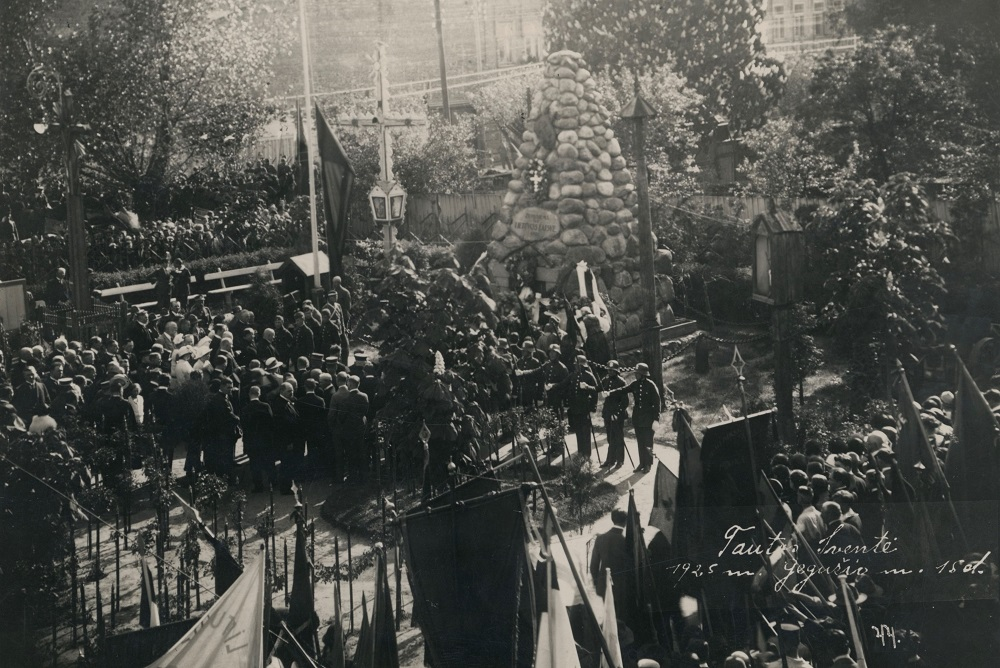
Festivities of the commemoration of the gathering of the Constituent Assembly of Lithuania (Kaunas, 1925)

The Assembly cemented the principles of western democracy grounded on the freedom of faith, consciousness, speech, the equality of nations and genders before the law, and the immunity of a person. The expiry of the Constituent Assembly's term marked the end of the national rebirth in Lithuania, the restoration of the state, resulting in the building of a legal foundation for the independent state. In addition to the fundamental laws (the standing Constitution, the land reform, the introduction of the Litas, and the establishment of the university), other areas of life were regulated as well. The country switched to a metric system, Central European time, implemented executive control, and became an active player on the international stage. During the term of the Constituent Assembly, Lithuania received de jure recognition from 16 states.

== See also ==
- Sejm of Central Lithuania
