= Avuta =

Location
- Country: Belarus
- Region: Vitebsk Region

Physical characteristics
- Source
  - location: Myory District
- Mouth: Dysna
  - coordinates: 55°32′36″N 28°11′26″E
- Length: 47 km (29 mi)
- Basin size: 461 km^{2} (178 sq mi)
- Discharge
  - average: 3.6 m^{3}/s (130 cu ft/s)

Basin features
- Progression: Dysna→ Daugava→ Baltic Sea

The Avuta (Belarusian: Авута Avuta; Russian: Аута Auta) is a river that flows through Belarus into the Dysna near the village of Bychinshchina.

The river flows from Lake Povvuto on the outskirts of the Sventsyan ridges, then flows along the Polotsk Lowland. The main tributaries: Nekhrist and Istyanka (right), Ulinets (left). It flows into the Dysna 3 km south-west of the city of Dzisna shortly before the confluence of the Dysna itself to the Western Dvina.

The valley is trapezoidal, width 150–250 m. The floodplain is high, the width is 100–150 m. The bed is slightly sinuous, the width is 4–6 m in the upper reaches, 8–10 m in the lower reaches. Near the village of Elovtsi there is a dam and a pond on the river.
