= Vosiūnai =

- Village
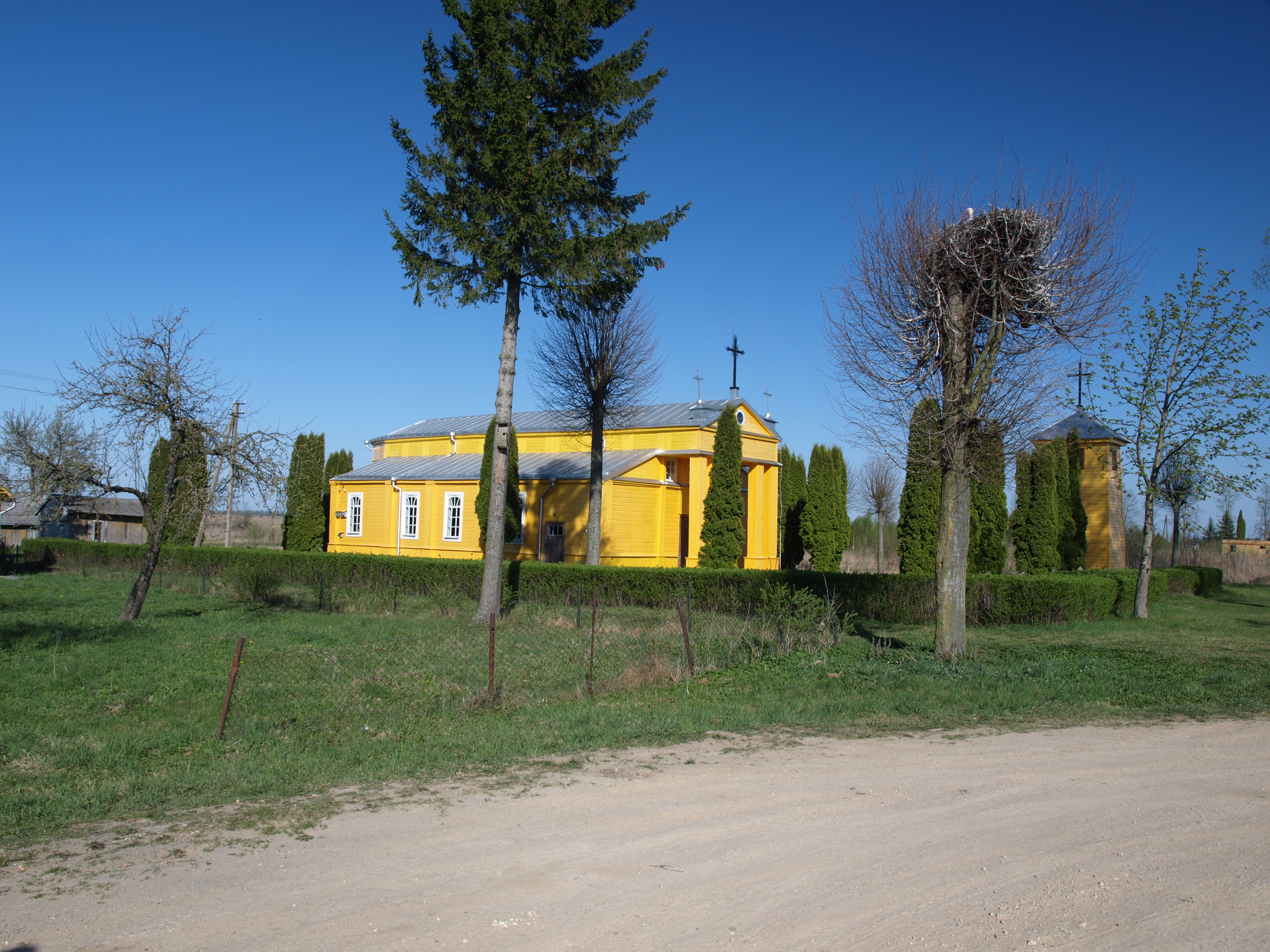
- Vosiūnai church

- Location in Lithuania
- Coordinates: 55°18′18″N 26°49′12″E
- Country: Lithuania
- County: Utena County
- Municipality: Ignalina District Municipality
- Eldership: Didžiasalis eldership

Population (2011)
  - Total: 29
- Time zone: UTC+2 (EET)
  - Summer (DST): UTC+3 (EEST)

Vosiūnai is a village in the eastern part of Ignalina district in Lithuania. According to the 2011 census, it had 29 residents. It is located 5 kilometres (3.1 mi) east of Navikai, near the border with Belarus. The village is situated on the right bank of the river Dysna. The village has a wooden Blessed Virgin Mary Church (built in 1921).

Together with the neighboring Rimaldiškė, Vosiūnai is the easternmost village in Lithuania.
