= Aleksiszki =

Former village in Vitebsk Region, Belarus

Aleksiszki Алексішкі (Belarusian) Алексицкий (Russian)
- Former village
- Location within Belarus
- Coordinates: 55°09′57″N 28°08′38″E
- Country: Belarus
- Region: Vitebsk Region
- District: Miory District

Population (1931)
  - Total: 39
- Time zone: UTC+3 (MSK)

Aleksiszki (Belarusian: Алексішкі; Russian: Алексицкий) is a former village located in what is now Belarus; the areas on which it was located are currently located in Vitebsk Oblast, Miory District, in Przebrodzie Village.

Aleksiszki was, in the 20th century, located in the Second Polish Republic.

== History ==
In the times of partitions a backwater in the Przebrodź commune, in Dzisień County, in Vilnius Governorate Russian Empire.

In the years 1921–1945, the village was located in Poland, in Wilno Voivodeship, (Note: The voivodeship affiliation changed. The village was located in Nowogródek Voivodeship (1921–1922), in Wilno Land (1922–1926) and in Vilnius Voivodeship (from 1926).) in Today's County, from 1926 in Braslaw County, in Przebrodzie commune.

According to the General Population Census of 1921, 27 people lived here, 2 were Orthodox and 25 Old Believers. At the same time, all residents declared Belarusian nationality. There were 7 residential buildings. In 1931, 39 people lived in 8 houses.

The faithful belonged to the Orthodox parish in Przebrodzie. The town was subject to the Magistrate's Court in Brasław and the District Court in Vilnius; the relevant post office was located in Przebrodzie.
