= Birvėta =

River in Lithuania and Belarus

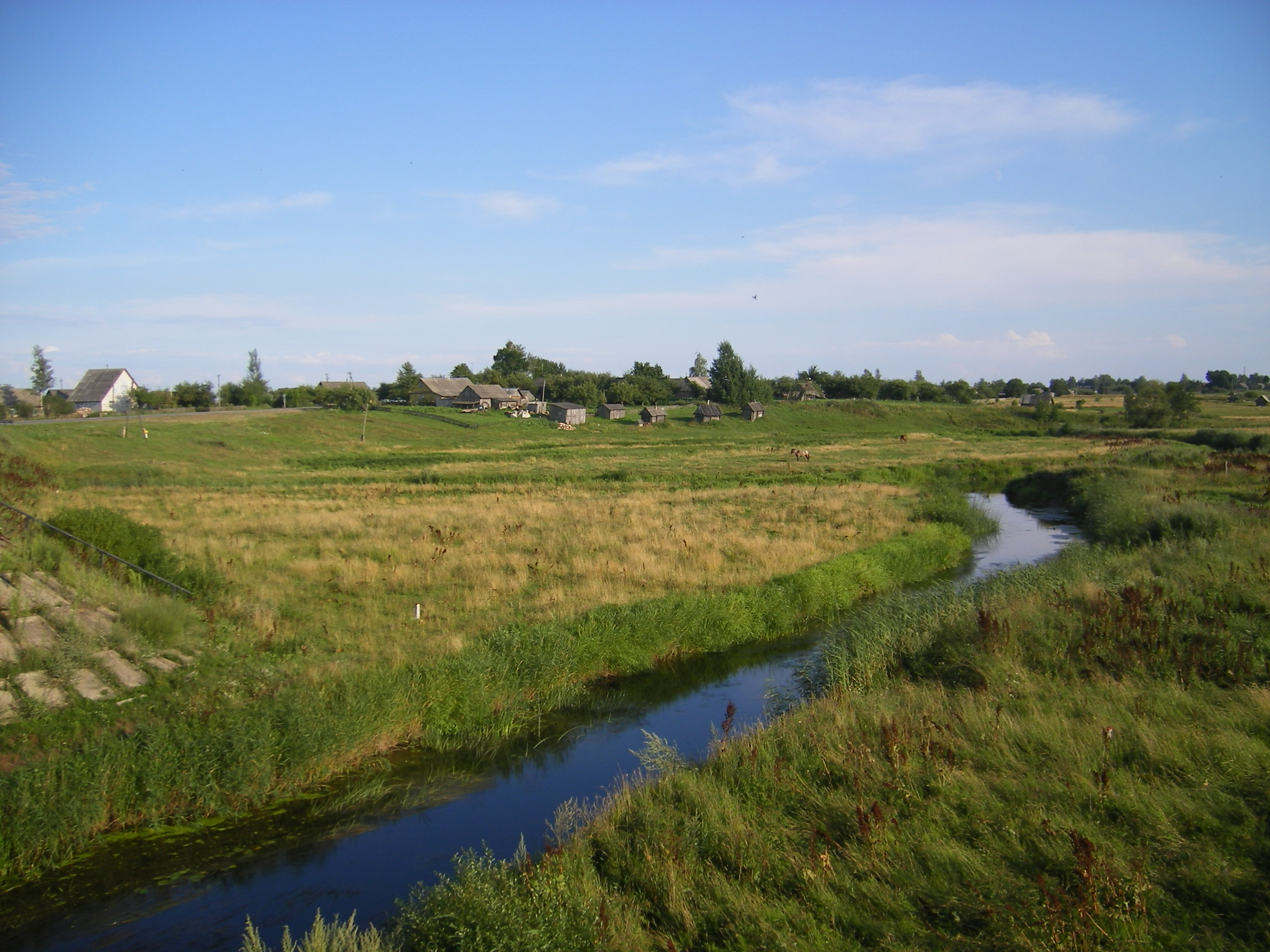
- Birvėta lowland near Kozyany, Belarus.

Location
- Countries: Belarus, Lithuania

Physical characteristics
- Source
  - location: Near Kirkučiai village
- Mouth: Dysna
  - coordinates: 55°16′55″N 26°52′17″E
- Length: 36.4 km (22.6 mi), with Kančiogina: 68 km (42 mi)

Basin features
- Progression: Dysna→ Daugava→ Baltic Sea
- Tributaries
  - left: Marūniškė
  - right: Svyla, Kamoya, Juodupis, Medila
- Waterbodies: Kančiogina

Birvėta (Belarusian: Бірвета) is a river in eastern Lithuania and Belarus (Vitebsk Region). It is a right tributary of Dysna.

== Course ==
The river starts near the Kirkučiai village, Sirvėta Regional Park, Švenčionys District. It flows north passing through the Kančioginas lake. From there, it flows north and east through the Ignalina District. Up to its confluence with the Erzvėtas lake, the river is known as Kančiogina. Next again flowing east, flows through swampy areas and passes by fishing ponds. After 65 kilometres (40 mi), Birvėta crosses the Belarus–Lithuania border and forms a natural border between the Pastavy and Braslaw Districts. It empties into the Dysna at 113 kilometres (70 mi) from Dysna's estuary to the south of Kaziany. Birvėta's valley is shallow and boggy.

Tributaries: Marūniškė (left), Svyla, Kamoja, Juodupis, Medila (right).

Villages near the river:

- Near Kančiogina: Purvėnai, Kančioginas, Barkuškė, Krikonys, Juodagalviai, Mielagėnai
- Near Birvėta: Erzvėtas, Kelpučiai, Kliukai, Kėkštai, Pivorai, Rimaldiškė
