= Pivorai =

- Village
- Location in Lithuania
- Coordinates: 55°18′18″N 26°44′28″E
- Country: Lithuania
- County: Utena County
- Municipality: Ignalina district municipality
- Eldership: Didžiasalis eldership

Population (2011)
  - Total: 30
- Time zone: UTC+2 (EET)
  - Summer (DST): UTC+3 (EEST)

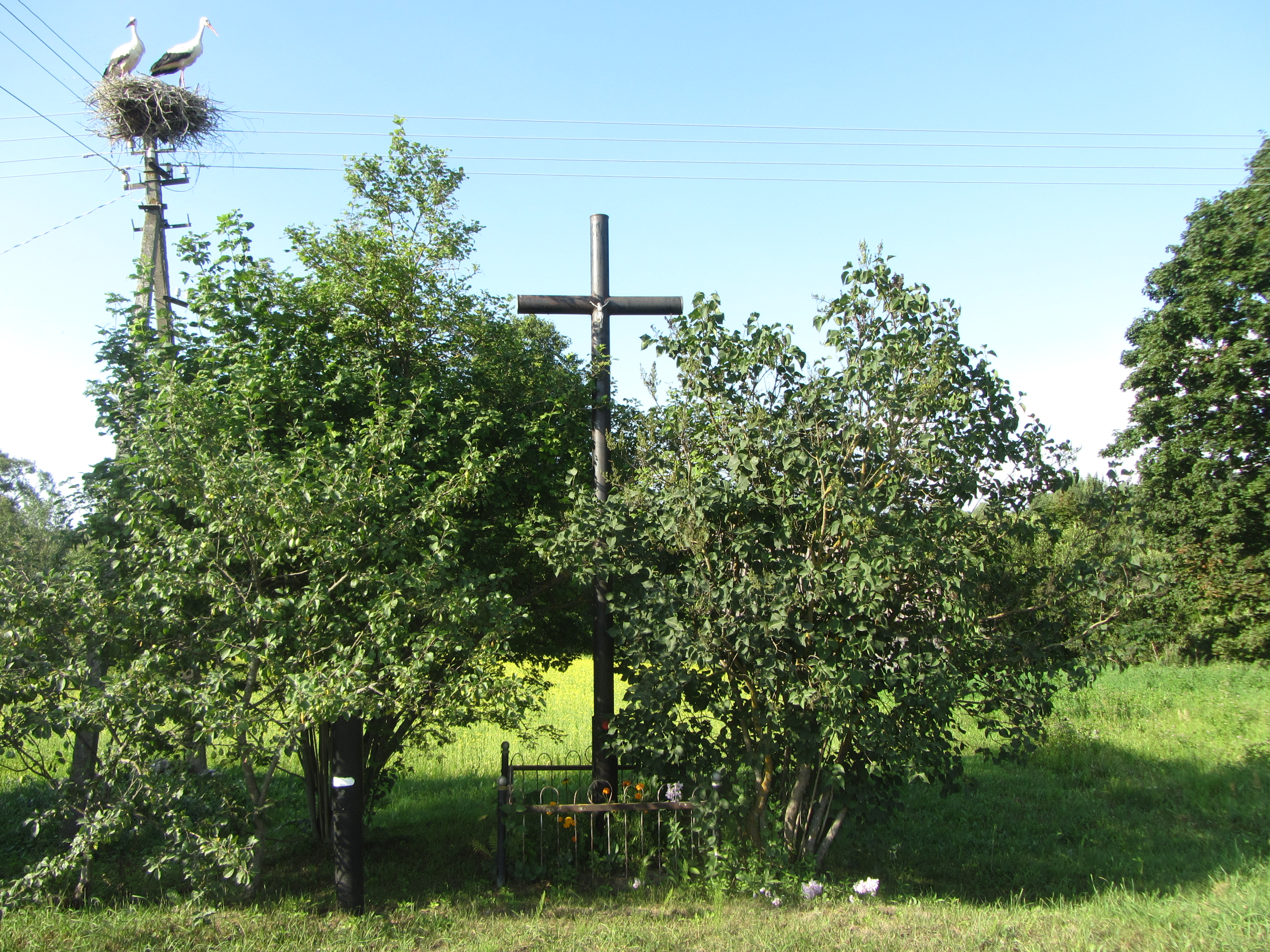

Pivorai − village in the southeast part of Ignalina district in Lithuania. According to the 2011 census, it had 30 residents. It is located 1,8 kilometres south of Galalaukiai. The village has a cemetery. In the village buried Lithuanian folk songs singer Kristina Skrebutėnienė.

== Nature and Geography ==
Through village flowing Birvėta river. Many plains. Near was a Adutiškis forest.
