= Dysnai =

Lake in Lithuania

Lake Dysnai
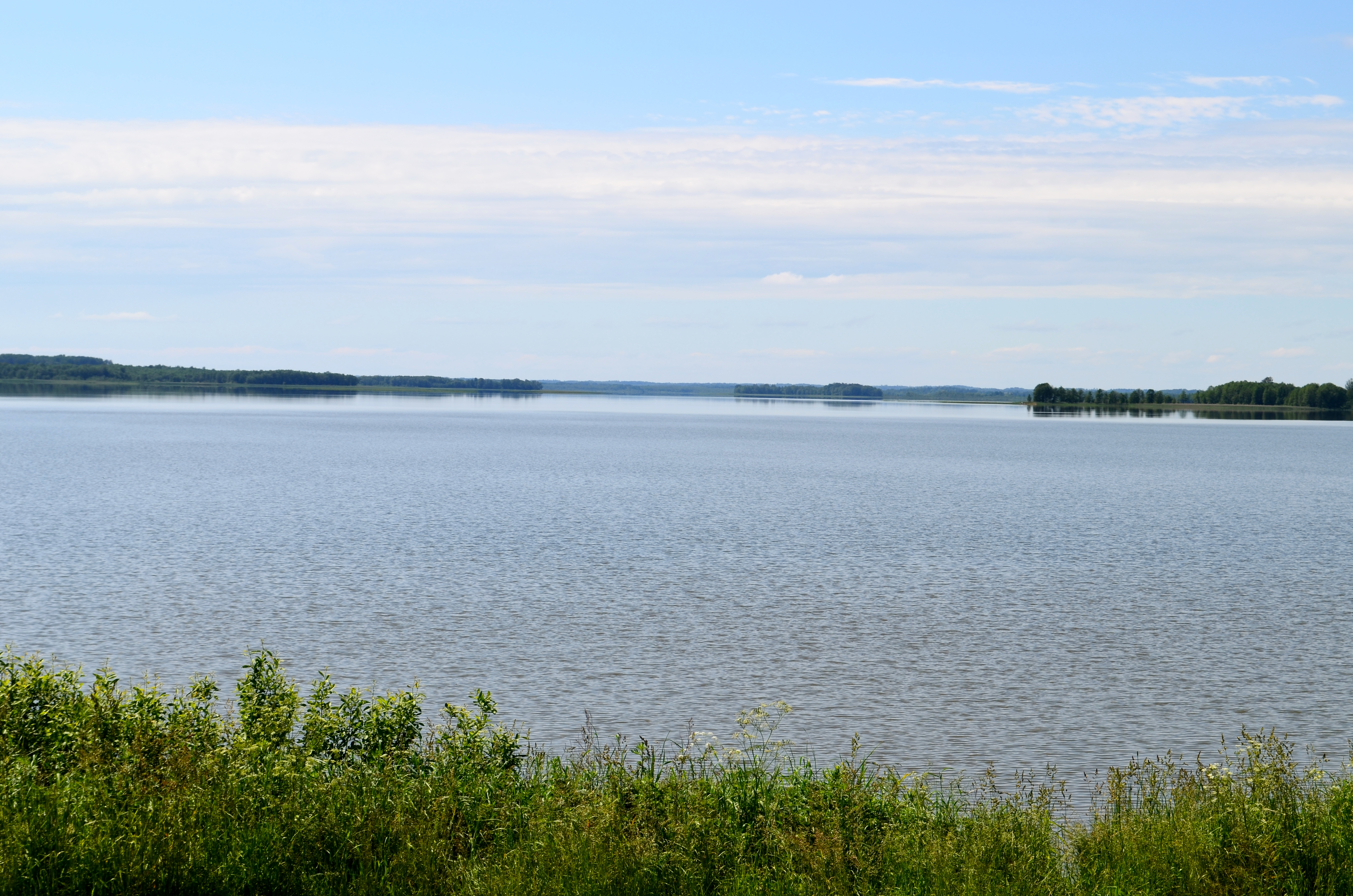
- Dysnai lake by village Čižiūnai

- Location within Lithuania
- Location: Ignalina district, Lithuania
- Coordinates: 55°29′21″N 26°19′59″E
- Primary outflows: Dysna
- Basin countries: Lithuania
- Max. length: 10.6 km (6.6 mi)
- Max. width: 4.7 km (2.9 mi)
- Surface area: 24.01 km^{2} (9.27 mi^{2})
- Average depth: 3 m (9.8 ft)
- Max. depth: 6 m (20 ft)
- Shore length^{1}: 36.7 km (22.8 mi)
- Islands: 6 (.25 km^{2} (0.097 mi^{2}))
- ^{1} Shore length is not a well-defined measure.

The Lake Dysnai is the second largest lake in Lithuania. With an average depth of only 6 m (20 ft), it is one of the shallowest lakes in Lithuania. It is located in the Ignalina district municipality, about 3 km (1.9 mi) south of Dūkštas city. Dūkštas Train Station is the closest train station to the Lake Dysnai (route Vilnius-Turmantas). It is approximately a 2 hours ride by train from Vilnius, the capital of Lithuania.

Dysnai is connected with the Lake Dysnykštis. Dysna River, a tributary to the Daugava River, flows through the Lake Dysnai. Since 1988, the lake has hosted annual festival Dysnai by workers of nearby Ignalina Nuclear Power Plant.
