= Dysna (village) =

- Village
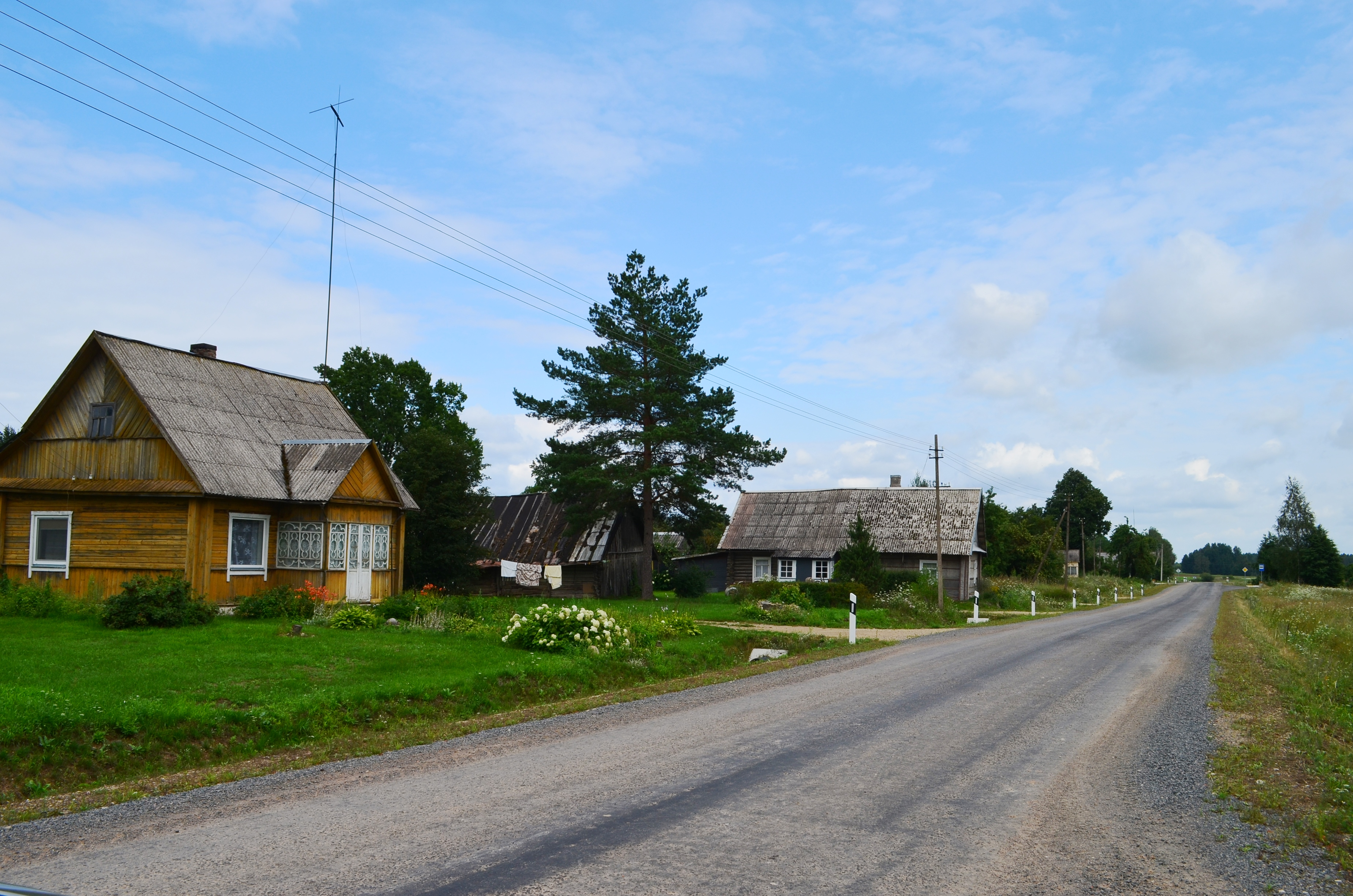

- Location in Lithuania
- Coordinates: 55°18′58″N 26°47′02″E
- Country: Lithuania
- County: Utena County
- Municipality: Ignalina district municipality
- Eldership: Didžiasalis eldership

Population (2011)
  - Total: 62
- Time zone: UTC+2 (EET)
  - Summer (DST): UTC+3 (EEST)

Dysna (Polish: Dzisna) is a village in the eastern part of Ignalina district in Lithuania. According to the 2011 census, it had 62 residents. It is located 12 kilometres (7.5 mi) east of Tverečius, near the border with Belarus. The village is situated on the right bank of the river Dysna, which gives the village its name. The village has a chapel, section of Didžiasalis school, and public library.

The nearby clay deposit is one of three largest in Lithuania and was used commercially in 1974–95.

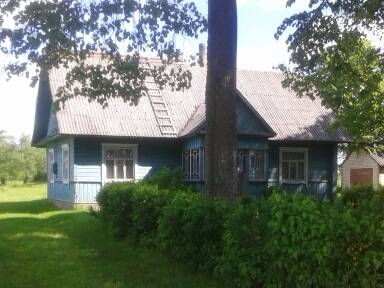
The house in Dysna where Augustinas Voldemaras lived.

The Lithuanian national and political activist and parliament member Augustinas Voldemaras was born and lived in the village.

== Gallery ==
=== Landscape in Dysna ===
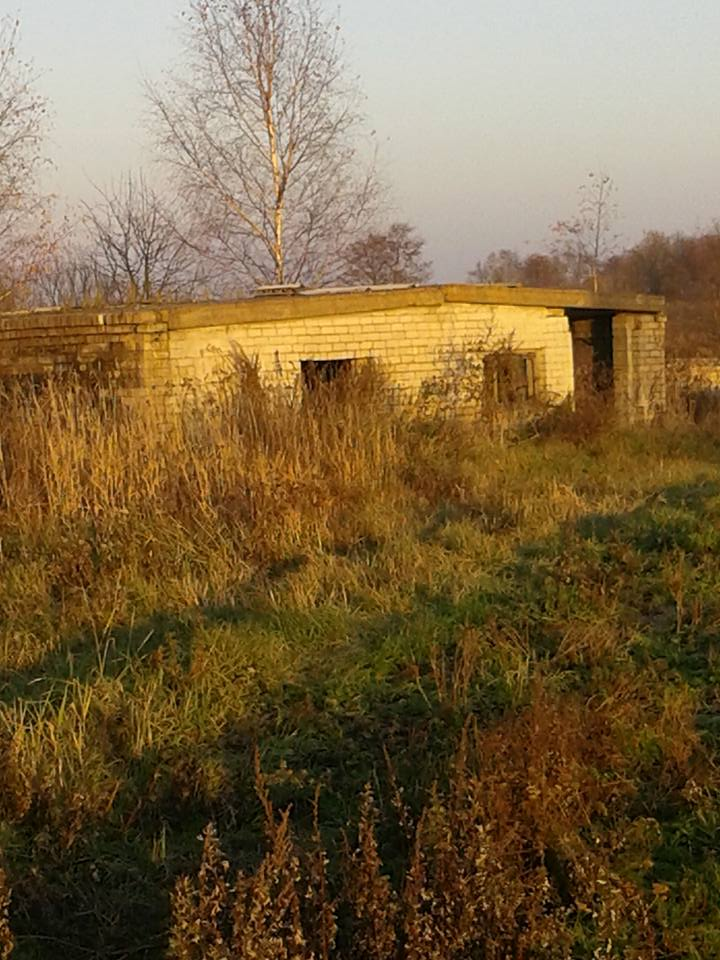
Abandoned food preparation hut

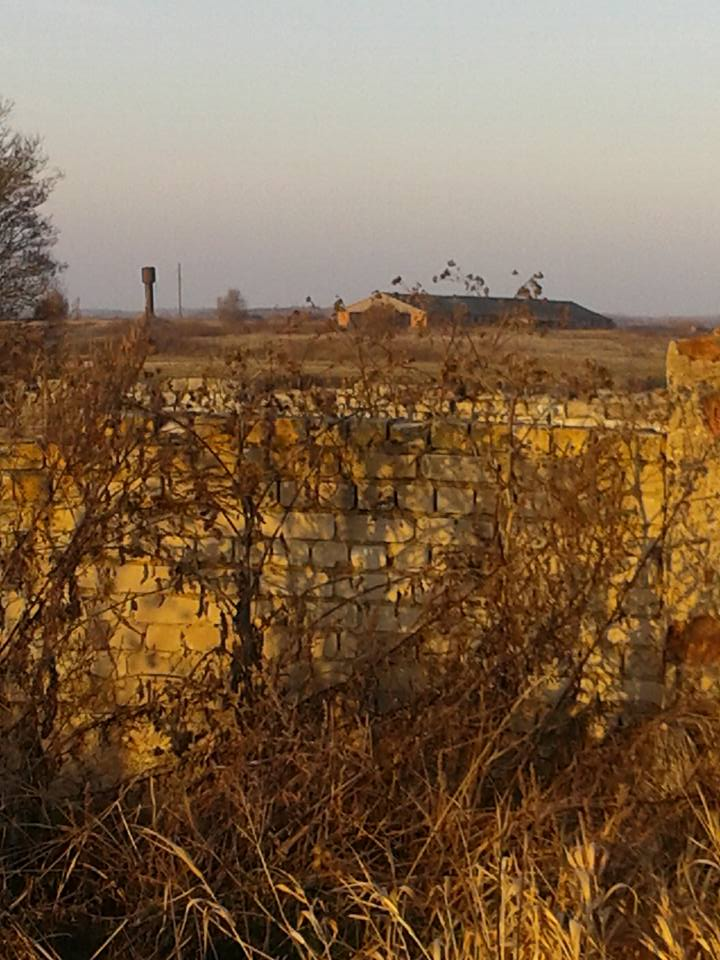
Abandoned farm. In the distance you can see the Belarusian farm with a water tower

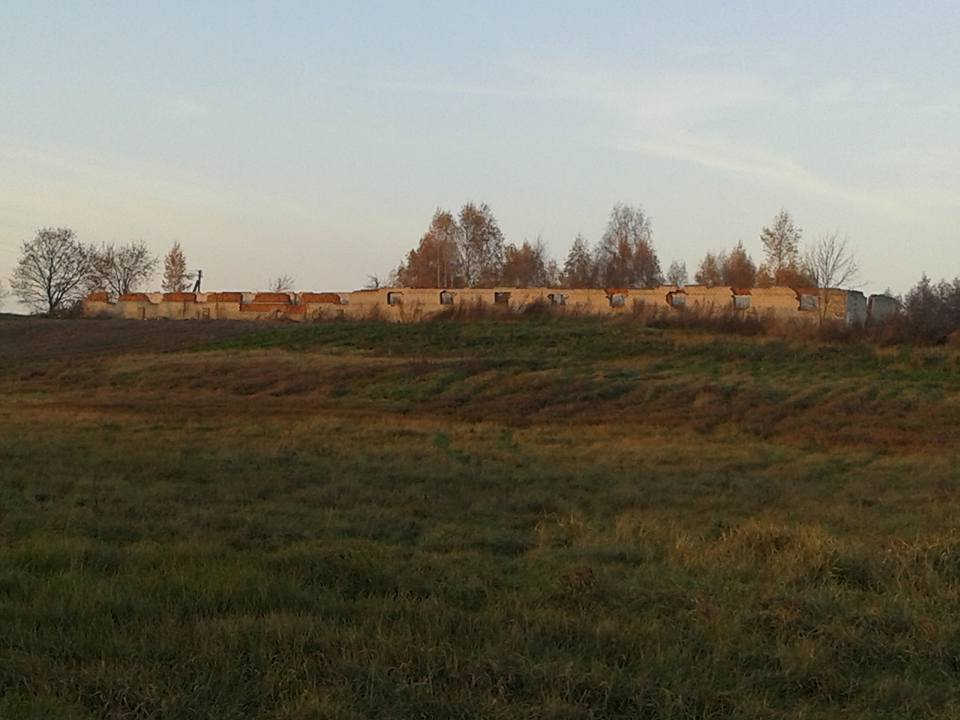
Soviet Period abandoned farm

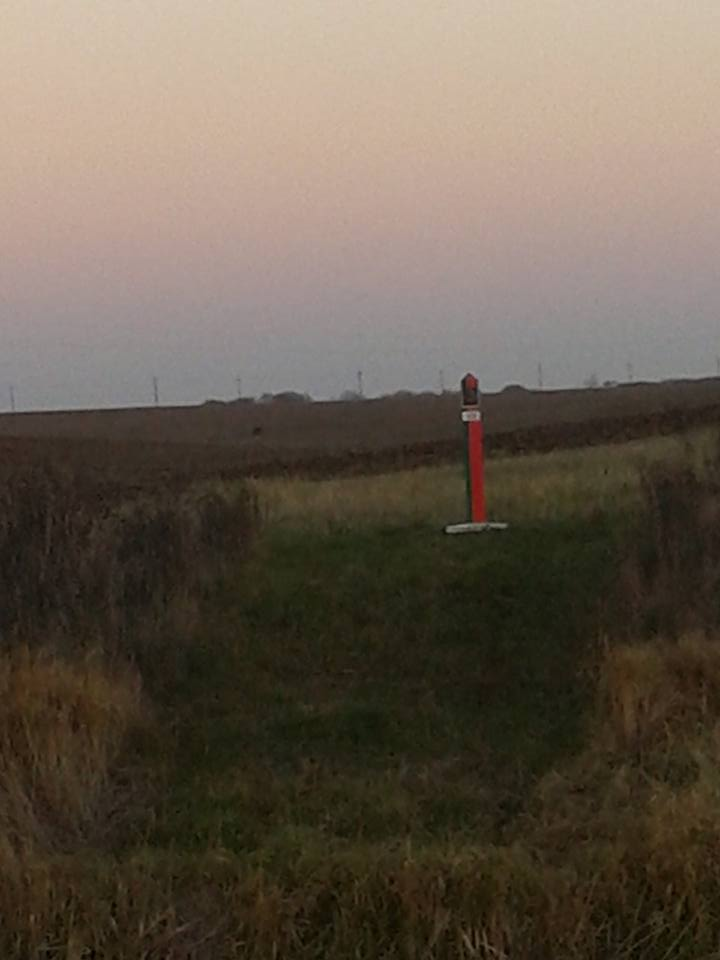
Belarus - Lithuania border landmark near Buchyany village in Belarus

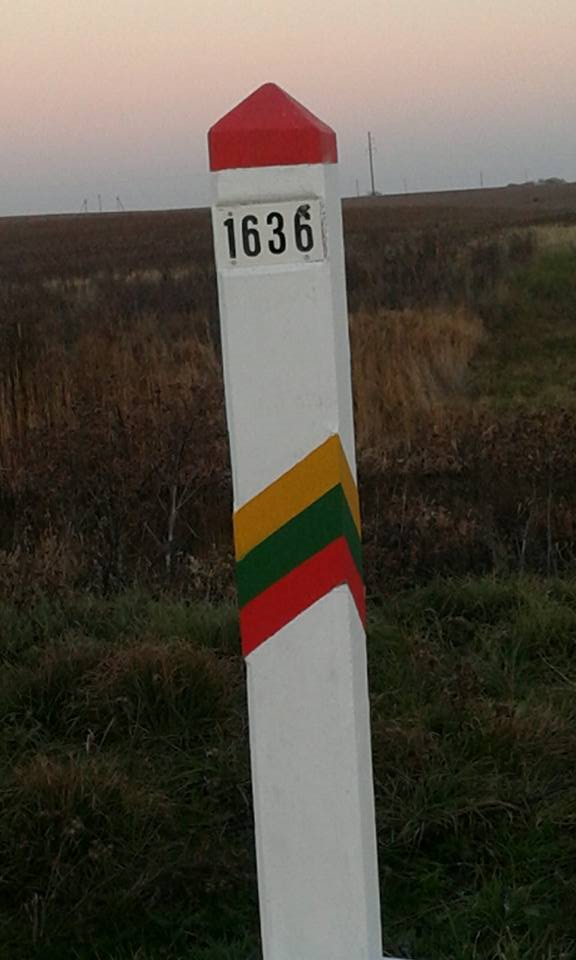
Lithuanian border landmark No. 1636

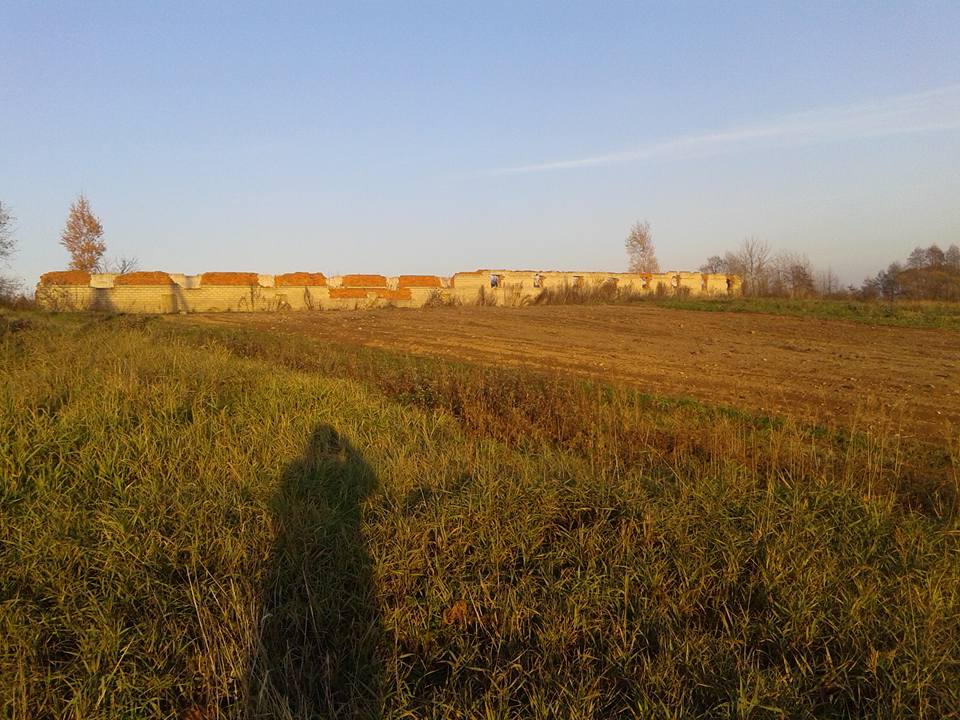
Abandoned farm (2)
