= Miory =

Miory: Мёры (Belarusian); Миоры (Russian)
- Town
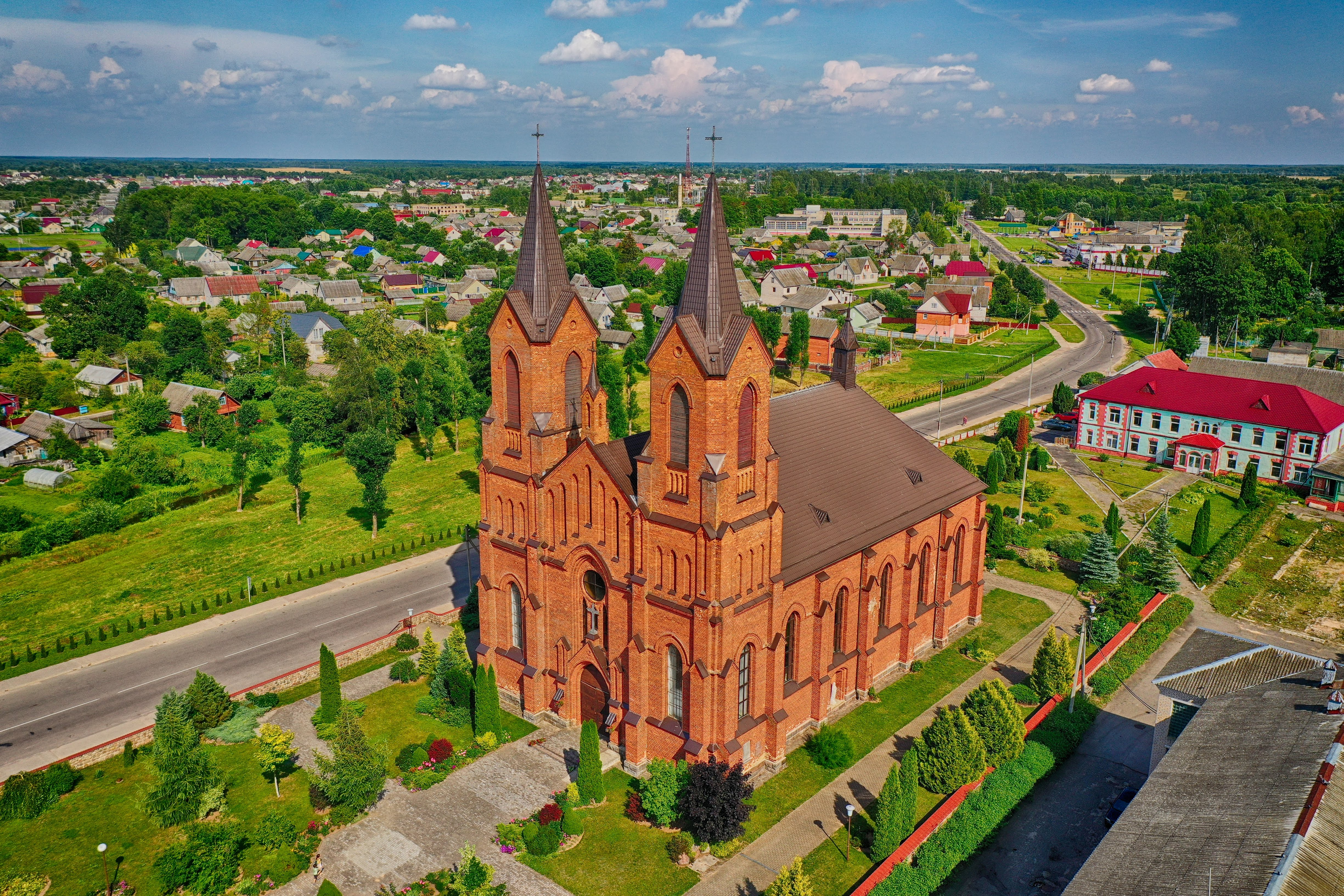
- Church of the Assumption of the Blessed Virgin Mary

- Flag Coat of arms

- Location within Belarus
- Coordinates: 55°37′N 27°37′E
- Country: Belarus
- Region: Vitebsk Region
- District: Miory District
- First mentioned: 1514

Population (2025)
  - Total: 7,756
- Time zone: UTC+3 (MSK)
- Postal code: 211287
- Area code: +375 2152
- License plate: 2
- Website: miory.vitebsk-region.gov.by

Miory or Myory (Note: Belarusian: Мёры; Russian: Миоры; Lithuanian: Mėrai; Polish: Miory.) is a town in Vitebsk Region, in northern Belarus. It serves as the administrative center of Miory District. As of 2025, it has a population of 7,756.

== History ==
The town was first mentioned in 1514. Miory was a private town, administratively located in the Vilnius Voivodeship of the Polish–Lithuanian Commonwealth. In 1640 it passed from the Ryłło to the Mirski family.

Within interwar Poland, it was administratively located in the Nowogródek Voivodeship until 1922, then the Wilno Land until 1926, and the Wilno Voivodeship afterwards.

During World War II, Miory was occupied by Soviet forces in September 1939. A local Polish forester was murdered by the Russians in the Katyn massacre in 1940. Following the German invasion of the Soviet Union on 22 June 1941, Soviet forces withdrew from the town, and local anti-Semites committed a pogrom against the town's Jewish population, killing the rabbi, Dov Bear Pianco, and his wife. German forces occupied the town on 3 July 1941. For the next three years until 4 July 1944, Miory was occupied by Nazi Germany and administered as a part of Generalbezirk Weißruthenien of Reichskommissariat Ostland. A ghetto was set up in the town, and all Jews were kept imprisoned there. A judenrat was established, led by businessman Zvi Hersch Hellman. The Jews of Miory were later joined by other Jews, who sneaked into the ghetto after fleeing other nearby towns. Prior to the war, the town had been home to 500 Jews, most of them agricultural workers or craftsmen. In October 1941, some young Jews from the ghetto were arrested by German forces and sentenced to death for "conspiracy against the German government", but the judenrat was able to stay the execution.

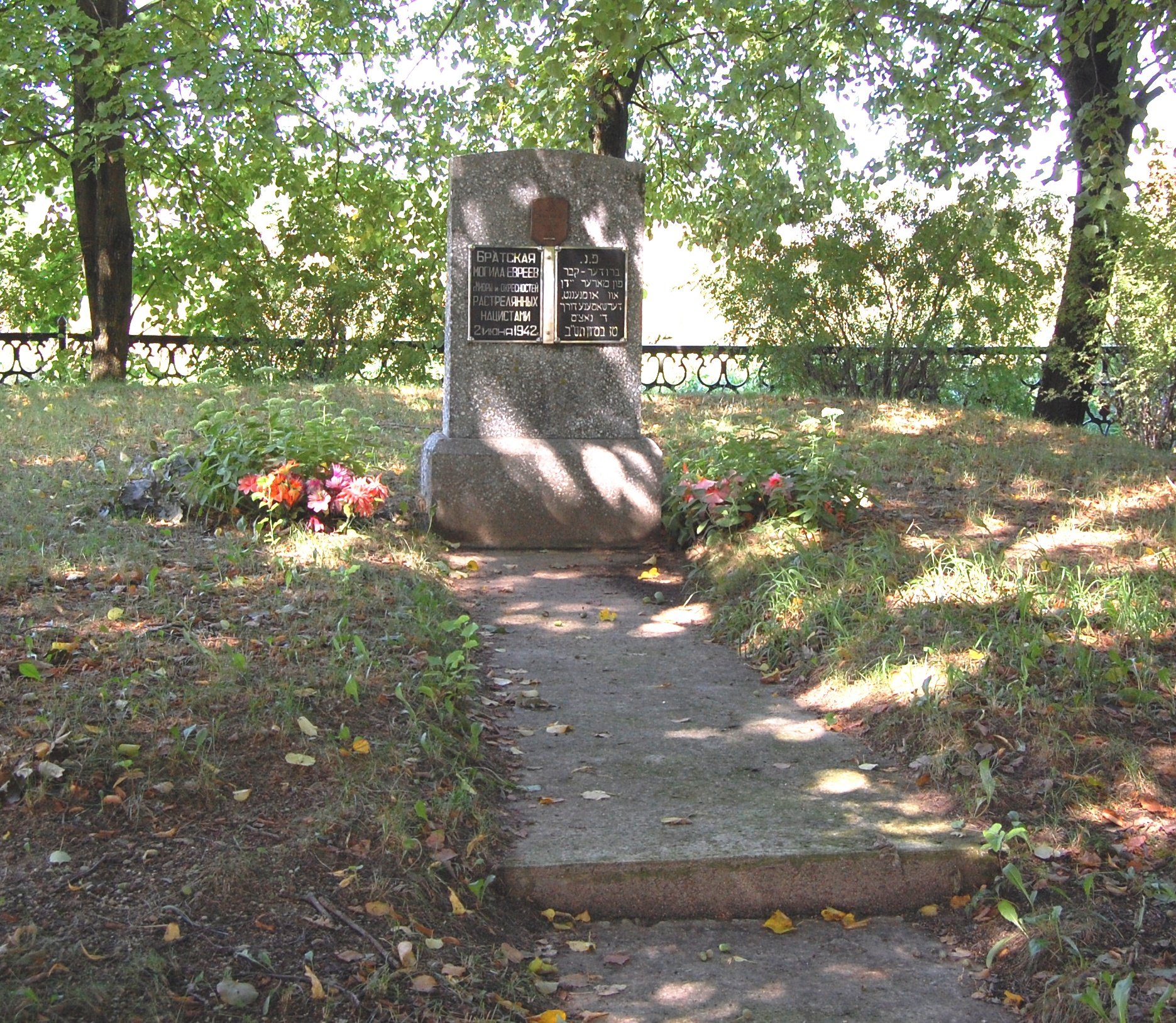
Monument at the massacre site

On 2 June 1942, Jews were ordered to gather in the square and were then taken into the forest in the direction of Krukówka village. The Germans killed 779 people in the forest. About 80 people, however managed to escape, some of them going on to join a partisan group. The final liquidation of the ghetto in Miory took place in December 1942. A monument was later built at the site of the 2 June massacre.
