= Navikai =

- Village
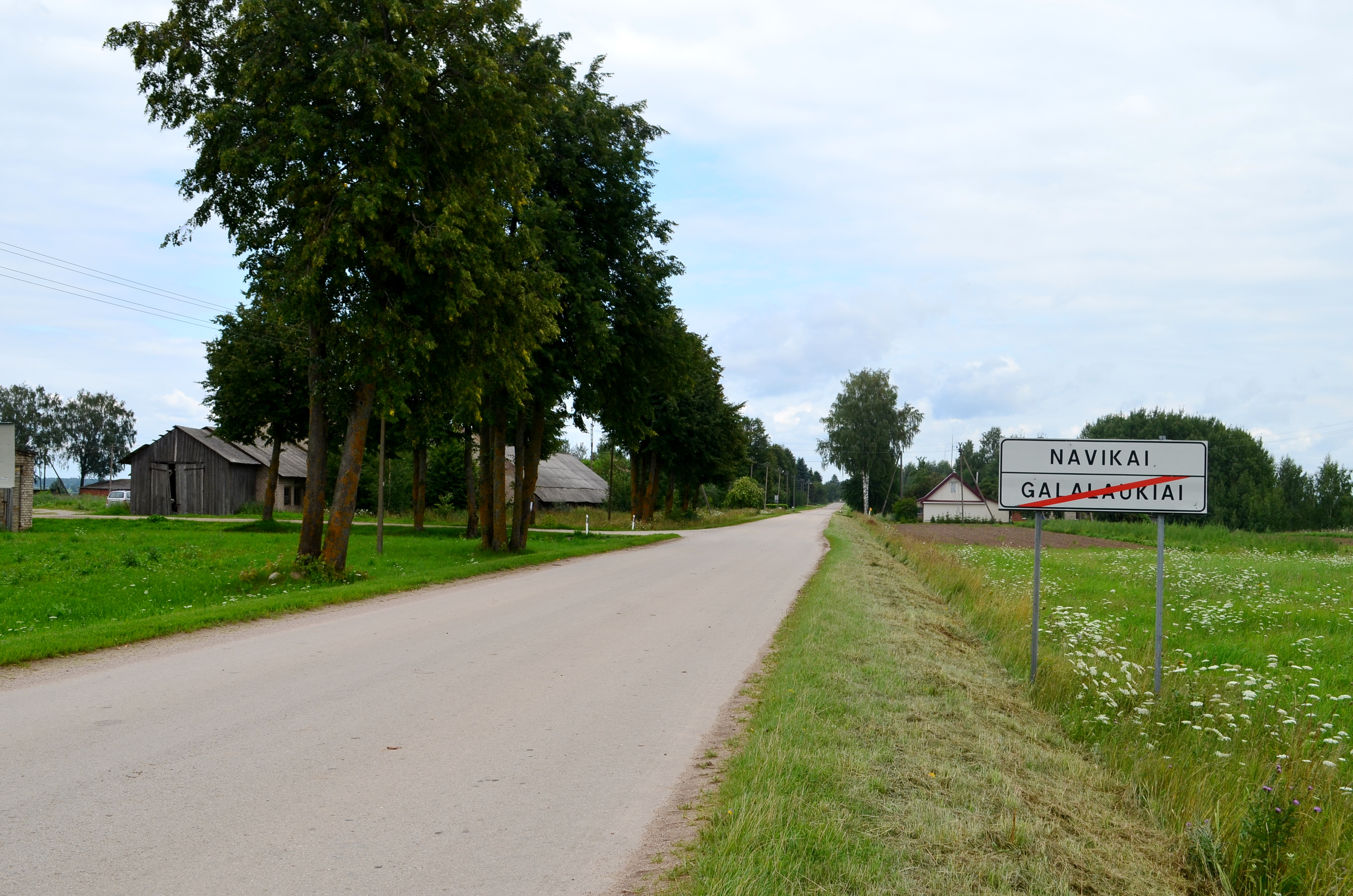

- Location in Lithuania
- Coordinates: 55°18′54″N 26°45′29″E
- Country: Lithuania
- County: Utena County
- Municipality: Ignalina District Municipality
- Eldership: Didžiasalis eldership

Population (2021)
  - Total: 76
- Time zone: UTC+2 (EET)
  - Summer (DST): UTC+3 (EEST)

Navikai is a village in the eastern part of Ignalina district in Lithuania. According to the 2011 census, it had 124 residents. It is located 6 kilometres (3.7 mi) east of Didžiasalis, near the border with Belarus. The village is situated on the left bank of the river Dysna. The village has a shop, JSC "Birvėta ponds", a cemetery and a car repair shop. In the south of the village lie many ponds.

== Notable people ==
- Nikolay Rudzinkas (1933–2006), canoeist
