= Galalaukiai =

- Village
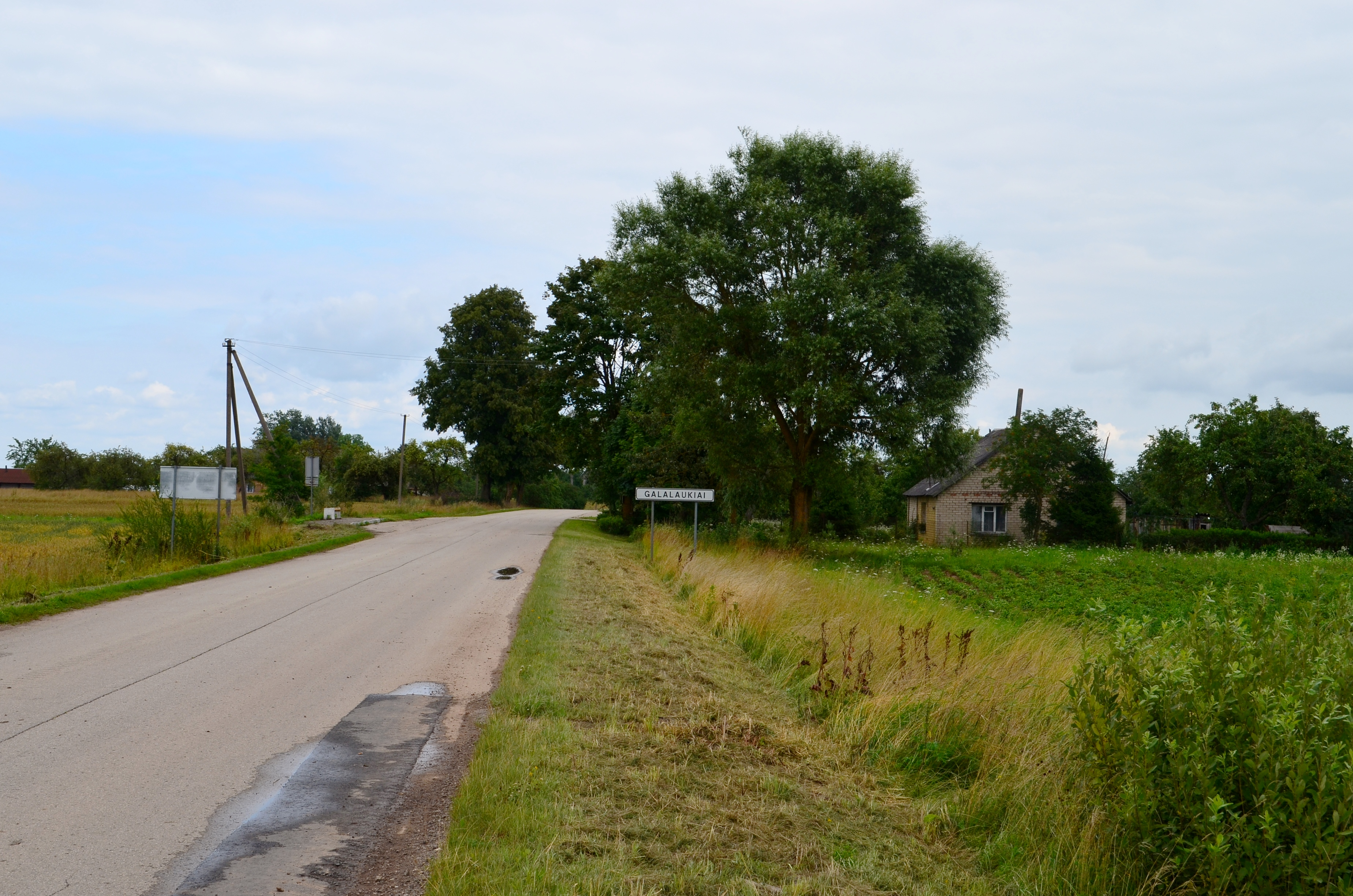

- Location in Lithuania
- Coordinates: 55°18′58″N 26°43′26″E
- Country: Lithuania
- County: Utena County
- Municipality: Ignalina district municipality
- Eldership: Didžiasalis eldership

Population (2011)
  - Total: 25
- Time zone: UTC+2 (EET)
  - Summer (DST): UTC+3 (EEST)

Galalaukiai (Polish: Końcepole) is a village in the eastern part of Ignalina district in Lithuania. It is located 1 kilometres east of Didžiasalis and 1 kilometres east of Dysna village near the border with Belarus. According to the 2011 census, it had 25 residents.
