= Augustinas Voldemaras =

Prime Minister of Lithuania (1918, 1926–1929)

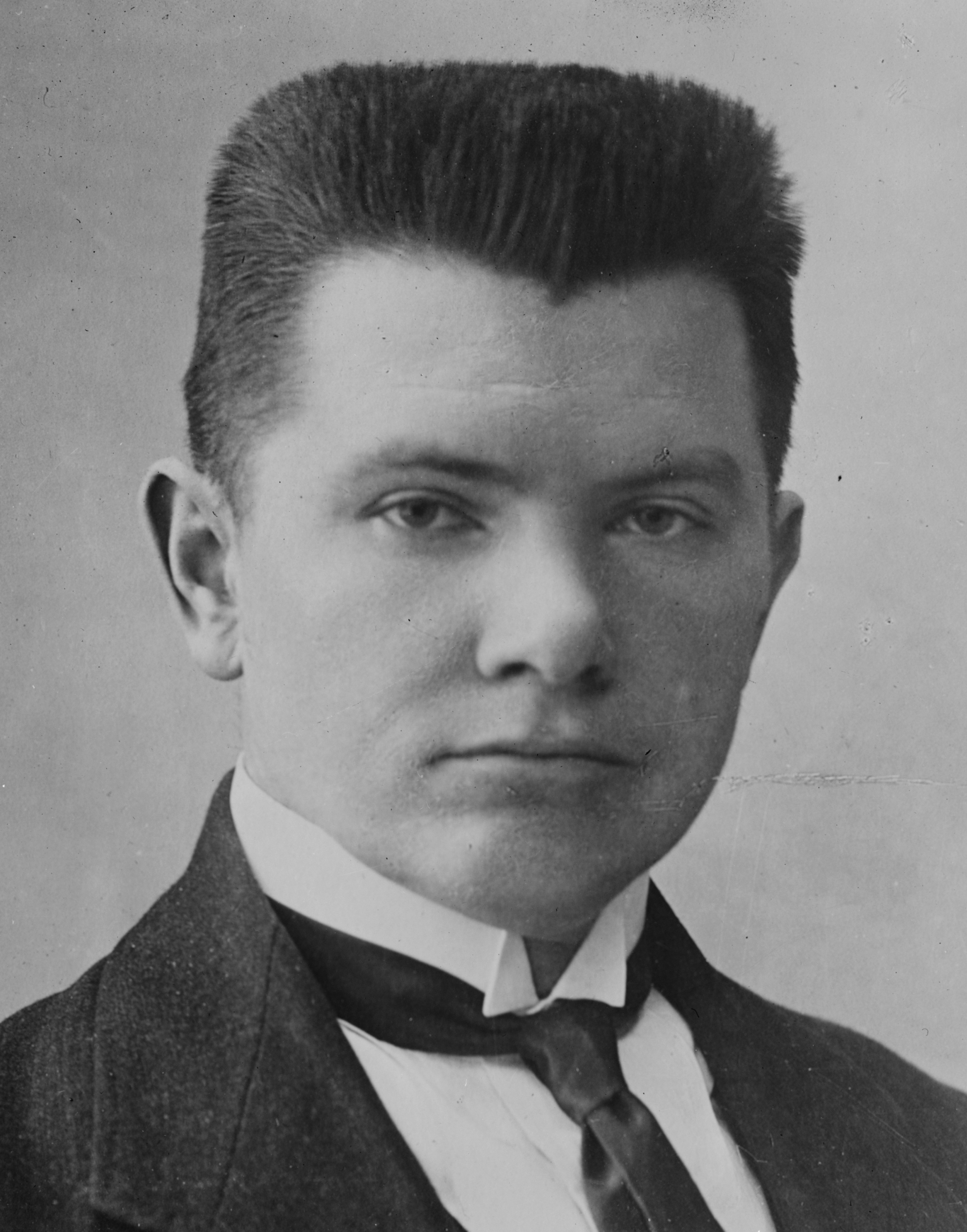

1st and 12th Prime Minister of Lithuania
- In office 11 November 1918 – 26 December 1918
- Succeeded by: Mykolas Sleževičius
- In office 17 December 1926 – 23 September 1929
- President: Antanas Smetona
- Preceded by: Mykolas Sleževičius
- Succeeded by: Juozas Tūbelis

Minister of Foreign Affairs
- In office 11 November 1918 – 19 June 1920
- Prime Minister: Himself; Mykolas Sleževičius; Pranas Dovydaitis; Ernestas Galvanauskas
- Succeeded by: Juozas Purickis
- In office 17 December 1926 – 23 September 1929
- Prime Minister: Himself
- Preceded by: Mykolas Sleževičius
- Succeeded by: Juozas Tūbelis

Minister of Defense
- In office 11 November 1918 – 24 December 1918
- Prime Minister: Himself
- Succeeded by: Mykolas Velykis

Personal details
- Born: 16 April 1883 Dysna, Sventsyansky Uyezd, Vilna Governorate, Russian Empire
- Died: 16 May 1942 (aged 59) Moscow, Russian SFSR, Soviet Union
- Party: Party of National Progress (1916–1924); Lithuanian Nationalist Union (1924–1929)
- Spouse: Matilda Voldemarienė
- Education: Saint Petersburg Imperial University

Augustinas Voldemaras (16 April 1883 – 16 May 1942) was a Lithuanian nationalist political figure. He briefly served as the country's first prime minister in 1918 and continued serving as the minister of foreign affairs until 1920, representing the fledgling Lithuanian state at the Versailles Peace Conference and the League of Nations. After some time in academia, Voldemaras returned to politics in 1926, when he was elected to the Third Seimas.

Dissatisfied with the left-wing government of President Kazys Grinius, Voldemaras and fellow nationalist Antanas Smetona supported the military coup d'état in December 1926 and he was appointed as the prime minister for a second time. A brilliant orator, Voldemaras represented the radical wing of the Lithuanian Nationalist Union that was increasingly critical of the more moderate policies of President Smetona. Smetona had Voldemaras removed from office in September 1929 and exiled to Zarasai. Voldemaras was arrested in 1934 after the failed coup against Smetona and served a prison sentence until he was exiled to France in 1938. Returning to Lithuania soon after the Soviet occupation of Lithuania, he was promptly arrested by the Soviet authorities and died in their custody in Moscow.

== Early life and education ==
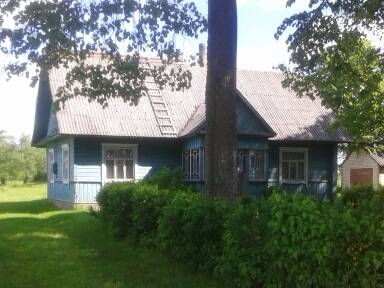
Augustinas Voldemaras's house in Dysna

Voldemaras was born on 16 April 1883 in Dysna village in what is now Ignalina district municipality, Lithuania (then part of the Vilna Governorate of the Russian Empire). Though born to a family of modest means and education, Augustinas excelled at his studies. He finished public school in nearby Tverečius and graduated from a three-year school in Švenčionys. In 1890, he moved to Saint Petersburg to join his brother who had been working there. In 1902, Voldemaras passed the exams to enter a gymnasium, eventually graduating with distinction in 1904. While preparing for the exams in 1901, Voldemaras met Antanas Smetona, who would become his close friend, political collaborator, and, eventually, his political nemesis.

In 1909, Voldemaras graduated with a degree in History and Philosophy at the Saint Petersburg Imperial University and, in 1910, received his Master's Degree and was awarded a gold medal for his dissertation. A scholarship fund was set up to enable him to further his studies, and eventually, he achieved his PhD. After a period of studying in Italy and Sweden, Voldemaras returned to the university (now named Petrograd Imperial University) in 1915 and joined its staff. He moved to Perm to become a professor when the Imperial University opened its branch there (the branch would later become Perm State University). However, Voldemaras was not satisfied with the living conditions in Perm and planned his return to Lithuania.

== Political career ==
=== Entry into politics ===
Voldemaras first entered politics as a student in Saint Petersburg. The nationalism sweeping Lithuania in the Russian Empire included prominent voices calling for Lithuanian independence or autonomy within the Empire. Voldemaras joined the newly established Party of National Progress in 1916 and a group of Lithuanian students in Saint Petersburg, representing it at the Petrograd Seimas in June 1917 and the Congress of Non-Sovereign Nations in Kiev in September 1917. In 1918, he represented Lithuanian interests at the peace negotiations for the Treaty of Brest-Litovsk between Germany and the Soviet Russia. Since Lithuania was not part of the negotiations, he was officially part of the delegation of the short-lived Ukrainian People's Republic. His influence at the conference was minimal and Lithuania was claimed by Germany as part of the settlement.

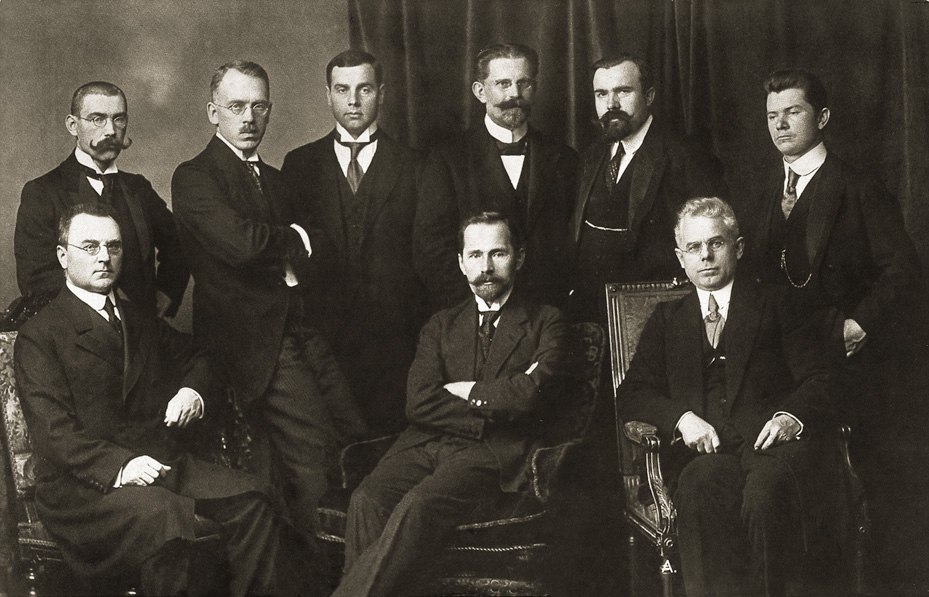
The Council of Lithuania in 1918. Augustinas Voldemaras is standing on the far right

In 1918, Voldemaras returned to Lithuania and joined the Council of Lithuania after several members left it in protest of its alignment with Germany. One of the many problems facing the council was the lack of unity among Lithuanian organizations — several were claiming to represent Lithuania on the international stage. In September 1918, Voldemaras and Smetona participated in a conference in Lausanne, Switzerland, helping to unite the organizations behind the Council of Lithuania. Events moved rapidly after the defeat of Germany in the World War I. Germany recognized Lithuanian independence and its army withdrew. The Presidium of the Council of Lithuania, which had been acting as a collective head of state, chose Voldemaras as the first Prime Minister of Lithuania and allowed him to form the government.

=== On the Government of Lithuania ===
Voldemaras assumed power on 11 November 1918 and formed a cabinet, taking two cabinet positions for himself: the Ministry of Foreign Affairs and the Ministry of Defense. Voldemaras's first stated priority was to ensure the internal stability of the country; he hoped that a statement of neutrality would deter foreign interference for a time. Nevertheless, on 23 November, he signed the order creating the Lithuanian armed forces and appointed General Kyprian Kandratovich as Deputy Minister of Defense. This appointment proved very unpopular. Kondratovich was an ethnic Belarusian viewed with suspicion by many. He failed to take measures to organize the defense of the country and proposed to move the government to Grodno when Vilnius was threatened by a Soviet advance. He was dismissed on 24 December 1918.

Voldemaras and Smetona left Lithuania on 21 December 1918. The stated purpose of their trip was to secure a badly needed loan from Germany and to participate in the Versailles Peace Conference, but the departure generated outrage in Lithuania, where Voldemaras was seen as fleeing the Soviet advance. In absentia, he was replaced as the prime minister on 26 December 1918 by Mykolas Sleževičius. Furious with these events, Voldemaras nevertheless continued to serve as Minister of Foreign affairs and stayed in Versailles representing Lithuania.

The Lithuanian representatives there focused on recognition of independent Lithuania and its borders, as well as support in its struggle against Bolsheviks. Voldemaras and his colleagues found little support among the Great Powers: those who supported a strong Russia saw Lithuania as an integral part of that state, while the proponents of Poland as a bulwark against Bolshevism thought Lithuanian independence would weaken it. Voldemaras also found it difficult to secure recognition for Lithuania after the end of the conference. The United States refused recognition in November 1919 and granted it only in 1922, and Soviet Russia refused peace negotiations at the beginning of 1920.

In June 1920, Voldemaras resigned along with the rest of the cabinet, to make way for the government formed by the elections to the constituent assembly. Voldemaras did not take part in the assembly, and instead returned to academia.

=== Coup d'état and ascent to power ===
Even in academia, Voldemaras continued to publish political articles and essays, often critical of the government. In 1923, his political writings earned him one month of forced labor in Varniai. In 1926, Voldemaras was elected to the Seimas and was particularly critical of President Kazys Grinius and his government, which came to power after the elections of 1926. He saw Grinius as too lenient on minority rights and advocated for a stronger, more dictatorial government like the fascist regimes that were gaining power in much of Europe at the time.

In 1926, a segment of the army that disagreed with the Grinius administration planned a military coup d'état. They appealed for support to Voldemaras and Antanas Smetona, now leaders of the Lithuanian Nationalist Union, and both agreed. The coup took place on 17 December, deposing Grinius and installing Smetona as the president for a second time and Voldemaras as prime minister. To assuage public opinion in both Lithuania and the outside world, Grinius agreed to appoint Voldemaras as the prime minister on the condition that he uphold the constitution of 1922. Although Voldemaras did make this commitment, he and Smetona reneged on it within a year, when the Third Seimas was dissolved and no new elections were called. Voldemaras joked at the time that he had promised to hold elections, but had made no promises about in which year. This move prompted the Christian Democrats to leave the government, leaving the Nationalist Union in power as the sole governing party. Finally, in 1928, the constitution of 1922 was scrapped altogether and replaced by a new constitution without following the constitutional procedures and without any sort of approval from the voters or the legislature.

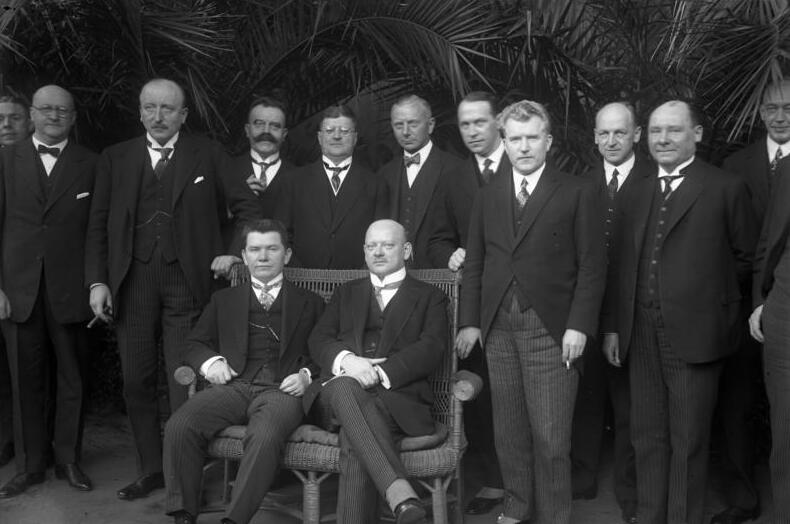
Augustinas Voldemaras (sitting on the left) and Gustav Stresemann in Berlin (1928)

Voldemaras again assumed the role of minister of foreign affairs and prime minister, seeing foreign relations as the key issue of the government. In January 1928, Voldemaras signed a border treaty with Germany, in which Germany accepted Lithuanian possession of Klaipėda (Memel) and also a trade agreement with the United Kingdom the same year.

In 1926-27, he saw to it that the Geležinis Vilkas (Iron Wolf) organization was established among right-wing army officers and students. Ostensibly a youth sport organization and registered as such in 1928, Iron Wolf was heavily nationalistic, with a stated purpose of combating the enemies of the state. Their ideology and practices (initiates would kiss an iron dagger as part of their initiation ceremony) were outside the comfort zone of many among the populace and the political elite. Although Smetona was the honorary head of the organization, it was Voldemaras who actively managed it. His personality and oratory skills attracted younger nationalist officers, who were favorably impressed by the emerging fascism, and displeased with what they perceived as Smetona's more moderate course. On the other hand, Voldemaras was unpopular with foreign representatives in Lithuania, who perceived him as too radical and arrogant.

=== Assassination attempt and fall from power ===
Geležinis Vilkas and Voldemaras's more radical stance created friction with Smetona. As early as the beginning of 1929, Smetona was preparing to oust Voldemaras from the government. These initial plans were revised by an attempt on Voldemaras's life in May.

On 6 May 1929, as Voldemaras, his wife, and some friends approached a theater in Kaunas, they were shot at from behind. At least seven shots were fired, killing Voldemaras's adjutant and injuring several others. Voldemaras and his wife escaped unharmed, but his nephew was seriously hurt. Three Lithuanian students, members of Aušrininkai, were accused of involvement in the assassination attempt, with one of them sentenced and executed. The outpouring of public and international support made it impossible for Smetona to dismiss Voldemaras, but pushed the latter to get even more involved with Geležinis Vilkas.

On 19 September 1929, while attending a meeting of the League of Nations, Voldemaras was ousted by President Smetona after the cabinet resigned. Smetona installed his brother-in-law Juozas Tūbelis as prime minister. In 1930, Voldemaras was exiled to Plateliai and later to Zarasai, where he lived under police surveillance. It was from Zarasai that he was flown into Kaunas during an attempted coup against Smetona in June 1934. Several officers sympathetic to Voldemaras and associated with Geležinis Vilkas attempted to replace Smetona, but the coup did not have widespread support and was unsuccessful. Voldemaras was imprisoned for the next four years, receiving amnesty on the condition he leave the country. He chose France as his destination.

== Later life and death ==
Voldemaras attempted to return to Lithuania in 1939, but was exiled again. In June 1940, days after the Soviet Union invaded and occupied Lithuania, Voldemaras and his wife tried again to return from exile. He was arrested at the border and imprisoned. It later emerged that he died in Moscow's Butyrka prison on 16 December 1942. His place of burial is unknown; a memorial stone for him was unveiled in the Petrašiūnai cemetery in Kaunas in 2012.

== Other activities and personal life ==
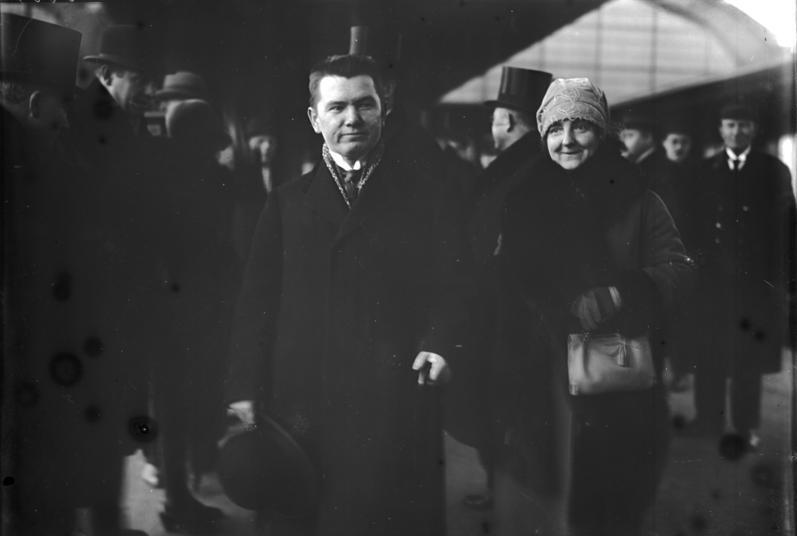
Augistinas Voldemaras and Matilda Voldemarienė in Berlin in 1928

While in Perm, Voldemaras taught Roman history, Greek, Latin, and English at what would become Perm State University. After his stint in the government, he returned to academia in 1920, teaching courses and eventually joining the University of Lithuania (now Vytautas Magnus University) in Kaunas. At the university, he served as a professor and the dean of sociological studies. His academic works were highly acclaimed and in 1923-1924, he participated in international scientific congresses on History and Sociology. A polyglot, Voldemaras was familiar with sixteen different languages and wrote academic works in Lithuanian and French.

In 1919, Voldemaras met Matilda Voldemarienė (née Delahay). While Voldemaras always introduced her as his wife, the status of their relationship was not completely clear and generated some amount of controversy in Lithuania, particularly when the couple visited the Vatican in 1927. Voldemaras's political opponents, the Christian Democrats, alleged in the Lithuanian press that the couple were living together outside marriage, but the issue was not pressed by the Holy See and the couple received blessings from the Pope. In 1929, the couple acted as the godparents to three-year-old Valdas Adamkus, who would later become the President of Lithuania. Nevertheless, Voldemaras was considered a womanizer and was known to have had several high-profile affairs during the years.

== Books ==
- Национальная борьба в Великом Княжестве Литовском в XV и XVI веках (National struggle in the Grand Duchy of Lithuania in the 15th and 16th centuries), 1910. Archive.org
- Lithuanie et Pologne (Lithuania and Poland), 1920. Archive.org
- Les Relations Russo-Polono-Lithuaniennes (Russian-Polish-Lithuanian relations), 1920. Archive.org
- La Lithuanie et ses problèmes, Tome 1, Lithuanie et Allemagne (Lithuania and its problems, Volume 1, Lithuania and Germany), 1933. One volume only. Archive.org
- Raštai: 90 metų sukakčiai paminėti (Writings: 90th Anniversary Celebration), 1973. Archive.org
- Raštai: 100 metų gimimo sukakčiai paminėti (Writings: To commemorate the 100th anniversary of birth), 1983. Archive.org

Government offices
Preceded by none	Prime Minister of Lithuania; 11 November 1918 – 26 December 1918	Succeeded by Mykolas Sleževičius
Preceded by Mykolas Sleževičius	Prime Minister of Lithuania; 17 December 1926 – 23 September 1929	Succeeded by Juozas Tūbelis
