= Dzisna =

Town in Vitebsk Region, Belarus

Dzisna Дзісна (Belarusian) Дисна (Russian)
- Town
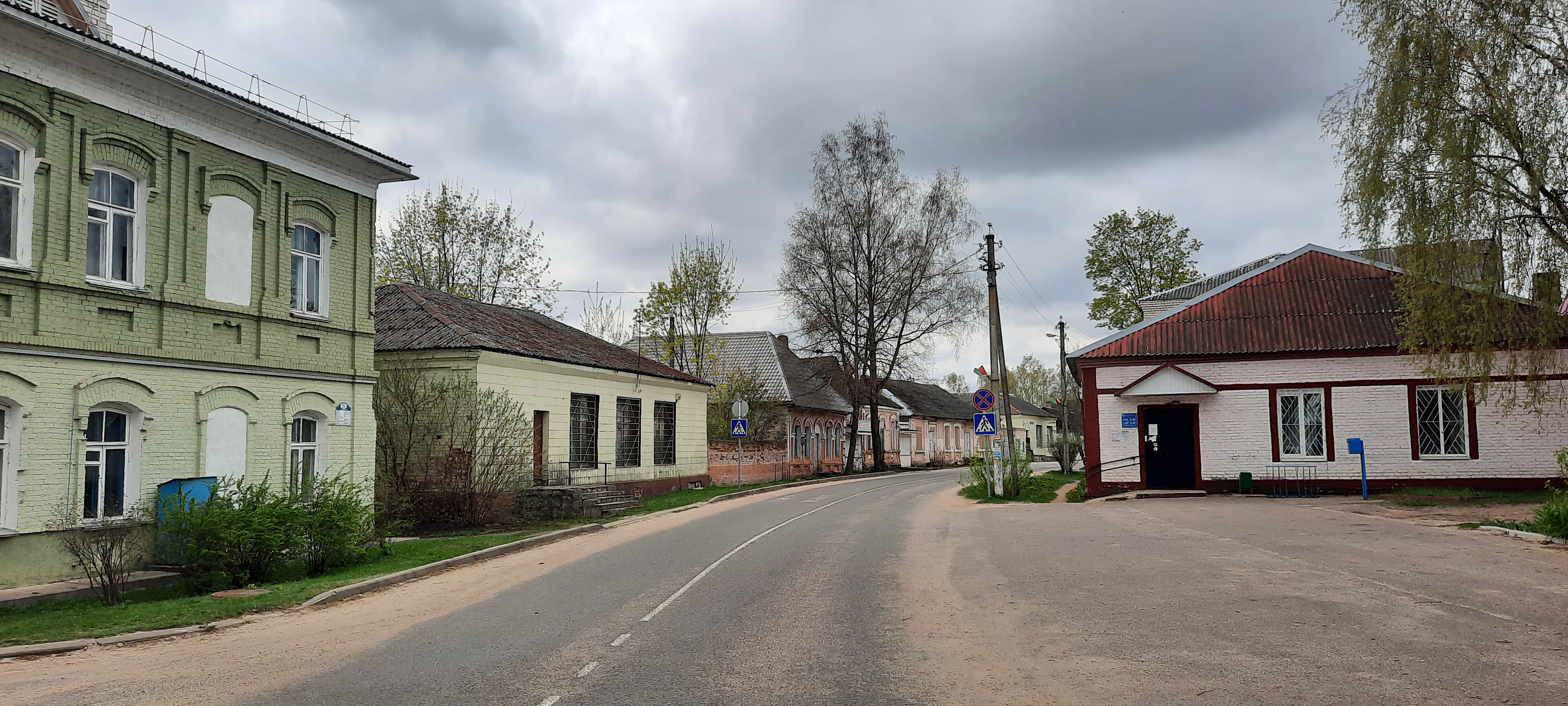

- Flag Coat of arms

- Location within Belarus
- Coordinates: 55°34′N 28°13′E
- Country: Belarus
- Region: Vitebsk Region
- District: Miory District
- First mentioned: 1462

Population (2025)
  - Total: 1,368
- Time zone: UTC+3 (MSK)
- Postal code: 211950
- Area code: +375 2152
- License plate: 2

Dzisna (Belarusian: Дзісна; Russian: Дисна, romanized: Disna; Polish: Dzisna) is a town in Miory District, Vitebsk Region, in northern Belarus. It is located on the left bank of the Daugava River, near the confluence of the Dysna. Dzisna is located 133 kilometres (83 mi) northwest of Vitebsk. In 2017, its population was 1,500. As of 2025, it has a population of 1,368, which makes Dzisna the smallest settlement that is recognized as a town in Belarus.

== History ==
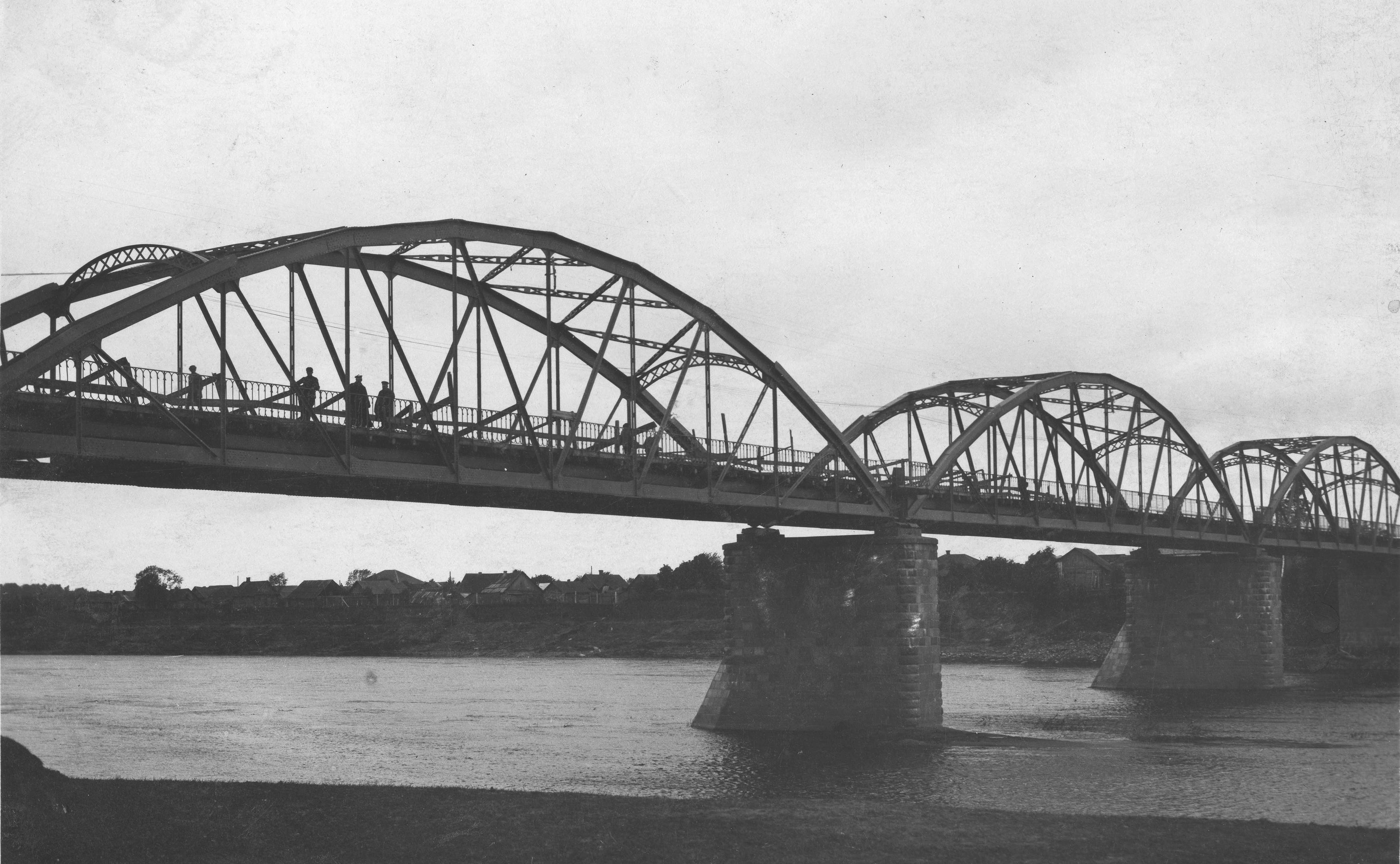
Dzisna Bridge in 1931

The town was founded as a fortress in the 10th to 11th centuries by the Polotsk Krivichs.

Within the Grand Duchy of Lithuania, Dzisna was part of Połock Voivodeship. The town received its coat of arms in 1567, and in 1569, the king of Poland and grand duke of Lithuania, Sigismund II Augustus, granted Dzisna Magdeburg city rights. It was a royal city of Lithuania. In 1793, Dzisna was acquired by the Russian Empire as a result of the Second Partition of Poland.

From 1921 until 1939, Dzisna was part of the Second Polish Republic. In the 1921 census, 49.4% of the population declared Polish nationality, 37.3% declared Jewish nationality, and 11.7% declared Belarusian nationality. On the eve of World War II, the town likely had a Jewish population of more than 4,500.

=== World War II ===
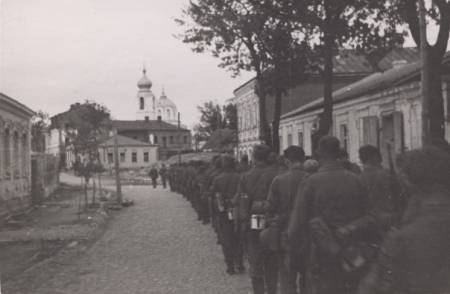
Dzisna in 1941

In September 1939, the town was occupied by the Red Army and, on 14 November 1939, incorporated into the Byelorussian SSR. In the days following the German invasion of the Soviet Union on 22 June 1941, about half of the Jewish population fled to the east. From 3 July 1941, Dzisna was occupied by Nazi Germany. In the fall of 1941, the Germans established a civil administration and the town became the administrative center of one of the nine raions in Gebiet Glebokie, which was headed by Gebietskommissar Paul Hachmann. The town was administered as part of the Generalbezirk Weißruthenien of Reichskommissariat Ostland.

A squad of Feldgendarmerie arrived in Dzisna and took control of the local police, which then became known as the Schutzmannschaft. The head of the police in Dzisna was a Pole by the name of Swiniarski, and his deputy was Alfons Bielski. The first Aktion took place on 28 March 1942, when 30 Jews were shot in what was reportedly a reprisal for the death of the son of the Gebietskommissar. On the night of 14–15 June, a small Sicherheitspolizei squad, with the help of reinforcements, surrounded the ghetto in Dzisna, which had 2,181 inhabitants according to German records. As they entered the ghetto, some of the Jews resisted, with a few hundred able to flee to the forest, although many were later found by police or turned in. Others who were taken alive were shot in two mass graves near the ghetto. The ghetto was finally liquidated in the summer of 1943. After 1944, Dzisna remained part of the Soviet Union until 1991.

== Bibliography ==
- Megargee, Geoffrey P.; Dean, Martin (4 May 2012). The United States Holocaust Memorial Museum Encyclopedia of Camps and Ghettos, 1933–1945: Volume II: Ghettos in German-Occupied Eastern Europe. Indiana University Press. ISBN 978-0-253-00202-0.
