= Rimaldiškė =

- Village
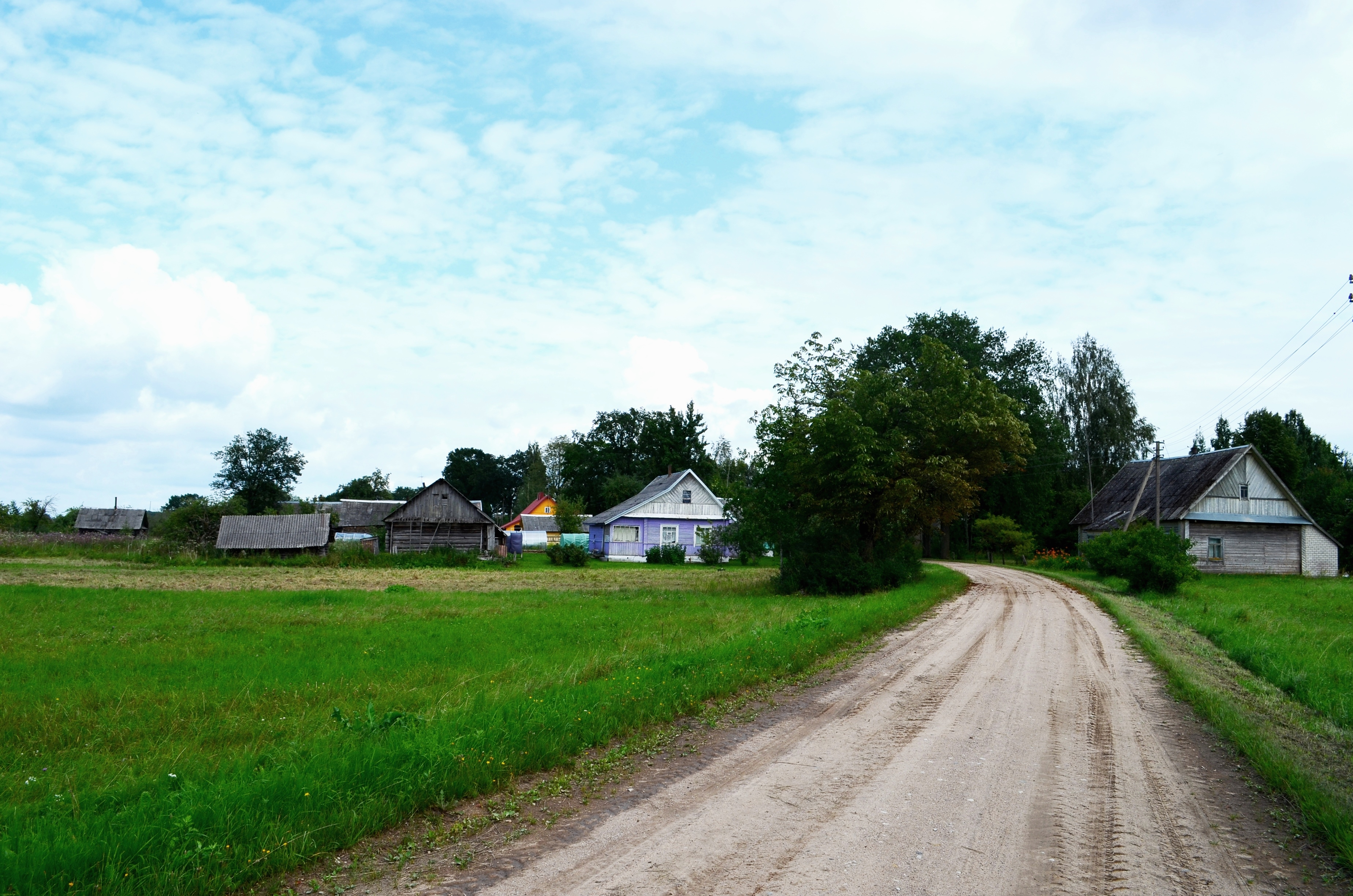

- Location in Lithuania
- Coordinates: 55°16′52″N 26°47′35″E
- Country: Lithuania
- County: Utena County
- Municipality: Ignalina district municipality
- Eldership: Didžiasalis eldership

Population (2011)
  - Total: 18
- Time zone: UTC+2 (EET)
  - Summer (DST): UTC+3 (EEST)

Rimaldiškė is a village in the eastern part of Ignalina district in Lithuania. It is located 2 kilometres east of Lazinkos village near the Birvėta river. The Belarus–Lithuania border is to the east of the village. Together with the nearby Vosiūnai village, it is the easternmost Lithuanian village. According to the 2011 census, it had 18 residents. The village has a chapel.
