= Kančioginas =

- Village
- Location in Lithuania
- Coordinates: 55°13′52″N 26°20′35″E
- Country: Lithuania
- County: Utena County
- Municipality: Ignalina district municipality
- Eldership: Kančioginas eldership

Population (2011)
  - Total: 52
- Time zone: UTC+2 (EET)
  - Summer (DST): UTC+3 (EEST)

Kančioginas − village in Lithuania, Ignalina District Municipality, Ignalina part of south, Sirvėta Regional Park edge, Utena County. 5 kilometres northwest of Ceikiniai village. Peculiar planned rural structure, valuable folk architectural complex.

== Nature and Geography ==
Western village stream flows Kančiogina, southwest of the lake lies there Kančioginas lake.
