= Dysna =

River in Belarus and Lithuania

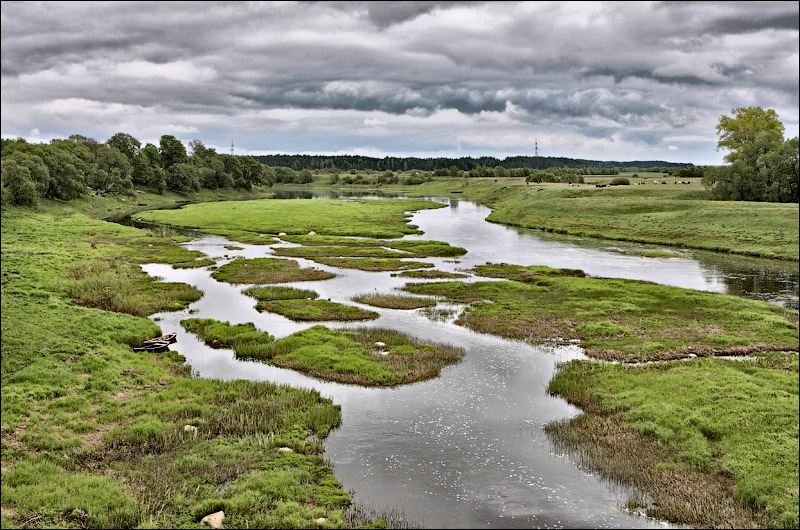
- The Dysna in Belarus, near Dzisna town

Location
- Country: Lithuania, Belarus

Physical characteristics
- Source
  - location: Ignalina district municipality
- Mouth: Daugava
  - coordinates: 55.565°N 28.2283°E
- Length: 176 km (109 mi)
- Basin size: 8,193 km^{2} (3,163 sq mi)
- Discharge
  - average: 3.59 m^{3}/s (127 cu ft/s)

Basin features
- Progression: Daugava→ Baltic Sea
- Tributaries
  - left: Janka
  - right: Birvėta, Avuta

The Dysna (Belarusian: Дзісна, romanized: Dzisna; Russian: Дисна, romanized: Disna) is a river that flows through Lithuania and Belarus into the Daugava River near the town of Dzisna.

The river originates from Lake Parsvėtas, near Dūkštas, Ignalina district municipality. It flows through Lake Dysnai and Lake Dysnykštis. Near Kačergiškės it turns east and for 39 km flows along the Lithuanian-Belarusian border. The length of the Dysna in Lithuania is 17 km. One of the lakes in the basin area is Lake Drūkšiai that used to support the now decommissioned Ignalina Nuclear Power Plant.

The Dysna's largest tributaries are the Birvėta, Golbica, Janka, Berezovka, and Mnuta.
