= Miory district =

District of Vitebsk region, Belarus

Miory district Міёрскі раён (Belarusian)
- District
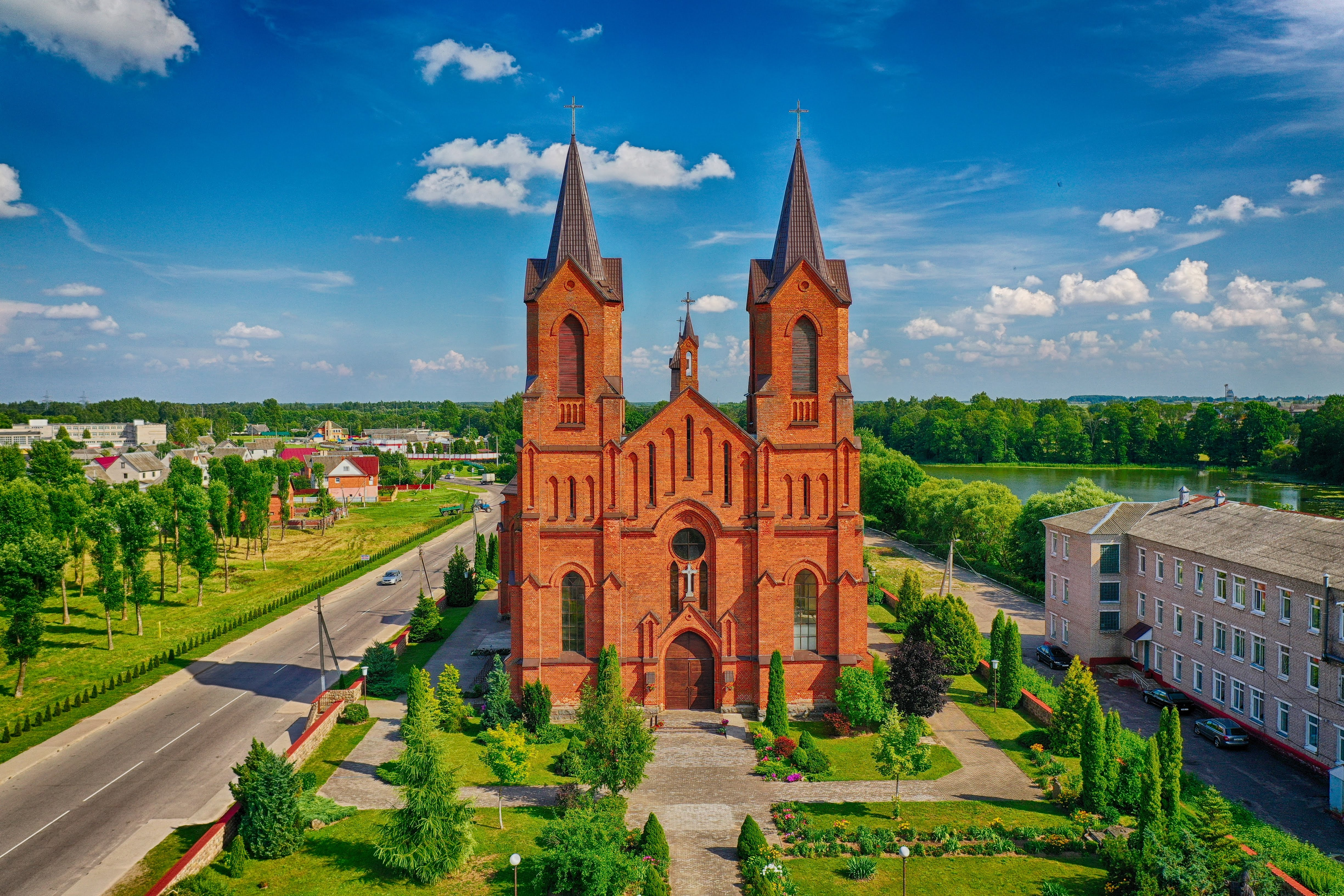

- Flag Coat of arms

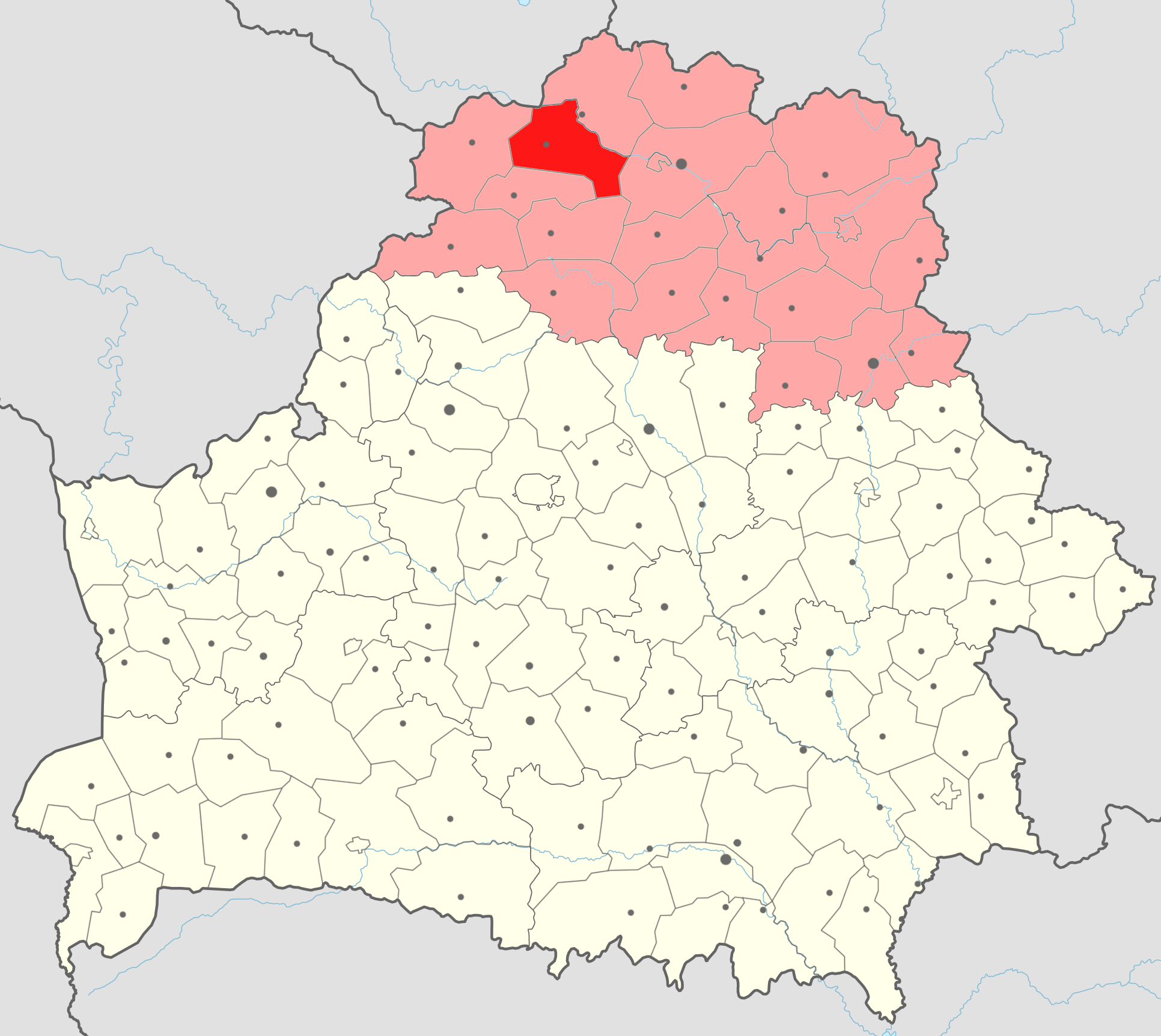
- Coordinates: 55°37′N 27°37′E
- Country: Belarus
- Region: Vitebsk region
- Administrative center: Miory

Area
  - Total: 1,786.64 km^{2} (689.83 sq mi)
- Elevation: 136 m (446 ft)

Population (2023)
  - Total: 17,961
  - Density: 10.053/km^{2} (26.037/sq mi)
- Time zone: UTC+3 (MSK)

Miory district (Belarusian: Мёрскі раён; Russian: Миорский район) is a district (raion) of Vitebsk region in Belarus. Its administrative center is Miory.

== Notable residents ==
- Ceslaus Sipovich (1914 – October 4, 1981), bishop of the Belarusian Greek Catholic Church and a notable Belarusian émigré social and religious leader.
