= Aušrininkai =

1910-1938 socialist student organization in Lithuania

- Formation: 1910; 116 years ago
- Dissolved: 1938; 88 years ago
- Purpose: Socialist student activism
- Location: Lithuania

Aušrininkai was a semi-formal socialist student movement in Lithuania that formed around the Aušrinė (morning star) magazine. Established in 1910, it was the first youth organization in Lithuania.

Student groups formed in various schools that organized discussions, lectures, literature exchanges, etc. These groups did not have any central leadership and acted mostly on their own based on principles outlined in Aušrinė. Initially a non-political magazine, established with a long-term aim of developing the new generation of intelligentsia, it soon stated propagating ideas of the Russian Narodniks and Socialist Revolutionary Party. During World War I, the schools and students evacuated to Russia, mainly Voronezh, and the organization became a lot more political. However, Marxism was rejected in favor of individualism. Upon return to Lithuania in 1918, the organization was able to work legally for a few years. The Lithuanian government considered communists dangerous to its national security and began repressing communist and socialist organizations, including Aušrininkai. In November 1923, political organizations were banned from schools and the organization itself was banned a few months after the coup d'état of December 1926. It survived as a student group at University of Lithuania. Aušrininkai were becoming more radical, both in ideology and actions. Members of Aušrininkai participated in a failed anti-government coup in 1927, attempted to assassinate Prime Minister Augustinas Voldemaras in 1929, and joined the Lithuanian section of the Union of Socialists-Revolutionaries-Maximalists in the early 1930s. After arrests of several leaders and other members in 1933–1934, the organization diminished and was officially dissolved in 1938.

During its history, many prominent Lithuanians were members of Aušrininkai, including Stasys Šilingas, Petras Klimas, Julius Janonis, Butkų Juzė, Balys Sruoga, Kazys Boruta, Pranas Čepėnas.

== History ==
=== Russian Empire ===
In January 1910, Lietuvos žinios began publishing Aušrinė, a supplement geared towards youth. Informal student groups began organizing in various schools across Lithuania (then part of the Russian Empire) that followed the ideology of Aušrinė. Soon other student groups formed around the Catholic Ateitis. The two groups split the student population and often competed with each other. All of these groups were illegal as no student organizations were allowed by the Tsarist regime. Aušrininkai organized social gatherings and meetings to discuss ideas, shared books and periodicals, prepared research papers on Lithuanian or current topics (e.g. What is a Constitution? or Life and Teachings of Charles Darwin), collected folklore, even published their own newsletters. Such groups were active in Marijampolė, Vilkaviškis, Ukmergė, Šiauliai (including member Julius Janonis), Telšiai (led by Butkų Juzė), Vilnius, Panevėžys (from 1913, led by Balys Sruoga). The groups did not have any central leadership and acted mostly on their own based on principles outlined in Aušrinė.

During World War I, most Lithuanian schools evacuated to Voronezh where students reestablished Aušrininkai groups. By end of 1915, they numbered seven groups with 130 students. There was also a unified Voronezh board, chaired by Juozas Lukoševičius. In 1917, Aušrininkai had a choir, string orchestra, and theater group. A small group, which included Julius Janonis and Stasys Brašiškis and became known as visuomenininkai, advocated a more violent revolution and splintered off from the main group in December 1915. Other, smaller groups organized in Moscow, Saint Petersburg, Bogoroditsk (Dotnuva Agricultural School), Borovichi (Panevėžys School), Taganrog (Jelgava Gymnasium), Sorochinsk (Veiveriai Teachers' Seminary), Yaroslavl (Marijampolė Gymnasium), and elsewhere. In May 1917, Aušrininkai organized a conference which debated the ideology and decided to revive Aušrinė. Students began returning to Lithuania after the Act of Independence of Lithuania in February 1918 and a mass repatriation was organized in June 1918.

=== Independent Lithuania ===
==== Groups and activities ====
Back in Lithuania, Marijampolė Realgymnasium, established by Andrius Bulota, became the most active center of Aušrininkai. Many teachers were leftists and supported the organization. In other schools Aušrininkai faced difficulties as they were met with resistance from school administration, teachers, parents, and local priests. Nevertheless, at different times, students groups existed in Panevėžys, Alytus, Biržai, Telšiai, Kupiškis, Šiauliai, Tauragė, Kaunas, Kėdainiai, Rokiškis, and elsewhere. The groups celebrated May 1, the International Workers' Day, organized lectures, held discussions, performed plays, shared publications, published their own newsletters, etc. The groups were still decentralized, but annual conferences were held in Kaunas.

The first conference, held on 7–9 April 1920, was attended by about 350 people. They refined the ideology, adopted new statute, resolved to work not only with school students but youth in general and to develop ties with other socialist-minded organizations both in Lithuania and abroad. The organization officially adopted legal name of the Organization of Socialist Aušrininkai Students of Lithuania (Lietuvos socialistinės moksleivijos aušrininkų organizacija). Other conferences were held on 28–29 December 1921 (19 delegates), 11–12 April 1922 (25 delegates), 4–5 January 1924, 26–28 June 1925, and 29–31 March 1926. The last two conferences were open to other organizations as well. Other joint events were also held. On 4–16 July 1924, Aušrininkai organized a special expedition to Samogitia during which about 60 people visited different towns (Žemaičių Kalvarija, Telšiai, Plungė, Kretinga) and delivered lectures, performed plays, and organized protests. On 2–4 July 1926, about 100 people attended a meeting of Aušrininkai from Suvalkija in Marijampolė. The last small annual conference was held in April 1927 under police supervision; the organization was banned the same month.

As students graduated from schools they continued studies at the University of Lithuania, established in 1922. In early 1923, the Society of Socialist Students had around 70 members. Aušrininkai did not have their own separate organization and formed one of the most active sections within the society. Due to disagreements, the Society of Socialist Students soon split: social-democrats established Žaizdras Society in 1925 and Aušrininkai separated in January 1926. Autonomy of the university protected them from the government order banning the organization outside the university. Aušrininkai continued to be active and even restarted the publication of Aušrinė in 1931. The organization was becoming more radical and some members, including Kazys Jakubėnas and Pranas Čepėnas, supported the Lithuanian section of the Union of Socialists-Revolutionaries-Maximalists which condoned individual terrorist acts such as assassinations of dignitaries. That led to increased police scrutiny, arrests, and eventual dissolution of the organization in 1938.

==== Government persecution ====
In May 1921, twenty people, including two members of Aušrininkai, were arrested in Marijampolė for organizing anti-government demonstrations for the International Workers' Day. The two students were found not guilty, but the organization continued to irritate the government. Lithuanian police and security agencies closely monitored its activities and considered it more dangerous than the illegal Communist Party of Lithuania. In November 1923, political organizations were banned from schools (the organization was still legal outside of schools). The Marijampolė Realgymnasium was closed down by the government in June 1925. In spring 1926, Lithuanian police shot Kostas Batisas, chairman of the Aušrininkai group in Pilviškiai, when he ran away from the officers. The incident provoked student protests.

In May 1926, the election to the Third Seimas of Lithuania was won by opposition parties that lifted martial law, restored democratic freedoms, and declared a broad amnesty to political prisoners. The new government even intended to allow Aušrininkai in schools. However, in December 1926, Lithuanian military, under the official pretext of preventing an imminent Bolshevik revolt, organized the coup d'état that brought Antanas Smetona to power. The new regime clamped down on leftist organizations and arrested hundreds of communists and socialists, including Aušrininkai members. The organization was outlawed in April 1927, though the group at Lithuania University continued to exist. Several Aušrininkai members participated in the Tauragė Revolt in September 1927, and that led to the constant and systematic surveillance by the police.

In May 1929, three members of Aušrininkai attempted an assassination of Prime Minister Augustinas Voldemaras. Two members escaped, but the third, Aleksandras Vosylius, was arrested and received the death penalty. Arrests of other members of Aušrininkai followed. In March 1933, the police searched apartments of over a dozen members of Aušrininkai on suspicions that they were also members of the Lithuanian section of the Union of Socialists-Revolutionaries-Maximalists. Chairman Kazys Jakubėnas was arrested and sentenced to 18 months in prison. Other members were arrested as well and that lead to decline of the organization. In spring 1936, it only had 12 members. It did not renew its registration for 1937 and the university rector officially dissolved it on 16 February 1938.

== Aušrinė ==
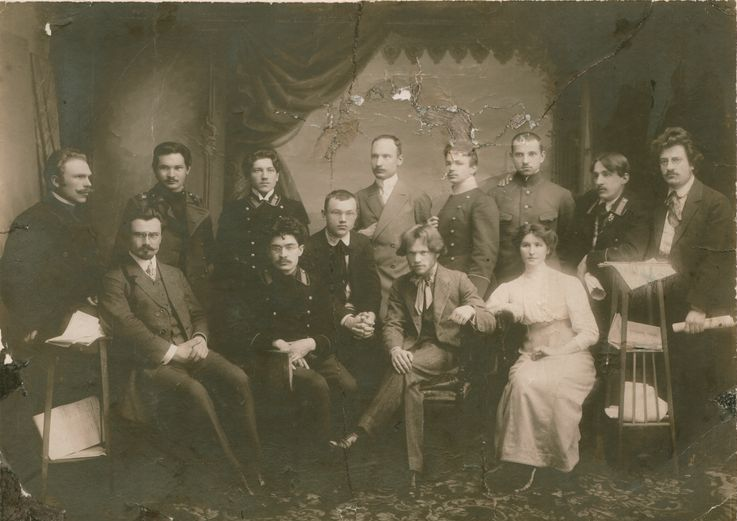
Members of Aušrinė editorial staff in 1912

The first issue of Aušrinė, edited by Stasys Šilingas, was published on 30 January 1910 as a free supplement to Lietuvos žinios. Initiated by Lithuanian students in Moscow, the magazine was published by Felicija Bortkevičienė in Vilnius. Its initial goal was to encourage students to become more active in public life with a long-term aim of developing the new generation of intelligentsia. Its byline was free supplement of literature and science. Writers contributing their works included Julius Janonis, Kazys Binkis, Balys Sruoga, Antanas Vienuolis. It also published supplements Vasaros darbai (Works of Summer) in 1910–1912 with samples of folklore collected by students. In 1914, its circulation was 3,250 copies. The publication was discontinued after 31 issues in 1914 due to World War I. The magazine was revived for five issues in Voronezh in 1917. At the time, its byline was magazine for progressive students. Its five-member editorial board included Balys Sruoga, Juozas Žiugžda, and Valerija Čiurlionytė (sister of Mikalojus Konstantinas Čiurlionis).

Aušrinė, as the magazine for socialist students, was revived again in Marijampolė in December 1919. Due to financial difficulties and run-ins with the censors, the magazine was published irregularly. The publication ceased in December 1926 after the coup d'état of December 1926. Aušrinė appeared again in March 1931 as the magazine of free socialist thought. Its circulation was about 3,000 copies. Published by students at the University of Lithuania, it focused on the ideology as well as the theoretical and practical issues of socialism. After arrests of several leaders of Aušrininkai in March 1933, the publication was discontinued for good.

From 1925, Aušrininkai published separate books and brochures. Brochures were printed on some basic theoretical questions such as The Fundamentals of Socialist Worldview or The Road to Socialism. Books included non-fiction works on Benoît Malon and Peter Kropotkin (both in 1928) and the tensions that later led to the Spanish Civil War (1933); translations of works by authors like Oscar Wilde (The Soul of Man under Socialism in 1928), Panait Istrati (The Thistles of the Bărăgan in 1932), Isadora Duncan (My Life in 1932–1933); fiction works by such Lithuanian authors as Vincas Kudirka (satire Cenzūros klausimas in 1927), Kazys Jakubėnas (collection of poems Tegyvuoja gyvas gyvenimas in 1931), Vytautas Montvila (collection of poems Naktys be nakvynės in 1933).

=== Editors ===
Editors of Aušrinė were:

- Stasys Šilingas, 1910
- Petras Klimas, 1911
- Steponė Mošinskaitė, 1911–1913
- Žemaitė (responsible editor), (Note: "Responsible editors" were listed in the official records for the purposes of exploiting loopholes in the censorship law. They were often not involved in the actual editing process.) 1913–1914
- Mečys Markauskas, 1917
- Adolfas Renkė, 1920–1921
- Jonas Baronas (resp. ed.), 1922
- Motiejus Strimaitis (resp. ed.) [actually, Kazys Boruta], 1923–1925, 1926
- Kazys Bubnys (resp. ed.), 1925–1926
- Leonas Gruodis (resp. ed.), 1926
- Jonas Kruopas (resp. ed.), 1931
- Juozas Klimavičius (resp. ed.) [actually, Kazys Boruta], 1932–1933

== Ideology ==
Initially, Aušrinė reflected various political views. However, Pranas Dovydaitis left Aušrinė and joined Catholic Ateitis in late 1910. Thus, the magazine advocated freethought and individualism, and relationship between Aušrininkai and Catholic organizations were tense or adversarial for its entire existence. Albinas Iešmanta raised the fundamental question: should the youth follow the examples of Western capitalism or of Russian socialist revolution. After debates, it was decided to follow the example of Russian Narodniks and Socialist Revolutionary Party. Aušrinė urged students to "build bridges" between the intelligentsia and the people, and published suggestions for specific tasks that students could undertake during their summer vacations. The students were the agitators and educators. The magazine also promoted personal abstinence from alcoholic beverages and tobacco products as well as encouraged sports and physical activities.

The organization became a lot more political during World War I. The ideology was further refined in 1917 and combined individualism (including freedom of religion), socialism, democratism, and nationalism. In 1920, democratism was dropped in favor of revolutionary socialism, but Marxism was rejected in favor of individualism. The organization adopted a red flag that bore slogans Long live socialism! and Towards human liberty!. Aušrininkai were initially lukewarm and then increasingly critical towards the Lithuanian Popular Peasants' Union and the Social Democratic Party of Lithuania. After the coup d'état in 1926, political opposition became moribund and Aušrininkai became more radical. They were influenced by Russian communists, German anarchists, Italian fascists, Spanish anarcho-syndicalists. For example, they published and propagated ideas of Peter Kropotkin on mutual aid and anarcho-communism. Aušrinė was generally critical towards the Soviet Union and particularly its repressions of the opposition. Therefore, in the Lithuanian SSR, members of Aušrininkai were considered not reliable and some were persecuted. For example, writer Kazys Boruta was sentenced to five years in prison while writer Kazys Jakubėnas was tried and later found dead under mysterious circumstances.

Already in July 1910, Aušrinė noted that very few women were contributing to the magazine. That provoked several responses from women who described various attitudes towards "traditional women roles" and stereotypes about women students in their families and society in general (for example, widespread stereotype that women at universities were searching for husbands instead of trying to learn), and at the same time encouraged other women to become more active. A more theoretical study was prepared by Petras Klimas in 1913 based on works of Clara Zetkin, Alexandra Kollontai, and Ellen Key. He did not support feminism (as in equal rights of men and women) but viewed women's movement as a component of the larger socialist movement. During World War I, the idea of equal rights became commonly accepted and the issue was rarely discussed in Aušrinė. Instead, more women joined the movement and took official posts.

== Bibliography ==
- Andrijauskaitė, Ugnė Marija (2013). Aušrininkų organizacija 1910-1938 m. (PDF) (Master's thesis) (in Lithuanian). Kaunas: Vytautas Magnus University.
- Biržiška, Vaclovas, ed. (1953). "Aušrininkai". Lietuvių enciklopedija (in Lithuanian). Vol. I. Boston: Lietuvių enciklopedijos leidykla. OCLC 14547758.
- Burneikienė, Genovaitė (1997). "Aušrinė" (PDF). In Laimonas Tapinas; et al. (eds.). Žurnalistikos enciklopedija (in Lithuanian). Vilnius: Pradai. ISBN 9986-776-62-7.
- Čyvas, Tomas (2008-05-24). "Mirties bausme nepiktnaudžiavusi diktatūra" (in Lithuanian). Shortened version published by Veidas.
- Kulikauskas, Gediminas (2002). "1926 m. valstybės perversmas". Gimtoji istorija. Nuo 7 iki 12 klasės (in Lithuanian). Vilnius: Elektroninės leidybos namai. ISBN 9986-9216-9-4.
- Raškauskas, Kęstutis (2013). "Rašytojas ir politika: Kazio Borutos atvejis (1924–1935)". Darbai ir dienos (in Lithuanian). 59: 189–272. doi:10.7220/2335-8769.59.7. hdl:20.500.12259/33004. ISSN 1392-0588. S2CID 151560523.
- Urbonas, Vytas (2002-08-14). "Aušrinė". Visuotinė lietuvių enciklopedija (in Lithuanian). Mokslo ir enciklopedijų leidybos centras.
