= Petronėlė Lastienė =

Lithuanian teacher and university professor

- Born: Petronėlė Sirutytė; 9 August 1897; Dalginė, Suwałki Governorate, Congress Poland
- Died: 29 November 1981 (aged 84); Kaunas, Lithuanian SSR
- Education: Poltoratskaya's Higher Courses for Women; University of Kaunas
- Occupations: Teacher, university lecturer
- Employer: Kaunas Polytechnic Institute
- Spouse: Adomas Lastas
- Awards: Righteous Among the Nations

Petronėlė Lastienė née Sirutytė (9 August 1897 – 29 November 1981) was a Lithuanian teacher and university professor. She was recognized as one of the Righteous Among the Nations for rescuing Jewish children from the Kaunas Ghetto during the Holocaust.

During World War I, Lastienė worked as a nurse with the 10th Army. During the interwar period, she worked as a teacher and edited a journal for girl scouts. In 1946, she was arrested for an anti-Soviet memorandum addressed to Western powers and sentenced to eight years in the Gulag. She returned to Lithuania in 1953 and was able to get a job teaching Russian language at the Kaunas Polytechnic Institute until her retirement in 1963.

== Biography ==
=== Early life and education ===
Lastienė was born on 9 August 1897 in Dalginė (in present-day Marijampolė Municipality) of the Suwałki Governorate. The same year, her father was arrested and deported to Siberia for participating in the Sietynas organization which smuggled the banned Lithuanian publications from East Prussia. He returned to Lithuania only after the press ban was lifted in 1905. She was the youngest of eight children. She was a childhood friend with Ona Matulaitytė, the future wife of Aleksandras Stulginskis.

Lastienė attended a private girls' gymnasium established by Ksenija Breverniūtė in Marijampolė. The classes were held in Russian, but the school had a class on the Lithuanian language which was taught by Petras Kriaučiūnas. At school, she joined the Aušrininkai youth society and performed in its musical and theatrical events.

After the start of World War I, she complete nursing courses. From July 1915 to September 1916, she was a nurse with the 10th Army in present-day Belarus. In Moscow, she completed four semesters at the history and philology section of the Poltoratskaya's Higher Courses for Women.

=== Teacher ===
In 1918, she returned to Lithuania and became a teacher of history, geography, and Russian language at Marijampolė Realgymnasium established by attorney Andrius Bulota. She married poet Adomas Lastas. They both participated in amateur theater performances staged by the People's Theater organized by Albinas Iešmanta.

In 1923, she moved to Kaunas where she taught at a gymnasium for adults while studying at the Faculty of Humanities of the University of Kaunas. At the same time, she operated a small private school for 10–12 children, preparing them for entrance exams into gymnasiums. Her private students included future diplomat Stasys Lozoraitis Jr. and archaeologist Rimutė Jablonskytė-Rimantienė. From 1929 to 1940, she was an editor of Vadovė journal for girl scout leaders. In 1938, she became a teacher of history at Kaunas 5th Gymnasium where she was promoted to headmistress after the Soviet occupation of Lithuania.

=== World War II and Gulag prisoner ===
Both of her brothers were deported by the Soviets during the June deportation in 1941; both of them died in exile. During the Nazi occupation of Lithuania, Lastienė hid several Jews, including her former student Tamara Lazerson, from Nazi persecution. Yad Vashem recognized her as one of the Righteous Among the Nations in 2000. In summer 1944, she organized a Red Cross committee which operated a soup kitchen in Kaunas. Three of her sisters (and her brother-in-law Pranas Čepėnas) retreated to Germany ahead of the advancing Red Army and ended up in the United States, Australia, and Canada.

After the return of the Soviet regime in August 1944, Lastienė briefly taught at the University of Kaunas and organized courses for workers and farmers. Together with Tadas Petkevičius and three others, she authored a memorandum addressed to Western powers on the Soviet occupation and worked with Petras Klimas to have it translated to French and smuggled abroad. For this, she was arrested in April 1946, convicted of counter-revolutionary activities under Article 58 of the Soviet Penal Code, and sentenced to eight years in the Gulag and five years in forced settlements. She was sent to the Uhtizhemlag in the Komi ASSR where she worked as a nurse at the camp's hospital.

=== University lecturer ===
She returned to Lithuania in 1953, after the death of Joseph Stalin. She lived in an apartment with dentist Julija Biliūnienė, widow of writer Jonas Biliūnas. As a former political prisoner, she faced difficulties in finding employment, but her former student and then rector of Kaunas Polytechnic Institute Kazimieras Baršauskas managed to get permission from the First Secretary Antanas Sniečkus to employ her as a professor. She was prohibited from teaching history and instead taught the Russian language. She worked at the institute from autumn 1955 until retirement in 1963. Lastienė corresponded with her brother-in-law historian Pranas Čepėnas and assisted him in collecting data for the 35-volume Lietuvių enciklopedija published in Boston. Vilnius University Library stores a personal collection of her documents (Fond 161).

Lastienė died on 29 November 1981 and was buried in Liudvinavas cemetery next to her parents.

== Translated works ==
Lastienė also translated and published several fiction works: the play Inno del primo maggio by Pietro Gori (1920), the comedy The Wood Demon by Anton Chekhov (1921), the play Autumn Violin by Ilya Surguchov (1922), and the novel Nomads of the North by James Oliver Curwood (1937). She also translated two history textbooks, History of the Middle Ages (1923) and History of the Modern Ages (1925) by Robert Wipper.
