= Liudvinavas Eldership =

Liudvinavas Eldership Liudvinavo seniūnija
- Eldership
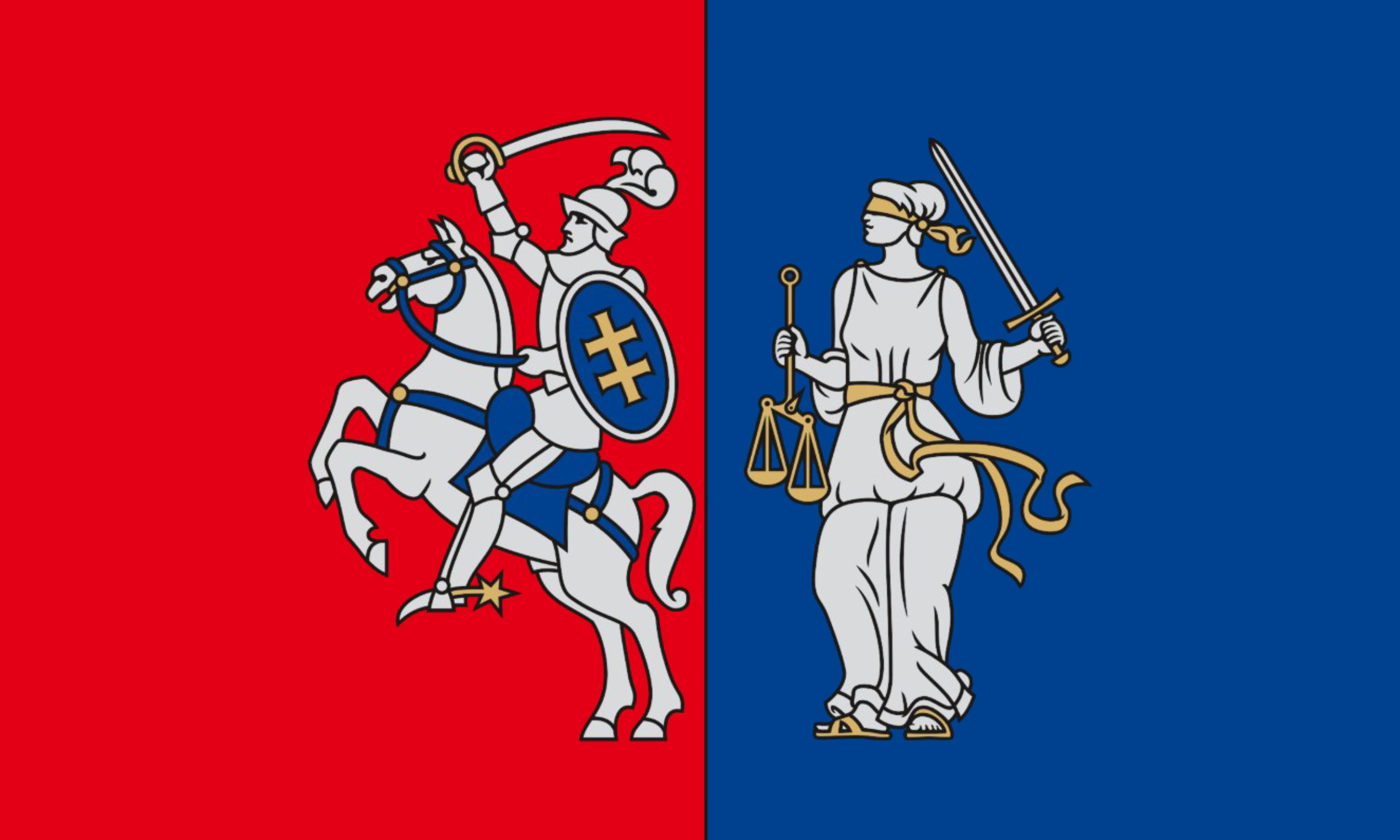
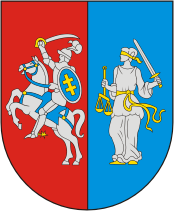
- Flag Coat of arms

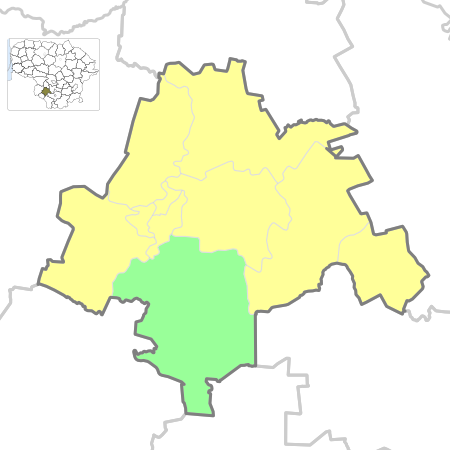
- Location of Liudvinavas Eldership
- Country: Lithuania
- Ethnographic region: Suvalkija
- County: Marijampolė County
- Municipality: Marijampolė Municipality
- Administrative centre: Liudvinavas

Government
  - Elder (Seniūnas): Regina Pakrosnevičienė

Area
  - Total: 168 km^{2} (65 sq mi)

Population
  - Total: 5,190
  - Density: 30.9/km^{2} (80.0/sq mi)
- Time zone: UTC+2 (EET)
  - Summer (DST): UTC+3 (EEST)
- Website: https://www.marijampole.lt/kontaktai/liudvinavo-seniunija/d38

Liudvinavas eldership (Lithuanian: Liudvinavo seniūnija) is a unit of territorial administration and local government (seniūnija) in the southern part of Marijampolė County and Marijampolė Municipality. Eldership borders Lazdijai, Kalvarija and Alytus municipalities.

Its administrative seat is the town of Liudvinavas. Eldership has 55 towns and settlements and is divided into 11 sub-elderships (seniūnaitija).

The eldership contains three major settlements: Želsva, 7 km (4.3 mi) south-east of Liudvinavas, Netičkampis, 3 km (1.8 mi) north of Liudvinavas, and Padovinys, 6.6 km (4.1 mi) east of Liudvinavas.

== Geography ==
The Šešupė, Sūduonia and Dovinė rivers flow in the territory of the eldership. The largest lake in the eldership is Žaltytis (380 ha), which has been designated as an ornithological reserve. The Bukta Forest and the Dalginė Botanical Reserve are located within the eldership. Žaltytis Lake and Bukta Forest are protected by UNESCO. These areas are part of the Žuvintas Biosphere Reserve.
