= Riadino-5 Site =

Paleolithic archaeological site in Russia

Riadino-5
- Type: Settlement
- Periods: Middle to Upper Paleolithic Transition
- Location: Kaliningrad Oblast of Russian Federation
- Region: Central Europe (Šešupė River Valley)

History
- Built: 50 to 44 ka
- Event: Oldest human habitat in the Baltic region

Site notes
- Length: 200 m (660 ft)
- Width: 80 m (260 ft)
- Excavation dates: 2009-2011
- Archaeologists: Olga Druzhinina
- Discovered: 2006

The Riadino-5 Site is an archaeological site located on a terrace within the Šešupė River Valley in the Kaliningrad Oblast of the Russian Federation. Unlike most other sites near this area, the Riadino-5 site is one of the first sites of the Middle to Upper Paleolithic transitional period to have been found in the Baltic region, which includes Lithuania, Latvia, Estonia, and areas of the Russian Federation. Even when compared to other sites of similar age, the Riadino-5 site is still one of the northernmost sites to have been occupied in the Central European region. This makes it one of the oldest sites documenting human habitation, dating back all the way to the Marine Isotope Stage 3, approximately ca 57-26 thousand calendar years ago. The site itself was occupied during the Middle to Upper Paleolithic period within that era between 50 and 44 ka. Upon discovery, the site measured 200 meters by 80 meters. The approximate aging of the site was supported by findings of flint artifacts, using luminescence IRSL dating based on potassium-feldspar sample size and Carbon-14 dating of charcoal and ash layers from the site. At the moment, the exact culture and society of the site occupants has yet to be determined, and is currently undergoing comparative analysis to other similarly dated sites in the vicinity to uncover some answers.

== History of the site ==
=== Geographic location ===
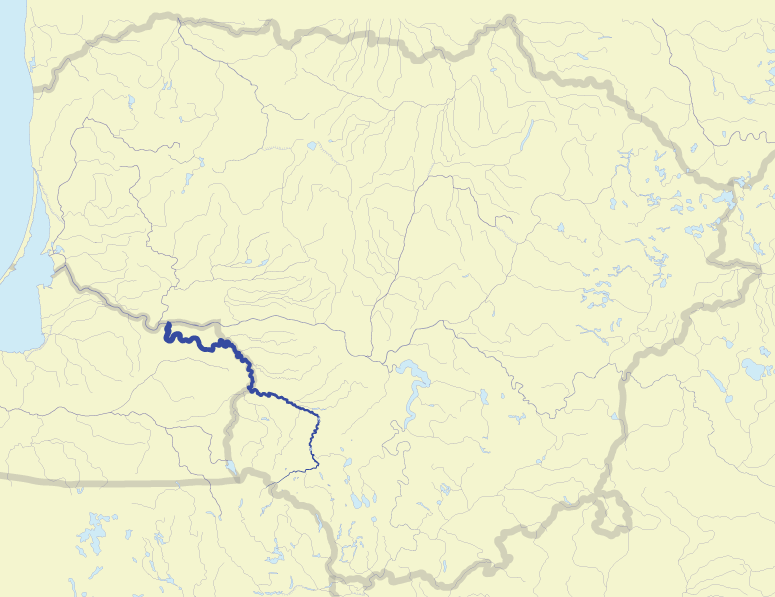
The Šešupė River Valley as viewed from Lithuania

The actual site itself is based around the flow of the Šešupė and Neman Rivers, currently believed to result from runoff of glacially deposited water around the site. The Baltic area in which the site resides has been heavily affected by the Weichselian glaciation of the Marine Isotope Stage 2. During a period without ice, around the Marine Isotope Stage 3 (MIS 3), the average temperature of the region saw an increase over modern temperatures of that same area. These warmer climates allowed for more archaic humans to move into the Baltic region, and occupy sites such as Riadino-5. Over the years, the site has been privy to various forms of erosion that have played key roles in the formation of the site. Wind has blown in to sculpt various dunes as well as ridges of sand, while water erosion gave way to various terraces dating back to the Late Pleistocene era, which provide separation of the site from others. The terraced nature of the site provides some advantages and challenges. While the soil is mostly marshy or peaty, there is a great deal of diversity in foliage and the vegetation that accompanies it. Types of soil include podzolic layers, found in areas with many sand deposits, and alluvial soils that were deposited from the river.

=== Early excavations of the site ===
In 2006, a survey of the terraces in the Šešupė River Valley stumbled upon the remains of the site. The initial site size was determined to be 200 meters by 80 meters. Later in 2009–2011, excavations done by Olga Druzhinina dug up another 28 square meters for further study.

== Archaeological characterization ==
=== Artifacts ===
In terms of tool diversity, end-scrapers, burins, burin end-scrapers, borers, scrapers, knife blades, bladelets, and other unidentifiable tools have been discovered. Most of the tools and artifacts found at the site were made of a high quality gray flint. The source of the flint originates with the river deposits at the terraces, at which Riadino-5 sits. There's a variety of cores that suggested various flaking techniques were used; cores included cone-shaped, one-platform, prismatic, and formless ones. The size of each core is considerably small, meaning they were well worked upon before being discarded. The flintknapping occurred at the settlement itself as opposed to a secondary location, based on the debris of flakes found on site. Additionally, most flint tools were never moved to a secondary site at any point for extensive working either. Flakes range from 2.5 to 4.0 centimetres in size, while bladelets have been found ranging from 0.9 to 1.5 centimetres in width. Evidence of two flintknapping forms are involved: retouch and burin spall. In this instance, retouch involved brute force attack of the dorsal surface of the core stones. The burin, used to engrave objects, was formed by an oblique strike to a burin flake, which created the sharp edge necessary to engrave. The end-scrapers document a wide variety of retouching much like other artifacts, and were combined with burins on blades to form combined tools such as the burin end-scrapers. Since most of the artifacts were not very large, they were likely employed in conjunction with a handle to allow control.

Examples of what Riadino-5 artifacts looked like from similarly dated sites:

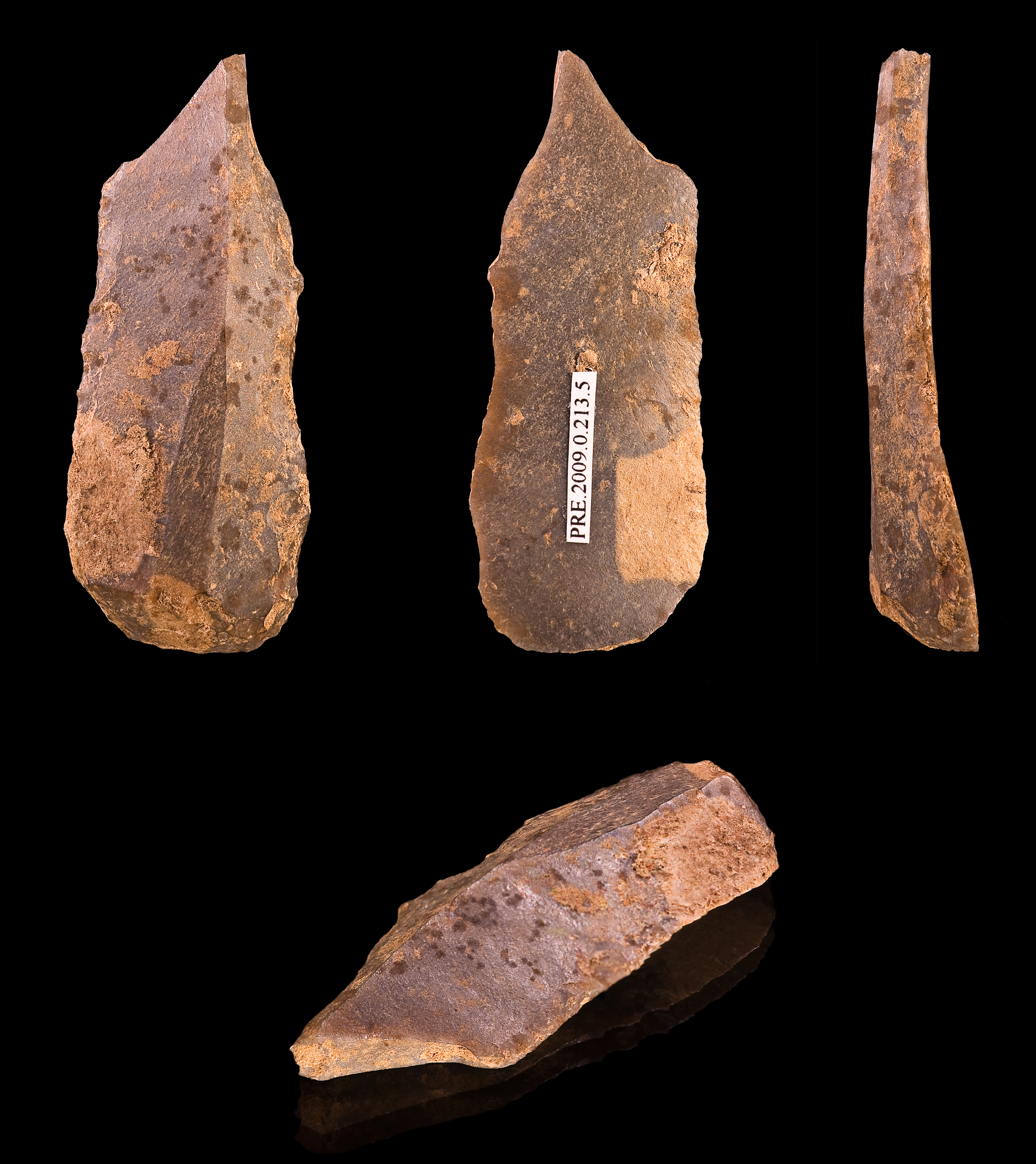
An example of an Upper Paleolithic period burin.

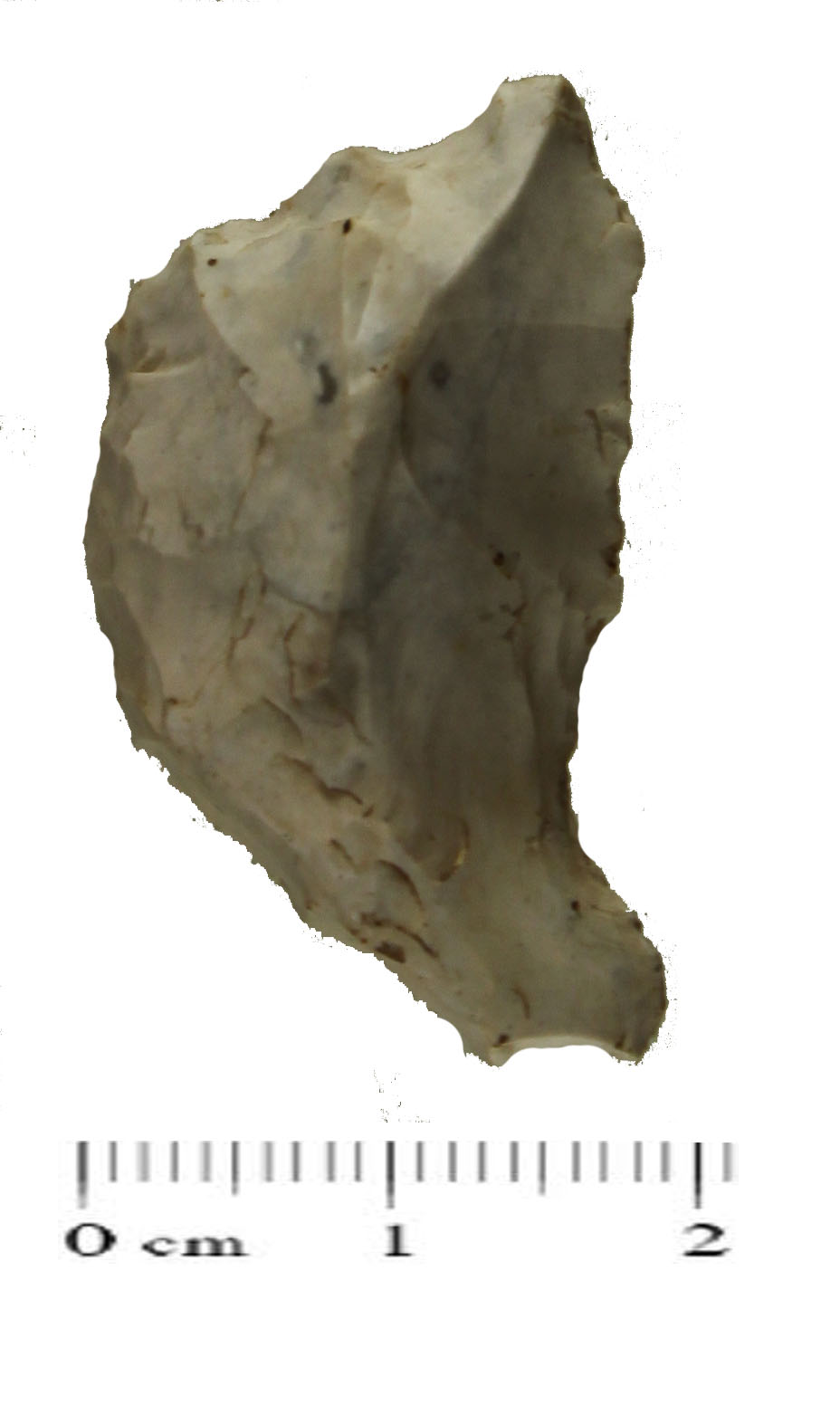
An example of a Paleolithic end-scraper.

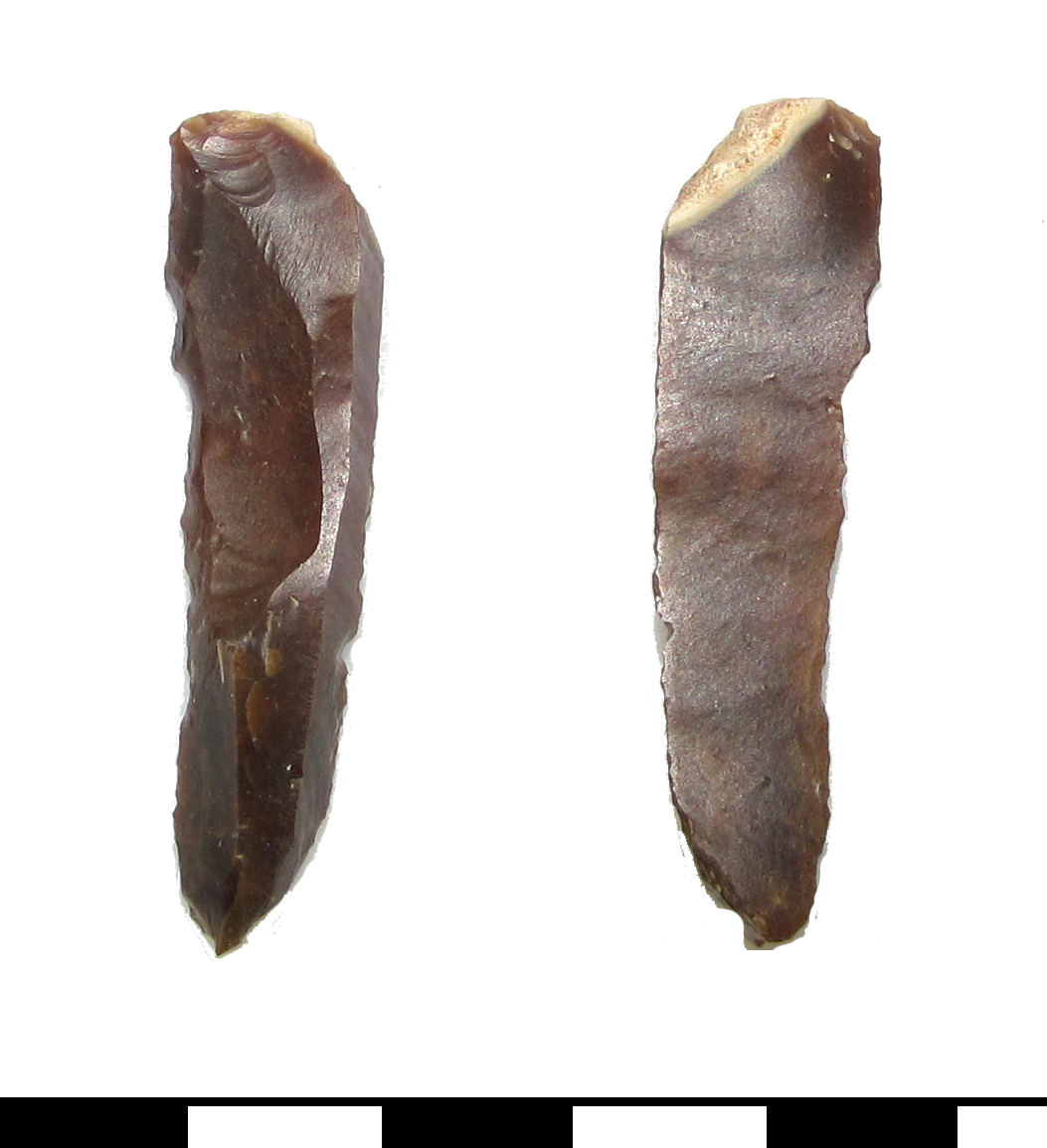
An Upper Paleolithic example of a bladelet.

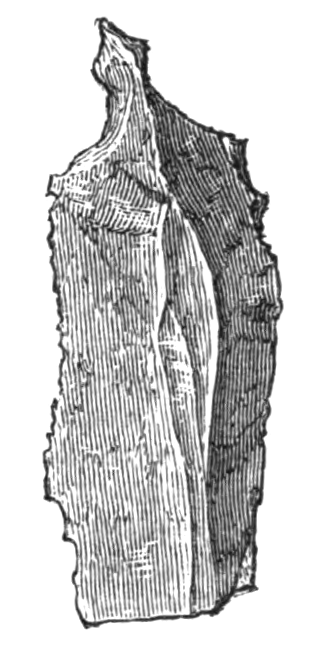
An example of a crude flint borer from the Tertiary Period.

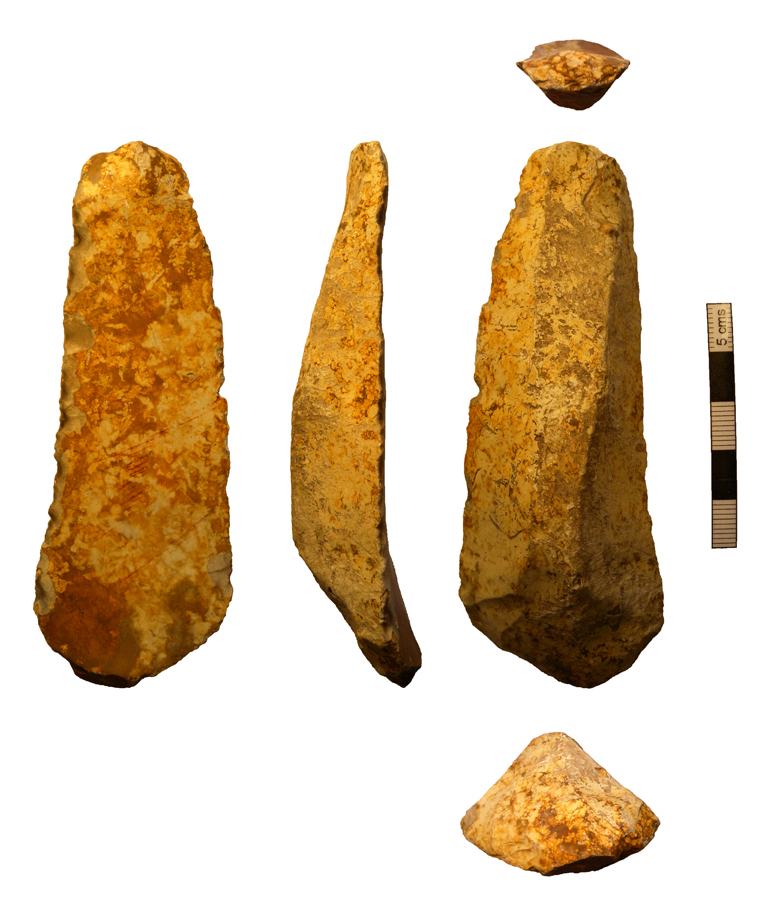
An example of an Upper Paleolithic blade.

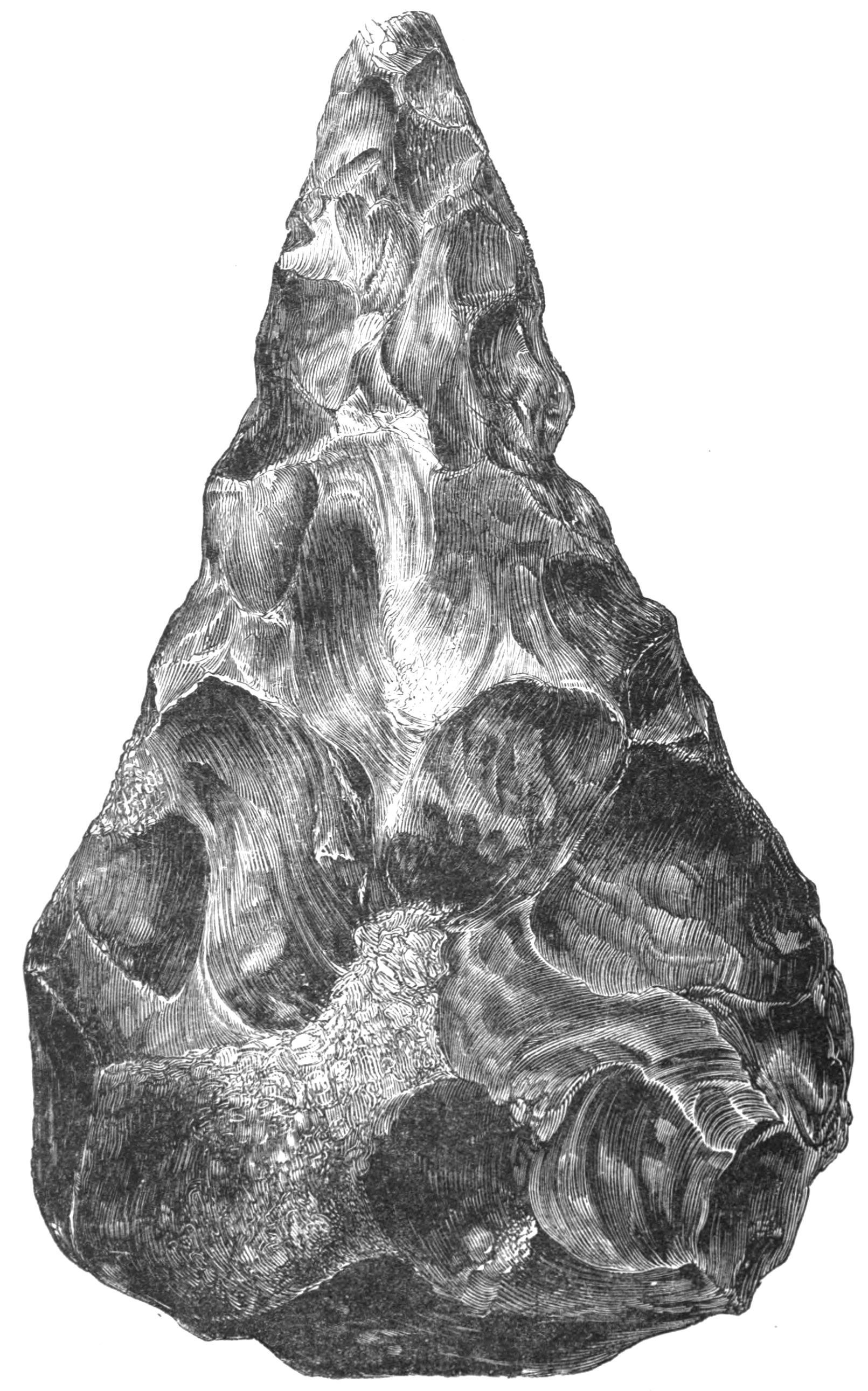
A picture of gray flint, the raw material used to build these tools.

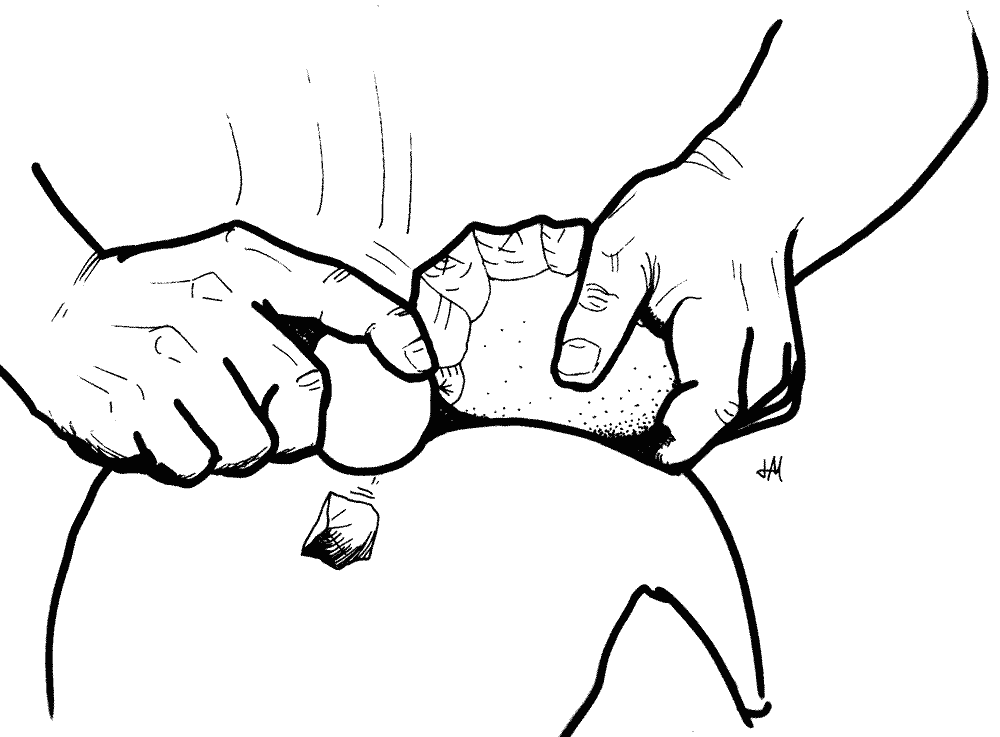
A depiction of what flintknapping looks like.

=== Stratigraphy ===
The site has been divided into five different stratigraphic units of varying composition and depth. The first 0.12 meters composes predominantly of topsoil before quickly transitioning to disturbed soil from agricultural activity until the 0.25 meter depth, making the second unit. The third unit, continuing to about 0.50 meters in depth, consists of light, yellow sand deposited from ancient river flows. Within the second layer itself there is also some sand diversity; going deeper into the soil demonstrates a transition from lighter sand to more brownish colored, with some ash interspersed in a sandy layer of intermediate hue. None of the units show any signs of fine lamination. The fourth unit, which contains the culture-bearing horizon, has thick, iron-based sand with much gravel, and also sees the disappearance of ash. Another important find in the third unit is the presence of diorite, which contains feldspar, and helped date the site's occupation using IRSL. Finally, at 0.60 meters of depth, the fifth unit is found, with light gray sand mixed with gravel, tinged brown from touching adjacent layers.

== Dating the site ==
=== Infrared Stimulated Luminescence (IRSL) Dating ===
IRSL Dating is based on a larger concept of Luminescence Dating. It surmises that certain trace elements, in this case Potassium, will gradually decay over time, with ionizing radiation transferring to a mineral grain in the sediment. The presence of feldspar in the fourth unit was the ideal candidate for this analysis. As ionizing radiation becomes trapped in the grain's lattice, it accumulates at a given rate based on background radiation. By stimulating the grain with a different electromagnetic wave, infrared for these dates, it releases the trapped electrons to give a signal proportional to the amount of radiation stored. The age is based on the total absorbed radiation (paleodose) divided by the dosage rate (sediment dosage rate). For the IRSL Dating at Riadino-5, additional trace elements of Uranium and Thorium were also taken into account from gamma-ray spectrometry. Additionally, the samples were used under the multiple-aliquot dosage technique involving exposure of multiple grains at a time. When done to the culture-bearing horizon layer from the fourth unit, approximately encompassing the layers from 0.50 to 0.56 centimetres, a concordant set of ages emerged: 52.4 ± 4.0 ka, 49.2 ± 3.8 ka, and 50.6 ± 3.9 ka. To confirm the exact dating range given the proximity of the samples to one another, an average of the luminescence counts was taken from each sample to create a new sample set. This new "sample" yielded a date range of 50.1 ± 3.9 ka, which corroborates the averaged 50.7 ka dates of the previous three samples. It is this average dating of the culture-bearing horizon that safely documents the site's occupation to the Middle to Upper Paleolithic transitional era from 50 to 44 ka.

=== Radiocarbon dating results ===
Radiocarbon dating uses the half-life of Carbon-14 to measure the amount of time that has passed since the carbon began decaying in a sample. For the purposes of the Riadino-5 site, both charcoal and ash layers were sampled at 0.23 meters and 0.45 meters below the surface respectively. After calibration, the charcoal yielded an age of 1693-1305 calendar year B.P., and the ash gave an age of 11718-8446 calendar year B.P. with a 95.4% confidence level.
