= Liepona =

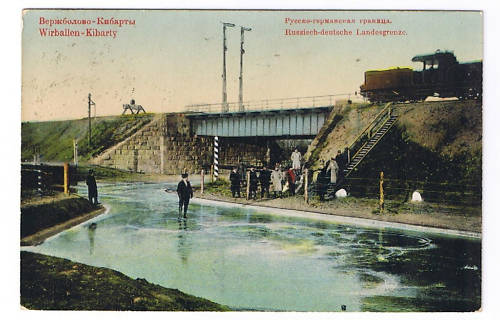

Location
- Country: Lithuania, Russia

Physical characteristics
- Source
  - location: 15 kilometres (9.3 mi) south of Kybartai
  - coordinates: 54°29′37.3″N 22°45′7.8″E
- Mouth: Širvinta
  - coordinates: 54°41′4″N 22°43′35″E
- Length: 35 km (22 mi)
- Basin size: 105 km^{2} (41 sq mi)
- Discharge
  - average: 0.65 m^{3}/s (23 cu ft/s)

Basin features
- Progression: Širvinta→ Šešupė→ Neman→ Baltic Sea

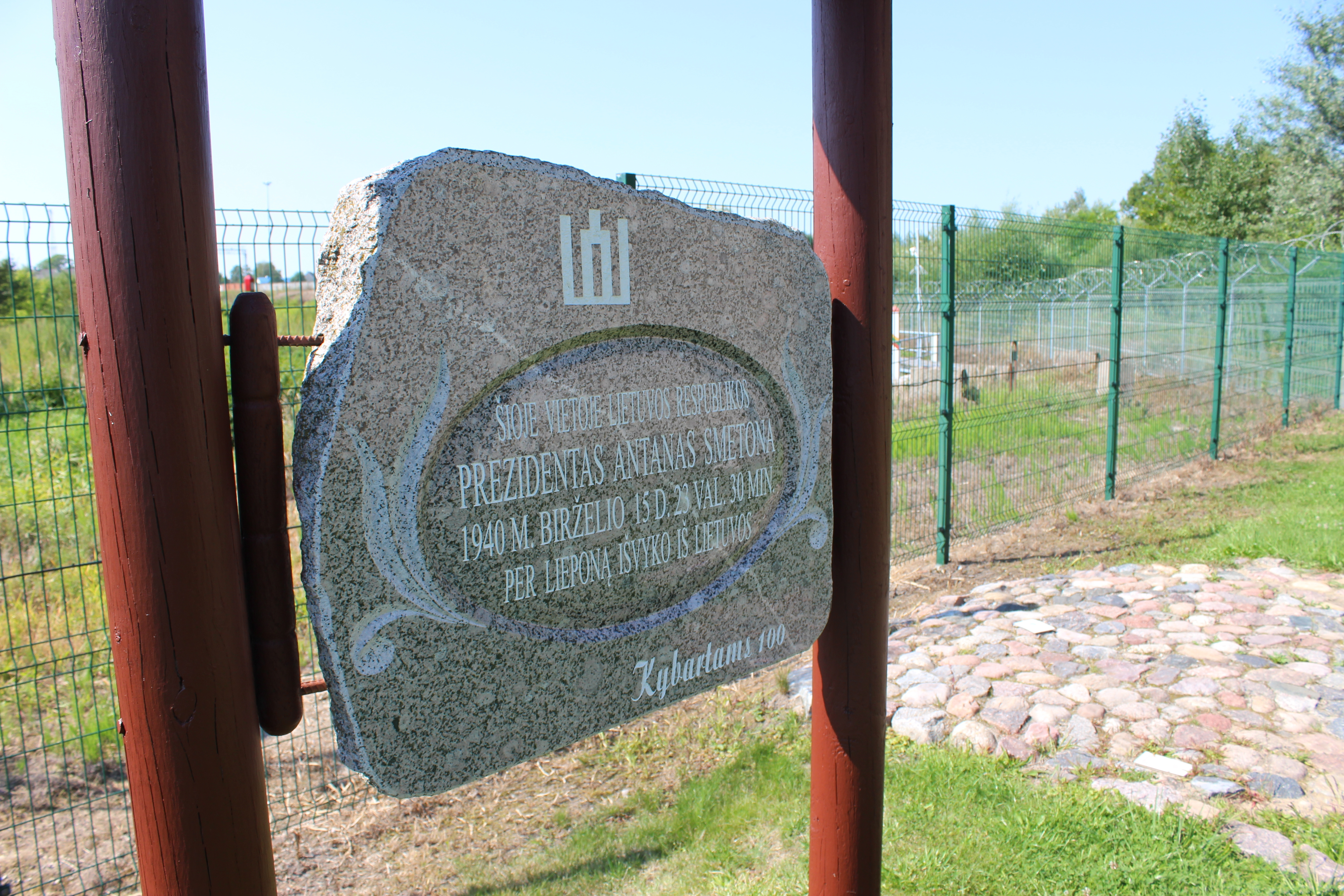
Memorial of Smetona's crossing.

Liepona (German: Lepone, Russian: Lipovka) is a small rivulet that flows for 22.9 km (14.2 mi) on the border of Lithuania and Kaliningrad Oblast, Russia. Left tributary to Širvinta, Liepona originates in Lithuania, near Kylininkai village. In 1980, a 26-hectare (64-acre) pond for irrigation was built about 16 km (9.9 mi) from the mouth.

It is famous for an incident in June 1940 when President of Lithuania Antanas Smetona had to cross the shallow river in order to reach Nazi Germany in the aftermath of the Soviet ultimatum to Lithuania. Liepona served as a natural border between Prussia and Lithuania since the Treaty of Melno of 1422 with the Teutonic Knights.
