= Pilvė =

River in Lithuania

Coordinates: 54°43′00″N 23°13′18″E

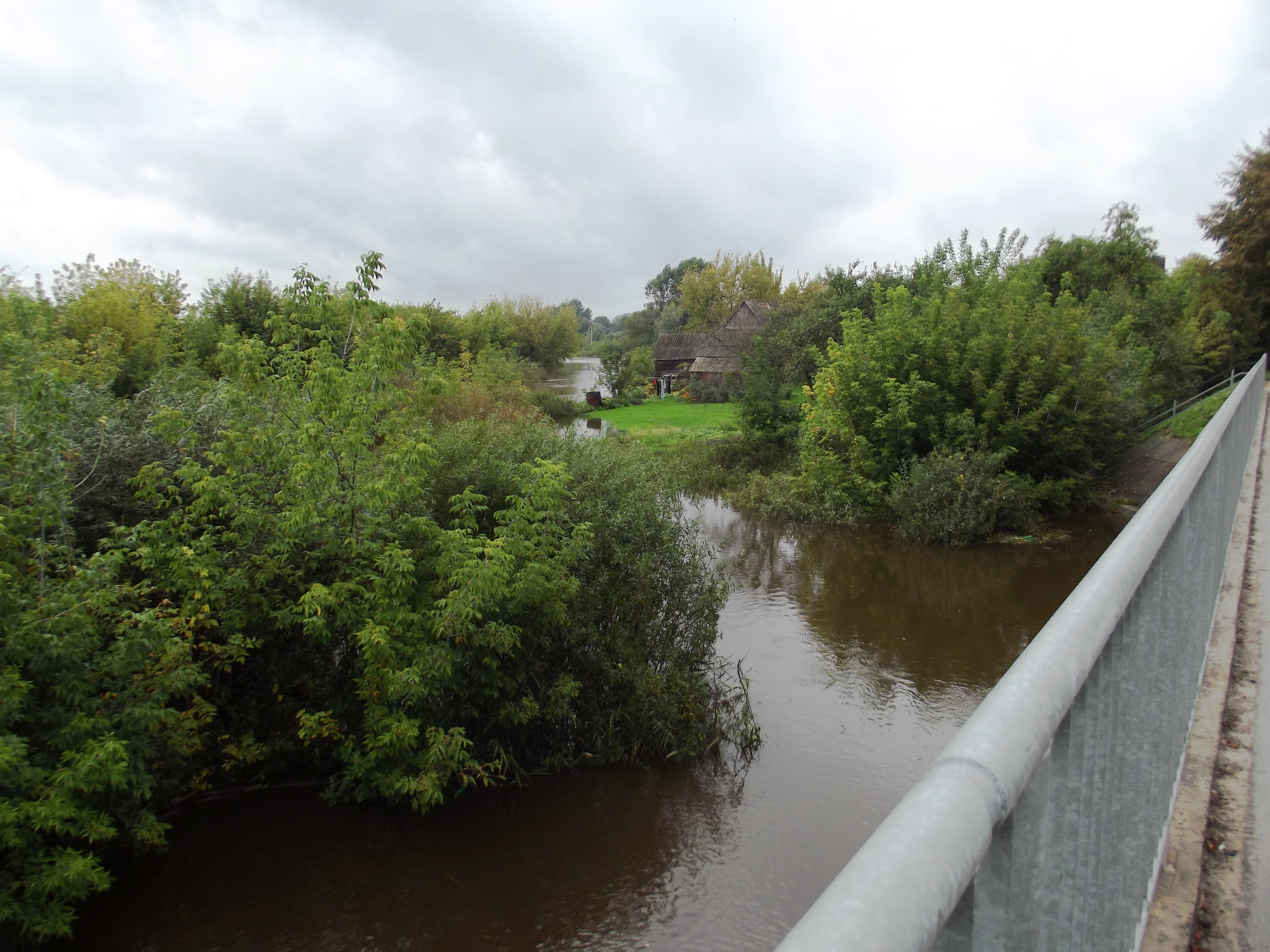
Pilvė at Pilviškiai, Vilkaviškis district

Pilvė is a river in Lithuania. It is the right tributary of the Šešupė. It begins in the Kaunas district, in the marshes southeast of Ežerėlis. It flows southwest through Prienai district, and Kazlų Rūda municipality through the Kazlų Rūda forest. It meanders sharply. In the lower reaches it flows west, flowing through the Vilkaviškis district. It flows into the Šešupė at Pilviškiai (153 km from the mouth of the Šešupė). Tributaries: left: Kunigupis, Didžiupis, Plaušinė, Meškinė, Vabalkšnė; right: Bartupė, Rūdupis. The stretch between Čečetai and Mažoji Senažiškė belongs to the Kazlų Rūda Landscape Reserve.

The name literally means "sludge, algae".
