= Marijampolė Realgymnasium =

Coordinates: 54°33′34″N 23°21′4″E

Marijampolė Realgymnasium (Lithuanian: Marijampolės realinė gimnazija) was a private gymnasium (secondary school) in Marijampolė, Lithuania. Established at the end of 1918, it employed many teachers sympathetic to socialist and communist causes. The Communist Party of Lithuania and other communist organizations were outlawed and actively persecuted in interwar Lithuania. The school actively protested and resisted mandatory religious education and clashed with Lithuanian authorities. As such, the school was shut down by the Lithuanian government on 30 June 1925.

== Organization ==
The school was established by a 14-member committee. Its founders included the attorney Andrius Bulota. It was officially established on 19 December 1918. The school was established as Lithuanian war refugees were returning from Russia and, influenced by the Russian Revolution, did not want to educate their children in the traditional Marijampolė Gymnasium.

It was a seven-year school, while other gymnasiums were eight-year schools. The school placed more emphasis on teaching math and natural sciences. It also taught Russian language (most other schools taught German, French, or English as a foreign language).

The school was self-governing. It had teachers' council (where students had two representatives with voting rights), students' council, and parents' council. Students' council and their participation in school governance were new developments in Lithuania. In 1922, the Ministry of Education wrote to the school ordering it to stop student participation in the teachers' council.

From June 1923, the school was maintained by the Lithuanian Teachers' Union. In 1924, the Lithuanian government ceased financial support for the school. It struggled financially and was late to pay teachers' wages.

A new law on secondary schools in Lithuania became effective on 23 April 1925. Two weeks later, on 6 May 1925, Minister of Education Kazimieras Jokantas (who previously was the principal of the traditional Marijampolė Gymnasium) issued order to close the school effective 30 June 1925. Jokantas cited the lack of the mandatory religious education and frequent arrests of students as the main reasons for the closure.

== Activities ==
=== Religious education ===
Religious education was mandatory in Lithuania (it was codified in the 1922 Constitution of Lithuania). The religious class was supposed to be taught by a Catholic priest assigned by the Diocese of Sejny. The first priest assigned to the school, Kazimieras Rėklaitis, lasted only a few days due to the anti-religious attitudes of other teachers and students. He was replaced by Vincentas Borisevičius and Ignas Česaitis, but they lasted only a couple of months. Česaitis resigned in March 1920. He resigned in protest of school's attempts to excuse two students from attending the religion class because, according to the canon law, such education was mandatory to everyone.

Since students did not have the mandatory credits in religion, they could not apply to a university. The Ministry of Education urged the Diocese of Sejny to assign a new priest, but the diocese delayed. A new priest, Antanas Steponaitis, was assigned only in August 1923. He resigned after Jonas Šliūpas delivered a lecture on free-thinking in October 1924. Steponaitis claimed that students disrespected him, defied directions, and ridiculed those who attempted to pray. The school attempted to get a new priest assigned, but the diocese refused to do so.

=== Amateur theater ===
The school hosted an amateur theater troupe. It was established in January 1920 by Albinas Iešmanta. In five years, the troupe staged 15 plays that were open to the public. The plays included Lithuanian works (America in the Bathhouse by Keturakis, Blinda by Gabrielius Landsbergis-Žemkalnis, Apsiriko by Žemaitė) and international classics (Ghosts by Henrik Ibsen, Uncle Vanya by Anton Chekhov, The Government Inspector by Nikolai Gogol).

The school also hosted public lectures by prominent Lithuanians, including Jonas Šliūpas, Vydūnas, Žemaitė, Jonas Kairiūkštis.

=== Student societies ===
The gymnasium hosted several socialist and communist student organizations. In March 1920, Bronius Pranskus organized a Marxist student organization. It was officially disbanded in March 1923, but continued to function until 1925. This student group maintained contacts with the Communist Party of Lithuania and Lithuanian Komsomol. The school became one of the key locations of Aušrininkai, a semi-formal socialist student movement.

=== Police troubles ===
Several students were arrested by the Lithuanian police. In 1921, the police arrested 20 people in Marijampolė in connection with the celebrations of May 1, the International Workers' Day. Among those arrested, were two students of the gymnasium. They were acquitted.

In January 1923, communists organized the funeral of Juozas Janušauskas, leader of a local labor union who died in Kaunas Prison. Catholics protested the funeral as they did not want to allow the burial of a "godless" man in the town's cemetery and communists clashed with the police. On 24–25 January 1923, the police arrested 13 students. This case was discussed at the Second Seimas of Lithuania. In November 1923, the Ministry of Education prohibited political student organizations in schools. However, that did not stop students' political activities and only forced them to be more secretive.

On 12–13 January 1925, the police searched the student dormitory maintained by Žiburėlis society as well as the apartment of teacher Stasys Matulaitis. They found antigovernmental literature and hand grenades. Matulaitis and several students were arrested. Two members of the Seimas accused the police for torture during the interrogations (beating and electrocution) of the arrested students. This was denied by the Minister of Education Antanas Endziulaitis.

== Notable personnel ==
School principals were:

- Due to difficult financial situation, at first the school did not have a principal
- Jonas Valaitis (December 1919 – September 1923)
- Stasys Totorius

Notable teachers included:

- Vincentas Borisevičius (religion)
- Pranas Brazdžius
- Adomas Lastas
- Petronėlė Lastienė (history)
- Stasys Matulaitis (biology, history, geography)
- Juozas Žiugžda

== Notable alumni ==
Notable alumni included:

- Kazimieras Baršauskas (physicists)
- Kazimieras Bieliukas (geographer)
- Andrius Bulota (jurist)
- Antanas Gavelis (military pilot)
- Pijus Glovackas (communist)
- Martynas Gudelis (writer)
- Juozas Kupčinskas (physician)
- Kazimieras Lukša (economist)
- Michalina Meškauskienė (government minister)
- Nikolajus Milenskis (engineer)
- Bronius Pranskus (communist)
- Sergijus Staniškis (soldier)
