= Širvinta (Šešupė) =

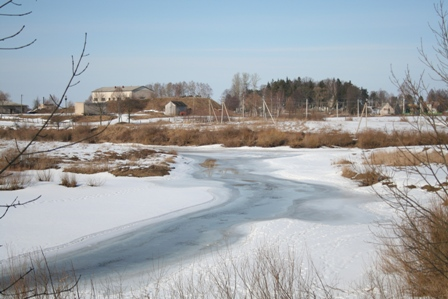
- Mouth of the Širvinta river

Location
- Country: Lithuania, Russia

Physical characteristics
- Mouth: Šešupė
  - coordinates: 54°46′39″N 22°51′34″E
- Length: 43.8 km (27.2 mi)
- Basin size: 1,312.9 km^{2} (506.9 sq mi)
- Discharge
  - average: 7.91 m^{3}/s (279 cu ft/s)

Basin features
- Progression: Šešupė→ Neman→ Baltic Sea

Širvinta , (Note: also Šervinta or Senaširvintė; Russian: Шервинта German: Schirwindt. It is the former name of the abandoned Kutuzovo, Krasnoznamensky District, Kaliningrad Oblast, formerly a town) is a river in southwestern Lithuania (and part of the border with Kaliningrad Oblast, Russia), a left tributary of Šešupė.

It begins in Vilkaviškis District Municipality, west of the village of Alvitas, and flows northwest in its upper reaches. From the confluence with the Liepona, the river flows north, then northeast, forming about 20 kilometres (12 mi) of the Lithuania–Russia border. The river then passes the Širvinta bridge built by the Germans in Kudirkos Naumiestis, and flows into the Šešupė, at a total length of 43.8 km (27.2 mi).

== Name ==
The river's name is derived from the Lithuanian word śirvas, which means grey.

== Characteristics ==
The river's average discharge is about 1.49 m³/s at the confluence with Rausvė, then increases to 4.03 m³/s at the merge of Šeimena, and finally increases to 7.91 m³/s at the river mouth. The average gradient of the river is 71 cm/km, and the upper course of the river have been regulated.

In the 19th century, the Širvinta River was shortened by 38 km when the upper course of the river was rerouted near Alvitas, creating a separate Širvinta river.

== Tributaries ==
Širvinta basin in Lithuania

=== Right ===
- Šeimena

=== Left ===
- Versnupė
- Prūdupelis
- Rausvė
- Ėglupis
- Liepona
- Rausvė (Tumannaya (Russian: Туманная))
- Upelis
