= Liudvinavas =

- Town
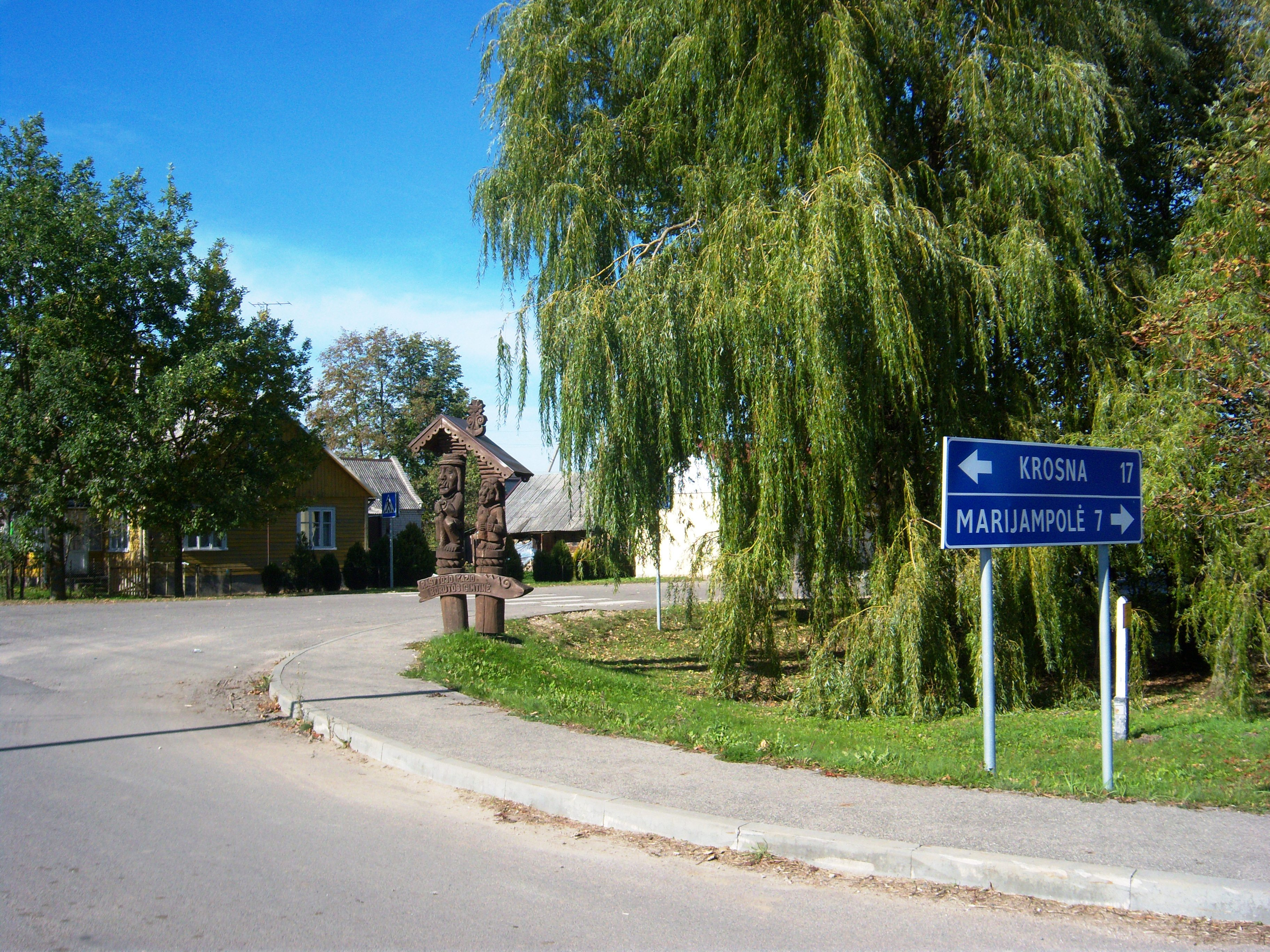

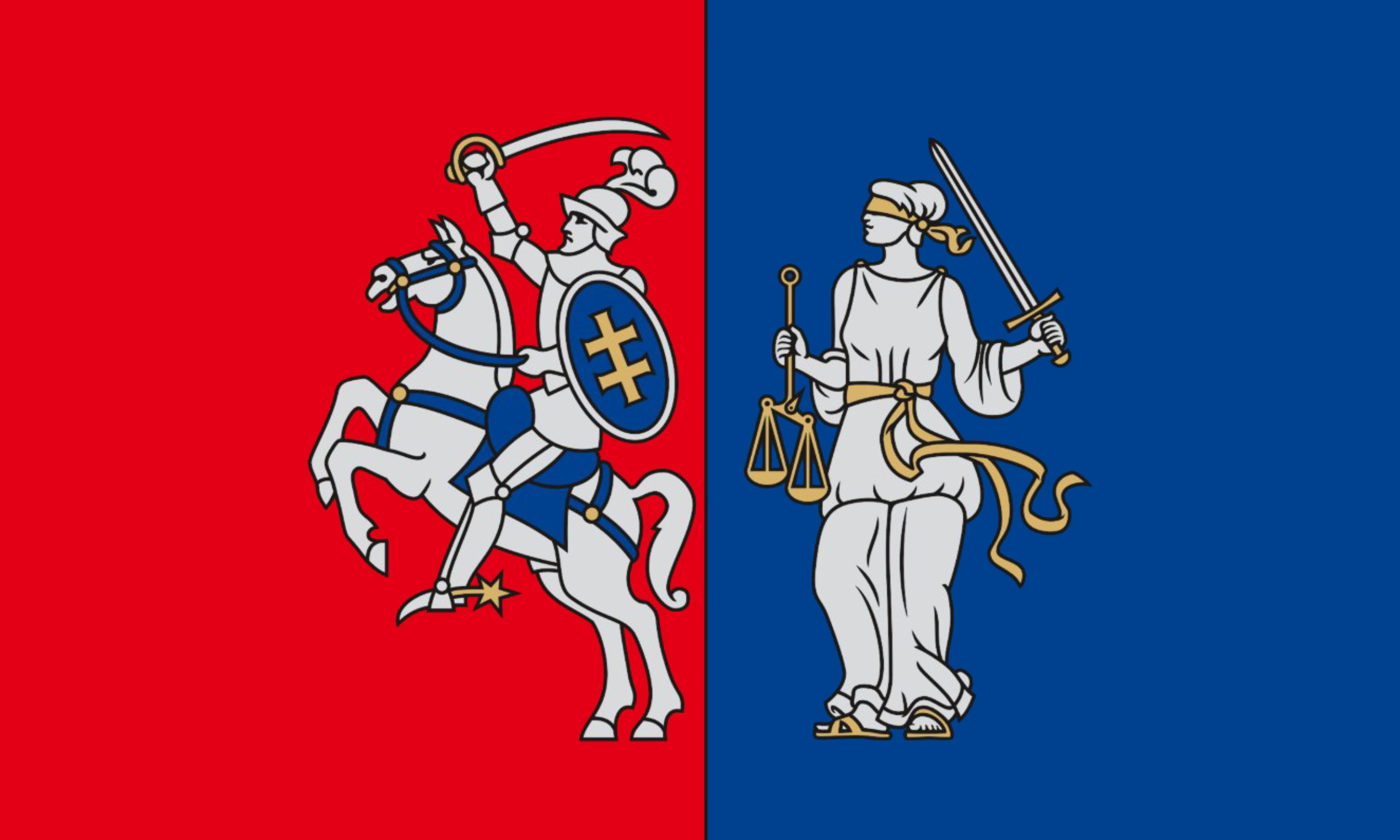
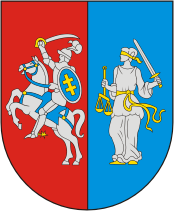
- Flag Coat of arms

- Location within Lithuania
- Coordinates: 54°29′0″N 23°21′10″E
- Country: Lithuania
- County: Marijampolė County
- Municipality: Marijampolė Municipality
- Eldership: Liudvinavas Eldership

Government
  - Elder: Regina Pakrosnevičienė

Population (2021)
  - Total: 843
- Time zone: UTC+2 (EET)
  - Summer (DST): UTC+3 (EEST)

Liudvinavas (Polish: Ludwinów) is a small town in Marijampolė municipality, 9 km south of Marijampolė. It is the seat of the Liudvinavas Eldership. There is a church of Saint Louis (Louis IX of France), built in 1730, a high school, a kindergarten, a library, a cultural centre, a post office (LT-69022), a primary health care clinic and hydroelectric power plant in Liudvinavas. The town is famous for The Feast of St. Louis, which is celebrated annually on the last Sunday of August. In 2019 Liudvinavas was named Lithuania's Little Capital of Culture.

According to the 2011 census, the town has a population of 966 people.

== History ==
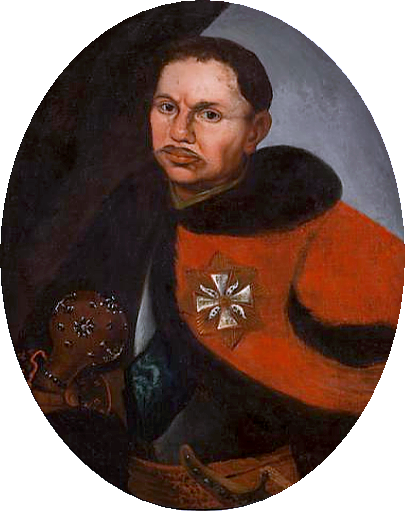
Liudvikas Pociejus – founder of the town

Liudvinavas was first settled in the early 18th century in the Punia Forest. It was originally called Trobos. The Elder of Punia, Liudvikas Pociejus, founded a town on the site of Trobos and gave it its present name.

Around 1717, the first church in Liudvinavas was built. On 14 January 1719, the town was granted Magdeburg rights and soon after the Liudvinavas manor was established. In 1776, the town's rights were annulled. On 10 November 1791, the rights of the free town and the coat of arms were granted again by King Stanislaus Augustus, but in the summer of 1792, the change in the political situation led to the abolition of the municipality and the coat of arms. In 1870, once again Liudvinavas has lost its town rights, as part of Tsarist repressions after the January Uprising.

A new church was built around 1864, and in 1908 a small library was established. In December 1905, the townspeople of Liudvinavas drove out the Russian authorities of the town.

During the World War I, most of the Liudvinavas was destroyed by fire. The description of the town in the early 20th century:

A rather small town - it used to be much bigger, with as many as thirty inns, market and Magdeburg rights - and now with thatched cottages, with only a few merchants' mason houses in the town centre by the road, and a newly built brick school beside a church.

— Kazys Boruta

The Molotov-Ribbentrop Pact, signed in August 1939, determined that Liudvinavas, as well as the whole of Lithuania, would be ceded to Germany; but soon after the signing of an additional treaties, almost the entire territory of Lithuania was placed under the influence of the USSR, while Liudvinavas (like Kapčiamiestis and Vilkaviškis) remained in Germany's zone, but was later reclaimed by Stalin.

September 1941. The town's Jews were murdered. After the World War II, Lithuanian partisans of the Vytautas Brigade of the Tauras District were active in the area. On 27 April 1947, the Chief of Staff V. Vabalas (nickname Kunigaikštis) was killed when the Soviet forces surrounded his bunker near Liudvinavas. In 1940-1941 and 1944- 1953 the Soviet authorities deported 16 people to Siberia from the town.

The town's coat of arms, granted by King Stanislaus August Poniatowski in 1791, was restored by decree of the President of the Republic of Lithuania in 2001.
