= Juozas Montvila =

Lithuanian Catholic priest (1885–1912)

The Reverend Father Juozas Montvila
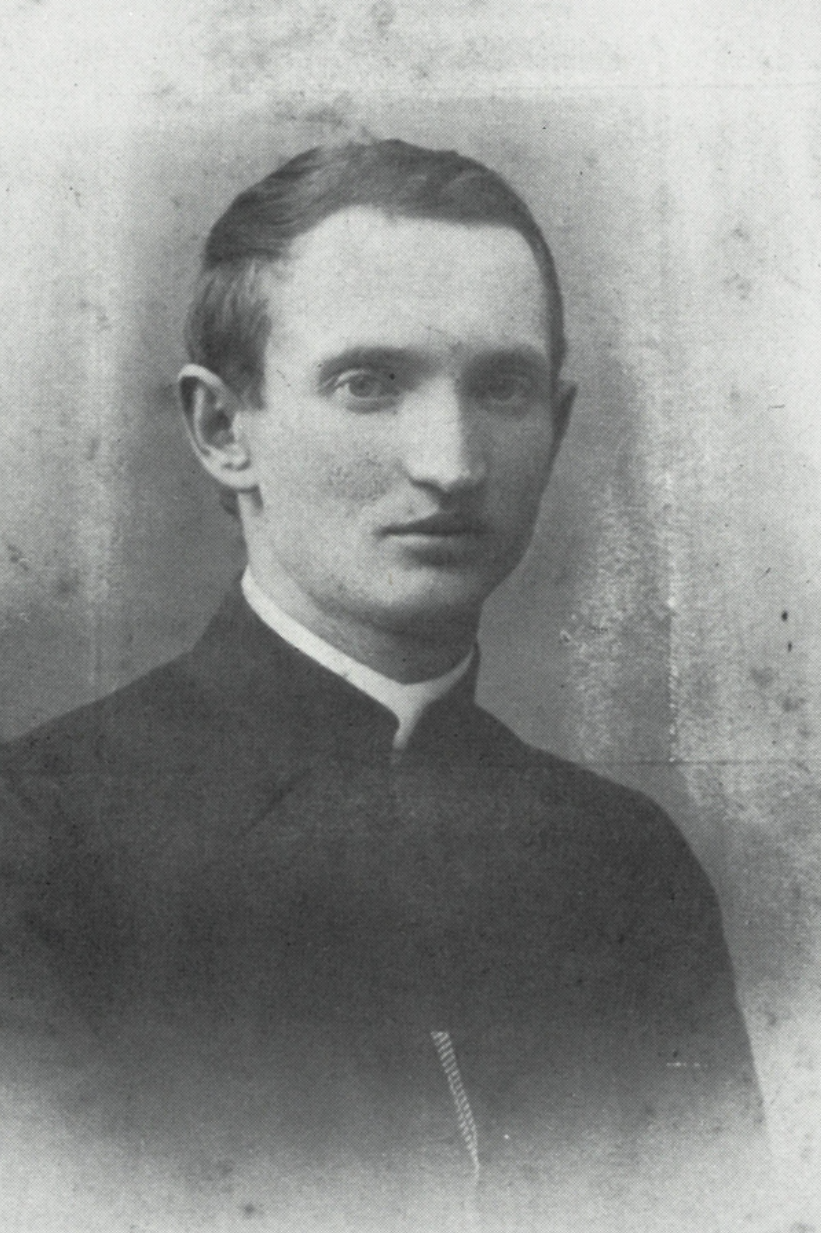
- Church: Catholic Church

Orders
- Ordination: 22 March 1908

Personal details
- Born: Juozas Montvila; 3 January 1885 Gudinė, Russian Empire
- Died: 15 April 1912 (aged 27) North Atlantic Ocean
- Buried: Atlantic Ocean
- Denomination: Roman Catholic
- Education: Marijampolė Gymnasium
- Alma mater: Sejny Priest Seminary

Juozas Montvila (also anglicized as Joseph Mantvila; 3 January 1885 – 15 April 1912) was a Lithuanian Catholic priest who was a passenger of the Titanic during its sinking.

== Biography ==
=== Early life and career ===
Juozas Montvila was born on 3 January 1885 in Gudinė as the son of Kazys Montvila and Magdalena Montvilienė née Karalevičiūtė. The family later moved to Nendriniškiai, where they bought a farm. Montvila was baptized in Marijampolė and received his First Communion there. Montvila's parents educated their children privately at home with secret in-home tutors called daraktoriai. Montvila was educated by his grandfather Martynas Karalevičius. Montvila attended the primary school in Marijampolė, and later attended the Marijampolė Gymnasium.

After graduating, Montvila began studying at the Sejny Priest Seminary in 1903. Due to the seminary's strictness, Montvila briefly left the seminary. Montvila was ordained as a priest in Warsaw on 22 March 1908, and was assigned as a vicar in Lipsk where he secretly administered to the needs of the Uniates. Due to his illegal activity, the Tsarist government was to strip Montvila's vicariate and deny his pastoral vocation. Montvila consequently began working for numerous Catholic newspapers. He was also a gifted artist who drew illustrations and vignettes for various newspapers and books published in Vilnius. Montvila also published at least twenty-five sermons.

=== Emigration ===
Montvila wished to travel abroad due to his realization that he most likely wouldn't have been accepted back into Lithuania for pastoral work. Montvila planned on meeting his brother Petras in the United States. Montvila first arrived in London on 20 March 1912, where he worked at St Casimir's Lithuanian Church and learned English. He eventually boarded the Titanic in Southampton. Montvila chose to board the Titanic due to the hope that the then-modern ship would alleviate his sea-sickness. Montvila also carried Antanas Juška's collection of Lithuanian folk songs, which he hoped to publish in the United States.

It is unclear what Montvila's plans were after his arrival in the United States. According to a friend of Montvila's sister who lived in Brooklyn, Montvila was to head a parish in the growing Lithuanian quarter community of the city. However, two gazettes entitled Jackson (Miss.) News and Worcester Evening noted that Montvila was going to Worcester, Massachusetts instead. The Boston Globe noted on 26 April 1912 that Montvila was on his way to Worcester as curate for Vincent Buchoviecki, a pastor of the city's St Casimir's Lithuanian Church.

=== Death ===
According to reports, after the Titanic's collision, Montvila "served his calling to the very end" by refusing a place on one of the lifeboats, and offering solace to fellow travelers. Montvila eventually died and his body sank. His body was never identified.

His parents and grandparents received a grant of 130 GBP from the Titanic Relief Fund.

== Remembrance ==
In 1977, Petras Montvila released a book about the life of his brother. A commemorative medal was made in 1992 with the funds of Andrius Montvila. A monumental rock was built in his home village. Furthermore, Montvila was considered for beatification.
