= Andrius Bulota =

Lithuanian lawyer and politician

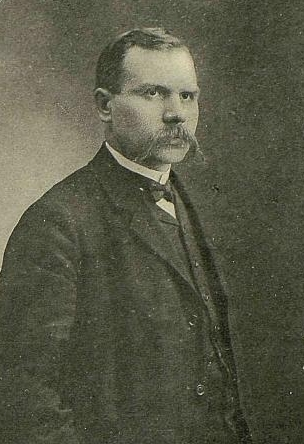
- Bulota in 1910
- Born: 16 November 1872; Putriškiai, Suwałki Governorate, Congress Poland
- Died: 16 August 1941 (aged 68); Paneriai, Generalbezirk Litauen
- Cause of death: Ponary massacre
- Education: Marijampolė Gymnasium; Saint Petersburg University
- Occupations: Attorney, politician
- Political party: Lithuanian Democratic Party; Trudoviks; Socialist Revolutionary Party

Andrius Bulota (Russian: Андрей Андреевич Булат, romanized: Andrei Andreevich Bulat; 16 November 1872 – 16 August 1941) was a Lithuanian lawyer and politician in the Russian Empire. He was a member of the Second and Third Russian State Dumas (1907–1912) and the Russian Constituent Assembly (1918).

Educated at the Saint Petersburg University, Bulota worked at the district court of Tallinn (1898—1903) and then as an attorney. He joined Lithuanian cultural and political life. He supported the publication of Lithuanian newspaper Varpas and was one of the founders of the Lithuanian Democratic Party. He actively participated in the Russian Revolution of 1905 and the Great Seimas of Vilnius, and was briefly arrested by the Tsarist police. As a member of the Trudoviks, he was elected to the Second and Third Russian State Dumas. He spoke hundreds of times at the Duma on issues ranging from local Lithuanian matters to introducing a bill granting women equal voting rights. As an attorney, Bulota worked on the defense in several political trials including those of Ilya Fondaminsky, signers of the Vyborg Manifesto, Vincas Kapsukas.

At the outbreak of World War I, Bulota organized aid for the war refugees and traveled to the United States and Canada to raise funds from Lithuanian communities for the relief efforts. Upon return in 1917, as a member of the Socialist Revolutionary Party, he joined various Russian political institutions, including the All-Russian Central Executive Committee of the Soviets of Workers' and Soldiers' Deputies, Provisional Council of the Russian Republic, and Russian Constituent Assembly.

After the Bolshevik takeover, he returned to Lithuania and settled in Marijampolė. There he founded Marijampolė Realgymnasium which was closed by the Lithuanian government in 1925 for supporting communist causes. After his nephew made an attempt on the life of Prime Minister Augustinas Voldemaras in 1929, Bulota was briefly jailed at the Varniai concentration camp and then ordered to leave Lithuania. He returned to Marijampolė in 1930. After the Soviet occupation of Lithuania in June 1940, Bulota joined the new Soviet regime and headed the legal department of the Presidium of the Supreme Council of the Lithuanian SSR. After the German invasion of the Soviet Union in June 1941, Bulota was arrested and executed in the Ponary massacre on 16 August 1941.

== Biography ==
=== Early life and education ===
Bulota was born on 16 November 1872 in Putriškiai village in Suvalkija. Due to the Lithuanian press ban, he learned to read Lithuanian in a clandestine school in the village. After graduating from a primary school in 1884, he enrolled at Marijampolė Gymnasium. His parents wanted him to become a Catholic priest When he refused, his parents cut off financial support and he was forced to earn a living by tutoring other children. He joined Lithuanian cultural life and read and distributed the banned Lithuanian publications. In 1892, he attended a meeting of Varpas contributors and publishers. From 1893, he contributed poems and short news to Varpas and Ūkininkas.

In 1892–1897, Bulota studied law at Saint Petersburg University. During this time, he was an active member and chairman of an illegal Lithuanian student society. He also helped Eduards Volters to edit and publish the history of Lithuania by Simonas Daukantas. During summer vacations, he would return to Lithuania and help Lithuanian book smugglers, particularly the Sietynas Society. After graduation from the university, Bulota was drafted for the mandatory service in the Imperial Russian Army and was promoted to praporshchik.

=== Russian Empire ===
==== Activist ====
In 1898–1903, Bulota worked at the district court of Tallinn (as a Catholic, he was not allowed to work in Lithuania). Bulota became a sworn attorney in 1904. He worked on several political cases, including the defense of Ilya Fondaminsky, Trudoviks who signed the Vyborg Manifesto, Vincas Kapsukas, and Leonas Prūseika. In 1908, he defended the arrested members of Šviesa Society (educational society in Marijampolė established by Kazys Grinius) and even personally visited Prime Minister Pyotr Stolypin and raised the issue in the State Duma.

He continued to be involved with Lithuanian activities. He financially supported the publication of Varpas and helped Jonas Jablonskis to edit the 70,000-word Lithuanian–Polish dictionary of Antanas Juška. Tsarist police searched his residence in connection with the trials of Sietynas Society and Liudas Vaineikis, but Bulota managed to avoid persecution. In 1902, he attended the founding meeting of the Lithuanian Democratic Party.

He actively participated in the Russian Revolution of 1905 in Estonia. As a member of the Lithuanian Democratic Party, he attended the Great Seimas of Vilnius and was considered for its presidium. He spoke three times during the proceedings, including on the key issue of seeking autonomy for Lithuania. In December 1905, Bulota was arrested for organizing a workers' strike. He was released on 10,000 ruble bail after three months and the case was subsequently dropped.

==== State Duma ====
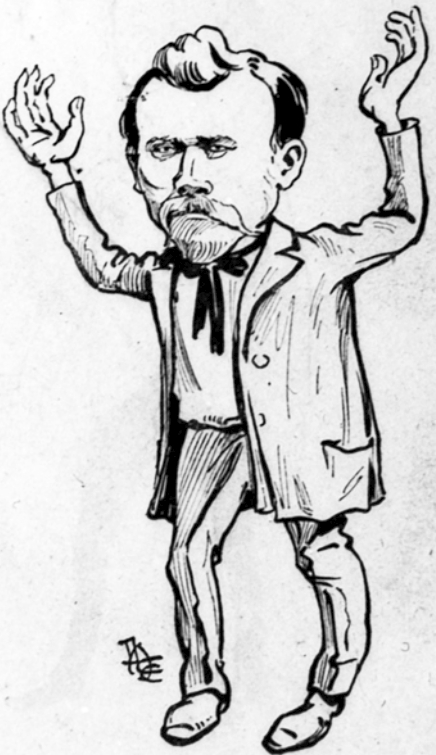
Caricature of Bulota (1907)

In 1907, Bulota was elected to the Second and Third Russian State Dumas as a representative from the Suwałki Governorate. He was a leader of the Trudovik (labor group) fraction. He was also a leader of other Lithuanian representatives in the Duma. He spoke hundreds of times during the sessions of the Duma on Lithuanian and more general issues. For example, he spoke on allowing Lithuanian language in schools, establishing local government (zemstvo) in Lithuania, establishing an agricultural school in Dotnuva. He obtained a government grant for the first exhibition of Lithuanian farmers in Marijampolė, which was organized by the Marijampolė Farmers' Society and Žagrė Society. In addition, together with others, he worked on a proposal for Lithuania's autonomy.

He also spoke on issues like land reform, freedom of religion, constitution of Finland, etc. In 1908, he attended the conference of the Inter-Parliamentary Union in Berlin. In early 1909, he helped to expose Yevno Azef as an agent provocateur of the Okhrana. In February 1912, he introduced a bill drafted by the League for Women's Equality on granting women equal voting rights, but it was rejected. As historian Nerijus Udrėnas summarized, Bulota was an "idealist lawyer defended all the weak and disadvantaged".

He was not reelected to the Duma in 1912. He then moved to Vilnius where he worked as an attorney. He continued to active in the Lithuanian Democratic Party and contributed articles to party's periodicals Lietuvos žinios and Lietuvos ūkininkas. Bulota joined several Masonic lodges, including Polar Star (headed by Maksim Kovalevsky) in Saint Petersburg in 1908, Litwa in 1913, and Białoruś in 1914.

=== World War I ===
At the outbreak of World War I, he organized aid for the war refugees, was one of the founders of the Lithuanian Society for the Relief of War Sufferers (though, together with other leftists, he was soon removed from the organization), and a representative of the Imperial Tatiana Committee. He personally toured the devastated Suwałki Governorate and organized soup kitchens and medical aid stations.

In December 1915, together with others, Bulota founded the Lithuanian newspaper Naujoji Lietuva in Saint Petersburg. It propagated ideas of the Lithuanian Socialist People's Union (Lietuvos socialistų liaudininkų sąjunga) (Bulota was a member of its Central Committee).

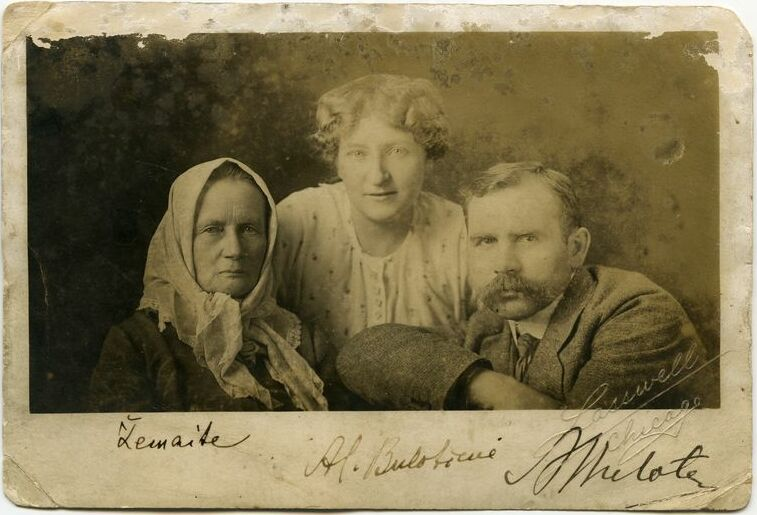
Postcard with Žemaitė, Bulotienė, and Bulota given to those who donated money for the refugee relief

Invited by the Lithuanian Relief Fund (Lietuvos šelpimo fondas), Bulota together with his wife Aleksandra Bulotienė (as a representative of Žiburėlis society) and writer Žemaitė travelled to the United States in 1916. From March 1916 to April 1917, they toured about a hundred cities with Lithuanian American and Lithuanian Canadian communities and raised about US$50,000 (equivalent to $1,479,358 in 2025) for the relief efforts in Lithuania.

He returned via San Francisco and Vladivostok to Saint Petersburg in May 1917. He was elected to the All-Russian Central Executive Committee of the Soviets of Workers' and Soldiers' Deputies and became the head of its judicial department. After the July Days, he chaired a special commission to investigate the Bolsheviks responsible for the riots. He was a member of the Provisional Council of the Russian Republic. Bulota was elected to the Russian Constituent Assembly in the Vitebsk electoral district as a member of the Socialist Revolutionary Party.

=== Independent Lithuania ===
After the Russian Constituent Assembly was dispersed by the Bolsheviks in January 1918, Bulota returned to Tallinn and then Marijampolė. At the end of 1918, Bulota together with others established the Marijampolė Realgymnasium. It was a private high school which became known for its support of socialist and communist causes. The school was closed by the Lithuanian government in 1925.

As an attorney, Bulota defended members of the Polish Military Organisation (PMO) accused of the attempted coup against the Lithuanian government in August–September 1919. Bulota established a local credit union and was elected to the local district council. In 1921, he attended a meeting of the former members of the Russian Constituent Assembly in Paris.

On 6 May 1929, Bulota's nephew also named Andrius Bulota and two others attempted to assassinate Prime Minister Augustinas Voldemaras. As a result, on 31 May 1929, Bulota together with his wife Aleksandra were imprisoned at the Varniai concentration camp. They were released after three months on a condition that they would leave Lithuania. They lived in Czechoslovakia for over a year and were allowed to return to Marijampolė in 1930. In 1931, he attended the 4th Congress of the Labour and Socialist International in Vienna.

=== World War II ===
After the Soviet occupation of Lithuania in June 1940, Bulota joined the new Soviet regime. He was a member of the electoral commission that organized the show elections to the People's Seimas and headed the legal department of the Presidium of the Supreme Council of the Lithuanian SSR. After the German invasion of the Soviet Union in June 1941, Bulota was arrested and executed in the Ponary massacre on 16 August 1941.

== Personal life ==
In 1913, Bulota married Aleksandra Stepanova (1891–1941). She was born in Omsk and attended university in Switzerland. She was active in public life, particularly in Žiburėlis society which provided financial aid to Lithuanian students. After the Soviet occupation, she worked at the Presidium of the Supreme Council of the Lithuanian SSR. She was executed together with Bulotas in Ponary. They did not have children, but cared after eight sons of Bulota's brother.

The family was close with the writer Žemaitė. She taught Aleksandra the Lithuanian language. Bulotas and Žemaitė toured Lithuanian communities in the United States and Canada in 1916–1917. Bulotas also took care of Žemaitė during her last months before her death in December 1921. Andrius Bulota published four volumes of collected works of Žemaitė, while Aleksandra translated several short stories to Russian.

Around 1925, Bulota purchased a wooden house in Marijampolė where he lived until 1940. Since then, the house was used by various institutions, but some of the original architectural details have been preserved. A memorial museum dedicated to the Bulotas family was opened in the house after extensive renovations in 2017–2020.
