= Dovinė =

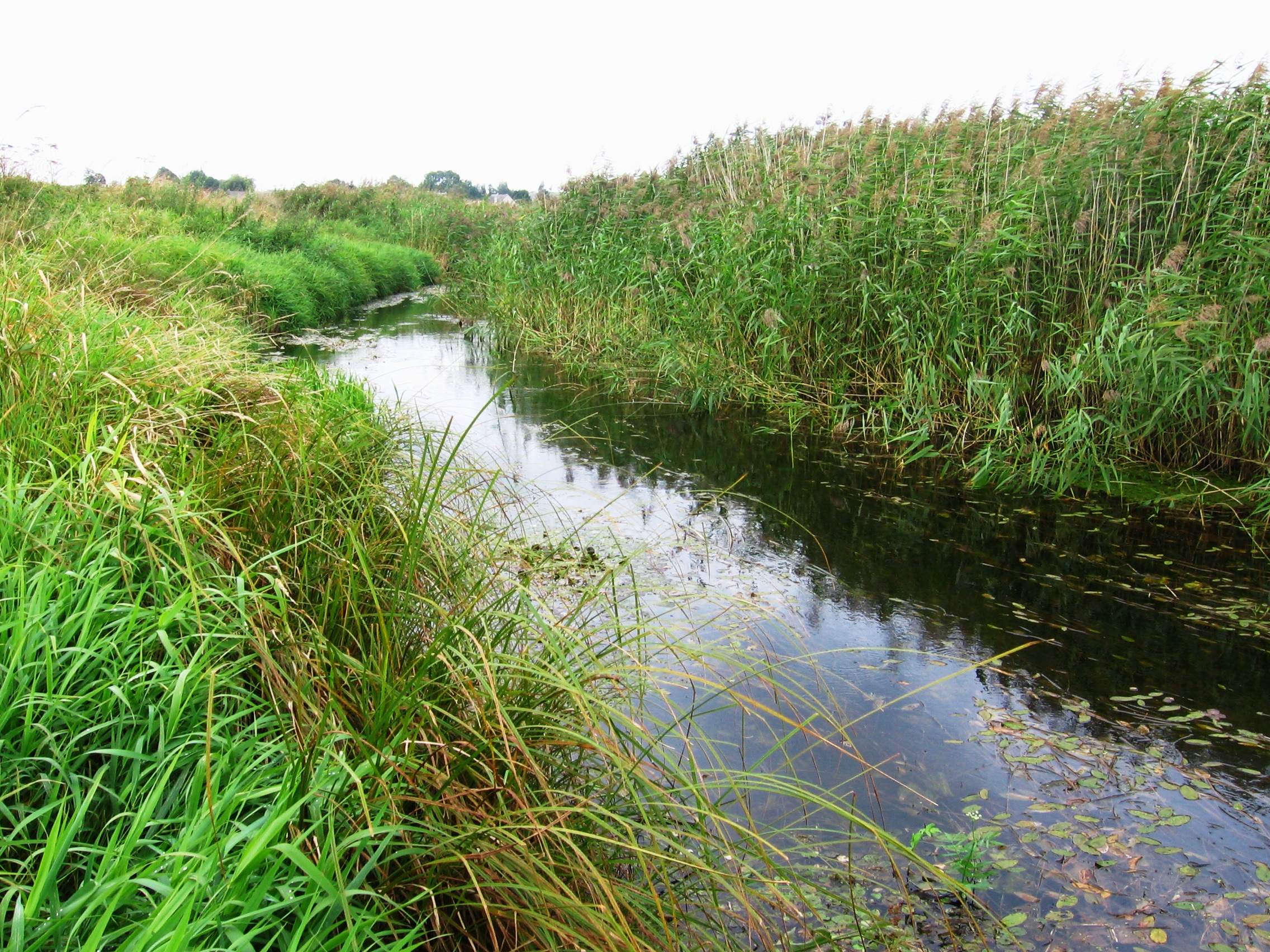

Location
- Country: Lithuania
- Location: Marijampolė County, Alytus County

Physical characteristics
- Source
  - location: Lake Dusia
- Mouth: Šešupė
  - coordinates: 54.4920°N 23.3692°E
- Length: 47 km (29 mi)
- Basin size: 588.7 km^{2} (227.3 sq mi)
- Discharge
  - average: 3.4 m^{3}/s (120 cu ft/s)

Basin features
- Progression: Šešupė→ Neman→ Baltic Sea
- Tributaries
  - left: Pelėdupis, Kiaulyčia
  - right: Šlavanta, Užupelis

The Dovinė is a river of Marijampolė County and Alytus County, in southern Lithuania. The 47 kilometres (29 mi) Dovinė has a basin area of 588.7 km^{2}.

It is a right tributary of the river Šešupė.
