= Pranas Čepėnas =

Pranas Čepėnas (4 April 1899 in Veleikiai, Kovno Governorate – 3 December 1980 in Worcester, Massachusetts) was a Lithuanian historian, encyclopedist, journalist, and lexicographer. In 1926 Čepėnas earned a diploma in history from University of Lithuania. He worked as professor of history at Vilnius University. During World War II he emigrated to Germany and later to the U.S. He then worked at factories in Chicago, before working on the "Lietuvių enciklopedija" from 1953 to 1967.

== Major works ==
- Editor of interwar Lietuviškoji enciklopedija (Lithuanian Encyclopedia) and Dictionary of International Words.
- Naujųjų laikų Lietuvos istorija vol I and II (1988), English: History of Lithuania in Modern Times
- Editor of Lietuviškoji enciklopedija printed in Boston.
