= Marijampolė Gymnasium =

Coordinates: 54°33′36″N 23°20′57″E

Marijampolė Rygiškių Jonas Gymnasium
- Marijampolės Rygiškių Jono gimnazija
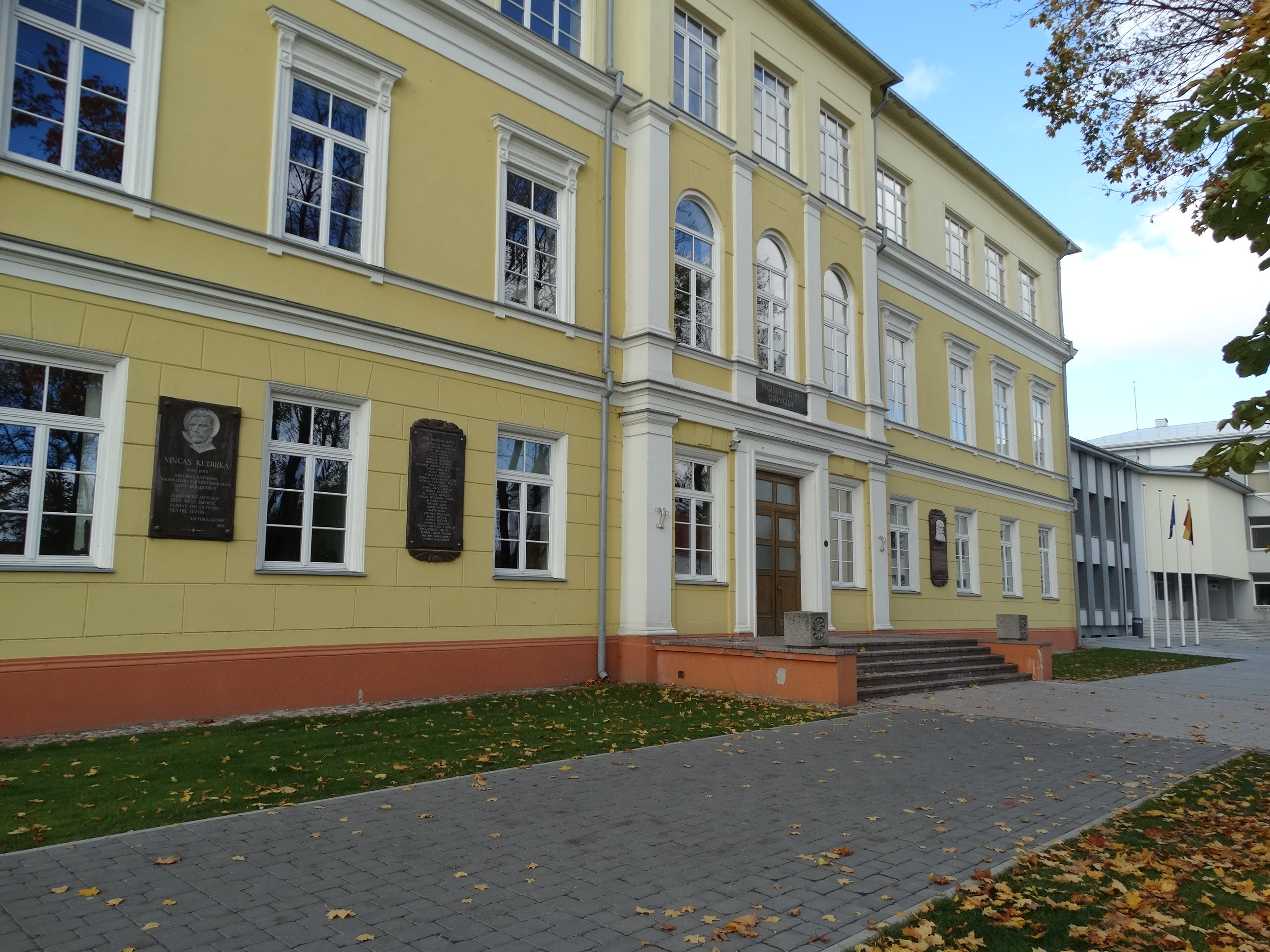
- Marijampolė; Lithuania

Information
- Type: Secondary school
- Established: 1867
- Enrollment: 1062
- Website: http://www.mrjg.lt/

Marijampolė Rygiškių Jonas Gymnasium (Lithuanian: Marijampolės Rygiškių Jono gimnazija) is a secondary school in Marijampolė, Lithuania. It is named after Rygiškių Jonas, one of the pen names of linguist Jonas Jablonskis who was one of the gymnasium's alumni. Established in 1867, the gymnasium was a significant cultural center of Suvalkija and educated many prominent figures of the Lithuanian National Revival. Since 2010, it is a four-year school (9–12th years of secondary education).

== History ==
The school traces its roots to 1840, when a four-year school was moved from Sejny to Marijampolė, which was then part of the Suwałki Governorate, Congress Poland. The school was geared towards children of Polish nobles and was known far its anti-Lithuanian bias. After the Uprising of 1863, Tsarist authorities decided to implement various Russification policies, including the Lithuanian press ban and de-Polonization of schools. That meant that children of Lithuanian farmers were encouraged to attend the school in Marijampolė, which in 1867 was converted into a seven-year gymnasium. The Tsarist authorities also established ten annual scholarships of 360 rubles for children of Lithuanian farmers who graduated from Marijampolė and Suwałki Gymnasiums to study at Moscow and Saint Petersburg Universities. In 1870, a dedicated two-storey brick building was erected.

During World War I, the gymnasium was evacuated to Yaroslavl until 1918. The gymnasium was reestablished in independent Lithuania and was known as one of the best schools in the country. In 1920, it was named after one of the pen names of Jonas Jablonskis. Its director Kazys Jokantas became Minister of Education (1925–1926) and teacher Vincas Vilkaitis became rector of Lithuanian Agricultural Academy (1934–1940). During the times of the Lithuanian SSR, the gymnasium was reorganized into an ordinary twelve-year secondary school. The gymnasium regained its historical name in 1996.

A school museum was established in 1967, on the 100th anniversary of the gymnasium. In 2011, it had about 7,000 exhibits. In 2002, the Memorial Museum of Vincas Mykolaitis-Putinas was moved to the gymnasium.

== Names ==
The gymnasium was known by various names under different regimes:

== Prominent alumni ==
Many prominent figures in Lithuanian politics, culture, and education graduated from Marijampolė Gymnasium. Among them were:

- Juozas Adomaitis-Šernas (1859–1922), writer
- Zigmas Angarietis (1882–1940), communist
- Saliamonas Banaitis (1866–1933), educator, banker
- Jonas Basanavičius (1851–1927), patriarch of the Lithuanian nation
- Kazys Boruta (1905–1965), writer
- Pranas Dovydaitis (1886–1942), politician, professor
- Algirdas Julien Greimas (1917–1992), linguist
- Kazys Grinius (1866–1950), President of Lithuania
- Jonas Jablonskis (1860–1930), linguist
- Petras Klimas (1891–1969), diplomat
- Vincas Kudirka (1858–1898), writer
- Juozas Montvila (1885–1912), Catholic priest who was a passenger of the Titanic during its sinking
- Jurgis Matulaitis-Matulevičius (1871–1927), bishop
- Vincas Mickevičius-Kapsukas (1880–1935), communist
- Vincas Mykolaitis-Putinas (1893–1967), writer
- Salomėja Nėris (1904–1945), poet
- Justinas Staugaitis (1866–1943), bishop
- Matas Šalčius (1890–1940), traveler, journalist
- Antanas Venclova (1906–1971), Soviet politician, writer
- Angelė Vyšniauskaitė (1919–2006), ethnologist, professor
- Jacob Gens (1903–1943), Indp. war veteran, Head of Vilna Ghetto
- Henryk Minkiewicz (1880–1940) a Polish socialist politician and a general of the Polish Army. Former commander of the Border Defence Corps, he was among the Polish officers murdered in the Katyń massacre
- Jerzy Jan Jastrzębski (1895–1944) a certified Polish colonel of the Polish Army cavalry, who died in the Battle of Monte Casino
- Romuald Minkiewicz (1878–1944) a Polish biologist, zoologist and botanist as well a writer, poet and social activist.
