= Pilviškiai =

- Town
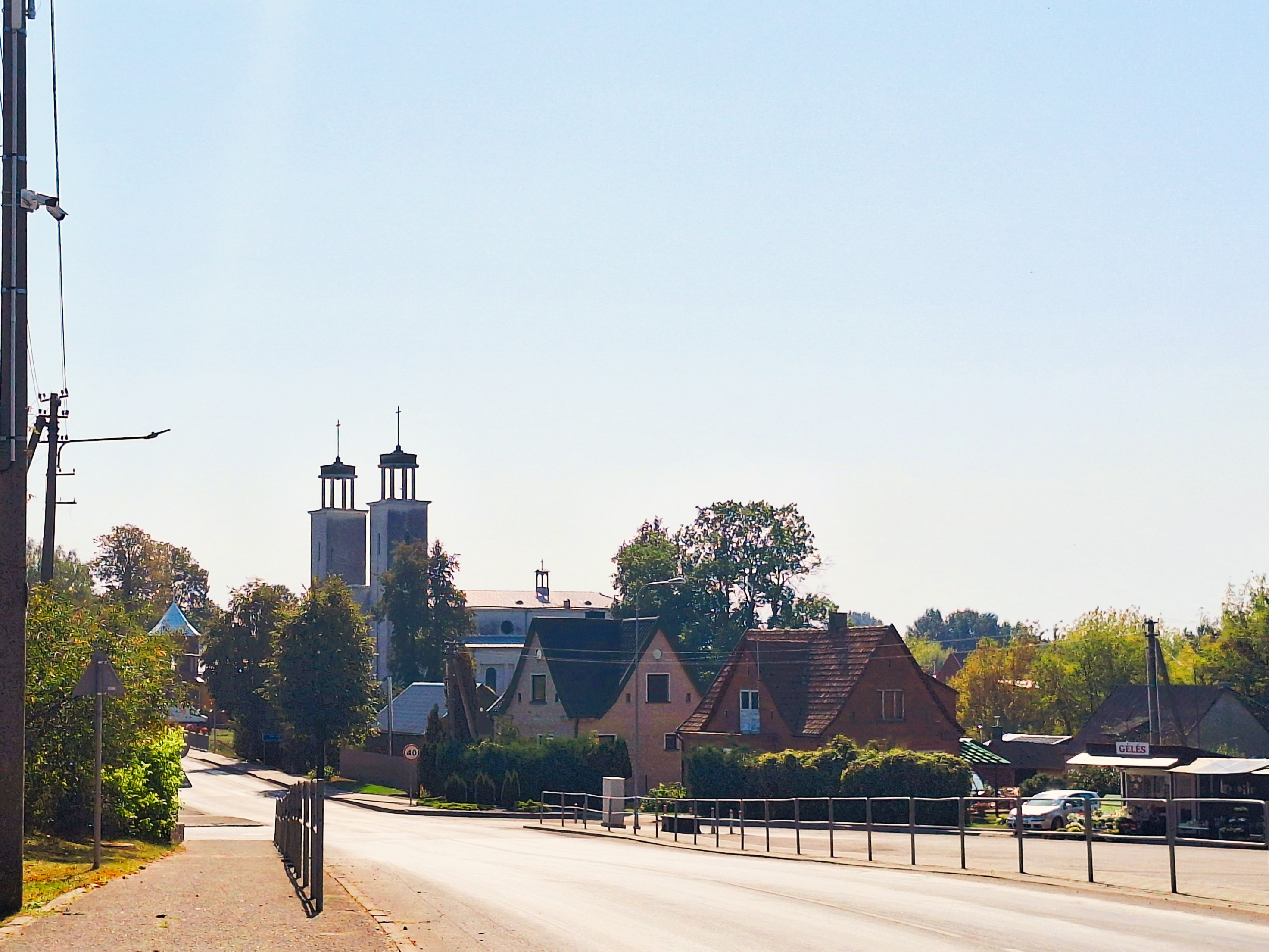
- View of Pilviškiai

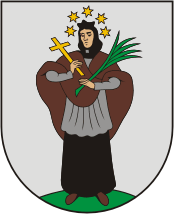
- Coat of arms

- Location in Lithuania
- Coordinates: 54°43′20″N 23°13′20″E
- Country: Lithuania
- County: Marijampolė County
- Municipality: Vilkaviškis district municipality

Population (2011)
  - Total: 2,305
- Time zone: UTC+2 (EET)
  - Summer (DST): UTC+3 (EEST)

Pilviškiai (Polish: Pilwiszki, Yiddish: פילווישאָק Pilveshok) is a town in Vilkaviškis district municipality and in Marijampolė County

== History ==
In the Jewish world, it was notable for being the first rabbinic post held by Rabbi Yechiel Yaakov Weinberg, who married and soon after divorced the daughter of the town's previous rabbi.

On 28–29 August 1941, the Jewish men of Pilviškiai district were shot in fields near Baltrušiai. The mass murder was perpetrated by an Einsatzgruppe of Germans and Pilviškiai self-defence police unit. The victims were about 300 to 350 Jewish men and several dozen Soviet activists (including a group of girls from the Communist Youth organization).

On 15 September 1941, approximately 700–800 women, children and elderly, were taken from Pilviškiai to the same execution site and murdered; some sources give a larger cumulative toll for Pilviškiai and nearby communities (up to ~1,800).

== Gallery ==
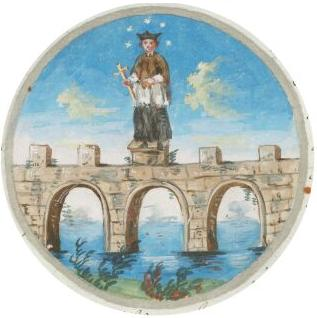
Old coat of arms

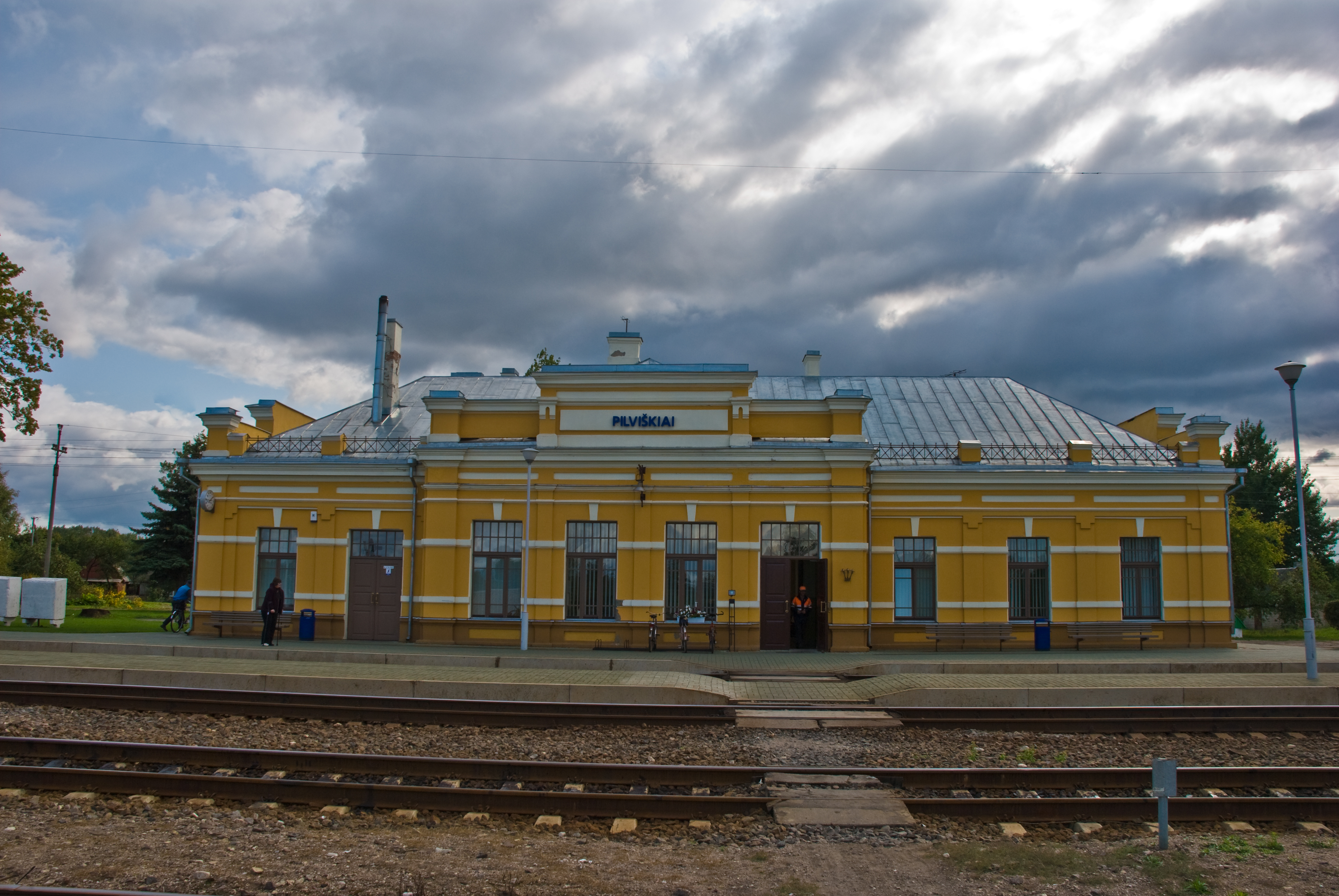
Railway station

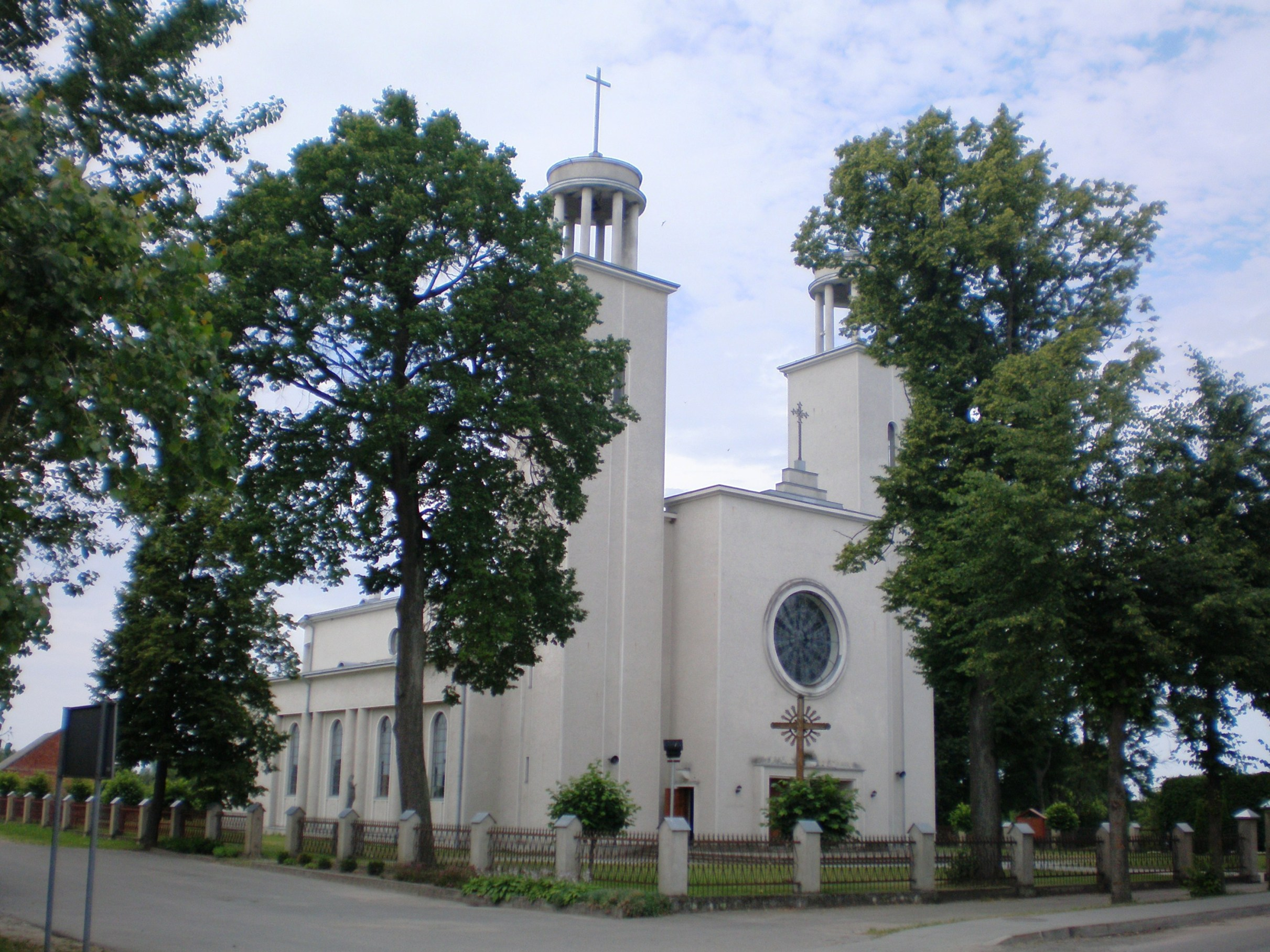

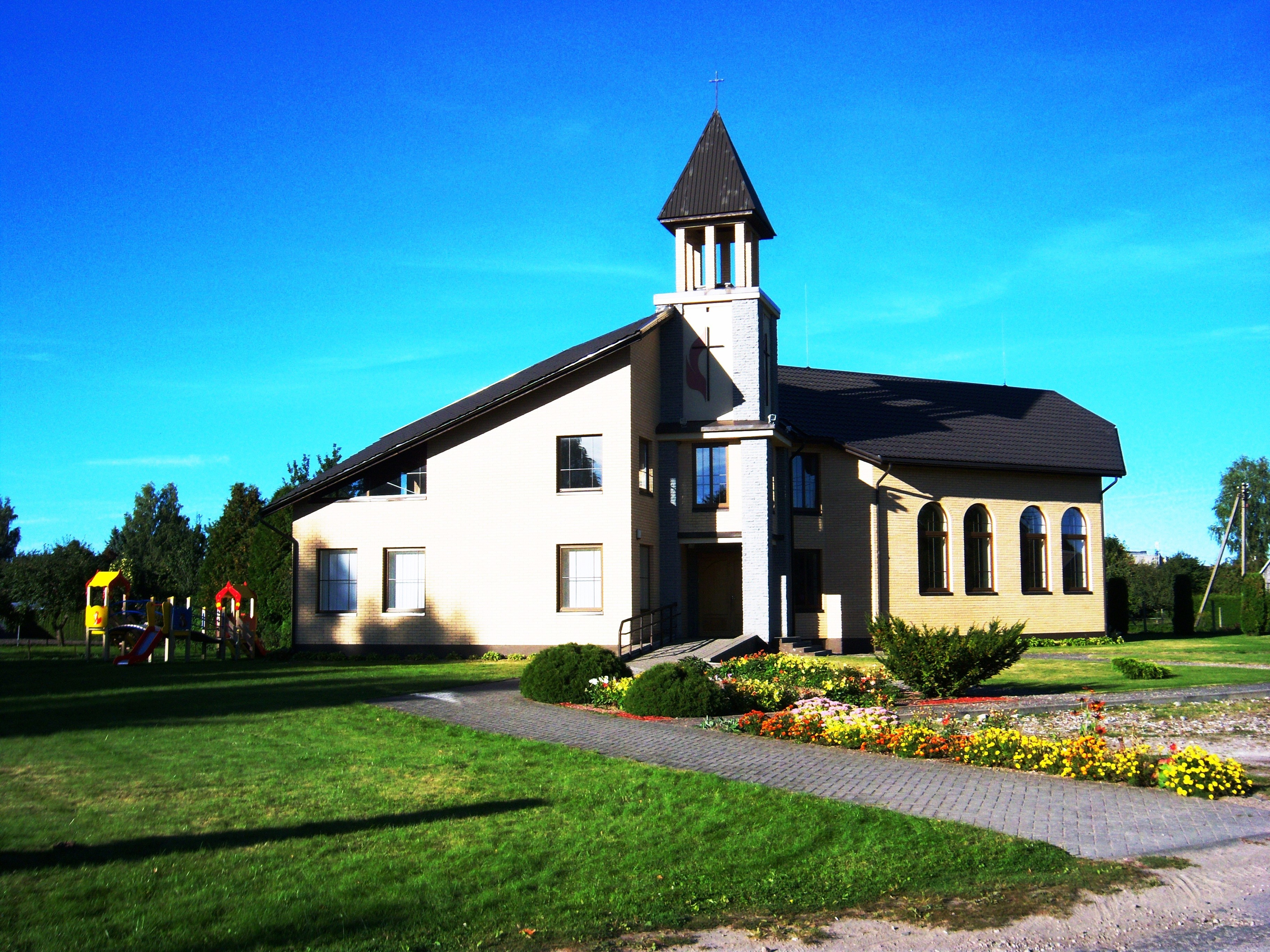
Methodist church

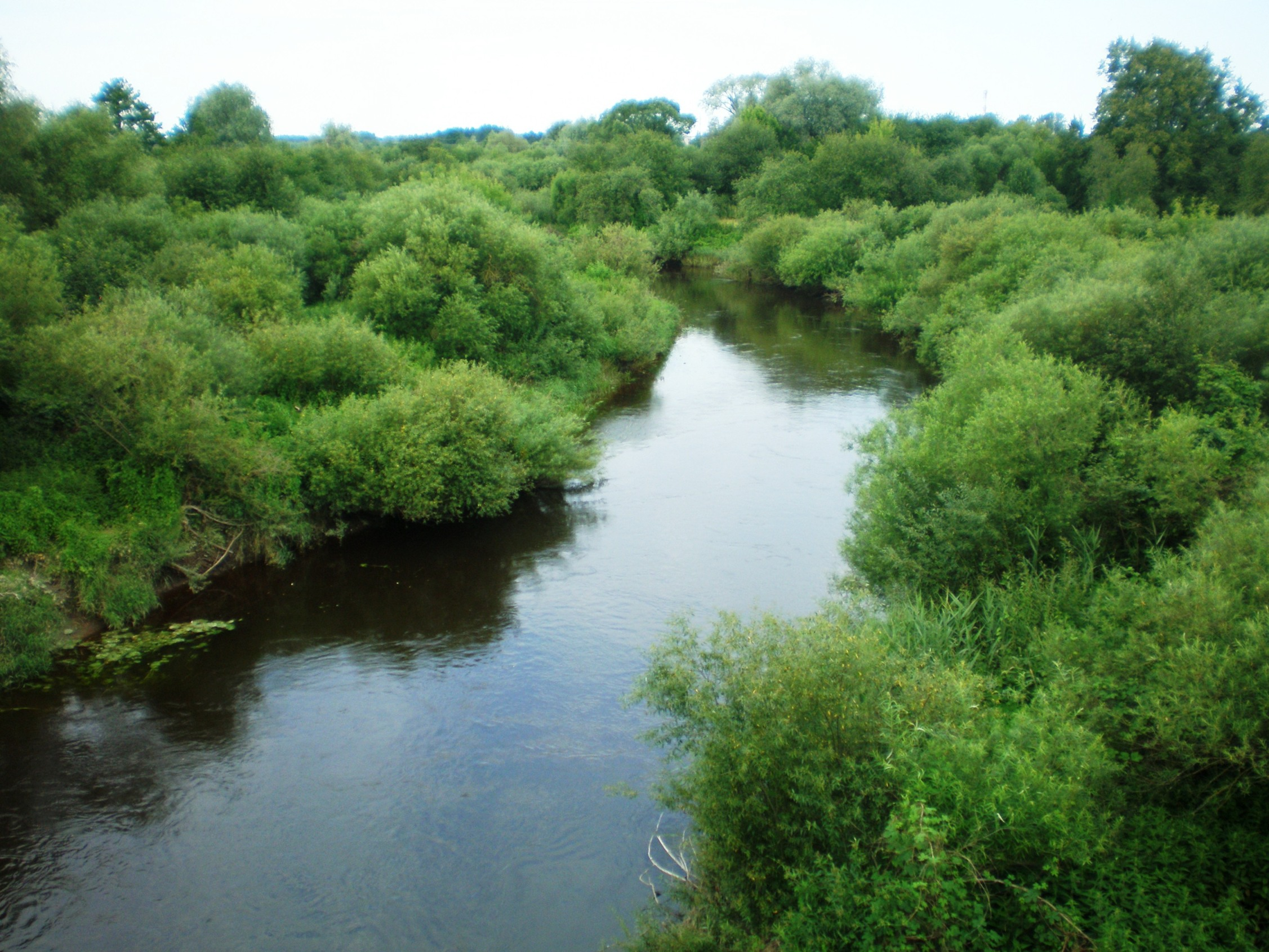
The Šešupė river near Pilviškiai
