= Šešupė =

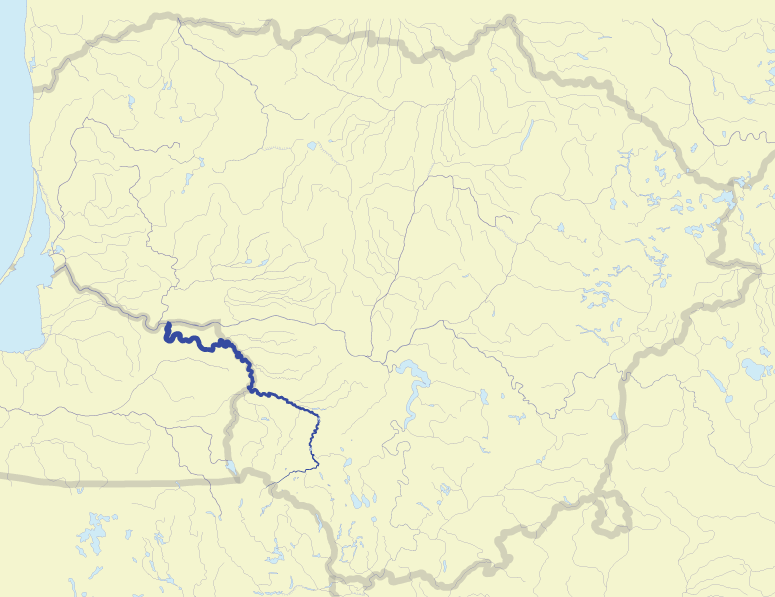
- Map of the Šešupė river

Location
- Country: Lithuania, Poland, Russia

Physical characteristics
- Source
  - location: 18 km north of Suwałki
- Mouth
  - location: Neman near Neman town
  - coordinates: 55°03′15″N 22°12′01″E
- Length: 298 km (185 mi)
- Basin size: 6,105 km^{2} (2,357 sq mi)
- Discharge
  - average: 18 m^{3}/s (640 cu ft/s) (near Kudirkos Naumiestis)

Basin features
- Progression: Neman→ Baltic Sea
- Tributaries
  - left: Rausvė, Širvinta
  - right: Szelmentka, Dovinė, Pilvė, Višakis, Nova, Siesartis

The Šešupė (pronounced [ˈʃɛːʃʊːpeː]); Russian: Шешупе; Polish: Szeszupa; German: Scheschup(p)e, Ostfluss) is a 298 km long river that flows through Poland (27 km), Lithuania (158 km), and Russia (62 km). The river flows for 51 km along the border between the Kaliningrad Oblast, an exclave of Russia, and Lithuania. The Šešupė originates near the Polish village of Szeszupka, about 16 km from the Polish-Lithuanian border, and flows into the Nemunas, near the town of Neman, on the border between Lithuania and Kaliningrad Oblast.

Major towns and cities along the river, from the Nemunas to the source, are: Kudirkos Naumiestis, Pilviškiai, Marijampolė, and Kalvarija.

There are parts of Kaliningrad and Lithuania that are on the opposite side of the river, including a small island that is mostly Russian but has an area belonging to Lithuania.

The Šešupė is the fourth-longest river in Lithuania.

- Left tributaries: Sūduonia, Rausvė, Širvinta, Alksnupė (Staraya; Russian: Старая).
- Right tributaries: Šelmenta, Kirsna, Dovinė, Sasna, Pilvė, Višakis, Milupė, Nenupė, Nova, Aukspirta, Siesartis, Jotija.

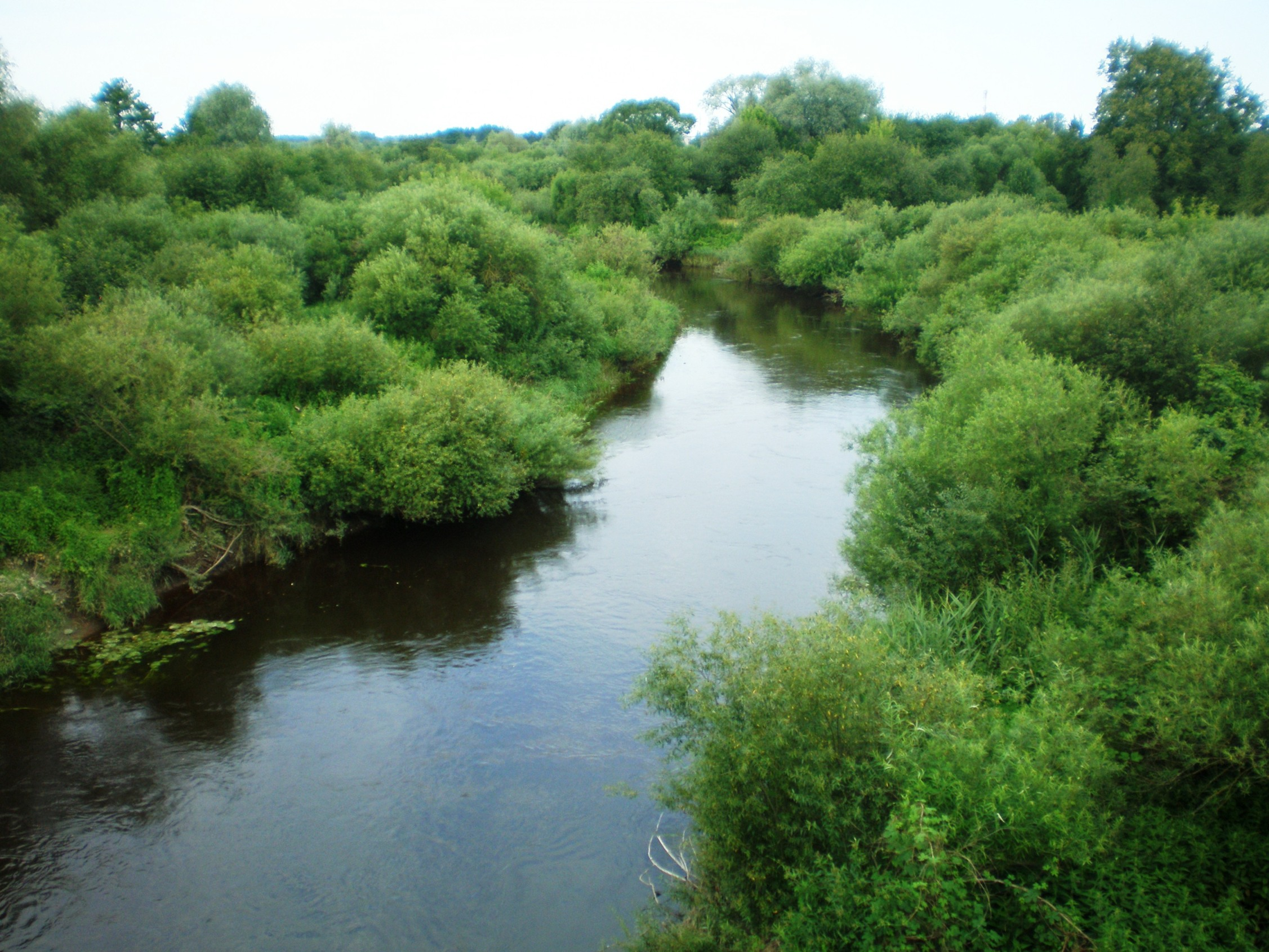
The Šešupė river near Pilviškiai

== Etymology ==
Upė means river in Lithuanian, whereas the etymology of the first part Šeš- is uncertain. There are several suggestions: from šešelis: 'shadow'/'shade'; archaic stem for 'cold', 'cool'; šeše: 'quiet'. Vincas Urbutis suggests derivation from dialectal šėšė, šešis for 'blackbird', also suggesting Old Prussian influence.
