= Kazys Boruta =

Lithuanian writer and politician (1905–1965)

Kazys Boruta (6 January 1905 – 9 March 1965) was a Lithuanian writer, poet, translator and political activist. He was one of the founders of the literary magazine Trečias frontas and is best known for the novels Mediniai stebuklai and Baltaragio malūnas.

== Biography ==
Boruta was born in Kūlokai, near Marijampolė, in what was then the Russian Empire. Because of his radical political views, he was expelled from the Marijampolė teachers' seminary in 1924 and from the University of Lithuania in 1925. He later studied history, literature and philosophy in Kaunas, Vienna and Berlin, and in 1927 moved to Latvia, where he published the literary almanac Audra in Riga.

In the 1920s and early 1930s, Boruta was active in left-wing political and literary circles. According to later scholarship, he was drawn to forms of socialism that emphasized personal freedom, rejected Bolshevik Marxism, and helped shape the program of the magazine Trečias frontas before distancing himself from its increasingly doctrinaire politics. He returned to Lithuania in 1931, prepared the almanac Darbas in 1932, and in 1933 was arrested and sentenced to four years in prison; he was amnestied in 1935.

Boruta edited the magazine Dienovidis in 1940 and served as head of the Literature Museum of the Lithuanian Academy of Sciences in 1941 and again in 1945–46. During the German occupation he helped preserve collections of Lithuanian manuscripts and also assisted Jews. After the Second World War he took part in anti-Soviet resistance activities, was expelled from the Writers' Union in 1946, arrested by Soviet security organs, and sentenced to five years' imprisonment; he was amnestied in 1949 and readmitted to the union in 1957. For a long period in Soviet Lithuania, his own work was not published, and he supported himself in part through translations issued under pseudonyms.

== Works ==
Boruta began publishing poetry in 1920. His early verse collections included A-lo! (1925), Dainos apie svyruojančius gluosnius (1927), Kryžių Lietuva (1927) and Duona kasdieninė (1934). Critics have associated this poetry with rebellious moods, a longing for freedom, expressionist imagery and an avant-garde style mixed with lyrical rural landscapes.

His early prose included the novella Namas Nr. 13 and the short-story collection Drumstas arimų vėjas, both published in 1928, and the novella Saulę ant savo pečių parnešti išėjo (1940). His best-known prose works are Mediniai stebuklai (1938) and Baltaragio malūnas (1945; revised edition 1962), which are regarded as important early examples of the Lithuanian poetic novel. Baltaragio malūnas, written largely during the German occupation, drew on Lithuanian folklore about conflict between man and the devil and remained Boruta's most famous work.

Boruta also wrote documentary prose, including Kelionės į šiaurę (1938–39), a fictionalized biography of the sculptor Vincas Grybas titled Sunkūs paminklai (1960), the fairy-tale collection Dangus griūva (1955), and the humorous novella Jurgio Paketurio klajonės (1963). He also translated works by Pearl S. Buck, Henrik Ibsen, Aleksey Tolstoy, Friedrich Schiller, William Shakespeare and others into Lithuanian.
