= Klinavas =

Village in Lithuania

- Village
- Location within Lithuania
- Coordinates: 54°22′39″N 23°2′3″E
- Country: Lithuania
- County: Marijampolė County
- Municipality: Kalvarija Municipality
- Eldership: Liubavas Eldership

Population (2011)
  - Total: 9
- Time zone: UTC+2 (EET)
  - Summer (DST): UTC+3 (EEST)

Klinavas (Polish: Klinowo) is a village in the Liubavas Eldership, Kalvarija Municipality, Marijampolė County, in southern Lithuania, near the border with Poland.

== History ==
The village formed part of the Trakai Voivodeship of the Polish–Lithuanian Commonwealth until it was annexed by Prussia in the Third Partition of Poland in 1795. In 1807, it became part of the short-lived Polish Duchy of Warsaw, and after its dissolution it became part of Russian-controlled Congress Poland in 1815.

With the end of World War I, Poland and Lithuania regained independence as separate countries, and the settlement was disputed. Local Poles petitioned for the settlement to be included within the Suwałki County of Poland. The Poles along with inhabitants of several other villages (including Liubavas (Lubowo) and Reketija (Rykacieje)) established a commune headed by wójt Aleksander Filipowicz. In February 1919, the Lithuanians dissolved the local Polish authorities, introduced martial law and arrested Filipowicz.

During World War II, it was occupied by the Soviet Union from 1940, then by Nazi Germany from 1941, and then re-occupied by the Soviet Union in 1944.
