= Alis Vidūnas =

Lithuanian politician (1934–2009)

Alis Vidūnas (November 8, 1934 in the village of Reketija, Kalvarija Municipality – February 19, 2009 in Vilnius) was a Lithuanian politician. 1952–1958 he studied at Kaunas Politechnical Institute, Faculty of Hydrotechnology and received profession of an engineer. April 10, 1995 – January 21, 1997, he was mayor of Vilnius, January 15, 1997 – November 15, 2000, head of Vilnius region. Since 2001 he was marketing director in Greitkelis Ltd.

His wife, Gražina Vidūnienė, is an economist. His son is Vytis Vidūnas is a Sanskrit professor and the former head of the Centre of Oriental Studies at Vilnius University.
