= Liubavas =

Village in Lithuania

- Village
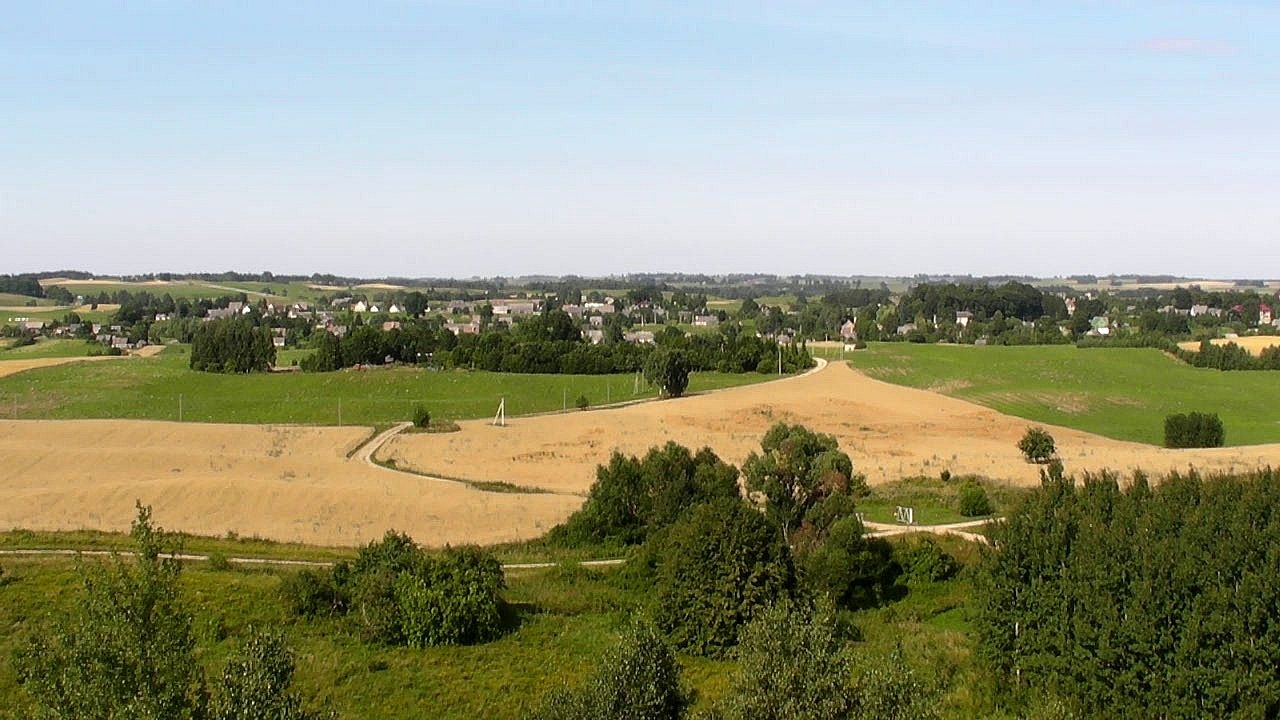

- Location within Lithuania
- Coordinates: 54°22′0″N 23°2′10″E
- Country: Lithuania
- County: Marijampolė County
- Municipality: Kalvarija Municipality
- Eldership: Liubavas Eldership

Population (2011)
  - Total: 242
- Time zone: UTC+2 (EET)
  - Summer (DST): UTC+3 (EEST)

Liubavas (Polish: Lubowo) is a village in the Liubavas Eldership, Kalvarija Municipality, Marijampolė County, in southern Lithuania, near the border with Poland.

== History ==
It was granted town rights by King and Grand Duke Augustus III in 1734. The local parish church was built in 1770. The town was annexed by Prussia in the Third Partition of Polish-Lithuanian Commonwealth in 1795. In 1807, it became part of the short-lived Napoleonic Duchy of Warsaw, and after its dissolution it became part of Russian Congress Poland in 1815. As of 1827, the town had a population of 812. Town rights were revoked in the mid-19th century.

With the end of World War I, Poland and Lithuania regained independence as separate countries, and the settlement was disputed. Local Poles petitioned for the settlement to be included within the Suwałki County of Poland. The Poles along with inhabitants of several other villages (including Klinavas (Klinowo) and Reketija (Rykacieje)) established a commune headed by wójt Aleksander Filipowicz. In February 1919, the Lithuanians dissolved the local Polish authorities, introduced martial law and arrested Filipowicz.

The village features a monument to Lithuanian independence, erected in 1929 to commemorate Lithuanians who were killed by Polish partisans.

During World War II, it was occupied by the Soviet Union from 1940, then by Nazi Germany from 1941, and then re-occupied by the Soviet Union in 1944.
