= Cathedral of the Blessed Virgin Mary =

Cathedral of the Blessed Virgin Mary might refer to:

- Cathedral of the Blessed Virgin Mary, Bogor, Indonesia
- Cathedral of the Blessed Virgin Mary, Hamilton, New Zealand
- Cathedral of the Blessed Virgin Mary, Lincoln, England
- Cathedral of the Blessed Virgin Mary, Minsk, Belarus
- Cathedral of the Blessed Virgin Mary, Odesa, Ukraine
- Cathedral of the Blessed Virgin Mary, Płock, Poland
- Cathedral of the Blessed Virgin Mary, Salisbury, England
- Cathedral of the Blessed Virgin Mary, Truro, England
- Cathedral of the Blessed Virgin Mary, Vilkaviškis, Lithuania
