= Akmenynai Eldership =

Eldership in the Kalvarija Municipality, Lithuania

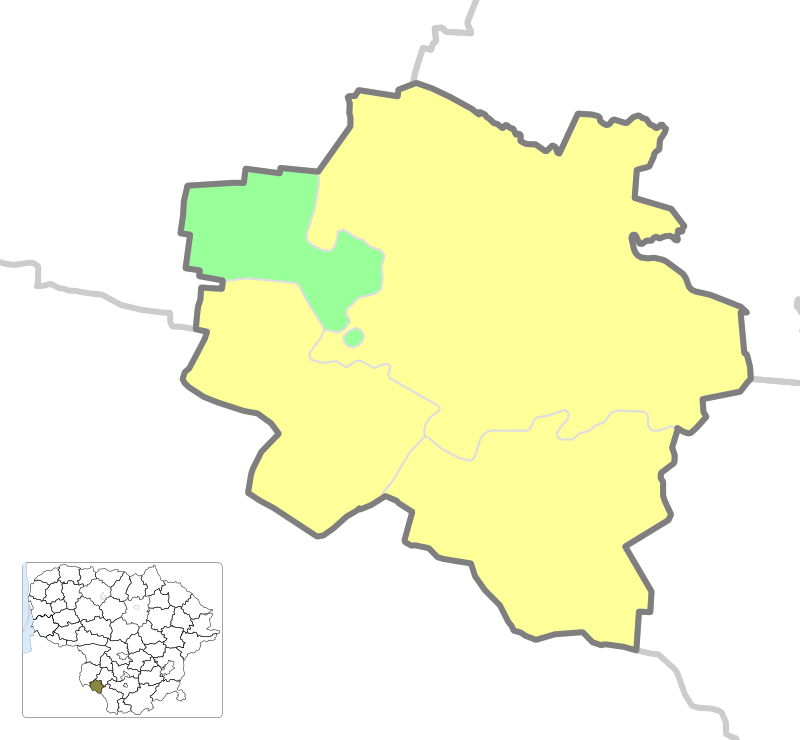
Location of Akmenynai Eldership in Kalvarija Municipality.

The Akmenynai Eldership (Lithuanian: Akmenynų seniūnija) is an eldership of Lithuania, located in the Kalvarija Municipality. In 2021 its population was 545.
