= Sangrūda Eldership =

Eldership of Lithuania

The Sangrūda Eldership (Lithuanian: Sangrūdos seniūnija) is an eldership of Lithuania, located in the Kalvarija Municipality. In 2021 its population was 1191.
