= Marijampolė County =

County of Lithuania

Coordinates: 54°33′31″N 23°20′58″E

Marijampolė County Marijampolės apskritis
- County
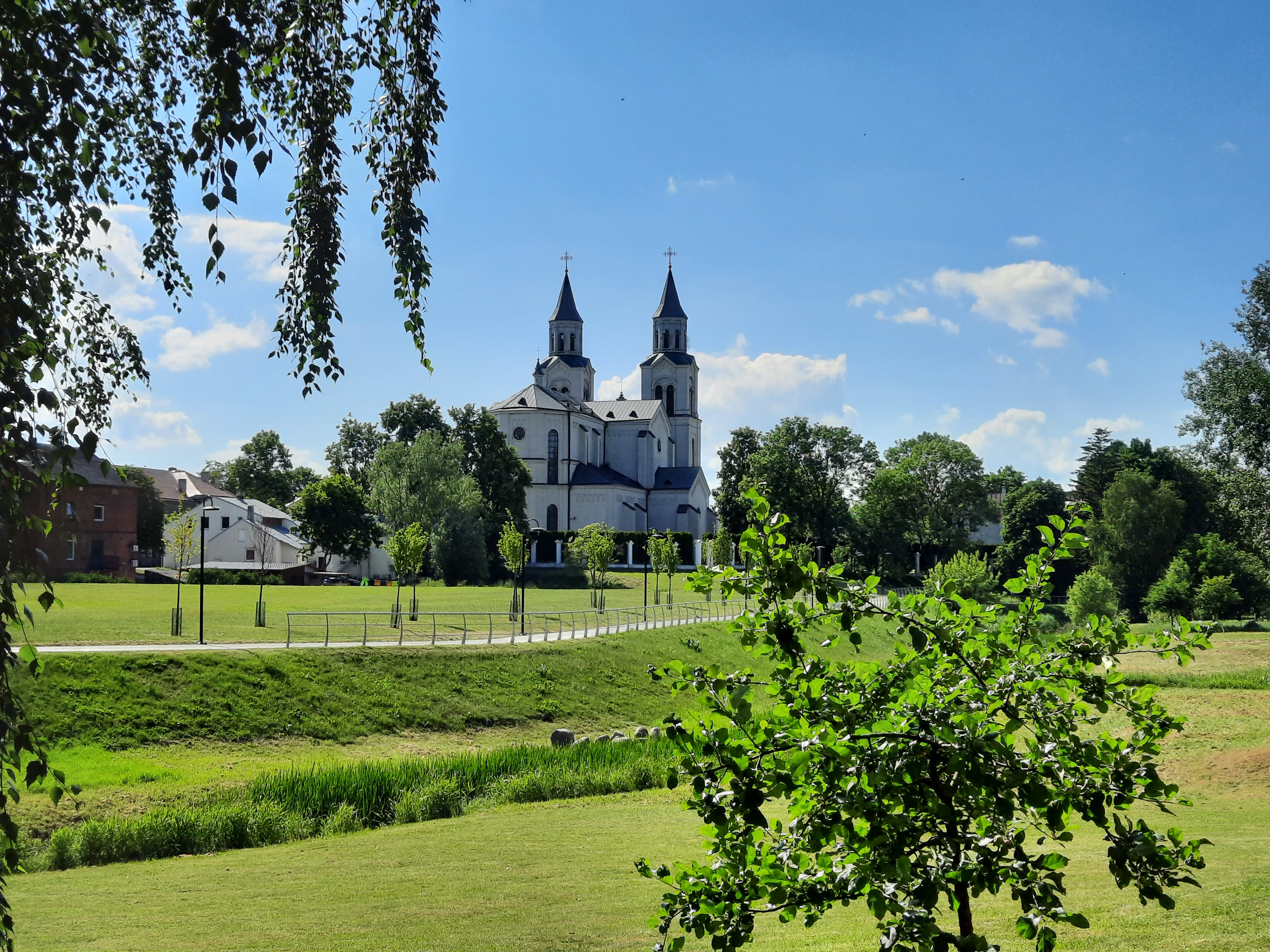
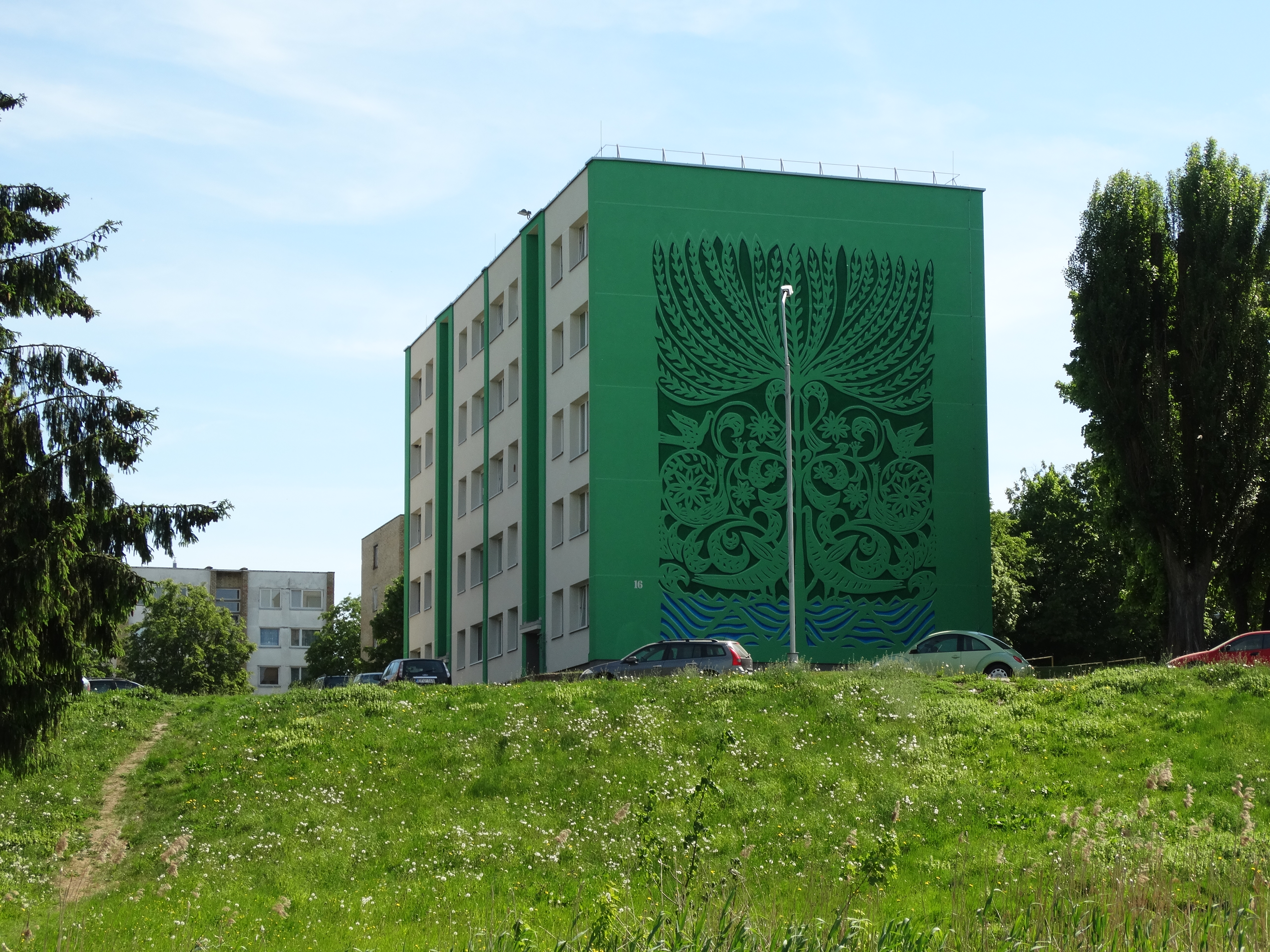
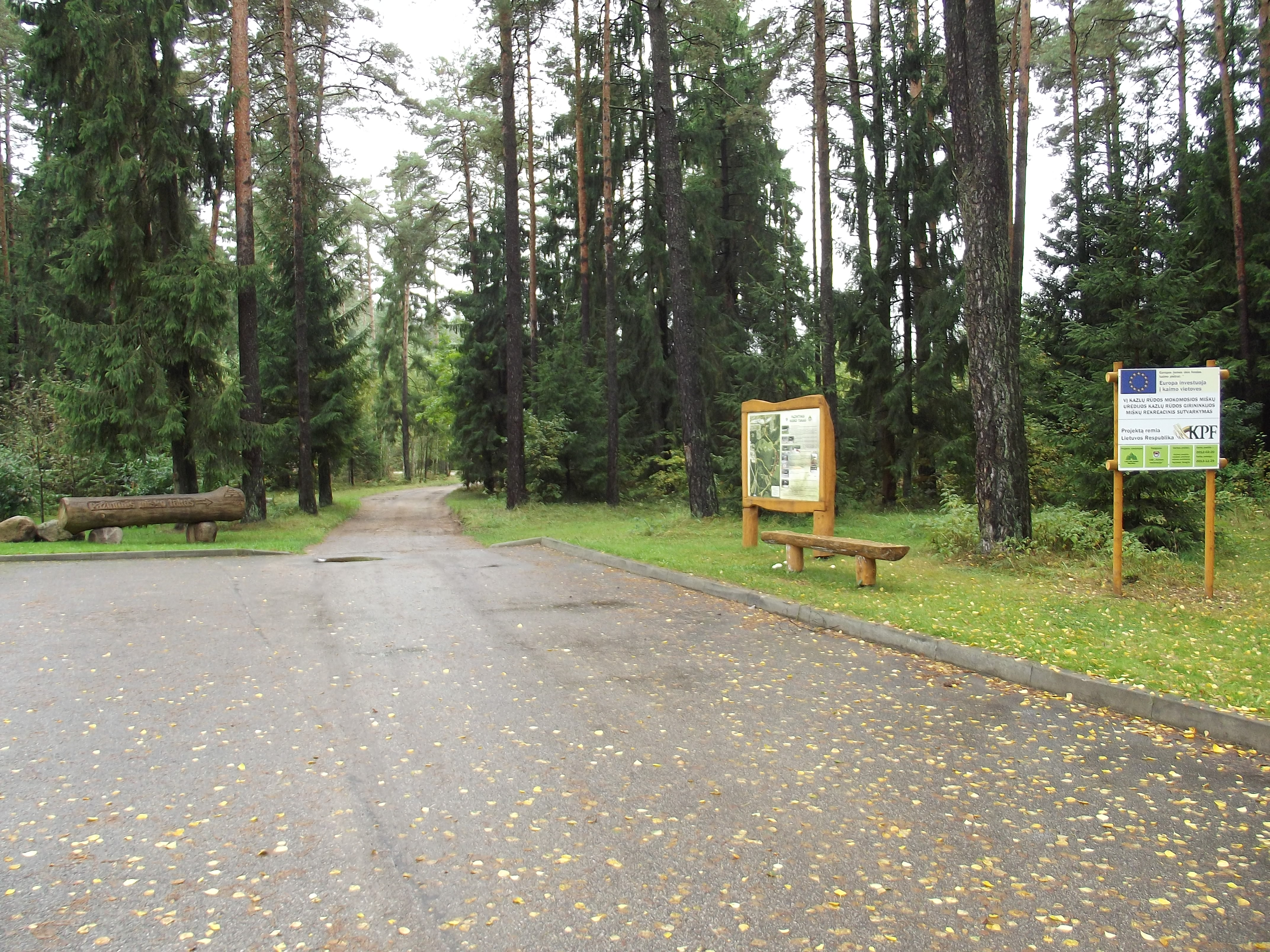
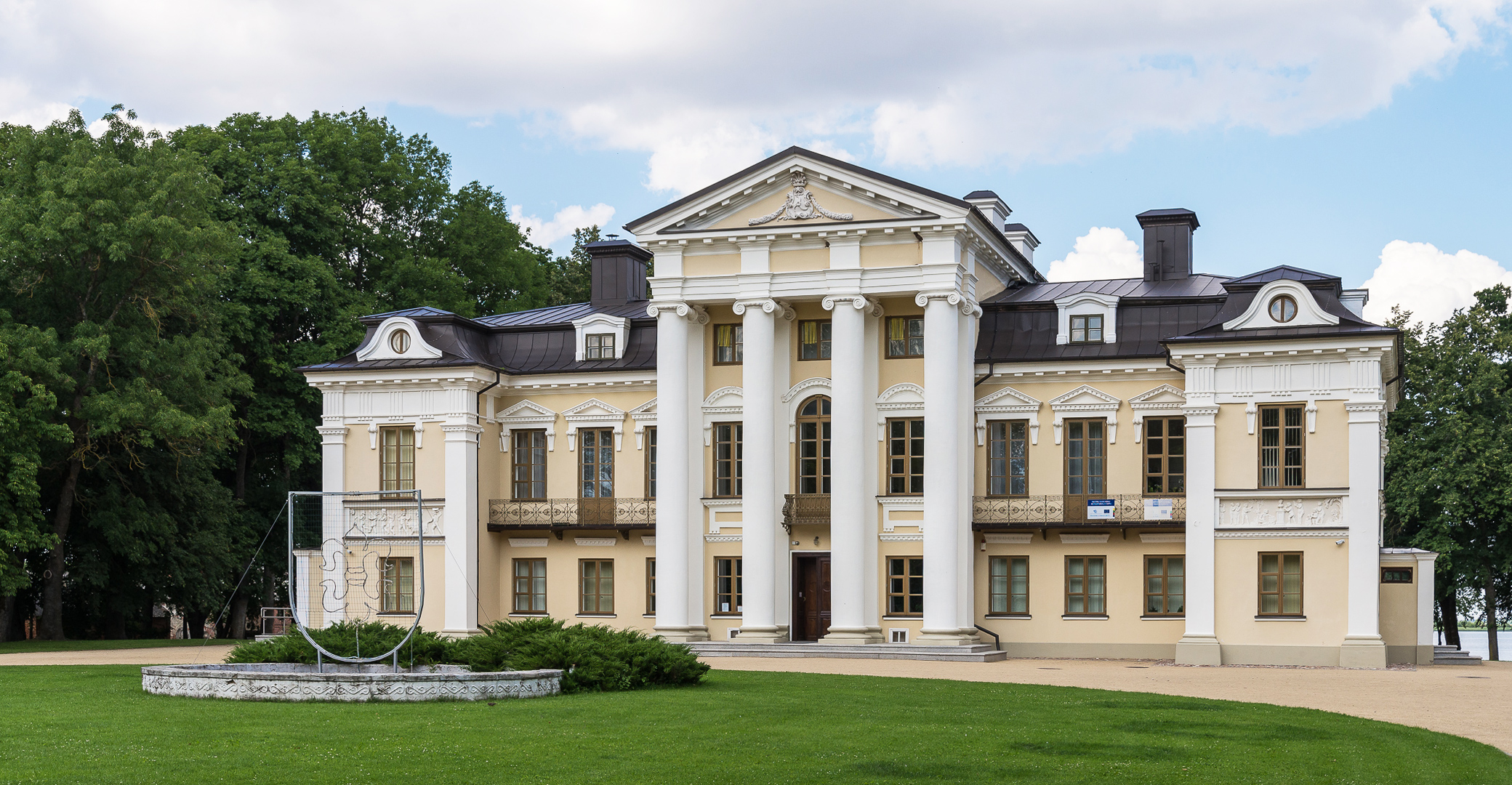
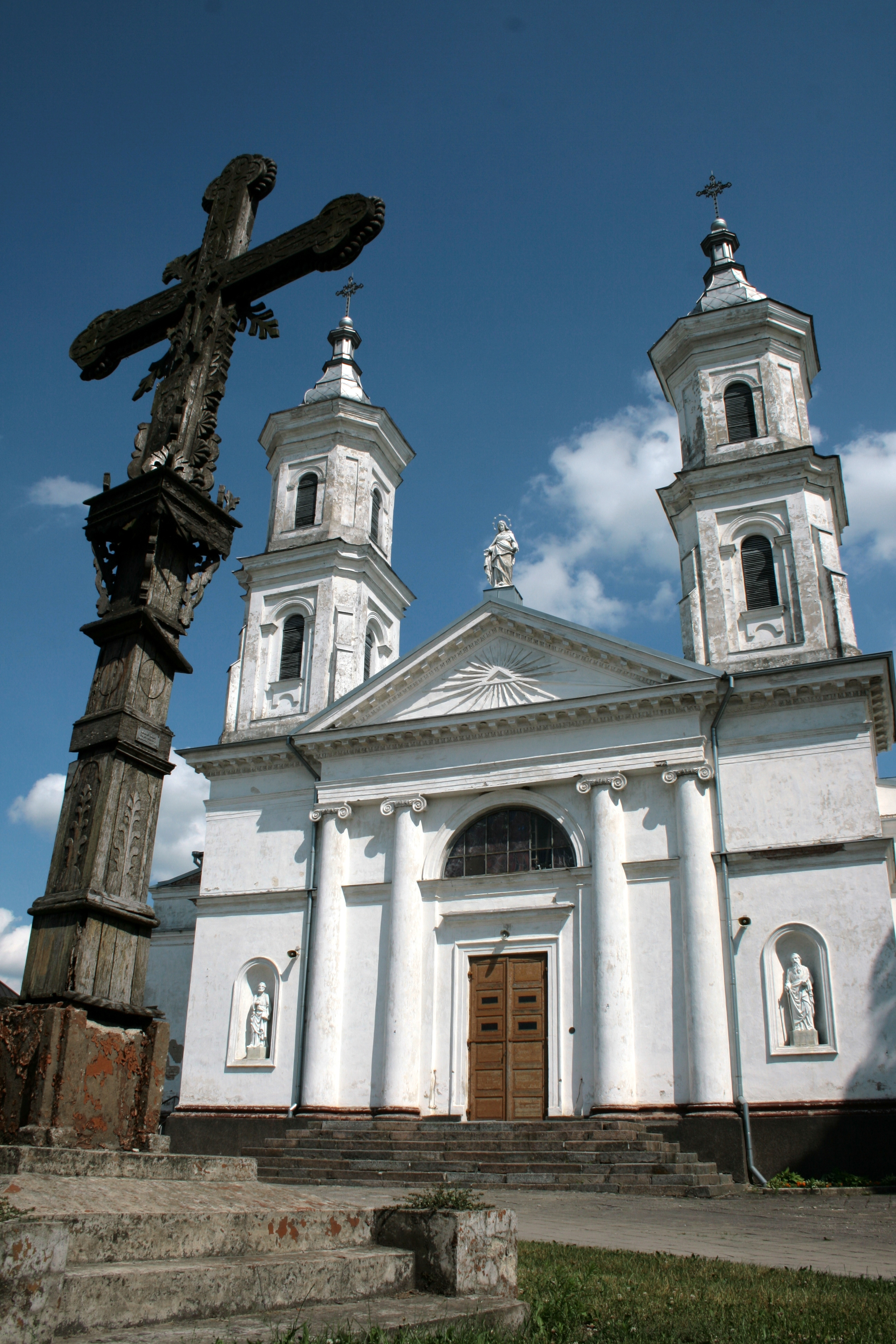
- Vilkaviškis Cathedral Street art of Marijampolė Forests of Kazlų Rūda Paežeriai Manor Church in Kalvarija

- Flag Coat of arms

- Location of Marijampolė County
- Interactive map of Marijampolė County
- Country: Lithuania
- Administrative centre: Marijampolė
- Municipalities: List: Kalvarija municipality; Kazlų Rūda municipality; Marijampolė municipality; Šakiai district municipality; Vilkaviškis district municipality

Area
  - Total: 4,466 km^{2} (1,724 sq mi)
- (6.8% of the area of Lithuania)

Population (2016-01-20)
  - Total: 136,671
  - Rank: 6th of 10 (5.4% of the population of Lithuania)
  - Density: 30.60/km^{2} (79.26/sq mi)

GDP
  - Total: €2.0 billion (2023) · 7th
- Time zone: UTC+2 (EET)
  - Summer (DST): UTC+3 (EEST)
- ISO 3166 code: LT-MR
- HDI (2022): 0.835 very high · 9th

Marijampolė County (Lithuanian: Marijampolės apskritis) is one of the ten counties in Lithuania. It is in the southwest of the country and roughly corresponds to the historical region of Sudovia. Its capital and the largest town is Marijampolė. On 1 July 2010, the county administration was abolished, and since that date, Marijampolė County remains as a territorial and statistical unit.

It borders the Tauragė County in the north, Kaunas County and Alytus County in the east, Podlaskie Voivodeship of Poland in the south, and Kaliningrad Oblast of Russia in the west.

== History ==
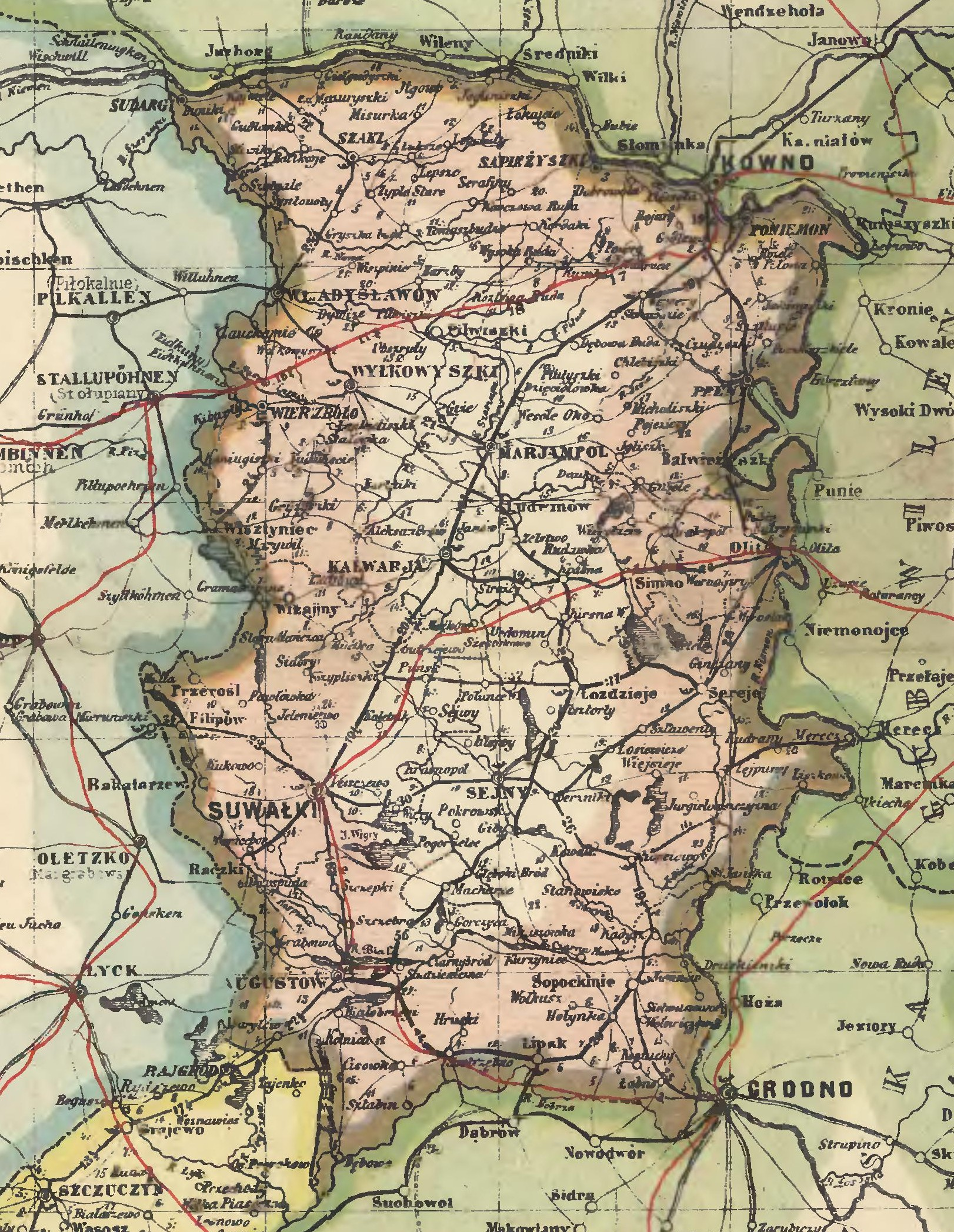
Suwałki Governorate in 1911

The county includes part of the ancient Sudovian lands. After the long fights with the Teutonic Order in the late 13th - 14th centuries, most of the old inhabitants of Sudovia were decimated and the land was ravaged. Sudovia began to recover in the late 15th century, when settlers from various parts of Grand Duchy of Lithuania began to occupy former Sudovian lands. The close proximity to Poland and Prussia allowed the new settlers to establish close trade links.

During the Kościuszko Uprising, in 1794, Vilkaviškis was the site of a battle between Polish insurgents and Prussian troops. After the Third Partition of the Polish–Lithuanian Commonwealth in 1795, Sudovia became part of Prussia. The former established the Marijampolė County, which was initially called Starapolė-Senapilė County.

In 1807, it became part of the short-lived Polish Duchy of Warsaw, and after its dissolution in 1815, the region became part of newly established Congress Poland, which was under Russian rule. It was successively part of the administrative units of Łomża Department, Augustów Voivodeship, Augustów Governorate, and Suwałki Governorate. It was the place of multiple battles of the November and January Uprisings against Russian rule.

During the years of Lithuanian press ban, Sudovia was an important route for Knygnešiai (Lithuanian book smugglers) due to the region's proximity to the border of Lithuania Minor, where Lithuanian press was still legal at the time. From here, the banned press spread throughout Lithuania proper. In 1894, the Sudovian book smugglers, in an effort to mobilize their forces, to obtain and distribute the Lithuanian press on a regular basis, founded the secret Society of the Sietynas in Marijampolė.

After 123 years, Sudovia returned to Lithuanian administration after World War I, the collapse of the Russian Empire and the withdrawal of the occupying German army. In 1918–1919, the southern outskirts with Vištytis, Liubavas, Klinavas and Reketija were disputed by newly reestablished Poland, with local Poles forming Polish communes, which, however, were forcibly dissolved by Lithuanian forces.

During World War II, it was occupied by the Soviet Union from 1940, and by Nazi Germany in 1941-1944, when it was part of the Kaunas Regional District. The county was abolished in 1950.

Marijampolė County was reconstituted in 1994 as an administrative-territorial unit comprising several municipalities. The coat of arms of Marijampolė County was adopted in 2004. On 1 July 2010, the county administration was abolished and its functions were transferred to municipalities and ministries, while the county itself remained a territorial unit.

== Climate ==
Marijampolė County has a Warm Summer Continental or Hemiboreal climate (Dfb) according to the Köppen climate classification system, which is characterized by warm to hot (and often humid) summers and long and frosty winters. The region is one of the warmest in Lithuania, with the average temperature in July being 18.5 °C (65 °F). The average temperature in a year is 7.5 °C (46 °F).

Climate data for Kybartai
Month	Jan	Feb	Mar	Apr	May	Jun	Jul	Aug	Sep	Oct	Nov	Dec	Year
Record high °C (°F)	12 (54)	16.5 (61.7)	21.8 (71.2)	24 (75)	30 (86)	33.4 (92.1)	34.7 (94.5)	32 (90)	28 (82)	26 (79)	18 (64)	11 (52)	34.7 (94.5)
Daily mean °C (°F)	−2.4 (27.7)	−1.8 (28.8)	1.6 (34.9)	7.8 (46.0)	13 (55)	16.3 (61.3)	18.5 (65.3)	18 (64)	13.3 (55.9)	7.9 (46.2)	3.2 (37.8)	−0.6 (30.9)	7.9 (46.2)
Record low °C (°F)	−34 (−29)	−25 (−13)	−23 (−9)	−7 (19)	−3 (27)	1 (34)	5 (41)	2 (36)	−4 (25)	−10 (14)	−16 (3)	−26 (−15)	−34 (−29)
Source: Lietuvos hidrometeorologijos tarnyba

== Subdivisions ==
Marijampolė County is divided into 5 municipalities which are further divided into 42 elderships (seniūnija). The largest municipality is Šakiai District Municipality, while the most populous is Marijampolė Municipality.

The municipalities are listed in the following table (in alphabetical order).

Municipality	Population (2021)	Area (km^{2})	Seat	Other towns	Total seniūnijas
Kalvarija Municipality	9,927	440	Kalvarija	Jungėnai, Sangrūda, Liubavas	4
Kazlų Rūda Municipality	11,054	555	Kazlų Rūda	Antanavas, Jūrė, Bagotoji	4
Marijampolė Municipality	54,846	755	Marijampolė	Puskelniai, Liudvinavas, Igliauka	8
Šakiai District Municipality	26,931	1,453	Šakiai	Gelgaudiškis, Kudirkos Naumiestis, Lukšiai	14
Vilkaviškis District Municipality	35,368	1,259	Vilkaviškis	Kybartai, Pilviškiai, Virbalis	12

== Cities ==
1. Marijampolė
2. Vilkaviškis
3. Kazlų Rūda
4. Šakiai
5. Kalvarija
6. Kybartai
7. Gelgaudiškis
8. Kudirkos Naumiestis

== Education ==
The chief and only university of the county is Marijampolė University of Applied Sciences, while Marijampolė Vocational Training Centre is the chief vocational school in the region.

== Gallery ==
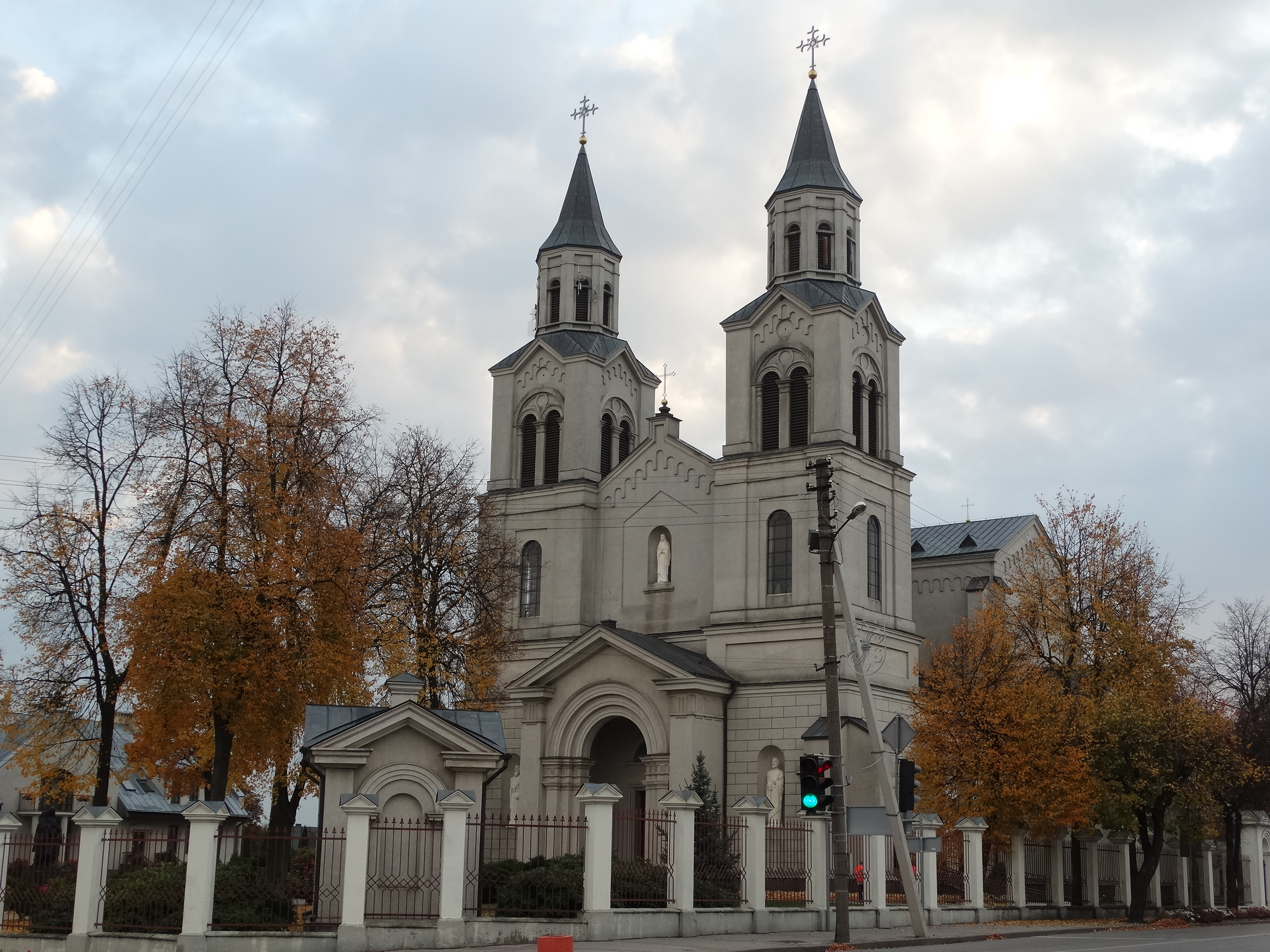
Vilkaviškis Cathedral

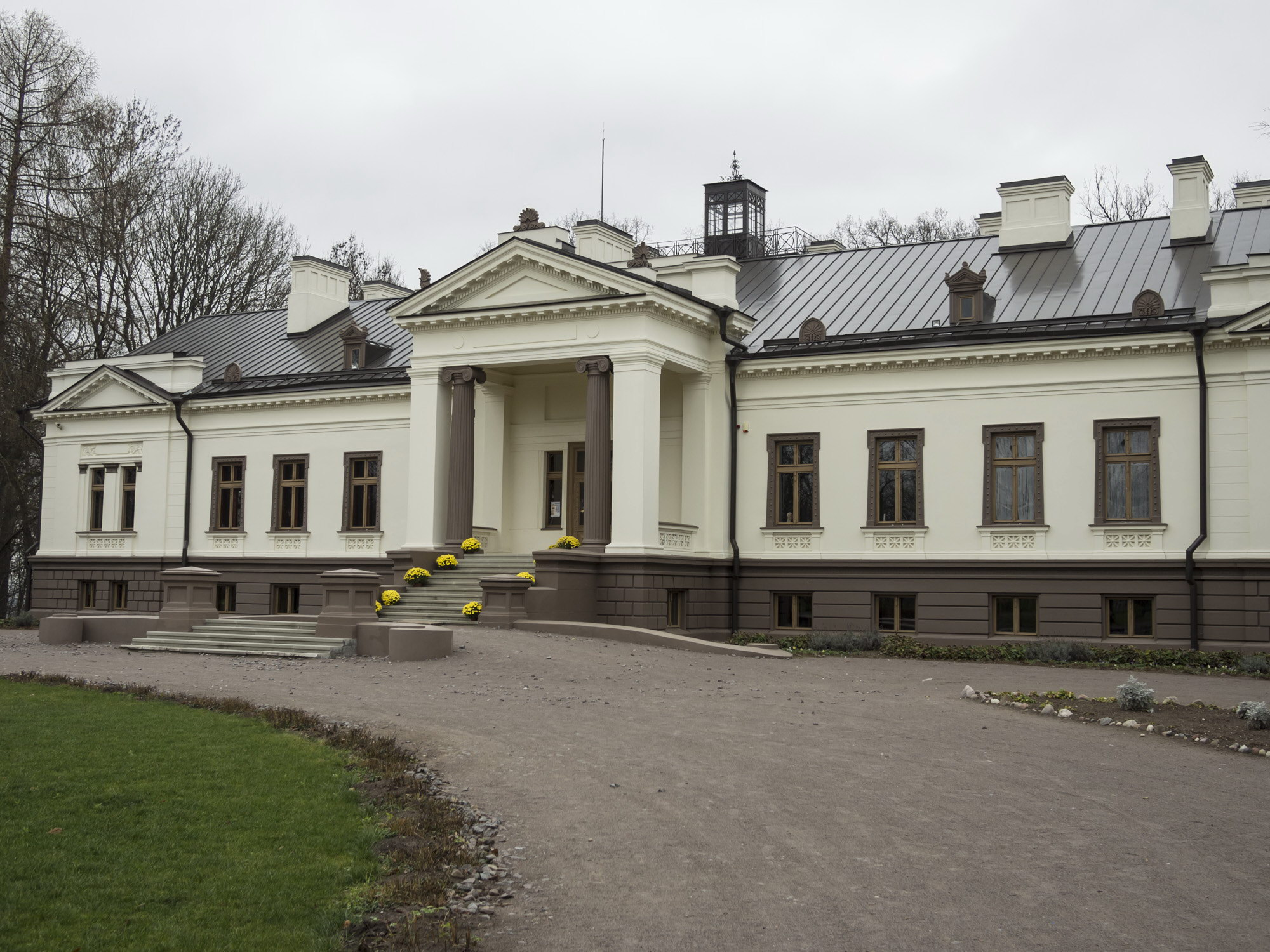
Gelgaudiškis Manor

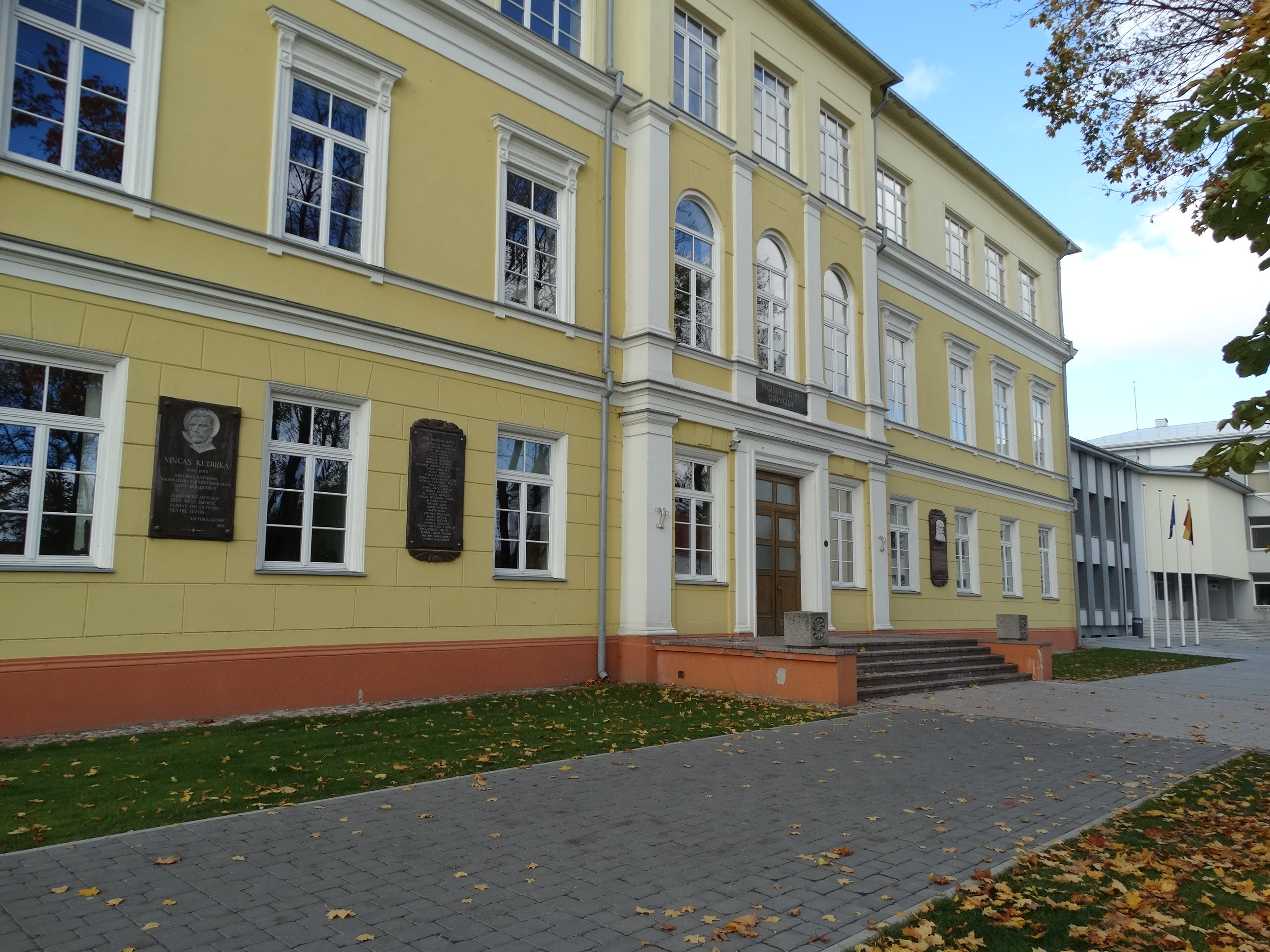
Gymnasium in Marijampolė

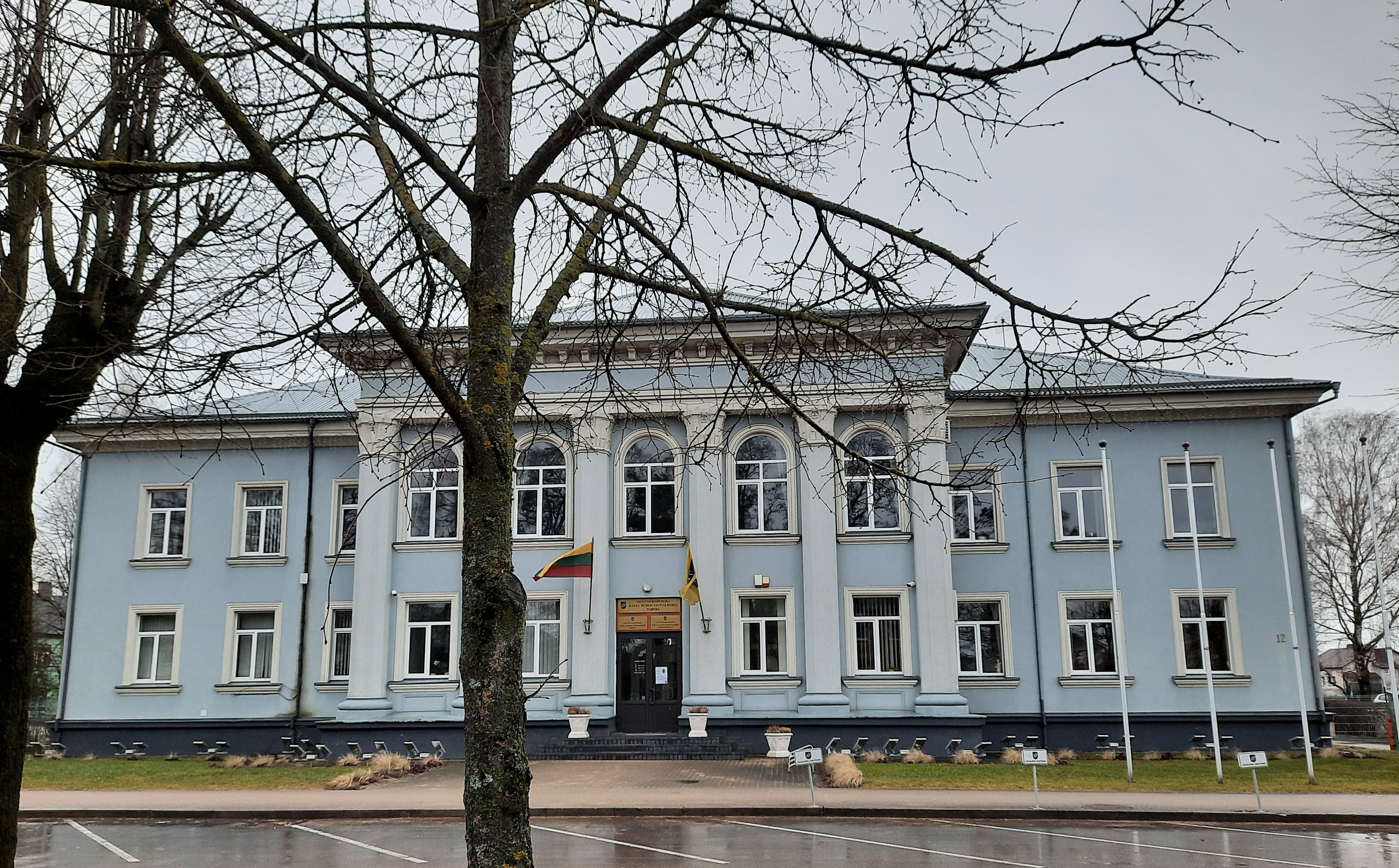
Town Hall in Kazlų Rūda

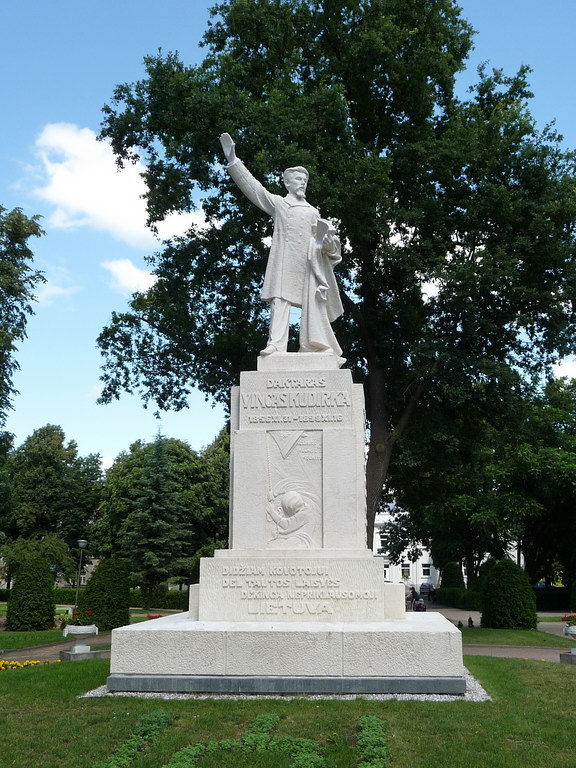
Monument to Vincas Kudirka in Kudirkos Naumiestis
