= Kalvarija, Lithuania =

Kalvarija
- Town
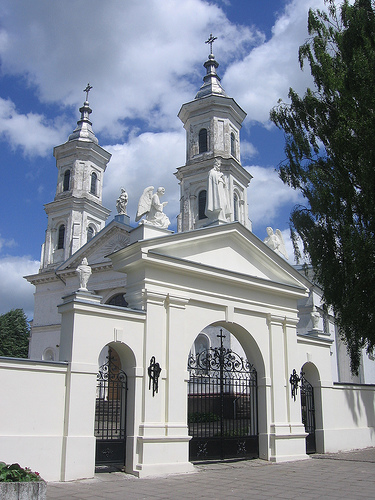
- Church in Kalvarija

- Coat of arms
- Interactive map of Kalvarija
- Location of Kalvarija
- Coordinates: 54°25′0″N 23°13′0″E
- Country: Lithuania
- Ethnographic region: Suvalkija
- County: Marijampolė County
- Municipality: Kalvarija Municipality
- Eldership: Kalvarija eldership
- Capital of: Kalvarija Municipality; Kalvarija eldership
- First mentioned: 1667
- Granted town rights: 1791

Population (2021)
  - Total: 3,971
- Time zone: UTC+2 (EET)
  - Summer (DST): UTC+3 (EEST)

Kalvarija (Polish: Kalwaria) is a town in Marijampolė County in southwestern Lithuania, near the border with Poland. It is the administrative seat and largest town of Kalvarija Municipality.

== Etymology and names ==
Variants of the name include Kalvarijos, Kalvariya, Kalwarja, Yiddish: קאלװאריע (Kalvarye), Kalwaria (Polish), Kalvarien (German), Calvaria, Kalvaria, Kalwariya, and Kalwarya. The town is named so because it was established in the 17th century as a shrine commemorating the crucifixion of Jesus.

== History ==
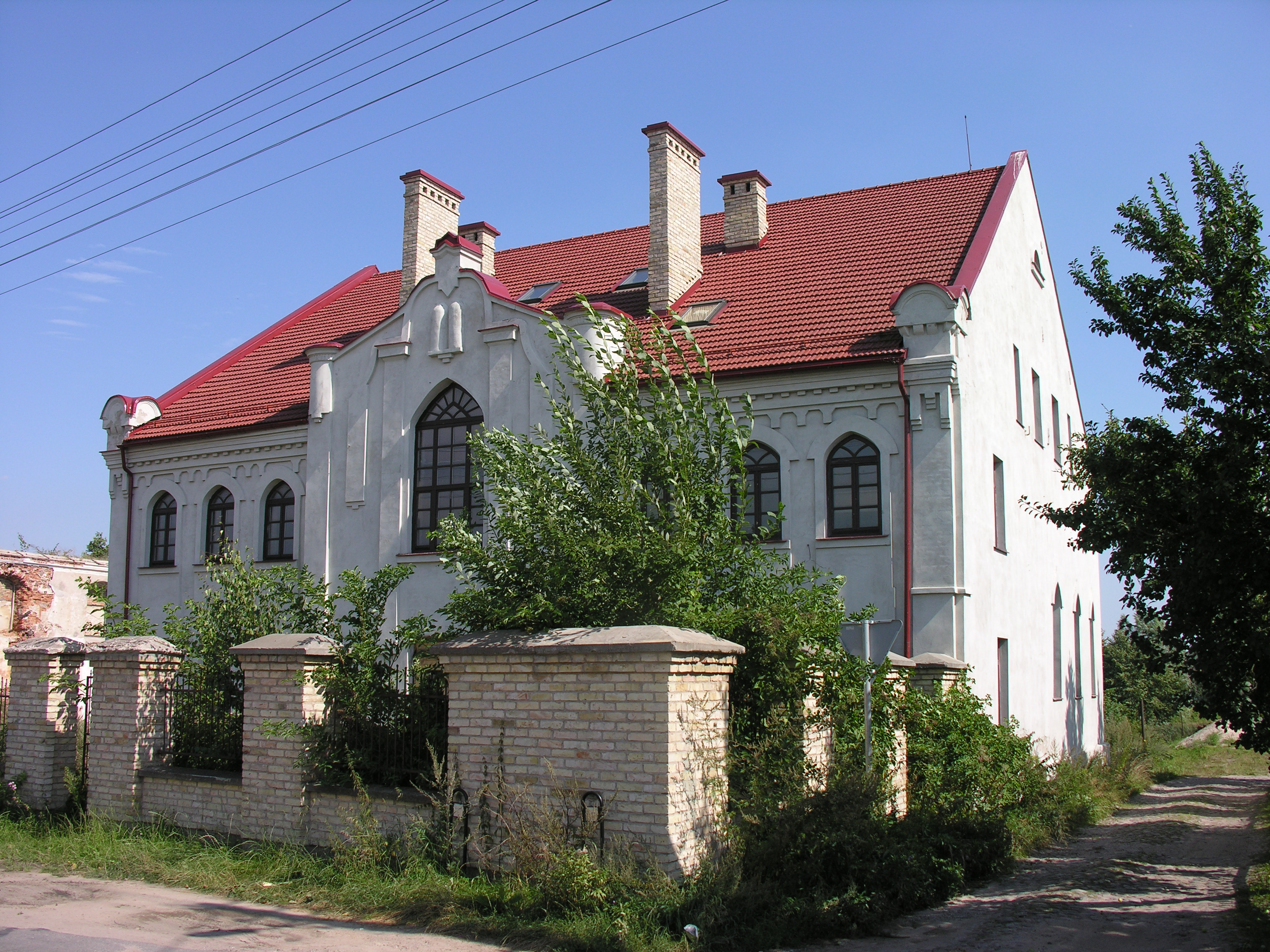
Winter synagogue

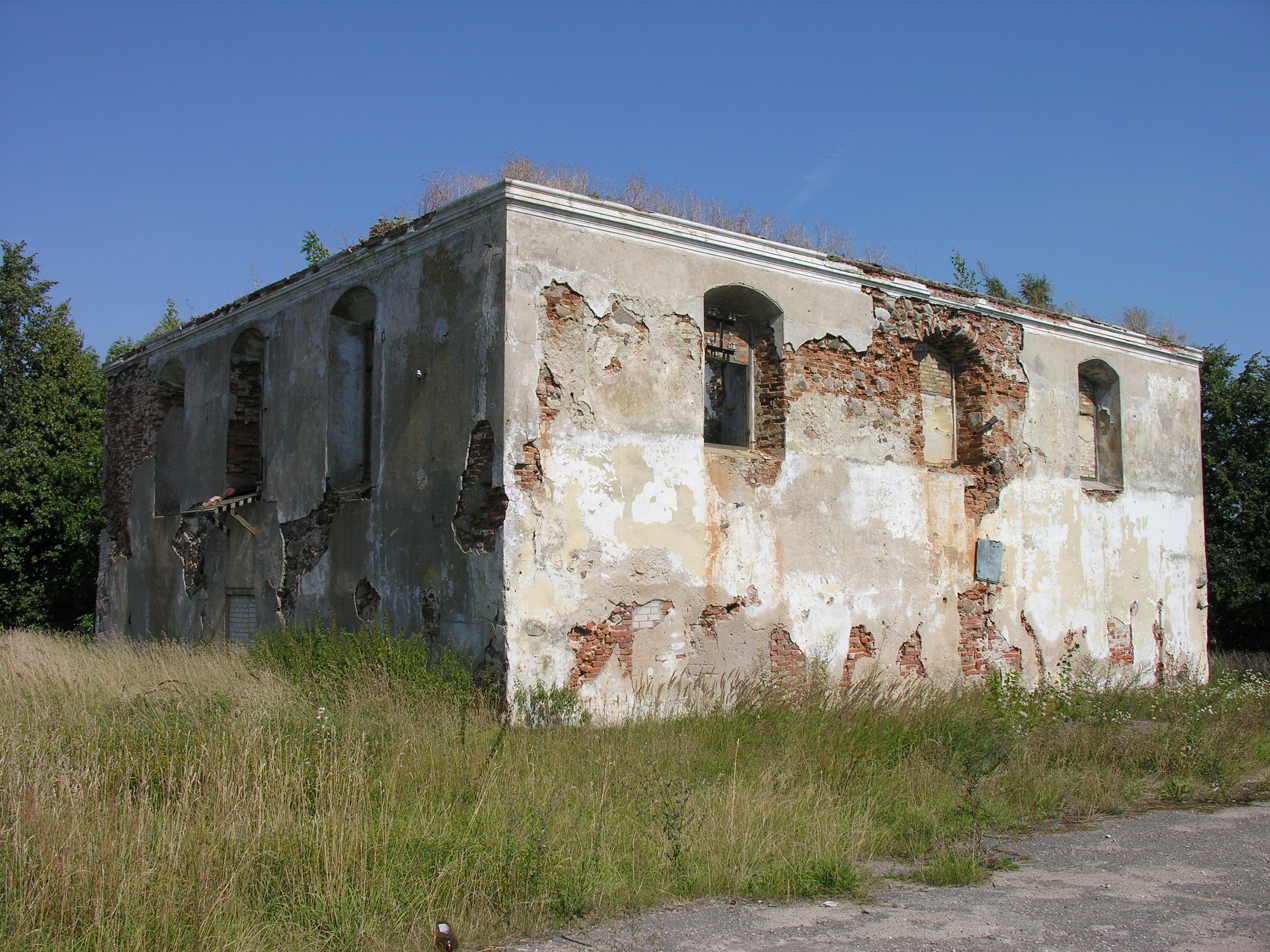
Old synagogue from the 18th century

In 1705, the first wooden church was built. In 1713, local Jews received permission from King August II to build a synagogue and Jewish craftsmen were first permitted to practice their crafts without having to be members of the craft guilds. In 1791, Stanisław August Poniatowski recognized that Kalvarija had the right to call itself a town and confirmed the municipality's coat of arms. 1840 saw the construction of a new Catholic church, which still stands today. Kalvarija developed rapidly when the new St. Petersburg–Warsaw road was constructed toward the end of the 19th century. By the outbreak of World War I, Kalvarija had over 10,000 inhabitants; the destruction of two-thirds of the town during the war caused the population decline. The city was the site of a battle in 1915, during World War I.

After World War I Kalvarija became part of newly independent Republic of Lithuania in 1918.

During World War II, Lithuania and Kalvarija was under Soviet occupation from 15 June 1940 until 22 June 1941, when German occupation begun. German occupation lasted until 1 August 1944, when Soviet re-occupied Lithuania.

During German occupation Kalvarija was part of the Generalbezirk Litauen of Reichskommissariat Ostland. In 1941, a mass execution of 38 Jews of the city was perpetrated by Gestapo soldiers and Lithuanian policemen. Soviet reoccupied Kalvarija and Lithuania during summer 1944. The town suffered greatly during World War II – about 70 percent of the buildings burned down. After re-occupation by the Soviets, there was partisan activity in the area.

The American comedian Seth Meyers' great-grandfather originated from a small village 6 km from Kalvarija, and emigrated to the US around 1869. According to Finding Your Roots with Henry Louis Gates on Youtube, Seth Meyers' ancestors probably came from the Trakenai estate in the village of Brazavas.

== International relations ==
=== Twin towns — Sister cities ===
Kalvarija is twinned with:

- Alpago (formerly Pieve D’Alpago) in Italy
- Kalwaria Zebrzydowska in Poland
- Ráckeve in Hungary

== See also ==
- Suwałki Gap
