= Marijampolė Municipality =

Coordinates: 54°33′36″N 23°21′32″E

Marijampolė Municipality Marijampolės savivaldybė
- Municipality
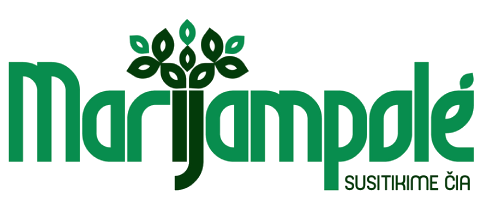
- Flag Coat of arms Brandmark

- Location of Marijampolė municipality within Lithuania

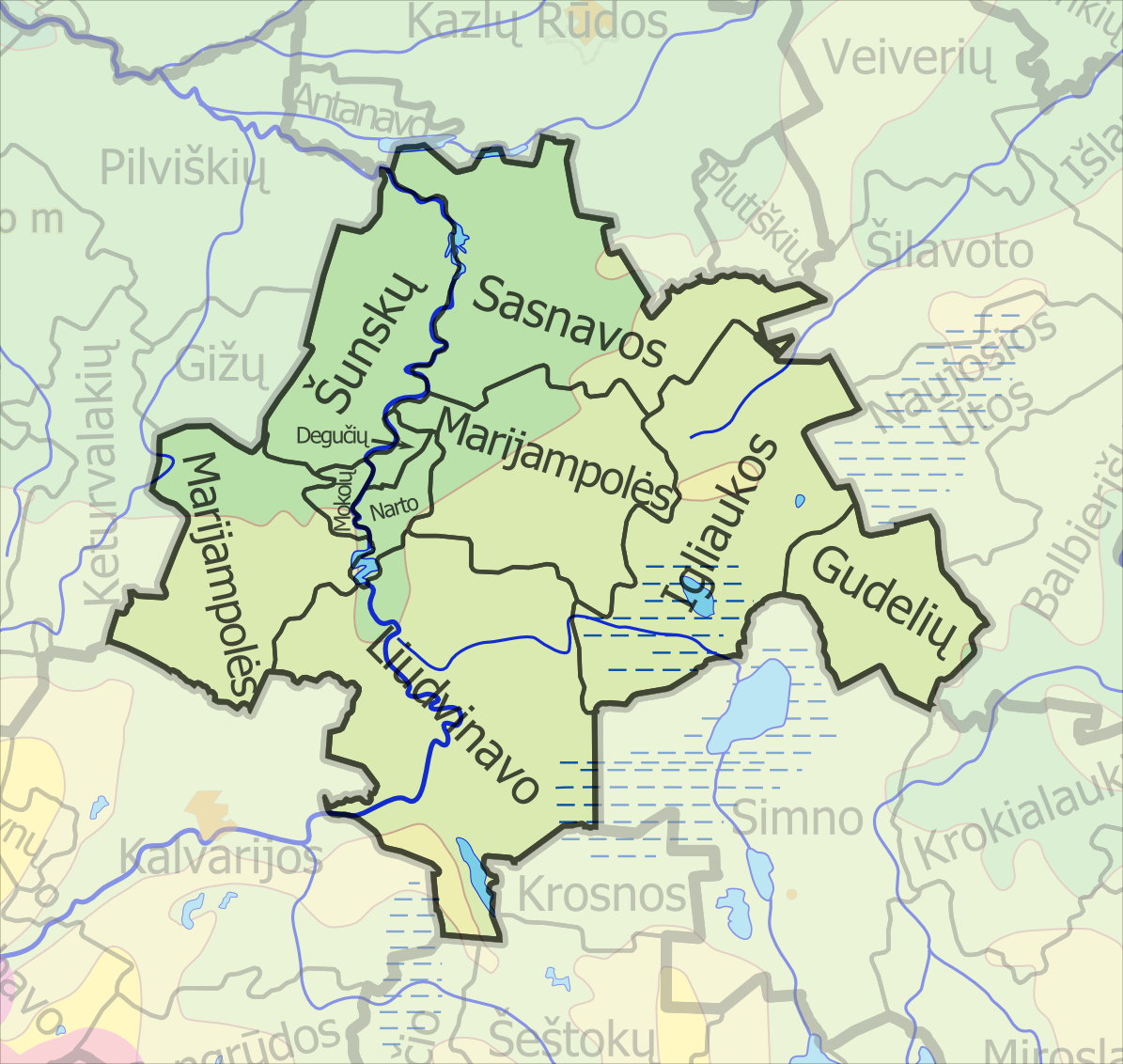
- Map of Elderships in Marijampolė municipality
- Interactive map of Marijampolė Municipality
- Country: Lithuania
- Ethnographic region: Suvalkija
- County: Marijampolė County
- Capital: Marijampolė
- Elderships: 6

Area
  - Total: 755 km^{2} (292 sq mi)
  - Rank: 44th

Population (2021)
  - Total: 54,846
  - Rank: 9th
  - Density: 72.6/km^{2} (188/sq mi)
  - Rank: 9th
- Time zone: UTC+2 (EET)
  - Summer (DST): UTC+3 (EEST)
- Telephone code: 343
- Major settlements: Marijampolė (pop. 36,234)
- Website: www.marijampole.lt

Marijampolė Municipality (Lithuanian: Marijampolės savivaldybė) is a municipality in Marijampolė County, south-western Lithuania. Its administrative seat and largest town is Marijampolė.

It borders Lazdijai District Municipality and Alytus District Municipality to the south-east, Prienai District Municipality to the east, Vilkaviškis District Municipality to the west, Kazlų Rūda Municipality to the north and Kalvarija Municipality to the south.

Marijampolė Municipality was established in 2000 after the territorial administrative reform, which abolished the Marijampolė District Municipality.

Marijampolė has a City Council with 27 members. The members of the City Council represent different Lithuanian political parties.

The town of Marijampolė and its 6 surrounding elderships make up the territory of Marijampolė Municipality. They are: Gudeliai, Igliauka, Liudvinavas, Marijampolė, Sasnava, and Šunskai communities. Marijampolė Municipality covers 755 square kilometres (292 sq mi) of land; 72% of which is an agricultural area, 12.3% is covered by forests; 4.2% – towns and villages, 2% – industrial enterprises and roads, and 6.9% – area used for other purposes.
