= Šakiai =

- City
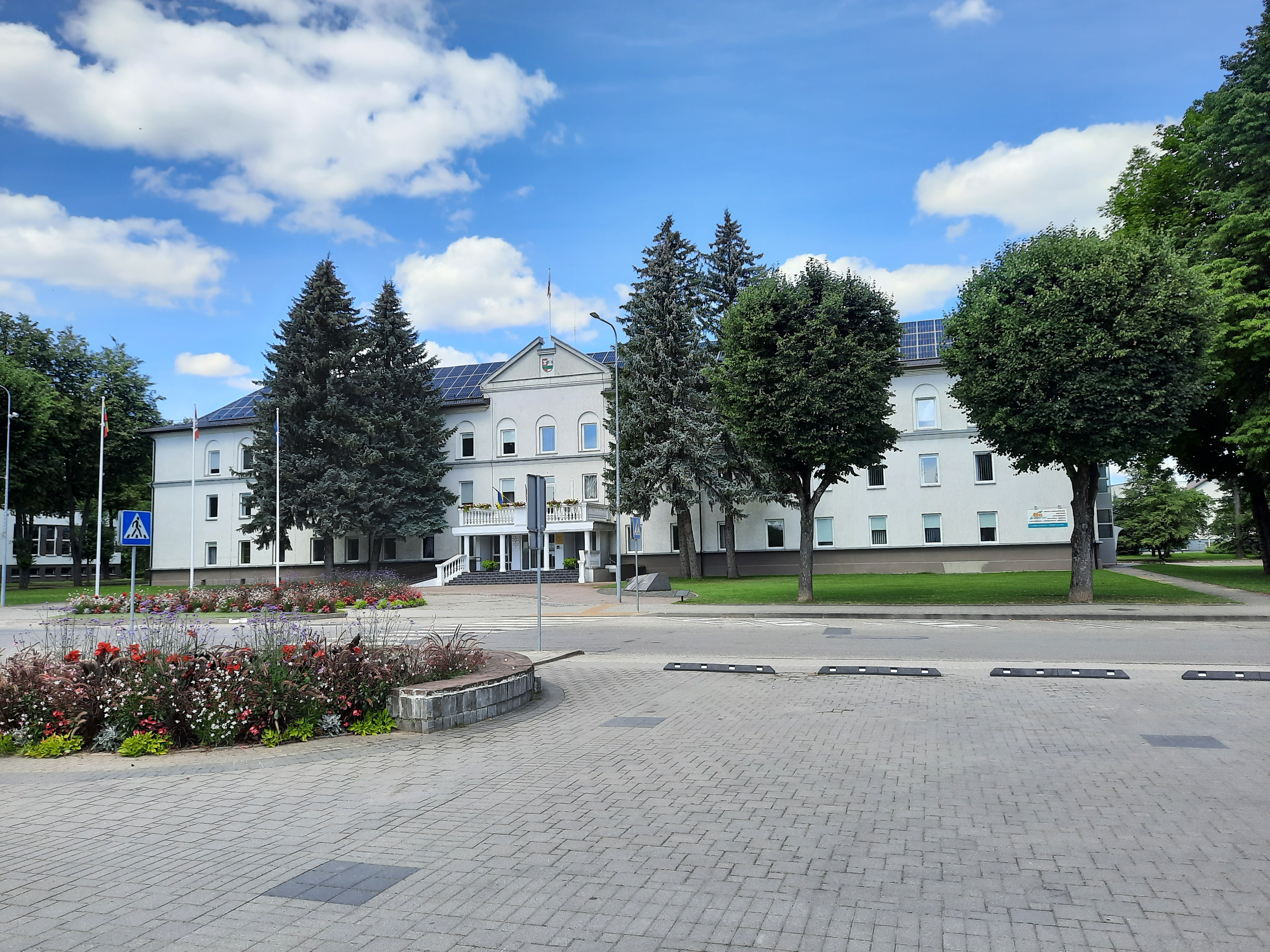
- Šakiai town hall

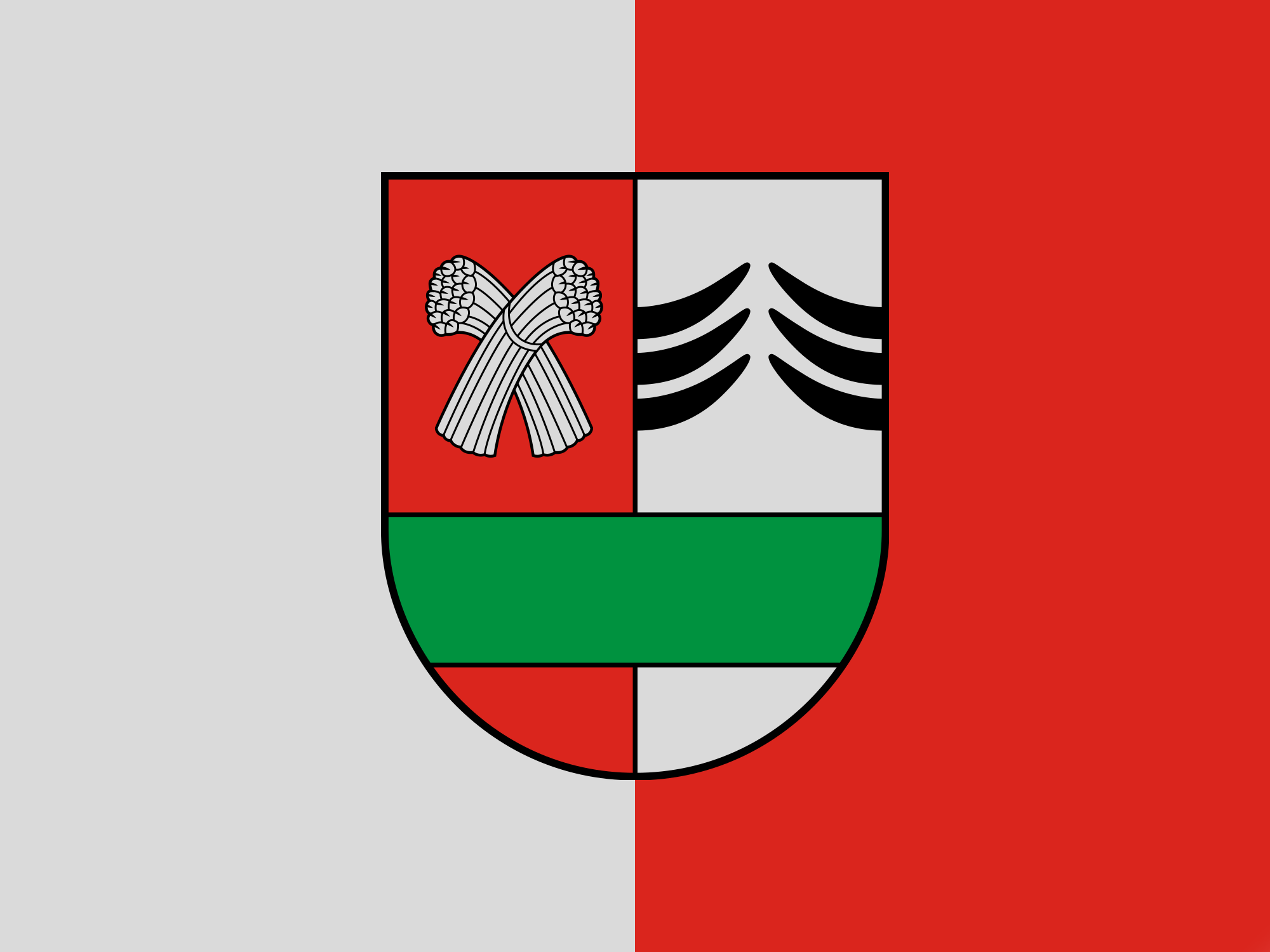
- Flag Coat of arms Brandmark

- Location of Šakiai
- Coordinates: 54°57′N 23°3′E
- Country: Lithuania
- Ethnographic region: Suvalkija
- County: Marijampolė County
- Municipality: Šakiai district municipality
- Eldership: Šakiai eldership
- Capital of: Šakiai district municipality Šakiai eldership
- First mentioned: 1599
- Granted town rights: 1776

Government
  - Mayor: Edgaras Pilypaitis (TS‑LKD)

Population (2021)
  - Total: 5,462
- Time zone: UTC+2 (EET)
  - Summer (DST): UTC+3 (EEST)

Šakiai is a city in the Marijampolė County, Lithuania. It is located 65 km (40 mi) west of Kaunas.

== History ==
It is presumed that Šakiai first expanded from Šakaičai village, which was first mentioned in 1599. In 1719, Šakaičiai was renamed to Šakiai, and in the same year, a church was built. In 1765, Michał Fryderyk Czartoryski approved the settlement of Jews. In 1766, it was granted Magdeburg rights by King Stanisław II August Poniatowski thanks to efforts of Michał Fryderyk Czartoryski.

It was annexed by Prussia in the Third Partition of Poland in 1795. In 1807, it became part of the short-lived Polish Duchy of Warsaw, and after its dissolution in 1815, it passed to Russian-controlled Congress Poland. Local Catholic and Lutheran parishes were established in 1801 and 1842, respectively. A synagogue was first mentioned in 1815. The town was captured by insurgents of the January Uprising in 1863. In 1890–1894, Vincas Kudirka, the author of Tautiška giesmė, lived in Šakiai. After World War I, it was again part of independent Lithuania.

During World War II, the town was under Soviet occupation from 1940, and then under German occupation from 1941 to 1944. The city was damaged by the bombardment of Soviet Air Forces, while the Nazi German Army has exploded many masonry buildings (only 70 homes out of 328 remained). Several massacres of Jewish people are alleged to have taken place in Šakiai in World War II, from July to September 1941. The killings are alleged to have committed by an Einsatzgruppen of German SS troops. The involvement of a small number of Lithuanians is also alleged.

== Demographics ==
As of the 2021 census, the town of Šakiai had a population of 5,462 residents. The town covers an area of 4.254 km^{2}, resulting in a population density of approximately 1,284 people per square kilometer. Over the past decade, Šakiai has experienced a slight decline in population, with an annual decrease of -1.1% from 2011 to 2021, reflecting a broader trend of population decline in Lithuania.

In terms of gender distribution, Šakiai has a slightly higher proportion of females, who make up 54.8% (2,992 individuals) of the population, compared to males, who account for 45.2% (2,470 individuals). This gender imbalance is part of a national trend.

== Gallery ==
Church of John the Baptist

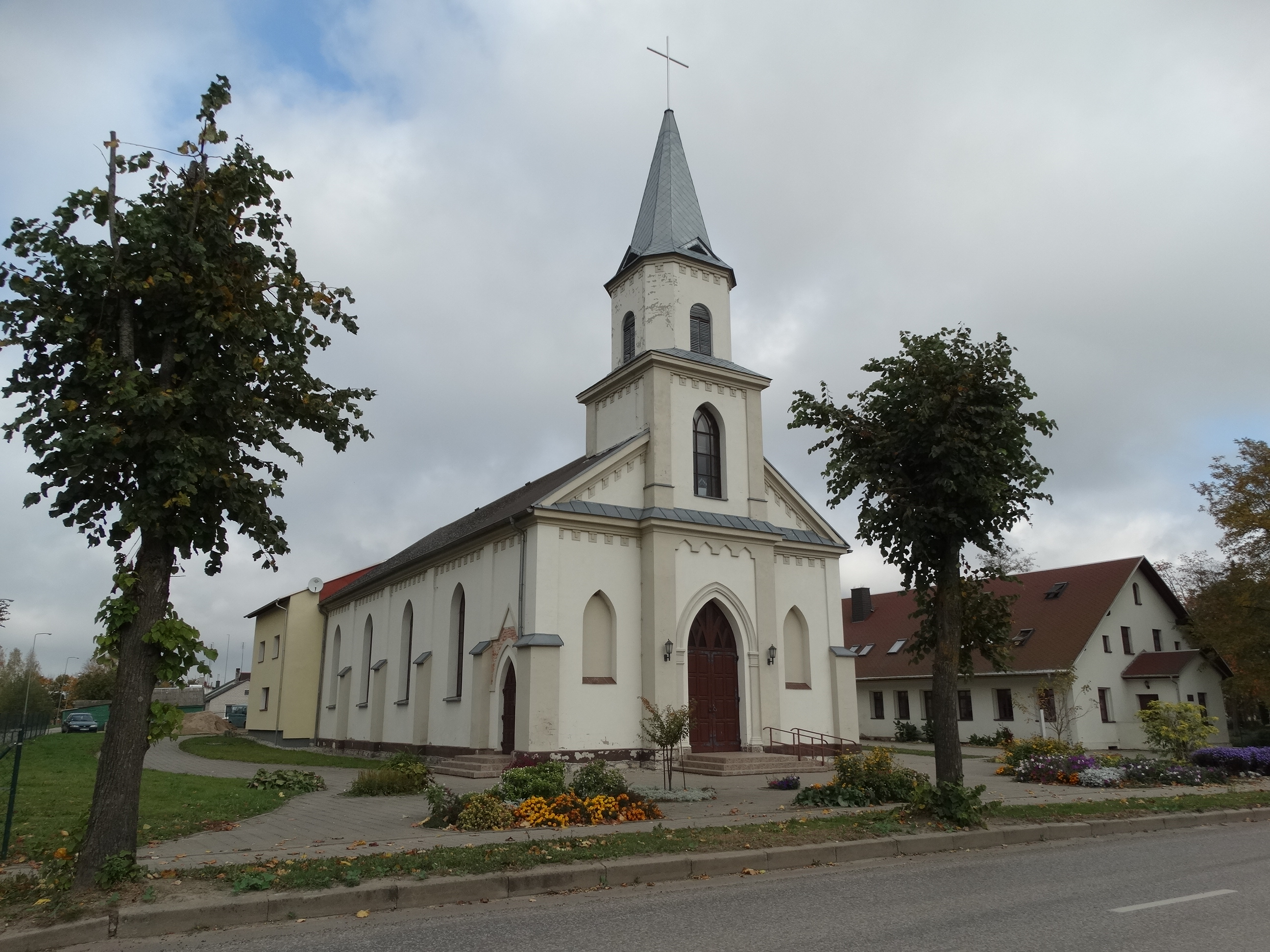
Šakiai Evangelical Lutheran Church

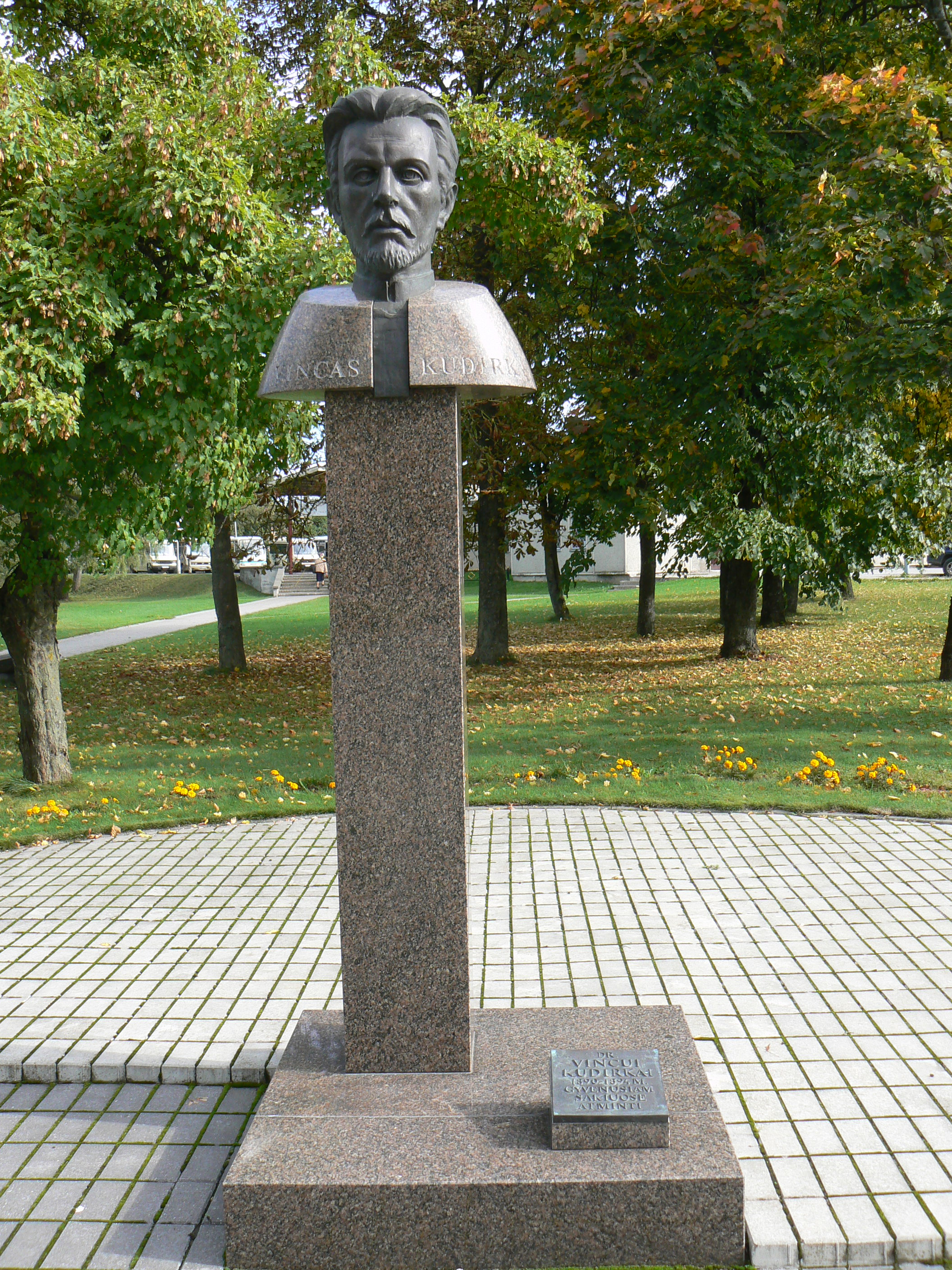
Bust of Vincas Kudirka

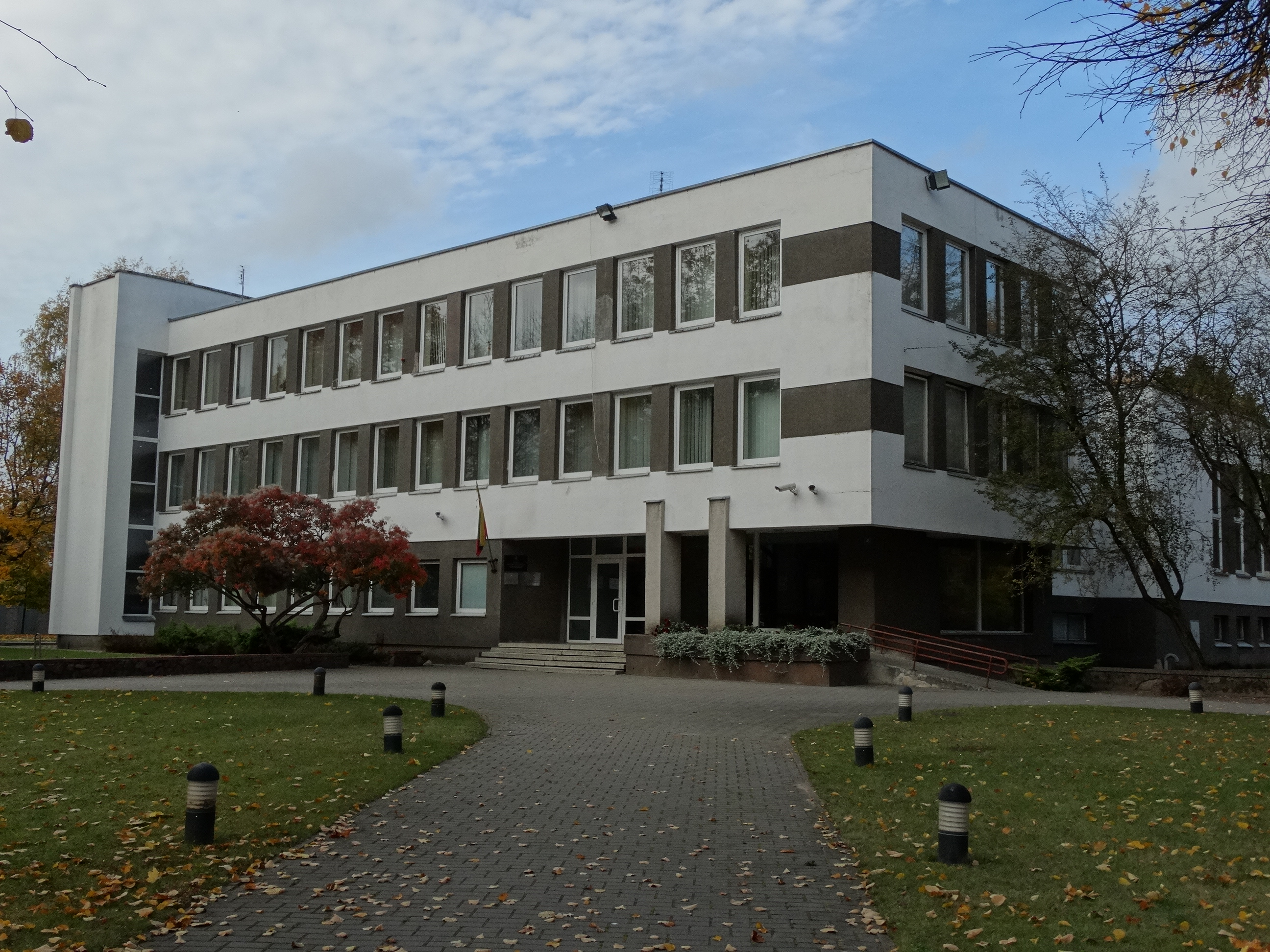
Court

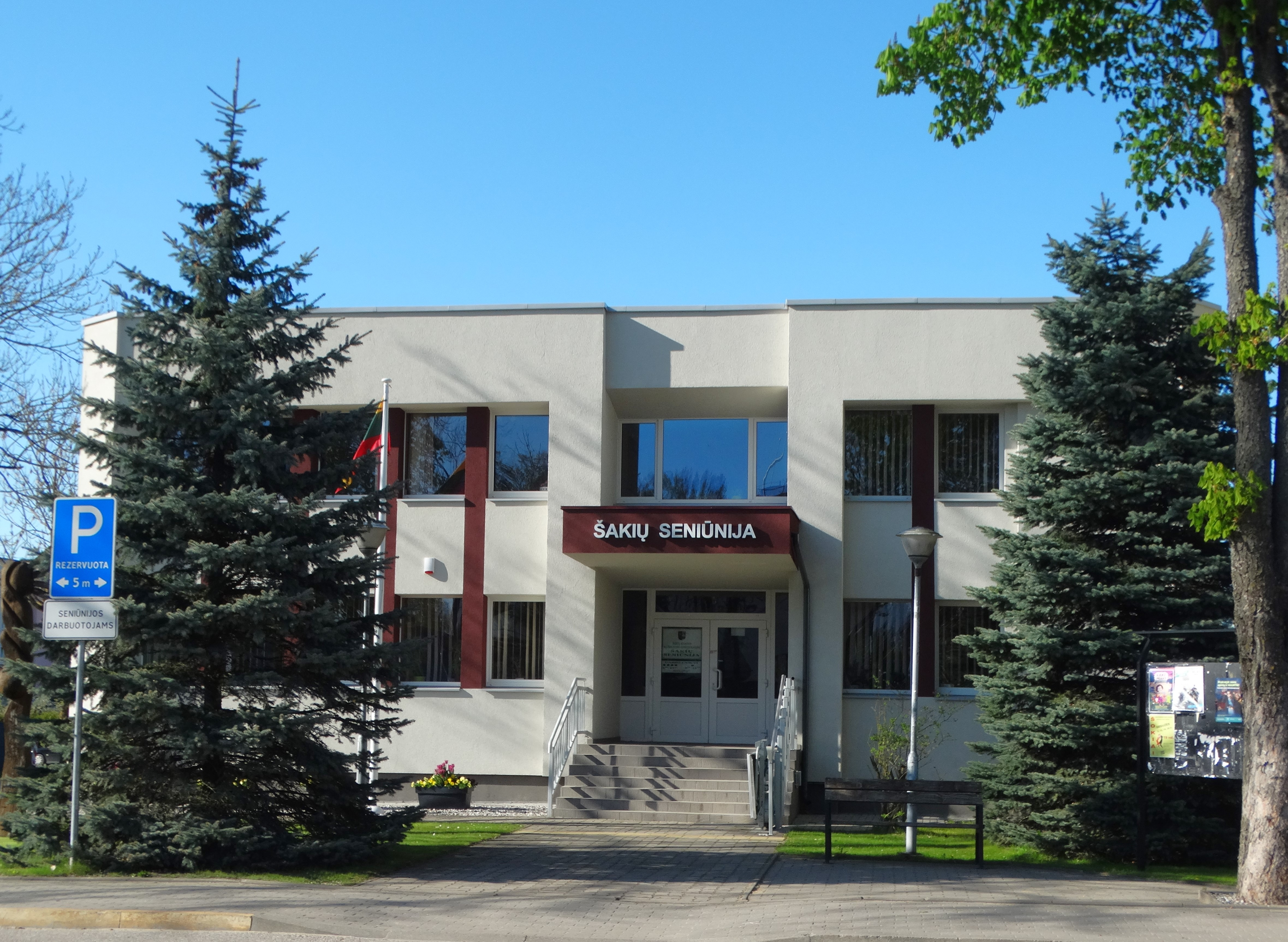
Šakiai Eldership

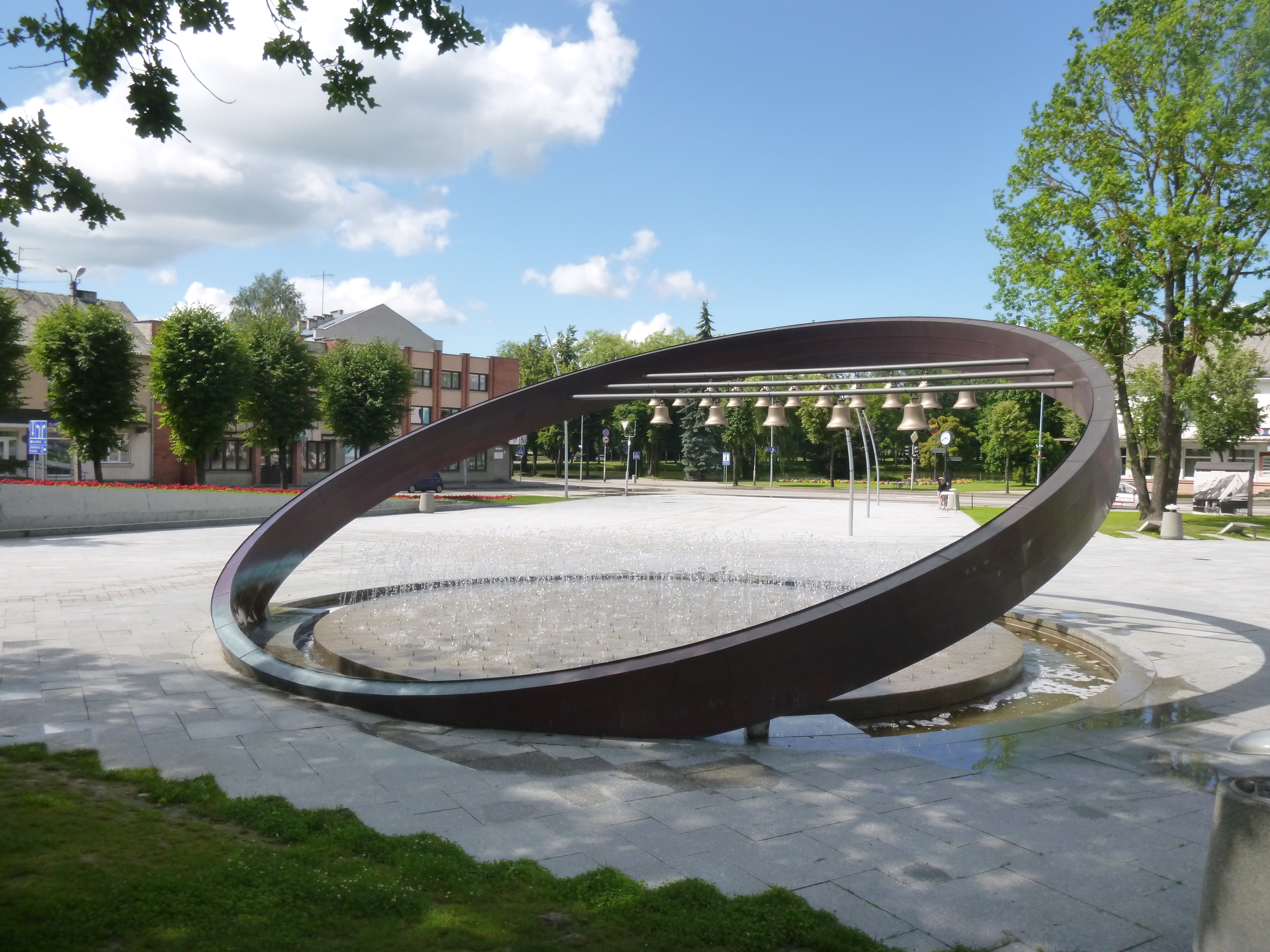
Carillon

== Notable residents ==
- Isaac Leib Goldberg, Zionist philanthropist (1860–1935)
- Zygmunt Kęstowicz (1921–2007), Polish actor
- Gvidonas Markevičius (born 1969), basketball player
- Dainius Adomaitis (born 1974), basketball player and coach

== Twin towns – sister cities ==
Šakiai is twinned with:

- Gołdap, Poland
