= Vilkaviškis Cathedral =

Cathedral of the Visitation
- Švč. M. Marijos Apsilankymo katedra
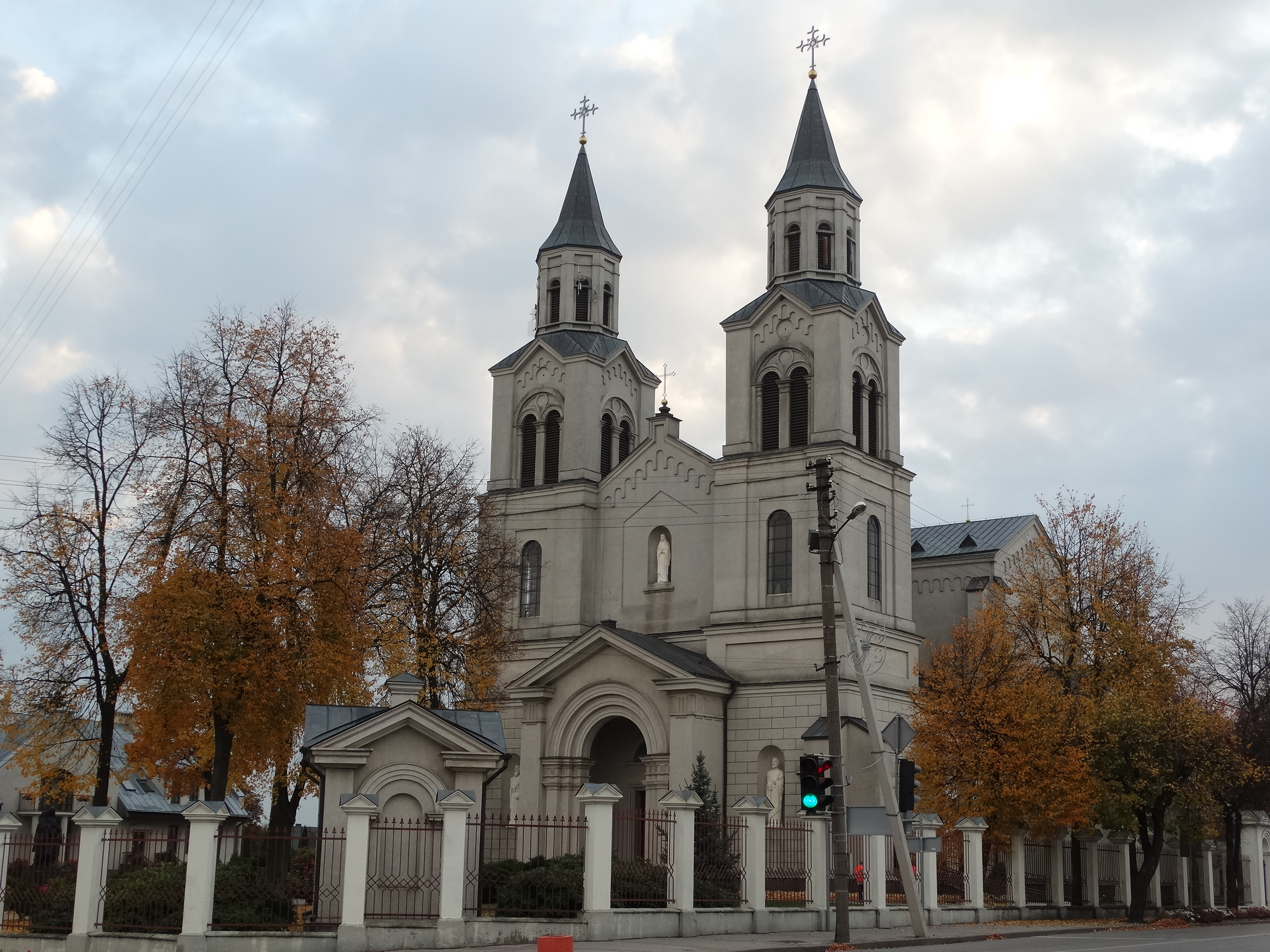
- Cathedral of the Visitation
- 54.6480°N 23.0371°E
- Location: Vilkaviškis
- Country: Lithuania
- Denomination: Roman Catholic Church

History
- Consecrated: 1998

Architecture
- Architectural type: Historicism
- Years built: 1881 (rebuilt 1998)
- Groundbreaking: 1870
- Demolished: 1944

The Cathedral of the Visitation (Lithuanian: Švč. M. Marijos Apsilankymo katedra) also called Vilkaviškis Cathedral is a religious building of the Catholic Church that serves as the cathedral of Vilkaviškis, Lithuania, and is the seat of the Diocese of Vilkaviškis.

The church was built in Romanesque style, between 1870 and 1881 and was consecrated in 1884. With the erection of the Diocese of Vilkaviškis in 1926, the church was elevated to the rank of cathedral. The building suffered no major damage during World War II, however, the Russian authorities authorized their gradual dismantling to use their materials for civil construction. After the fall of communism in the country the cathedral was rebuilt from 1991 and the works were completed in 1998.

== See also ==
- Roman Catholicism in Lithuania
- Cathedral of the Blessed Virgin Mary

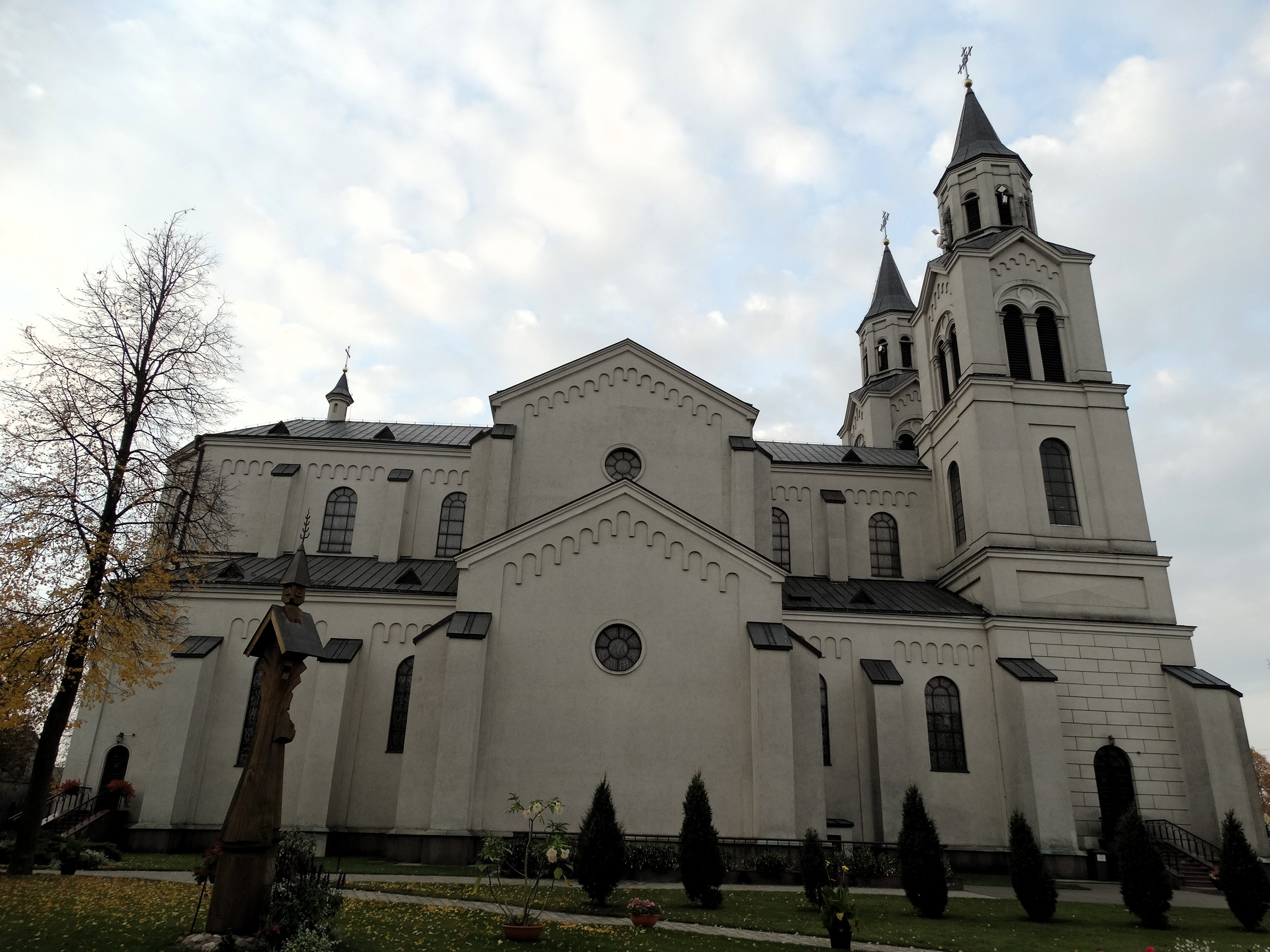
Another view
