= Liubavas Eldership =

Eldership of Lithuania

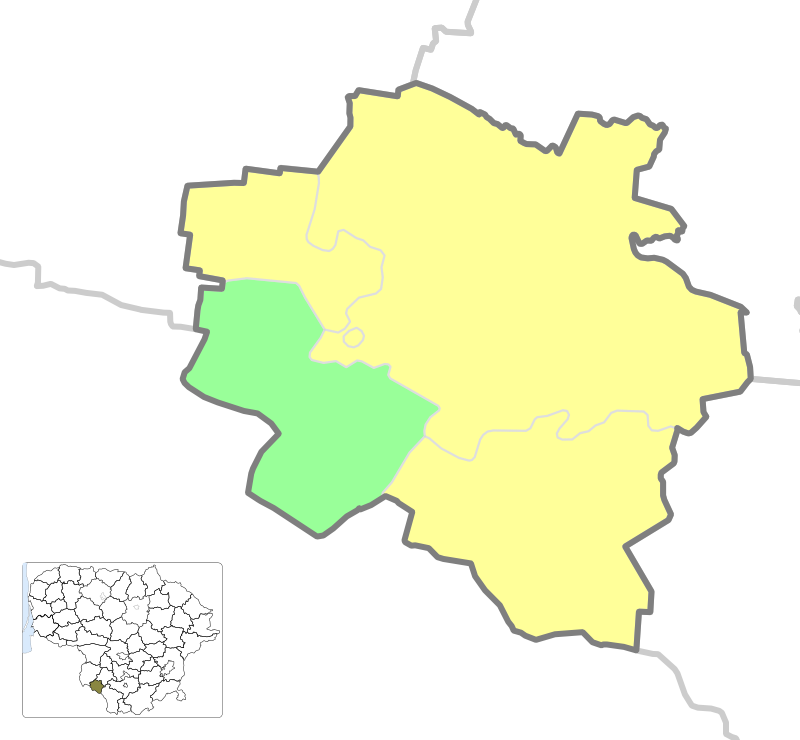
Location of Liubavas Eldership in Kalvarija Municipality

The Liubavas Eldership (Lithuanian: Liubavo seniūnija) is an eldership of Lithuania, located in the Kalvarija Municipality. In 2021 its population was 576.
