= Municipalities of Lithuania =

Second-level administrative division

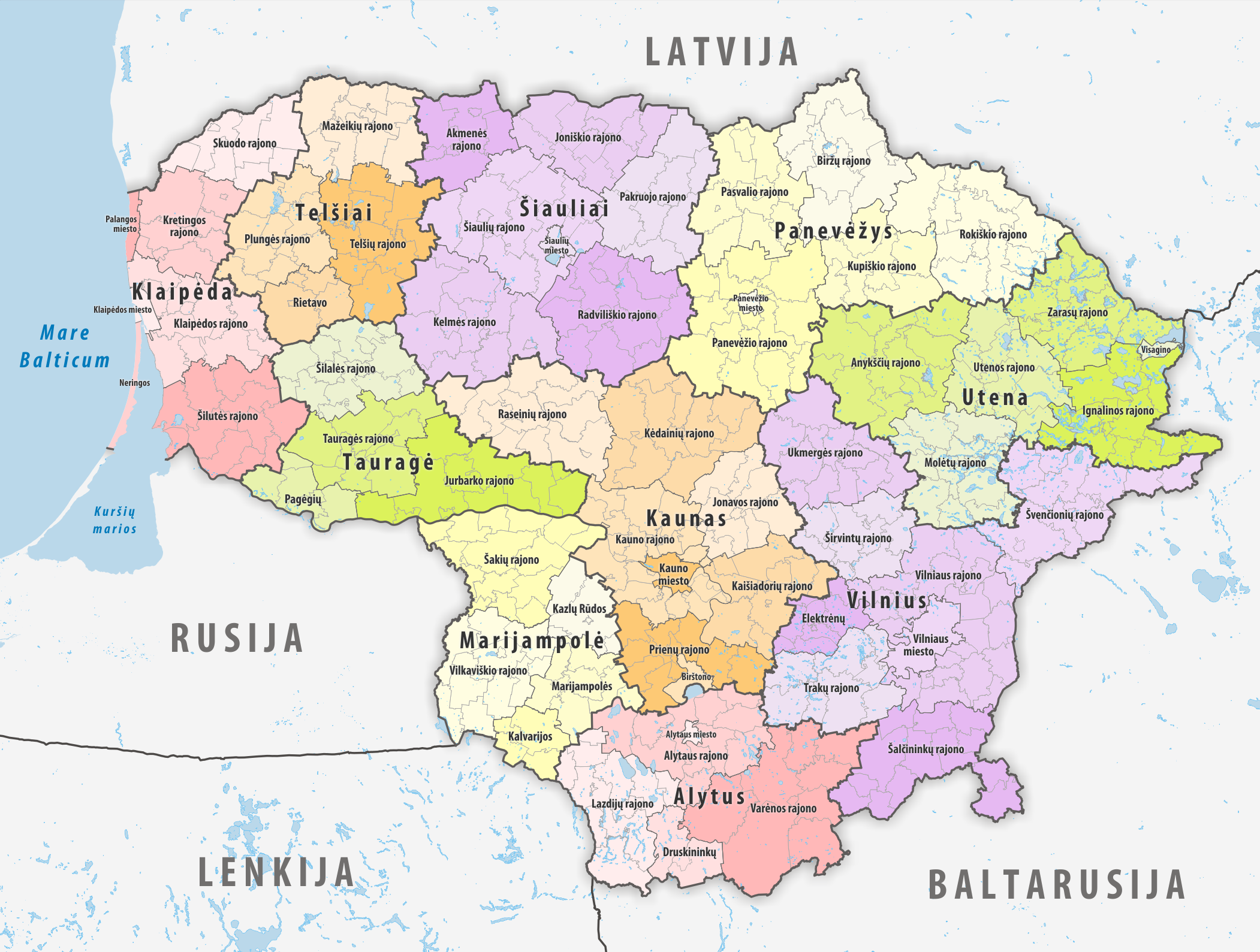
Lithuanian municipalities and elderships map

Location of Lithuania in the European Union

Lithuania is divided into two levels of administrative divisions. The first-level division consists of 60 municipalities (Lithuanian: singular – savivaldybė, plural – savivaldybės), which are further sub-divided into over 500 smaller units, known as elderships (Lithuanian: plural – seniūnijos, singular – seniūnija). For statistical and reporting purposes, municipalities are grouped into 10 counties (Lithuanian: singular – apskritis, plural – apskritys).

At the end of its tenure as a Soviet Socialist Republic, Lithuania's administrative divisions consisted of 44 regions, 12 cities, 80 towns, 19 settlements, and 426 rural districts. The reform of this system was an immediate concern for the new government. The Constitution of Lithuania, ratified in 1992, delegated the power of establishing future administrative units to the Lithuanian Parliament (Seimas). Accordingly, the Seimas passed two fundamental laws: a 1993 law on government representation and a 1994 law specifying the territorial-administrative units and their boundaries. The current system of a set of municipalities under 10 counties was codified by 1995. Several changes were made in 2000, resulting in 60 municipalities.

Ordinary municipal councilors are elected every four years from electoral lists using proportional representation. The mayor, who used to be a member of the council until 2023, is elected directly by the residents using the two-round system since 2015 reforms. Before then, the mayors were elected by the municipal councils.

The largest municipality by population in Lithuania is Vilnius City Municipality with 593,436 residents, home to one fifth (20.7%) of the country's population. The smallest municipality by population is Neringa Municipality with 4,173 (0.1%) residents.

The largest municipality by land area is Varėna District Municipality, which spans 2,216 km^{2} (856 mi^{2}), while the smallest is Alytus City Municipality at 40 km^{2} (15 mi^{2}).

== Powers and functions ==
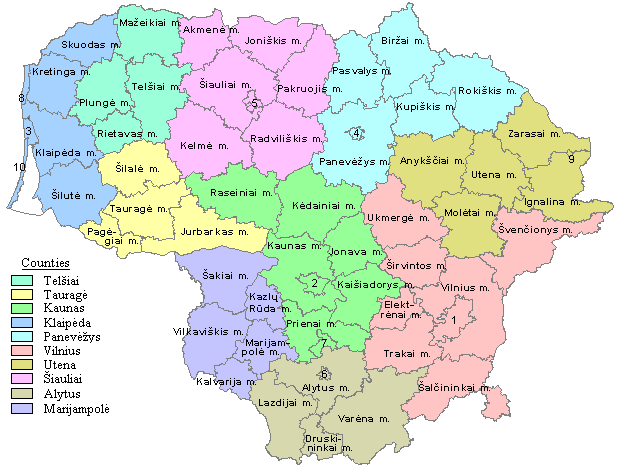
Municipalities are established to perform certain functions provided by law. According to the abovementioned Republic of Lithuania Law on Local Self-Government, the functions of municipalities are "functions related to local government, public administration and provision of public services defined by the Constitution and attributed to municipalities by this and other laws". The processes of integration into international organizations - like the EU and NATO - are considered to be important external factors influencing the development of municipal powers in the country. Lithuania, which has become a member of these organizations, has been assigned completely new responsibilities, some of which, naturally, also belonged to municipalities. In the case of EU integration, municipalities have been assigned the necessary information supply to the European Commission, and in the case of integration into NATO, municipalities have had new functions related to security issues.

1 – Vilnius City Municipality
2 – Kaunas City Municipality
3 – Klaipėda City Municipality

4 – Panevėžys City Municipality
5 – Šiauliai City Municipality
6 – Alytus City Municipality

7 – Birštonas Municipality
8 – Palanga City Municipality
9 – Visaginas Municipality
10 – Neringa Municipality

== Municipalities ==
As of January 1, 2024.

Municipality		Capital	County	Region	Area	Populations	Density
A coat of arms depicting orange tools on a white background on the top and an orange sun on a dark green background on the bottom	Akmenė District Municipality	Naujoji Akmenė	Šiauliai	Žemaitija	844 km^{2} (326 sq mi)	19,126	22.66
A coat of arms depicting orange tools on a white background on the top and an orange sun on a dark green background on the bottom	Alytus City Municipality	Alytus	Alytus	Dzūkija	40 km^{2} (15 sq mi)	51,351	1,284
A coat of arms depicting three flowers that have red petals, green stalks, and green leaves all sprouting from green earth	Alytus District Municipality	Alytus	Alytus	Dzūkija	1,403 km^{2} (542 sq mi)	25,464	18.15
A coat of arms depicting a brown bridge rising up out of a blue body of water into a blue sky with white clouds	Anykščiai District Municipality	Anykščiai	Utena	Aukštaitija	1,764 km^{2} (681 sq mi)	22,372	12.68
A coat of arms depicting a sea creature with sharp teeth, one protruding bottom tooth, and a blowhole spewing water	Birštonas Municipality	Birštonas	Kaunas	Dzūkija	122 km^{2} (47 sq mi)	4,087	33.50
A coat of arms depicting a white flag with a black bird on it with a yellow beak and yellow claws all on a yellow background	Biržai District Municipality	Biržai	Panevėžys	Aukštaitija	1,476 km^{2} (570 sq mi)	22,111	14.98
A coat of arms depicting three golden crowns with five spikes protruding from their tops all on a blue background	Druskininkai Municipality	Druskininkai	Alytus	Dzūkija	453 km^{2} (175 sq mi)	20,103	44.38
A coat of arms depicting three yellow, diagonal lines zig-zagging from the bottom left to the top right on a grey background	Elektrėnai Municipality	Elektrėnai	Vilnius	Dzūkija	509 km^{2} (197 sq mi)	24,745	48.61
A coat of arms depicting three white flowers lined up vertically with four yellow seeds surrounding each all on a blue background	Ignalina District Municipality	Ignalina	Utena	Aukštaitija	1,441 km^{2} (556 sq mi)	13,814	9.59
A coat of arms depicting a white bird with wings outspread, a red beak, and red feet all on a dark blue background	Jonava District Municipality	Jonava	Kaunas	Aukštaitija	943 km^{2} (364 sq mi)	41,489	44.00
A coat of arms depicting an angel in full body armour and wings outspread while standing on a green dragon with a twisted tail	Joniškis District Municipality	Joniškis	Šiauliai	Aukštaitija	1,151 km^{2} (444 sq mi)	20,289	17.63
A coat of arms depicting three grey fleurs-de-lis, two directly across from each other at the top and one on the bottom, all on a red background	Jurbarkas District Municipality	Jurbarkas	Tauragė	Žemaitija	1,506 km^{2} (581 sq mi)	25,443	16.89
A coat of arms depicting four grey horses with red eyes galloping both to the left and to the right all on a black background	Kaišiadorys District Municipality	Kaišiadorys	Kaunas	Aukštaitija	1,087 km^{2} (420 sq mi)	29,062	26.74
A coat of arms depicting a grey castle on a red background on the left and a blue eye in a yellow triangle on the right	Kalvarija Municipality	Kalvarija	Marijampolė	Suvalkija	440 km^{2} (170 sq mi)	9,734	22.12
A coat of arms depicting a white bull with an angry expression and a golden cross protruding from its head all on a red background	Kaunas City Municipality	Kaunas	Kaunas	Aukštaitija	157 km^{2} (61 sq mi)	304,198	1,938
A coat of arms depicting a grey bull's head with a golden cross protruding from the top all on a red crest on a blue background	Kaunas District Municipality	Kaunas	Kaunas	Aukštaitija	1,495 km^{2} (577 sq mi)	106,277	71.09
A coat of arms depicting six yellow stars in a diagonal line running from the bottom left to the top right all on a black background	Kazlų Rūda Municipality	Kazlų Rūda	Marijampolė	Suvalkija	555 km^{2} (214 sq mi)	10,835	19.52
A coat of arms depicting a black wing attached to a black tallon holding a white horseshoe attached to three yellow spurs	Kėdainiai District Municipality	Kėdainiai	Kaunas	Aukštaitija	1,677 km^{2} (647 sq mi)	45,923	27.38
A coat of arms depicting a white wheel on a light blue background at the top and three white leaves on a green background at the bottom	Kelmė District Municipality	Kelmė	Šiauliai	Žemaitija	1,705 km^{2} (658 sq mi)	24,347	14.28
A coat of arms depicting a golden castle with three turrets surrounded with four golden stars all on a red background	Klaipėda City Municipality	Klaipėda	Klaipėda	Prūsija	99 km^{2} (38 sq mi)	159,396	1,610
A coat of arms depicting a sword with a gold hilt and a silver blade penetrating a green wreath all on a red background	Klaipėda District Municipality	Klaipėda	Klaipėda	Prūsija	1,340 km^{2} (520 sq mi)	67,280	50.21
A coat of arms depicting a woman clothed in blue and brown wearing a golden crown and carrying a baby all on a grey background	Kretinga District Municipality	Kretinga	Klaipėda	Žemaitija	989 km^{2} (382 sq mi)	37,433	37.85
A coat of arms depicting a black, six-pointed star on a golden background on the bottom and grey swirls on a blue background on the top	Kupiškis District Municipality	Kupiškis	Panevėžys	Aukštaitija	1,080 km^{2} (420 sq mi)	15,765	14.60
A coat of arms depicting a golden moose with large antlers and a protruding red tongue hovering over three black keys	Lazdijai District Municipality	Lazdijai	Alytus	Dzūkija	1,306 km^{2} (504 sq mi)	17,201	13.17
A coat of arms depicting a man in full body armour riding a brown horse that is trampling a black dragon all on a yellow background	Marijampolė Municipality	Marijampolė	Marijampolė	Suvalkija	755 km^{2} (292 sq mi)	54,590	72.77
A coat of arms depicting a golden arrow with a zig-zag in the middle of it pulled back on a golden bow all on a blue background	Mažeikiai District Municipality	Mažeikiai	Telšiai	Žemaitija	1,219 km^{2} (471 sq mi)	51,909	42.58
A coat of arms depicting a golden key on a red background at the top and three blue birds on a white background at the bottom	Molėtai District Municipality	Molėtai	Utena	Aukštaitija	1,367 km^{2} (528 sq mi)	16,517	11.82
A coat of arms depicting a white "N" on a blue background at the bottom and a series of black and white shapes at the top	Neringa Municipality	Nida	Klaipėda	Prūsija	90 km^{2} (35 sq mi)	4,265	47.39
A coat of arms depicting a grey bird with a golden eye and wings outstretched holding a golden key all on a green background	Pagėgiai Municipality	Pagėgiai	Tauragė	Prūsija	536 km^{2} (207 sq mi)	7,059	13.17
A coat of arms depicting a yellow windmill on a red crest hovering over a black bridge all on a yellow background	Pakruojis District Municipality	Pakruojis	Šiauliai	Aukštaitija	1,315 km^{2} (508 sq mi)	17,870	13.59
A coat of arms depicting a circle for which the boundary is itself made up of beige circles all under a silver crown on a blue background	Palanga City Municipality	Palanga	Klaipėda	Žemaitija	79 km^{2} (31 sq mi)	18,066	228.7
A coat of arms depicting a red castle with black double doors, two black windows, and one central tower all standing on black ground	Panevėžys City Municipality	Panevėžys	Panevėžys	Aukštaitija	50 km^{2} (19 sq mi)	86,599	1,732
A coat of arms depicting two grey sheaves of wheat on a blue background at the top and a red plowshare on a grey background at the bottom	Panevėžys District Municipality	Panevėžys	Panevėžys	Aukštaitija	2,177 km^{2} (841 sq mi)	35,378	16.25
A coat of arms depicting the black head of a bull with a golden vine entangled in its black horns and a golden ring protruding from its nose	Pasvalys District Municipality	Pasvalys	Panevėžys	Aukštaitija	1,289 km^{2} (498 sq mi)	21,930	17.01
A coat of arms depicting the Eye of Providence with a blue iris encapsulated in a golden triangle surrounded in golden rays all on a blue background	Plungė District Municipality	Plungė	Telšiai	Žemaitija	1,105 km^{2} (427 sq mi)	33,042	29.90
A coat of arms depicting a man in full body armour riding a brown horse that is tramplinga green dragon spewing red flames from its mouth	Prienai District Municipality	Prienai	Kaunas	Suvalkija	1,032 km^{2} (398 sq mi)	24,675	23.91
A coat of arms depicting a silver horse that is rearing and neighing all on a dark green background bordered by a thin silver line	Radviliškis District Municipality	Radviliškis	Šiauliai	Aukštaitija	1,634 km^{2} (631 sq mi)	34,302	20.99
A coat of arms depicting a golden lynx with black spots, a red tongue, white teeth, and white claws standing on its back paws on green turf	Raseiniai District Municipality	Raseiniai	Kaunas	Žemaitija	1,573 km^{2} (607 sq mi)	29,769	18.92
A coat of arms depicting a golden lion holding a silver-bladed sword in its mouth with a golden hilt and standing on green turf all on a blue background	Rietavas Municipality	Rietavas	Telšiai	Žemaitija	586 km^{2} (226 sq mi)	7,115	12.14
A coat of arms divided into four sections, the top left and bottom right of which are red, the bottom left of which is blue, and the top right of which is golden	Rokiškis District Municipality	Rokiškis	Panevėžys	Aukštaitija	1,806 km^{2} (697 sq mi)	27,288	15.11
A coat of arms depicting a grey castle with three towers topped by crosses with a human head on the front door all on a blue background	Skuodas District Municipality	Skuodas	Klaipėda	Žemaitija	911 km^{2} (352 sq mi)	15,201	16.69
A coat of arms depicting two grey sheaves of wheat on a red background on the left and six black, curved lines on a grey background on the right	Šakiai District Municipality	Šakiai	Marijampolė	Suvalkija	1,454 km^{2} (561 sq mi)	25,603	17.61
A coat of arms depicting a golden key overlapping a silver key on a blue background at the top and three golden nuts on a red background on the bottom	Šalčininkai District Municipality	Šalčininkai	Vilnius	Dzūkija	1,493 km^{2} (576 sq mi)	29,888	20.02
A coat of arms depicting a black bear with a silver collar on a red background on the left and a blue eye in a grey triangle on the right	Šiauliai City Municipality	Šiauliai	Šiauliai	Žemaitija	81 km^{2} (31 sq mi)	110,461	1,364
A coat of arms depicting an angry, grey bear with yellow claws and a long, red tongue gripping a yellow axe in its paws all on a blue background	Šiauliai District Municipality	Šiauliai	Šiauliai	Žemaitija	1,807 km^{2} (698 sq mi)	40,565	22.45
A coat of arms depicting five red leaves in a straight, horizontal row on a grey background at the top and five grey leaves on a red background at the bottom	Šilalė District Municipality	Šilalė	Tauragė	Žemaitija	1,188 km^{2} (459 sq mi)	20,861	17.56
A coat of arms depicting a grey boat hovering over two partitions of grey water that are themselves hovering over a grey horn all on a green-and-black background	Šilutė District Municipality	Šilutė	Klaipėda	Prūsija	1,714 km^{2} (662 sq mi)	38,331	22.36
A coat of arms depicting a silver-bladed sword with a golden hilt standing erect between the silver antlers of a silver moose head	Širvintos District Municipality	Širvintos	Vilnius	Aukštaitija	906 km^{2} (350 sq mi)	14,668	16.19
A coat of arms depicting a silver fish swimming to the right on the top and another fish swimming to the left on the bottom all on a blue background	Švenčionys District Municipality	Švenčionys	Vilnius	Aukštaitija	1,691 km^{2} (653 sq mi)	21,795	12.89
A coat of arms depicting a rounded, silver horn hung up by a rounded, silver strap all on a solid red background bordered by a black line	Tauragė District Municipality	Tauragė	Tauragė	Žemaitija	1,179 km^{2} (455 sq mi)	37,215	31.56
A coat of arms depicting a bishop in brown robes with a brown mitre on his head surrounded by a golden halo looking at another man	Telšiai District Municipality	Telšiai	Telšiai	Žemaitija	1,439 km^{2} (556 sq mi)	38,852	27.00
A coat of arms depicting a man in full body armour holding a white spear in his right hand and a red-and-yellow shield in his left hand	Trakai District Municipality	Trakai	Vilnius	Dzūkija	1,207 km^{2} (466 sq mi)	34,595	28.66
A coat of arms depicting an open book with a red rose on one page and a red bull on the other all hovering over a red heart with a building in the background	Ukmergė District Municipality	Ukmergė	Vilnius	Aukštaitija	1,395 km^{2} (539 sq mi)	34,023	24.39
A coat of arms depicting a golden horseshoe hovering over a white, 8-point star all on a blue background bordered by a thin, black line	Utena District Municipality	Utena	Utena	Aukštaitija	1,230 km^{2} (470 sq mi)	39,671	32.25
A coat of arms depicting a golden scarab with wings and legs outstretched flying over six purple flowers all on a blue background	Varėna District Municipality	Varėna	Alytus	Dzūkija	2,216 km^{2} (856 sq mi)	20,082	9.06
A coat of arms depicting a large, red fleur-de-lis that has a horizontal symmetry axis all on a blue background bordered by a black line	Vilkaviškis District Municipality	Vilkaviškis	Marijampolė	Suvalkija	1,262 km^{2} (487 sq mi)	33,906	26.87
A coat of arms depicting a white man with a white cape holding a golden staff and giving a ride to a white, golden-haloed child on his shoulder	Vilnius City Municipality	Vilnius	Vilnius	Dzūkija	400 km^{2} (150 sq mi)	602,430	1,506
A coat of arms depicting a man in full body armour riding a black horse and carrying a white spear with a golden blade in his right hand	Vilnius District Municipality	Vilnius	Vilnius	Dzūkija	2,129 km^{2} (822 sq mi)	106,197	49.88
A coat of arms depicting a grey bird with a long, twisting neck, a yellow, pointy beak, and long yellow legs all on a dark blue background	Visaginas Municipality	Visaginas	Utena	Aukštaitija	58 km^{2} (22 sq mi)	19,584	337.7
A coat of arms depicting a grey animal with the body of a fish and the head of a deer on a blue background at the top and a sword on the bottom	Zarasai District Municipality	Zarasai	Utena	Aukštaitija	1,331 km^{2} (514 sq mi)	14,368	10.79

== See also ==
- ISO 3166-2:LT
- Administrative divisions of Lithuania
- Counties (Lithuanian: singular – apskritis, plural – apskritys)
- Elderships (Lithuanian: plural – seniūnijos, singular – seniūnija).
- Seniūnaitija (sub-eldership)
- Cities (Lithuanian: plural – miestai, singular – miestas)
- Towns (Lithuanian: plural – miesteliai, singular – miestelis)

== Notes and references ==
Notes

== Sources ==
- "Law on the Territorial Administrative Units and Their Boundaries". Lietuvos Respublikos Seimas. 30 March 2010.
