= Kalvarija Municipality =

Kalvarija Municipality Kalvarijos savivaldybė
- District Municipality
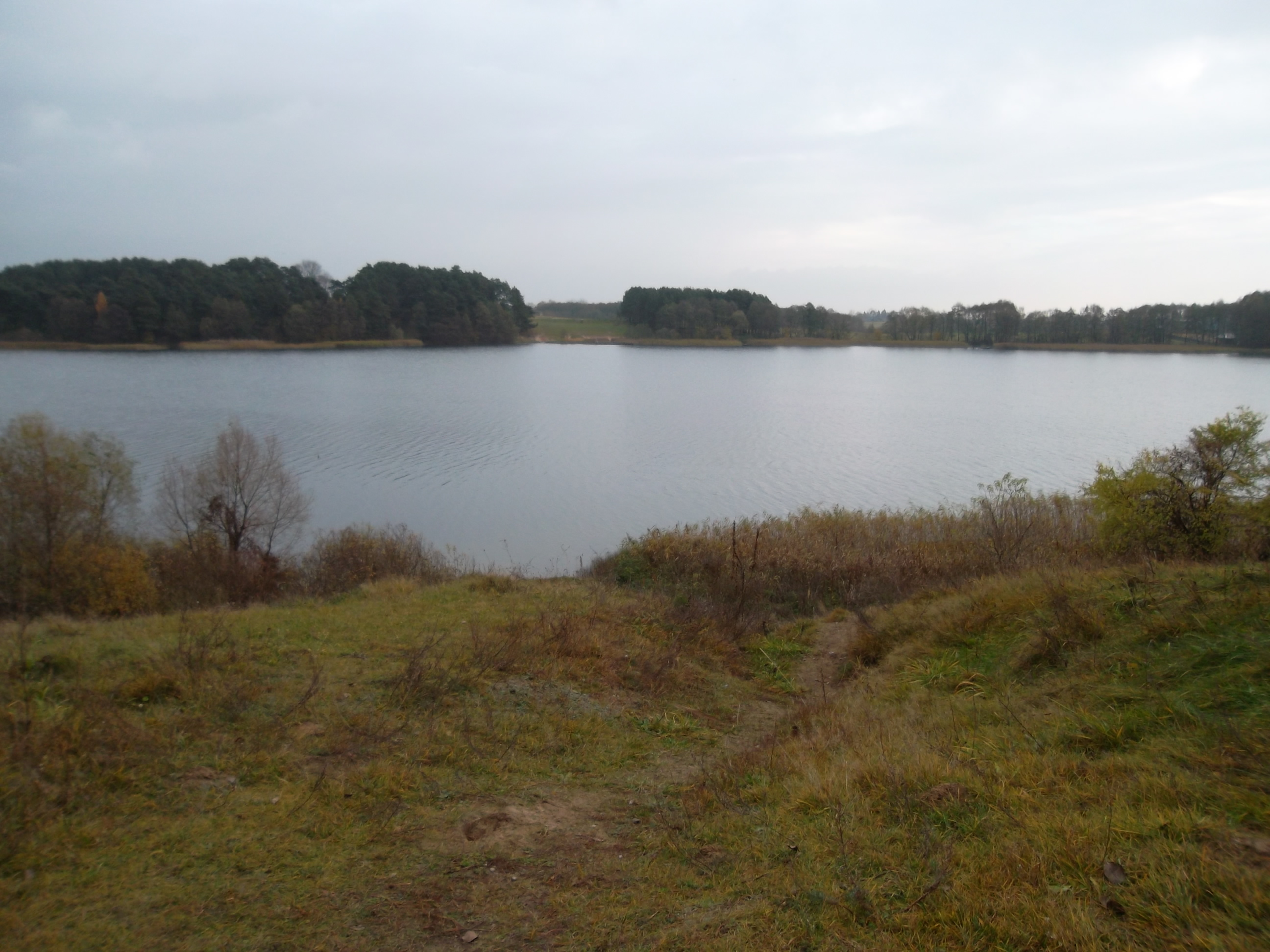
- Lake Orija

- Coat of arms

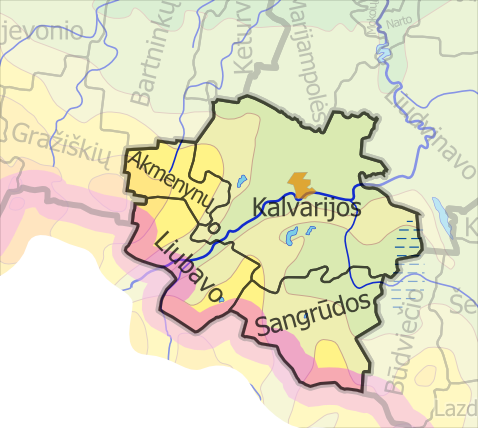
- Map of Kalvarija Municipality

- Location of Kalvarija Municipality within Lithuania
- Coordinates: 54°24′52″N 23°13′39″E
- Country: Lithuania
- Region: Suvalkija
- County: Marijampolė County
- Established: 1999 (27 years ago)
- Capital: Kalvarija
- Elderships: 4

Government
  - Type: City Council
  - Body: Kalvarija Council
  - Mayor: Nerijus Šidlauskas (PAC)
  - Leading: Union of Democrats 5 / 21

Area
  - Total: 440 km^{2} (170 sq mi)
  - Rank: 50th
- Elevation: 246 m (807 ft)

Population (2022)
  - Total: 9,927
  - Rank: 56th
  - Density: 22.56/km^{2} (58.4/sq mi)
  - Rank: 31st
- Time zone: UTC+2 (EET)
  - Summer (DST): UTC+3 (EEST)
- ZIP Codes: 69025–69332
- Phone code: +370 (343)
- Website: www.kalvarija.lt

Kalvarija Municipality (Lithuanian: Kalvarijos savivaldybė) is a municipality in Marijampolė County, south-western Lithuania, on the border with Poland. Its administrative seat and largest town is Kalvarija.

It borders Lazdijai District Municipality to the east, Vilkaviškis District Municipality to the northwest, Marijampolė Municipality to the north and the Polish voivodeship of Podlaskie to the south.

== Elderships ==
Kalvarija Municipality is divided into 4 elderships:

| Eldership (Administrative Center) | Area | Population (2021) |
|---|---|---|
| Akmenynai (Akmenynai) | 46.5 km^{2} (11,490.40 acres; 17.95 sq mi) | 545 |
| Kalvarija (Kalvarija) | 216.11 km^{2} (53,401.94 acres; 83.44 sq mi) | 7,781 |
| Liubavas (Liubavas) | 58.6 km^{2} (14,480.38 acres; 22.63 sq mi) | 576 |
| Sangrūda (Sangrūda) | 99 km^{2} (24,463.43 acres; 38.22 sq mi) | 1,191 |
