= Marijampolė =

City in Suvalkija Region, Lithuania

- City
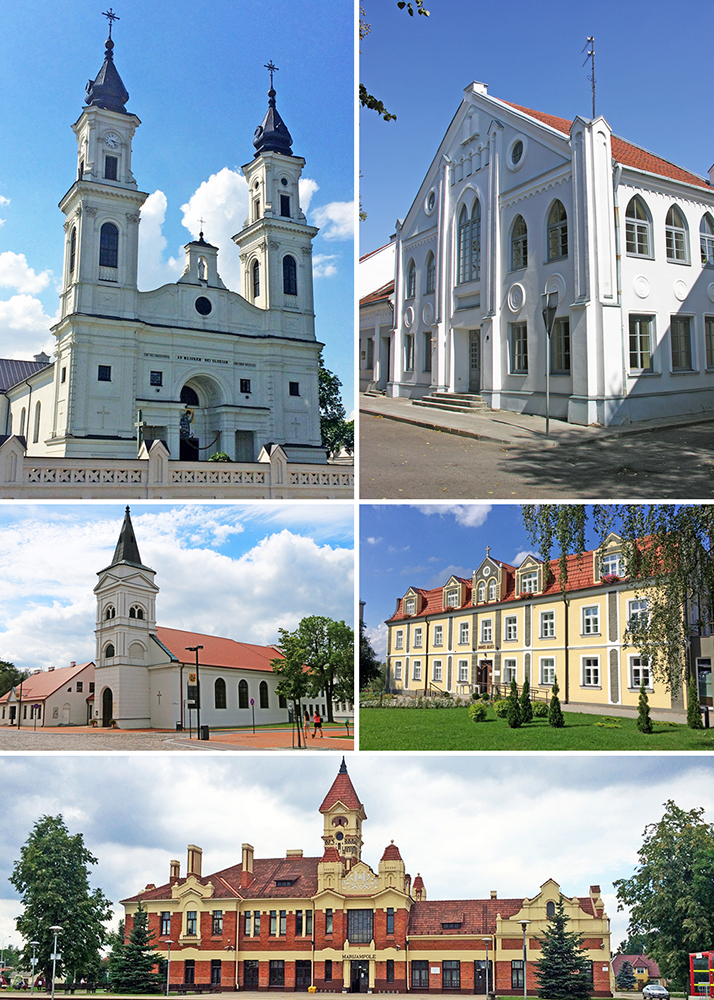
- Landmarks of Marijampolė

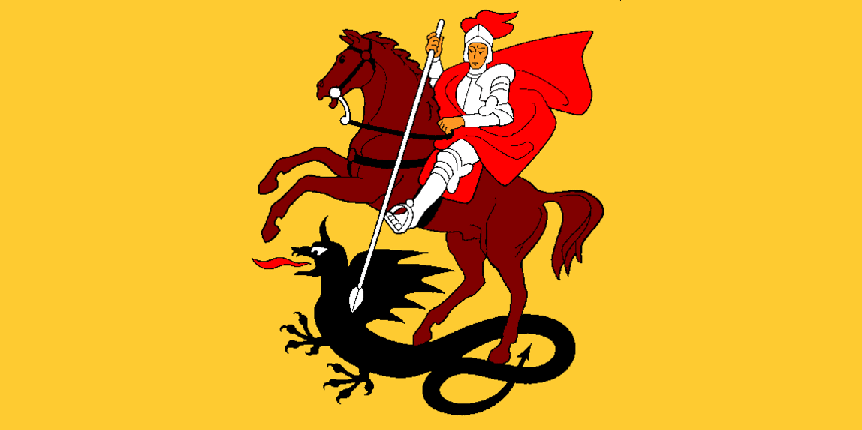
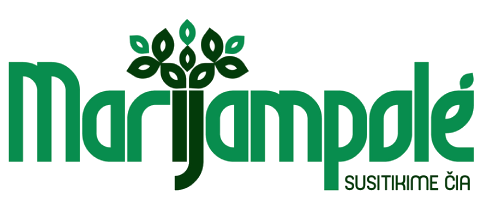
- Flag Coat of arms Brandmark
- Nickname: Miami of Lithuania (unofficial)
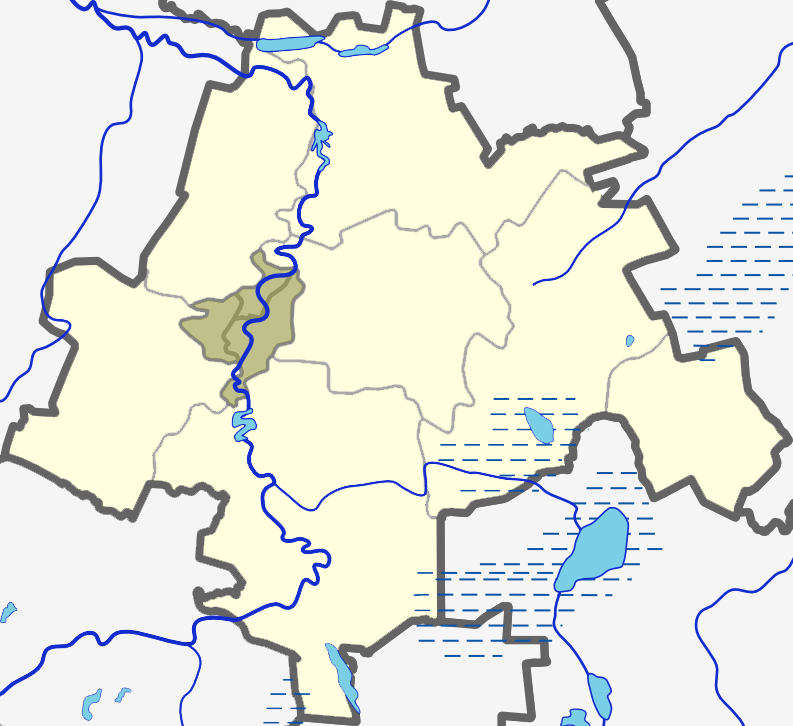
- Location of Marijampolė
- Interactive map of Marijampolė
- Location within Lithuania Location within Europe
- Coordinates: 54°32′50″N 23°21′00″E
- Country: Lithuania
- Ethnographic region: Suvalkija
- County: Marijampolė County
- Municipality: Marijampolė municipality
- Eldership: Marijampolė eldership
- Capital of: Marijampolė County; Marijampolė municipality Marijampolė eldership
- First mentioned: 1337
- Granted city rights: 1420

Government
  - Type: Mayor-Council
  - Mayor: Povilas Isoda (LSDP)
  - Vice Mayor: Artūras Visockis (LSDP)
  - City Council: Council members: Vaida Giraitytė (DP); Snaiguolė Raguckienė (DP); Sigitas Valančius (LSDP); Povilas Isoda (LSDP); Juozas Isoda (LSDP); Romualdas Makauskas (LSDP); Kostas Kynas (LSDP); Karolis Podolskis (LSDP); Jonas Grabauskas (LSDP); Kęstutis Kubertavičius (LSDP); Valdas Pileckas (TS-LKD); Kęstutis Traškevičius (TS-LKD); Petras Pavilonis (TS-LKD); Kostas Jankauskas (TS-LKD); Vanda Juknevičienė (TS-LKD); Gražina Ligija Trimakaitė (TS-LKD); Gediminas Akelaitis (LSDU); Ričardas Mockus (LSDU); Rolandas Jonikaitis (TT); Vytautas Narušis (TT); Janina Senkienė (TT); Alvydas Kirkliauskas (KP); Algis Žvaliauskas (KP); Artūras Venslauskas (LRLS); Benjaminas Mašalaitis (LRLS)

Area
  - City: 24.1 km^{2} (9.3 sq mi)
- Elevation: 86 m (282 ft)

Population (2022)
  - City: 36,234
  - Density: 1,500/km^{2} (3,890/sq mi)
  - Metro: 54,846
- Demonym(s): Marijampolian(s) (English) marijampoliečiai (Lithuanian)
- Time zone: UTC+2 (EET)
  - Summer (DST): UTC+3 (EEST)
- Postal code: 68001
- Area code: (+370) 343
- Website: www.marijampole.lt

Marijampolė (Lithuanian: [mɐrʲɪˈjɐmpoːlʲeː]; previously known by several other names) is the capital of Marijampolė County in the south of Lithuania, bordering Poland and Russian Kaliningrad Oblast, and Lake Vištytis. The city's population stood at approximately 48,700 in 2003. Marijampolė is the seventh-largest city in Lithuania and the sixteenth-largest city in the Baltic States. It is the cultural centre and largest settlement of the historical region of Suvalkija (Sudovia).

Marijampolė has been a regional center since 1994. The city covers an area equal to 205.07 square kilometres (79.18 sq mi). The Šešupė River divides the city into two parts, which are connected by six bridges.

The city is known for the international art and architecture symposium Malonny, an event which focuses on street art, murals, and public installations, transforming Marijampolė's urban spaces into an open-air art gallery.

== Etymology ==
The earliest recorded name of the present-day city of Marijampolė was Stara Būda, this name is attested from 1706. In the first half of the 18th century, it was renamed Starapolė. This place name derives from common nouns (stara “old” + pole “field”) and appears in sources from 1736 as Starepol.

The arrival of the Marian Fathers in 1751 accelerated the town's growth, and the settlement was named Marijanpolė in their honour. In Lithuanian phonology, "n" regularly becomes "m" before "p", thus evolving into Marijampolė. The suffix -polė cannot be interpreted with absolute certainty: it may derive from Greek polis (“city, fortress”), since forming place names based on Ancient Greece was considered elegant in the Polish-Lithuanian Commonwealth at the time (especially for manors and estates). Conversely, in Slavic languages pole means “field.” The former explanation is considered more likely because Marijampolė functions as a eponymous place name, while the Slavic suffix -pole is more typical of toponyms derived from common nouns, although the earlier name Starapolė was indeed formed from common nouns.

On 9 April 1955, by decree of the Soviet authorities, Marijampolė was renamed Kapsukas in honour of the Lithuanian communist activist Vincas Mickevičius-Kapsukas. On 21 March 1989, by decree of the Presidium of the Supreme Council of the Lithuanian SSR and according to the results of a referendum, the city’s historical name Marijampolė was restored.

The city has also been known as: מאַריאַמפּאָל (Yiddish); Mariampol.

== History ==
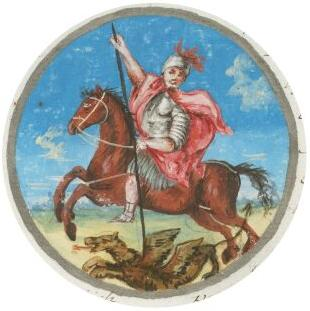
Coat of Arms of Marijampolė city in 1792

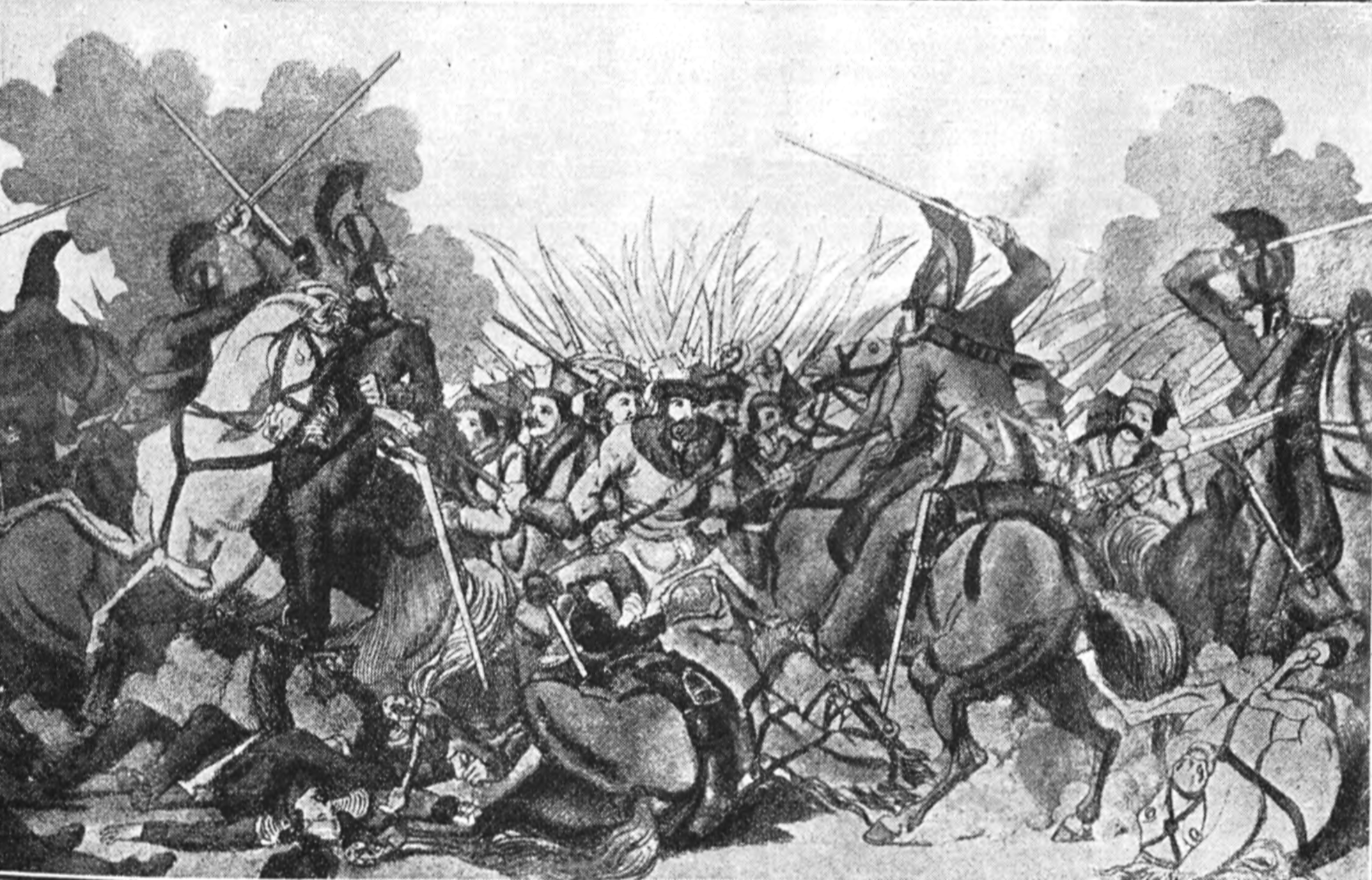
Battle of Marijampolė during the November Uprising in 1831

Marijampolė's origins lie in the village of Stara Būda, which was located in the central area of the present-day city. A survey conducted on 15th March 1710 indicated that the village contained 21 homesteads, which collectively occupied an area of two morgens of land. However, from May of that same year, the inventory was no longer recorded, which corresponded with the outbreak of the Great Northern War plague. By the end of the plague in 1712, the village of Stara Būda had been entirely depopulated. In 1738, Stara Būda experienced a resurgence in population, yet its residents were economically disadvantaged and therefore exempt from taxation.

In the 18th century, the village, at that time belonging to the Catholic Church, grew to become a market town and its name was known Starpol or Staropolė, after a new village built for Prienai starost's guards in the vicinity in 1739. The settlement was destroyed by a fire in 1765.

After the disaster, Pranciška Butlerienė (née Ščiuka), the wife of the starosta of Prienai, financed a new church and a monastery for the Congregation of Marian Fathers. Following the foundation of the monastery, a new town was built in the area, that ws known as Marijanpolė.

On 23 February 1792, King of Poland and Grand Duke of Lithuania Stanisław II Augustus granted the "townlet of Mariampol" with Magdeburg Law and a privilege of organising markets. Following the Partitions of the Polish-Lithuanian Commonwealth, the town was briefly part of Prussia. However, after the Napoleonic Wars, it was transferred to Congress Poland within the Russian Empire. In the 19th century, the town continued to grow, mostly thanks to a large number of Jewish and German settlers. In 1817, the town became the seat of a separate powiat within the administrative system of the kingdom. In 1827, the town had 1759 inhabitants. By 1861, the number had grown to 3718, of which 3015 were Jewish. A fire consumed many wooden homes in 1868. As a result, many houses were rebuilt of stone.

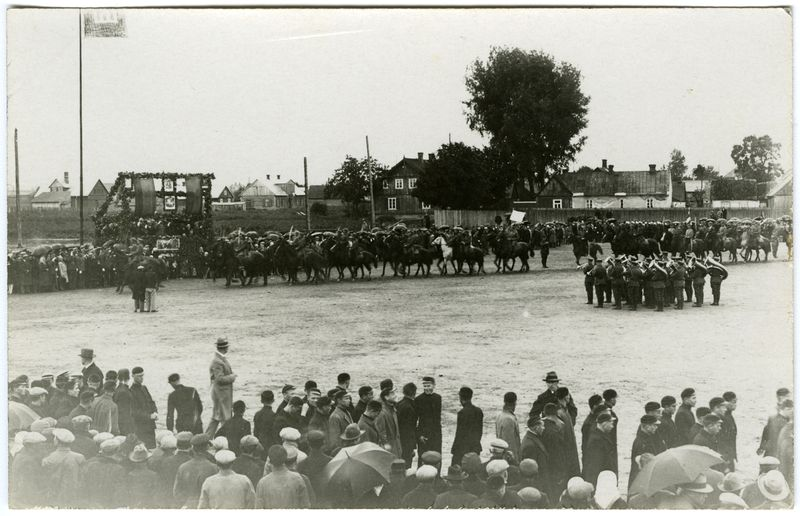
Parade of dragoons of the Lithuanian Riflemen's Union in Marijampolė in 1930

Following the January Uprising and the Russian suppression of the former Commonwealth lands, the powiat of Maryampol was seriously diminished. Also, around that time, the monastery gained prominence as it was the only monastery owned by the Marians that was not closed down by the tsarist authorities. As the surroundings of the town were primarily inhabited by Lithuanians, the town became the centre of the Lithuanian national revival. The proximity of the Prussian border made the smuggling of books in the Lithuanian language, banned in Imperial Russia, easier. Among the most notable Lithuanian scholars and writers active in the town at that time were the future President of Lithuania Kazys Grinius, Jonas Jablonskis and Vincas Kudirka.

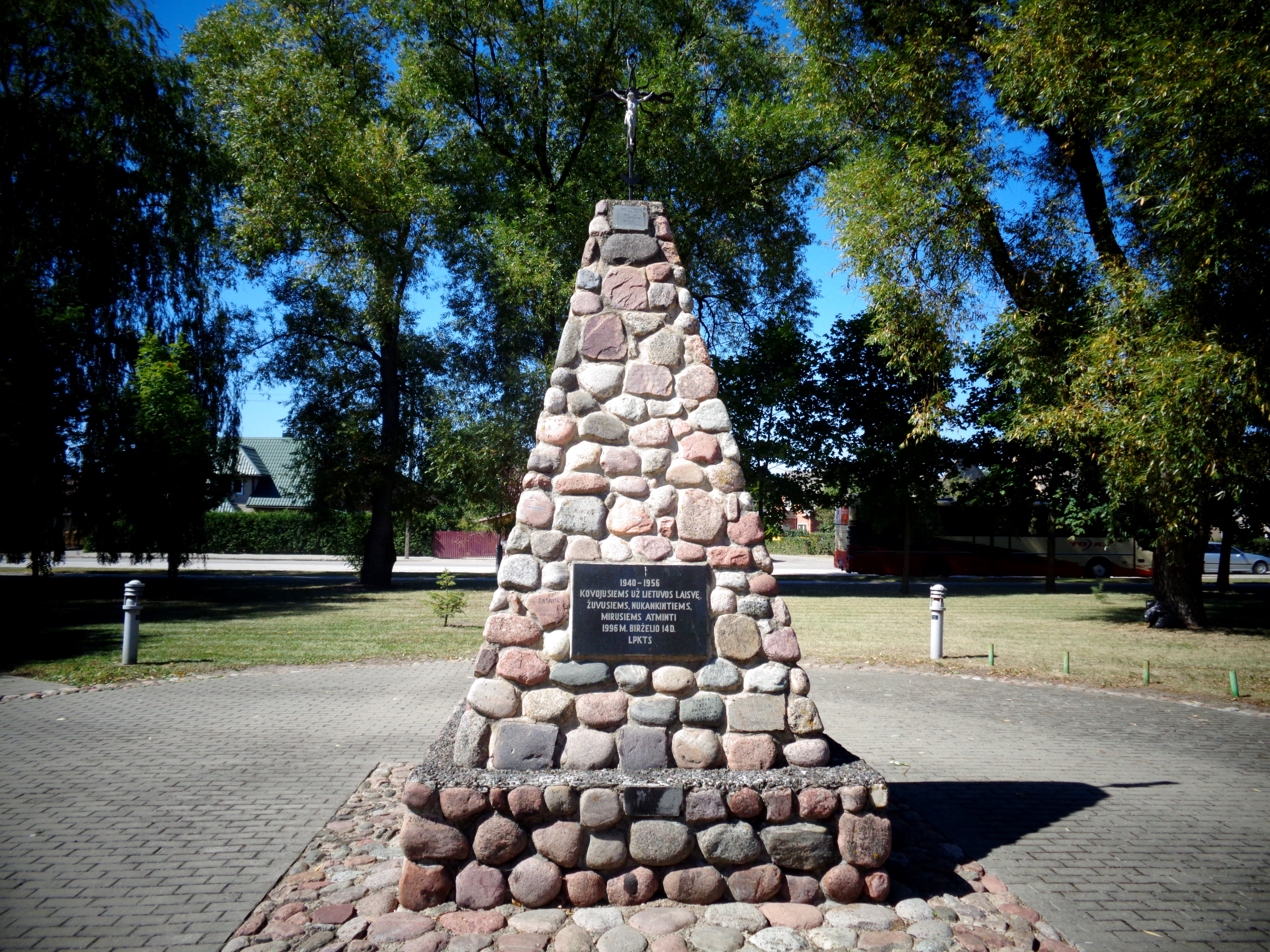
Monument to deported Lithuanians in Marijampolė

Following World War I, the town became part of the restored Lithuania, and the name was standardized to its current form Marijampolė.

During World War II, Marijampolė was occupied by the Soviet Union. During 1940–1941, Soviet authorities deported several hundred Lithuanian inhabitants of Marijampolė. In 1941, Nazi Germany occupied the town. On 1 September 1941, between 5,000 and 8,000 Jews from Marijampolė, Kalvarija and elsewhere, along with people from other backgrounds, were murdered by three German death squads and Lithuanian policemen. Their bodies were placed in mass graves near the Šešupė River. During the war, the town was heavily damaged and almost emptied.

On July 31, 1944 Soviet army once again entered the city. The following year, the Soviet counter-intelligence agency SMERSH repressed about 500 people from Marijampolė. During the first years of Soviet occupation in 1944–1953, Soviet deportations from Lithuania to Siberian gulags included somewhere between 5,000 and 6,000 Lithuanians from Marijampolė county. In late postwar years, the city was rebuilt and repopulated with inhabitants from other parts of Lithuania. About 98% of Marijampolė's inhabitants are ethnic Lithuanians.

On 9 April 1955, Communist authorities of the Lithuanian SSR renamed the town "Kapsukas" after a Lithuanian Communist politician, Vincas Mickevičius-Kapsukas. The old name was restored in 1989, the year before Lithuania declared its independence from the Soviet Union.

Marijampolė has been the administrative centre of the county since 1994. In 2018, on the 100th anniversary of the restoration of the independence of Lithuania, the city of Marijampolė became the cultural capital of Lithuania.

The Anshe Sholom B'nai Israel synagogue in Chicago was founded by immigrants from Marijampolė. Other Jewish migrants from Marijampolė settled in Manchester and Leeds, United Kingdom.

== Transport ==
Marijampolė is accessible by railway via the Kaunas-Šeštokai-Alytus line. The town is located at the crossroads of two major highways: The Via Baltica connects Helsinki with Central and Southern Europe, and the European route E28 runs between Berlin, Germany, and Minsk, Belarus.

== Industry and economy ==
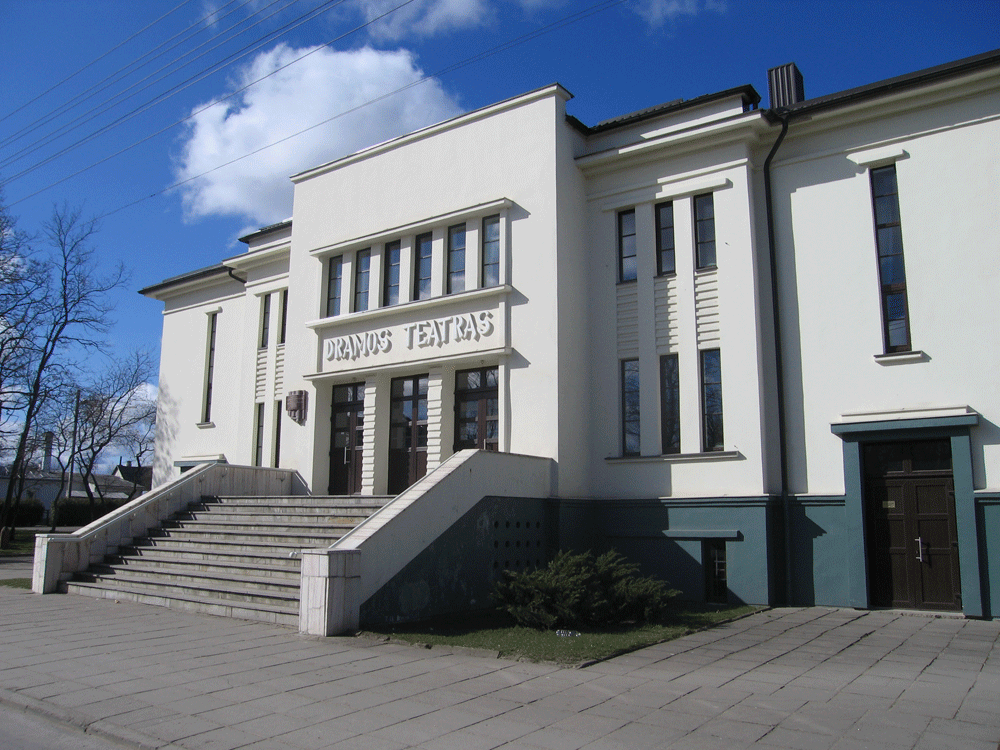
Marijampolė drama theater

Marijampolė is connected to its partners by business, sport, education, tourism, and other ties. Marijampolė's local means of mass media include a local television station, a local radio station, the newspapers "Marijampolės laikraštis", "Suvalkietis", "TV savaitė", "Sugrįžimai", and magazine "Suvalkija". Culturally, Marijampolė enjoys one cinema and a municipal drama theater.

Marijampolė is a regional centre of light industry enterprises, construction, transport and trade. It has also become home to one of the largest second-hand car markets in Europe.

== Education ==
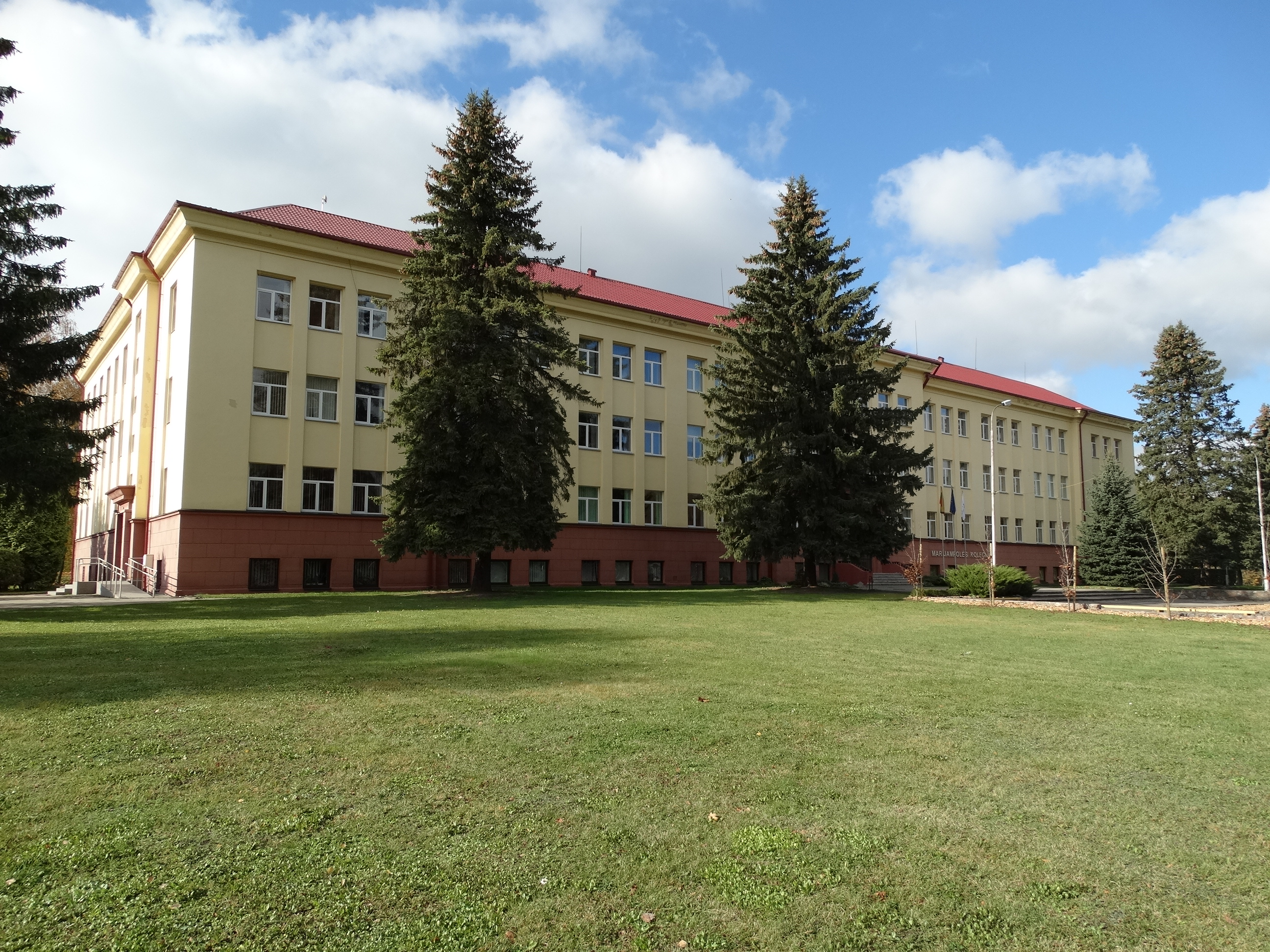
Marijampolė University of Applied Sciences

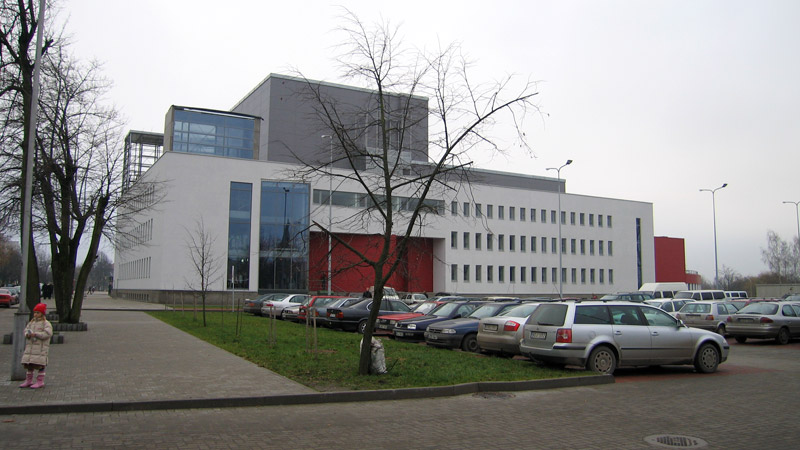
Marijampolė Palace of Culture

Marijampolė has a strong educational system with state education institutions. The city is the seat of Marijampolė University of Applied Sciences, as well as nine pre-school institutions, six nursery schools, one primary school, 12 lower secondary schools, nine secondary schools, four gymnasiums, a youth school, an adult education center, five additional training establishments, three non-state education institutions, a music school of Christian Culture, the Gymnasium of Marijonai, and the R. Vosylienė languages school.

== Marijampolė Municipality ==
Marijampolė has a City Council with 27 members. The members of the City Council represent different Lithuanian political parties.

The Marijampolė Municipality is adjacent to the Vilkaviškis District Municipality in the west, Kazlų Rūda Municipality in the north, Kalvarija Municipality in the south, and the Prienai District Municipality and Alytus District Municipality in the east.

The town of Marijampolė and its six surrounding communities make up the territory of Marijampolė Municipality. They are: Gudeliai, Igliauka, Liudvinavas, Marijampolė, Sasnava, and Šunskai communities. Marijampolė Municipality covers 755 square kilometres (292 sq mi) of land; 72% of which is agricultural land; 12.3% is covered by forests; 4.2% is towns and villages, 2% is industrial enterprises and roads, and 6.9% is areas used for other purposes.

== Twin towns – sister cities ==
Marijampolė is twinned with:

- Bergisch Gladbach, Germany
- Kokkola, Finland
- Kvam, Norway
- Lesja, Norway
- (Republic of Ireland) Mayo County, Ireland
- Piotrków Trybunalski, Poland
- Reșița, Romania
- Rogozno, Poland
- Suwałki, Poland
- Valga, Estonia
- Valka, Latvia
- Viborg, Denmark

== Notable people ==
- Ovidijus Vyšniauskas, a Lithuanian musician. The first Lithuania representer at Eurovision Song Contest in 1994.
- Violeta Urmana, opera singer, an honorary citizen of the city.
- Moshe Rosenthalis (1922–2008), Lithuanian-Israeli painter.
- Darius Songaila, basketball player.
- Saulius Brusokas, male weightlifter and strongman competitor.
- Sue Perkins, British comedienne; great grandmother from Mariampolė.
- Vytautas Kašuba, Lithuanian-American sculptor.

== Gallery ==
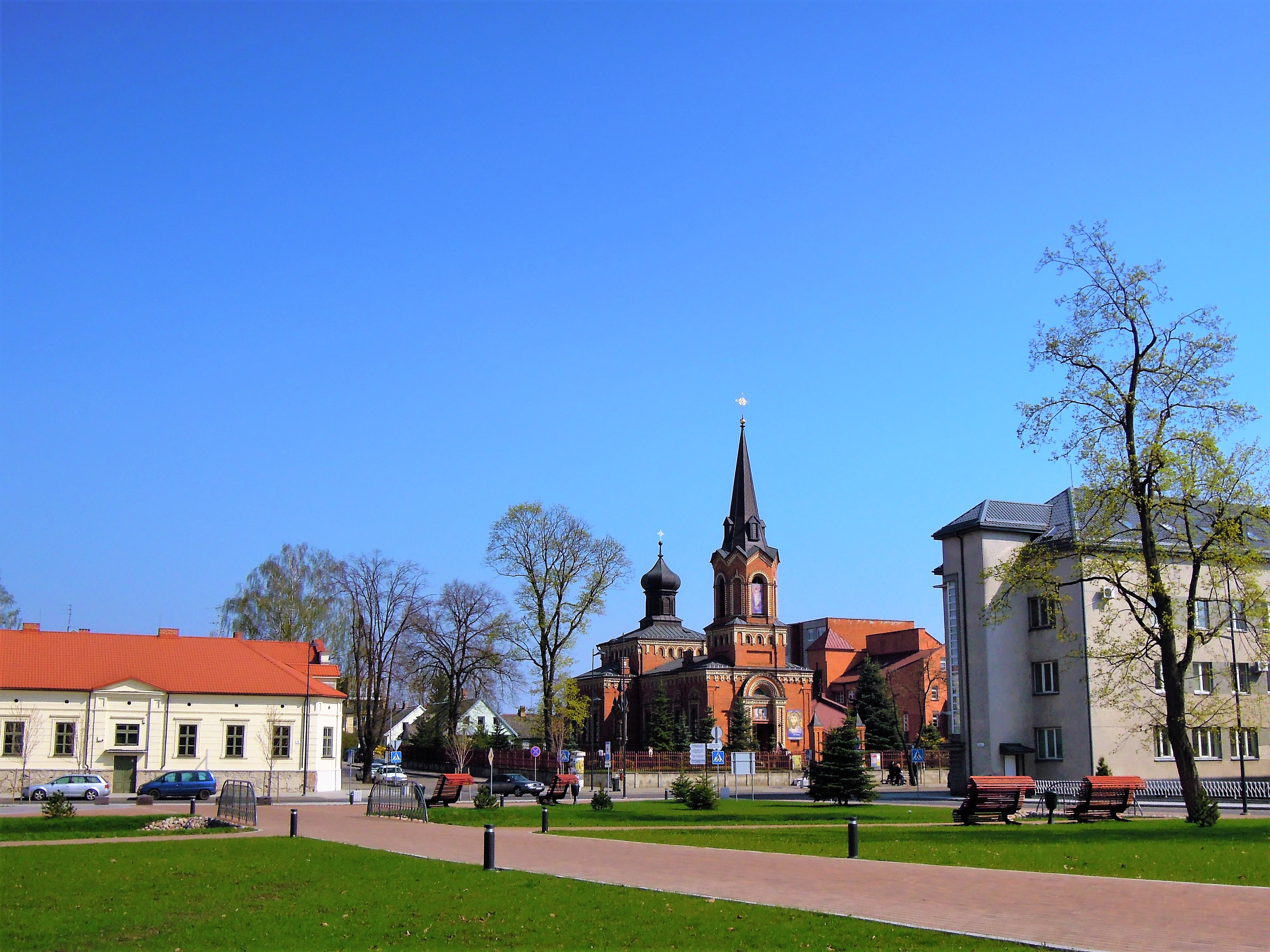
Old Town

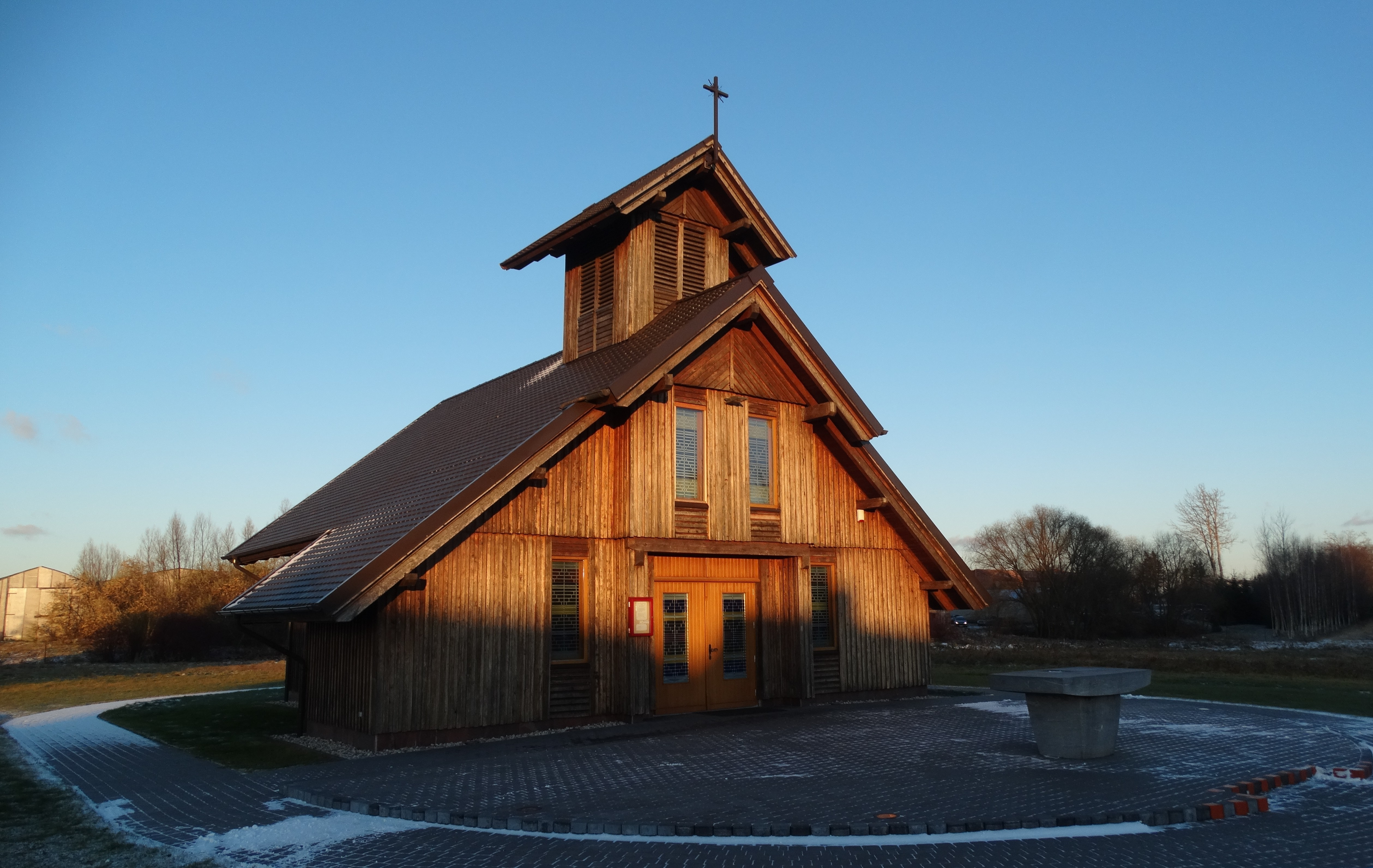
Pope John Paul II Parish Chapel

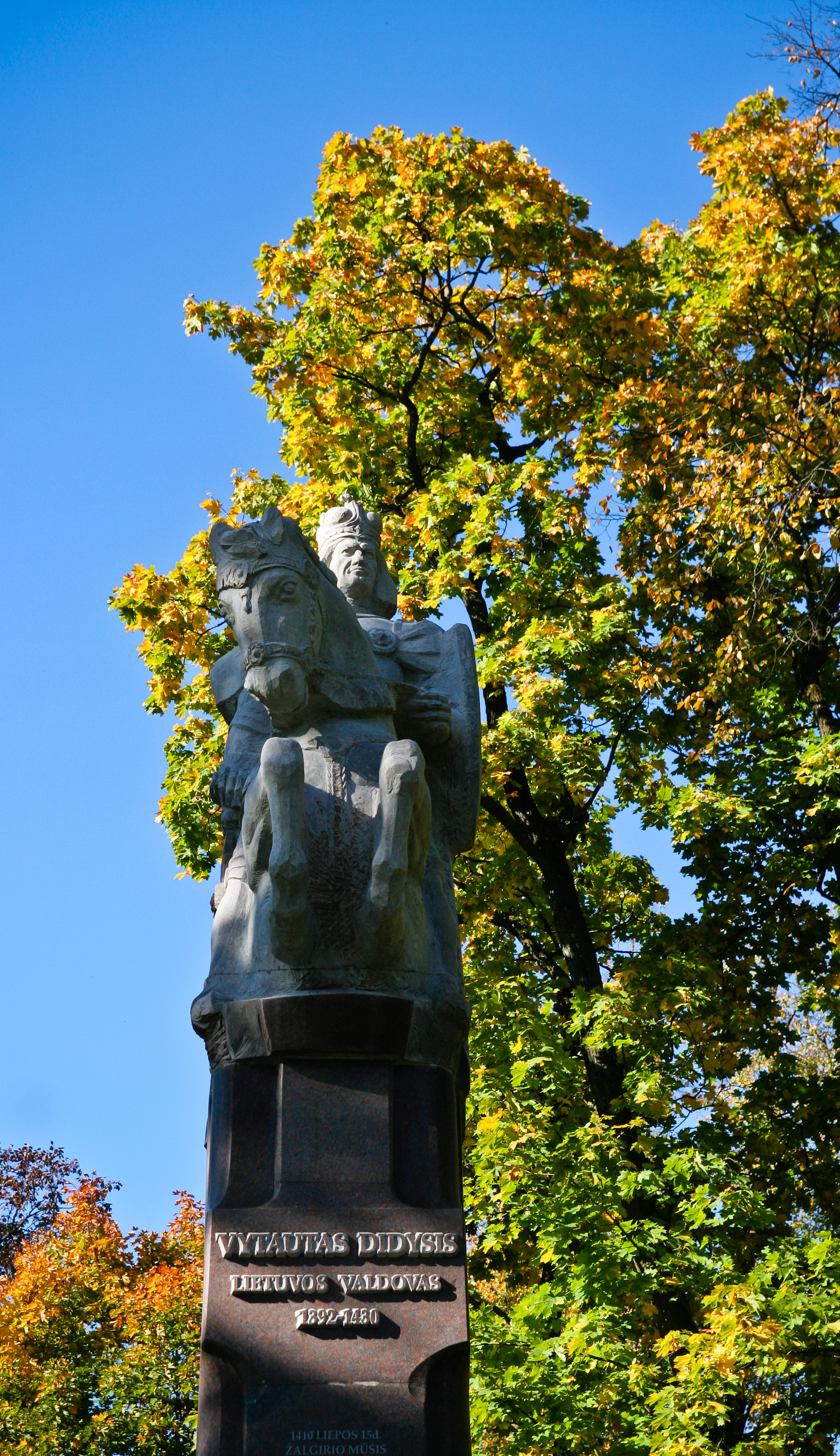
Monument for Vytautas the Great

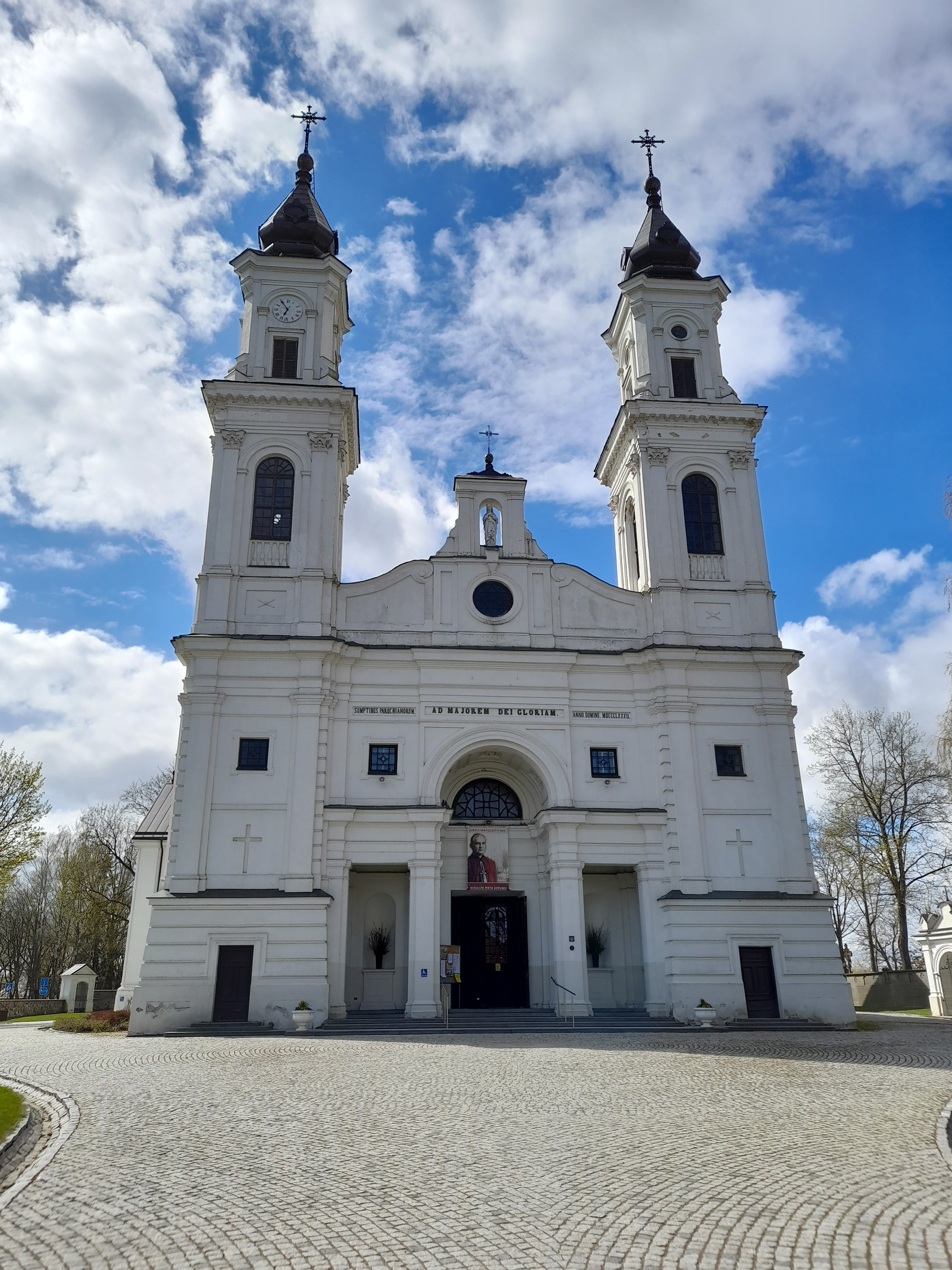
St. Michael's Small Basilica

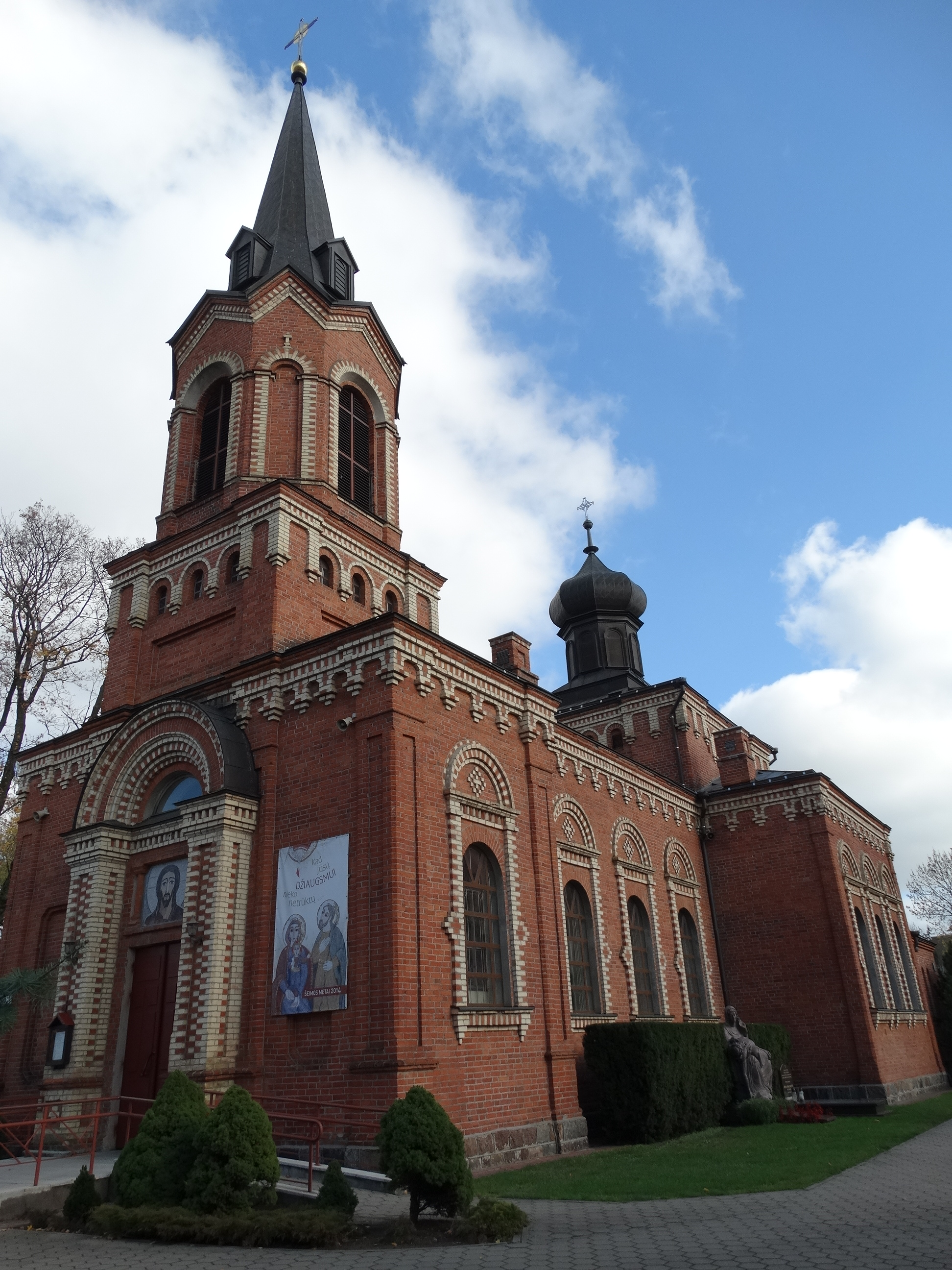
Church of Saint Vincent de Paul

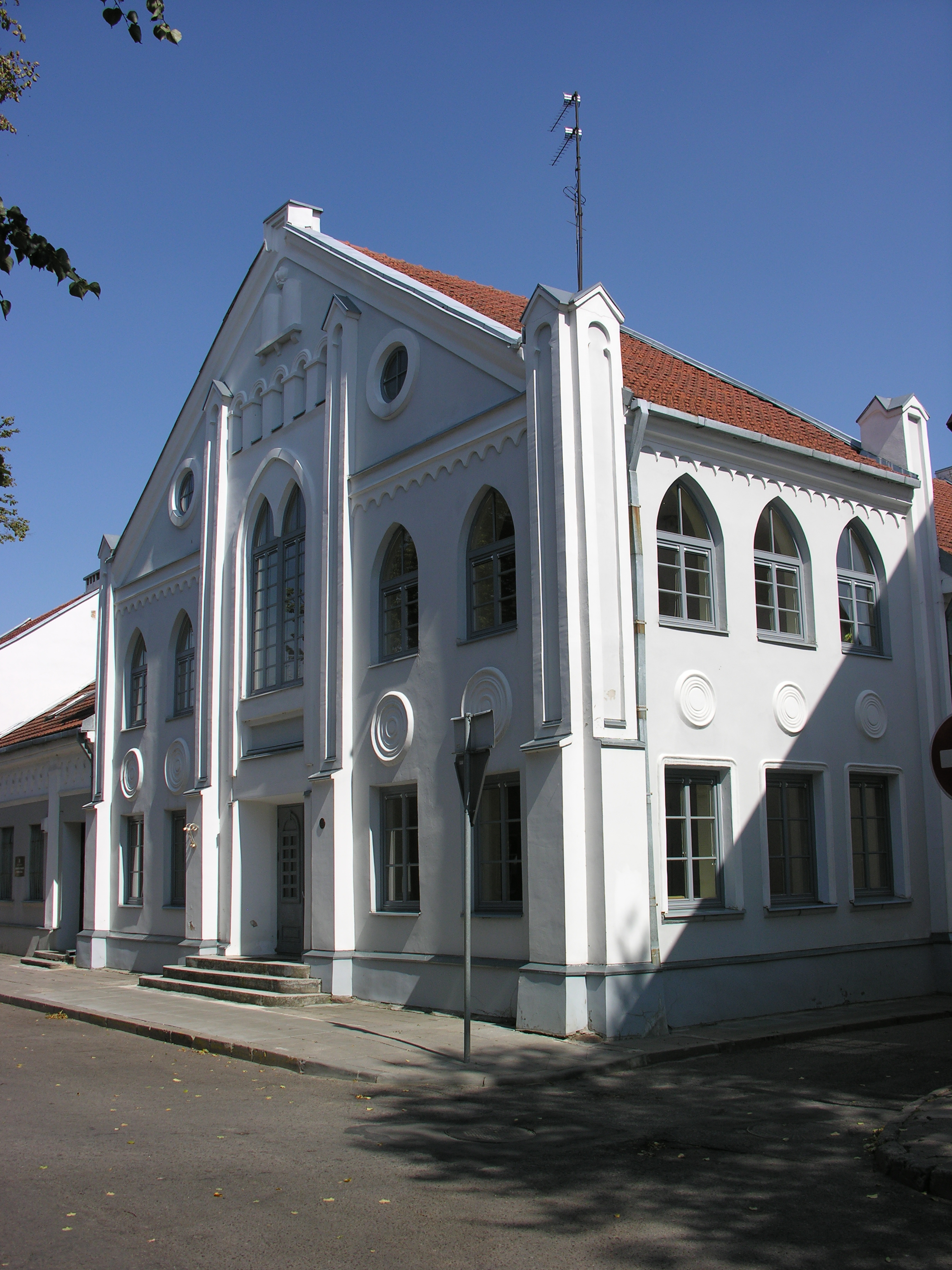
Marijampolė Synagogue

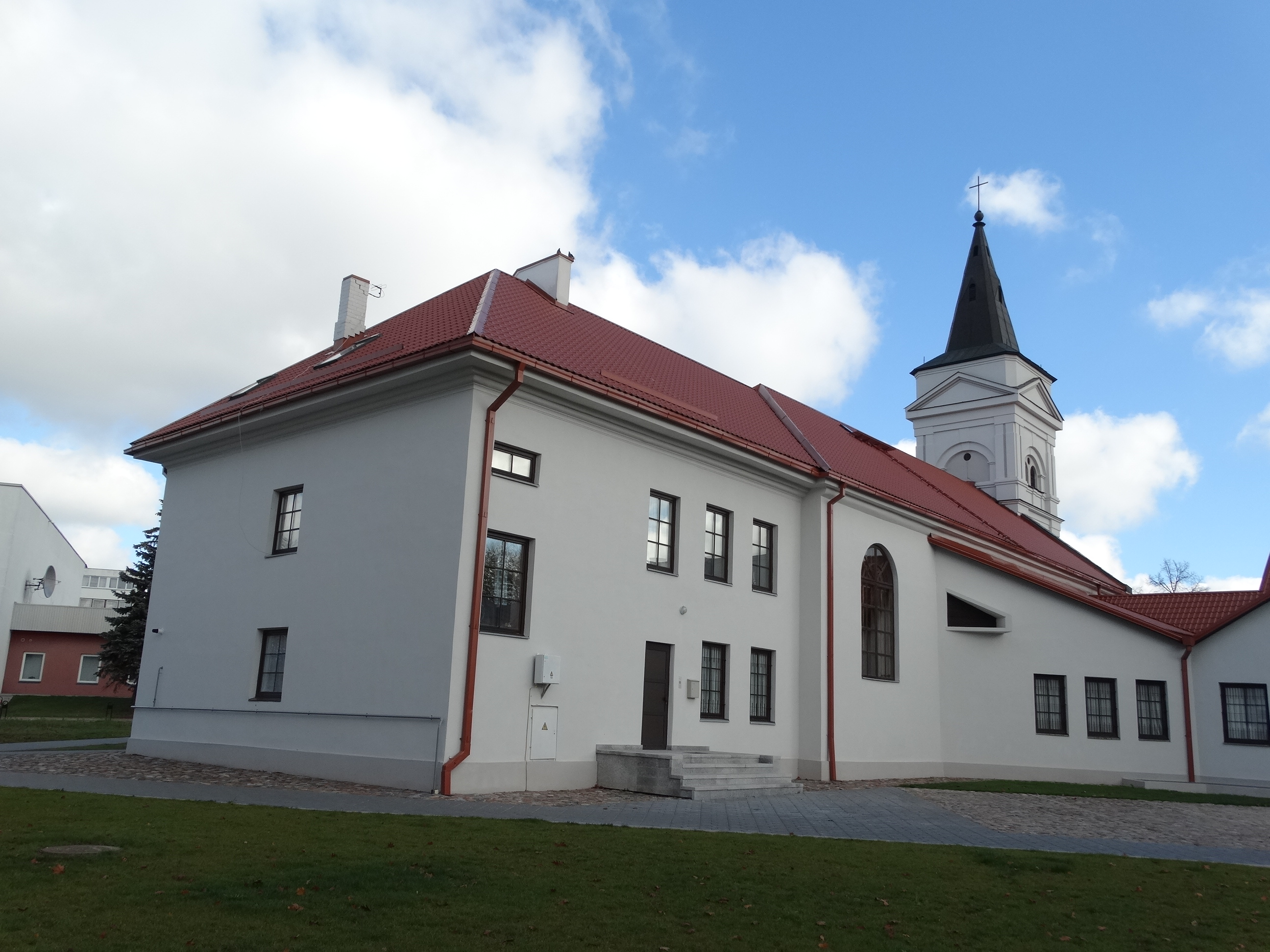
Marijampolė Evangelical Lutheran Church

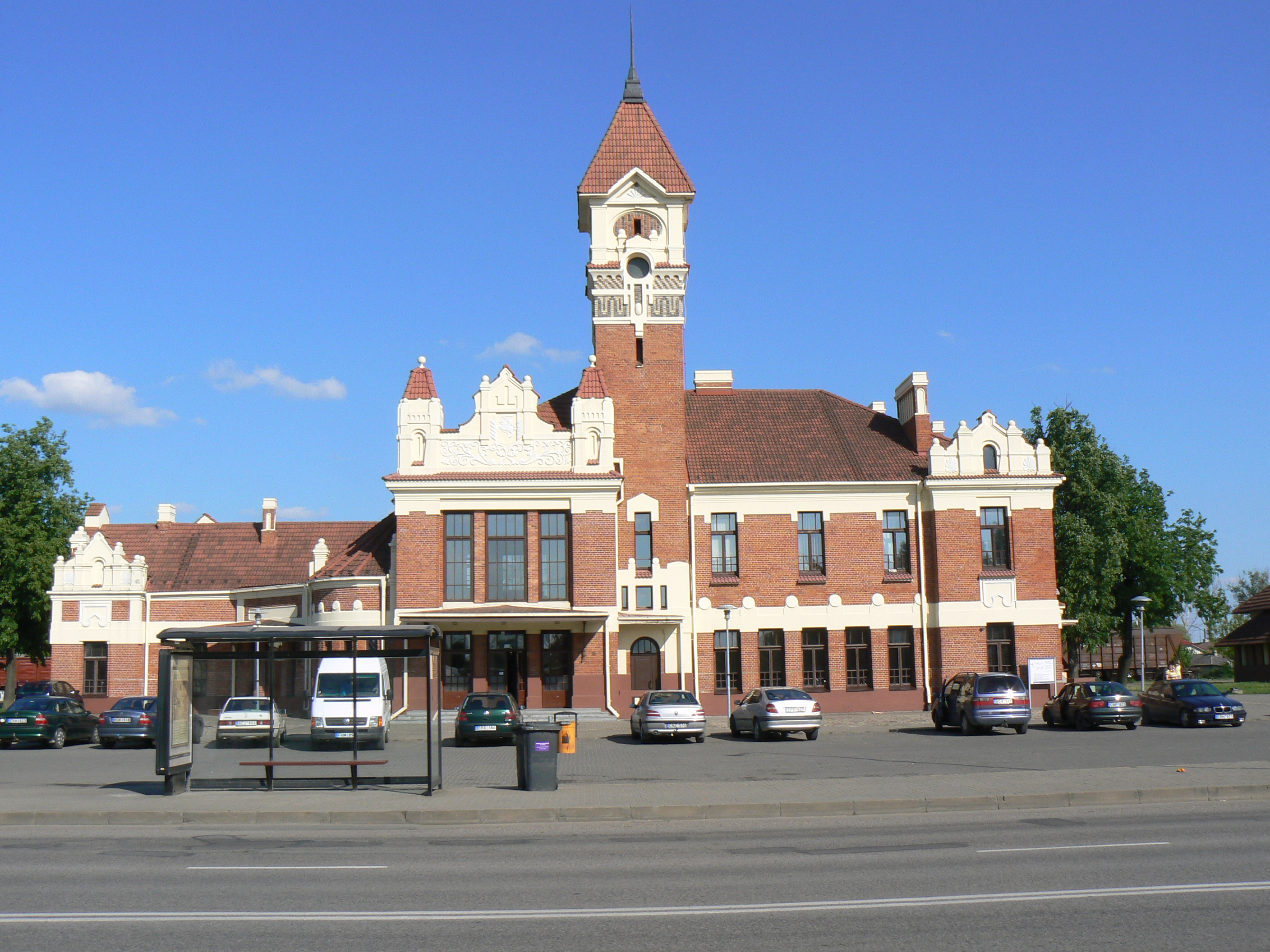
Marijampolė Railway Station

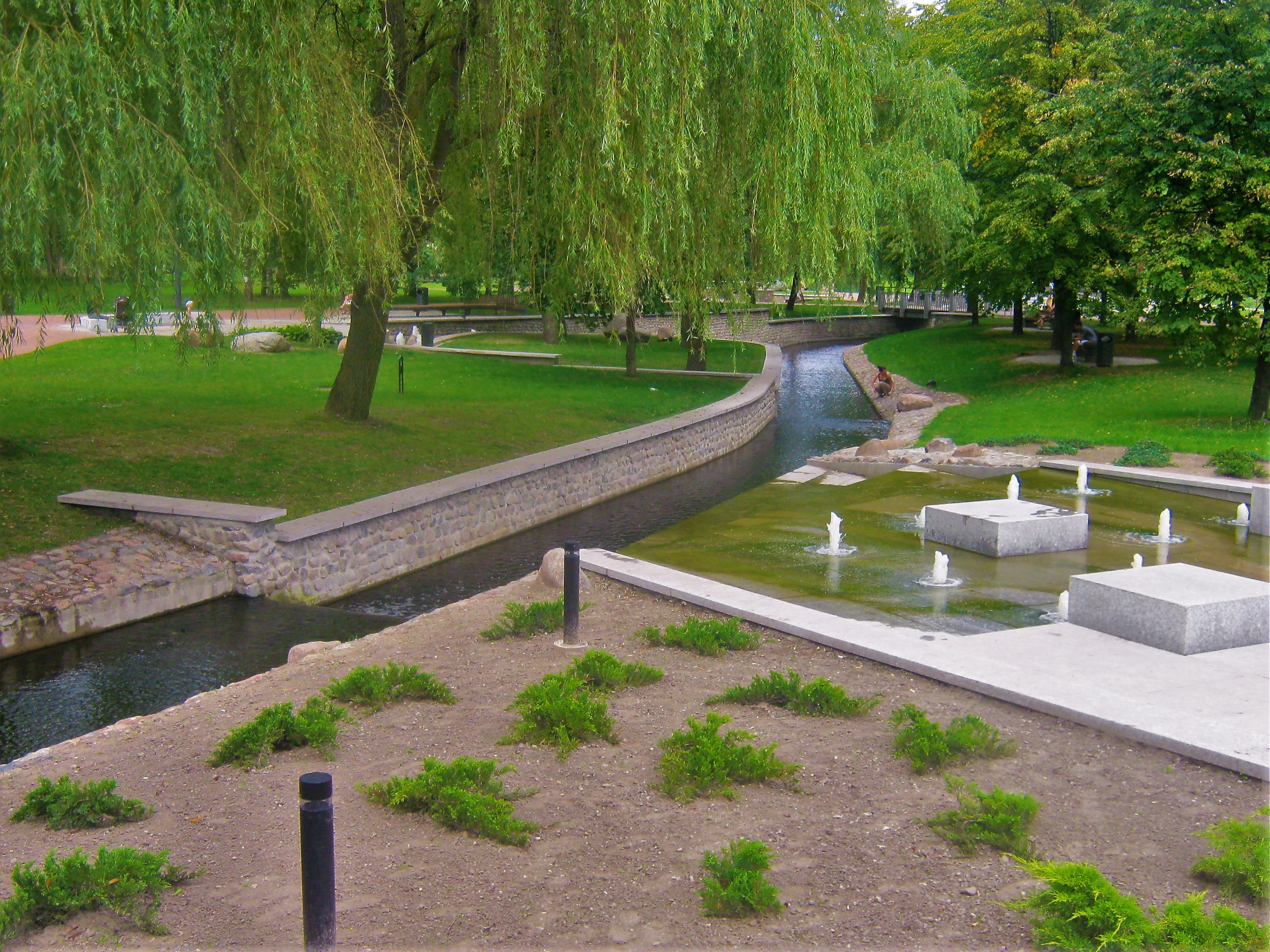
Marijampolė park of "Poetry"

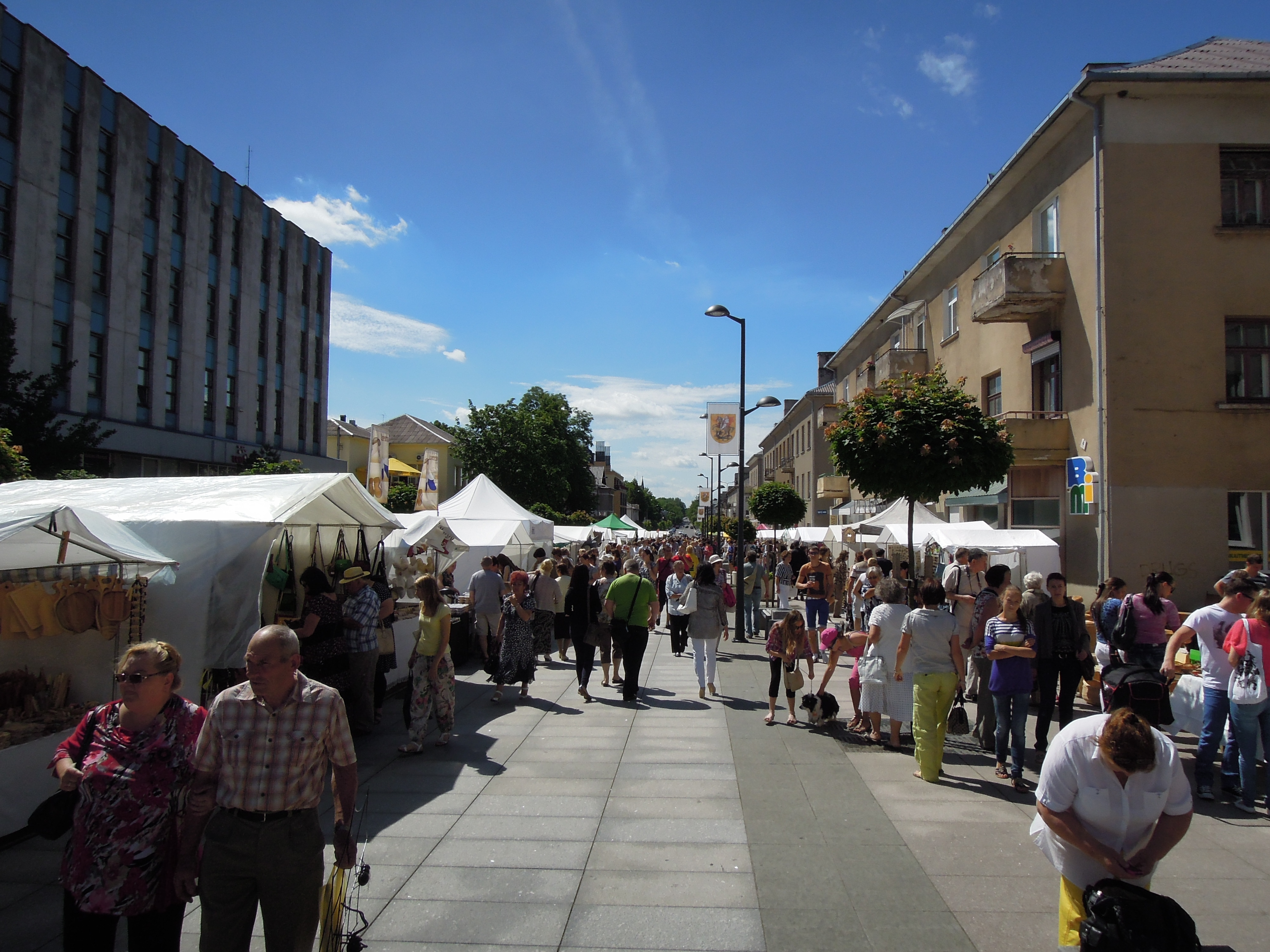
City days 2013

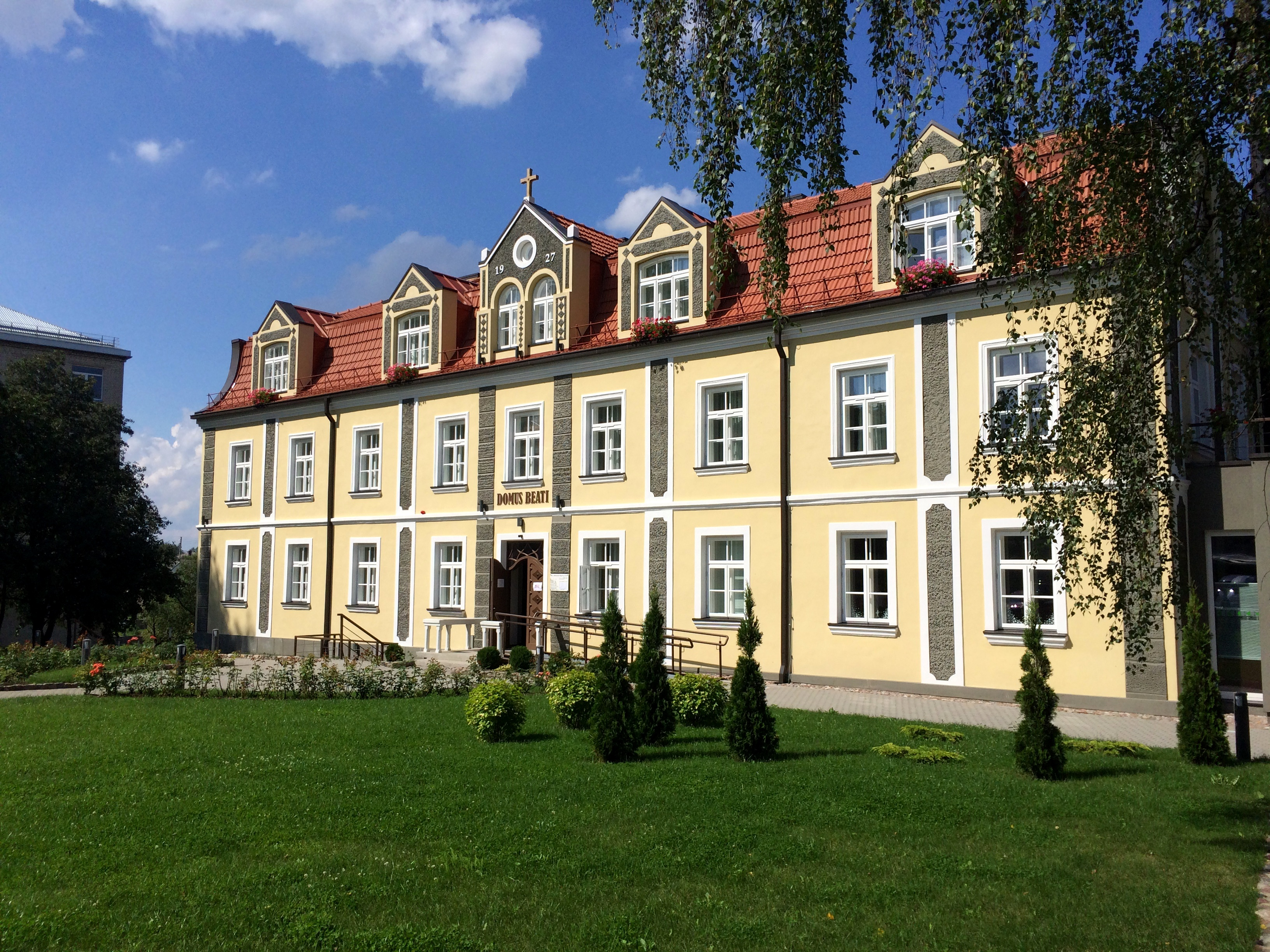
The House of Pilgrims Domus Beati

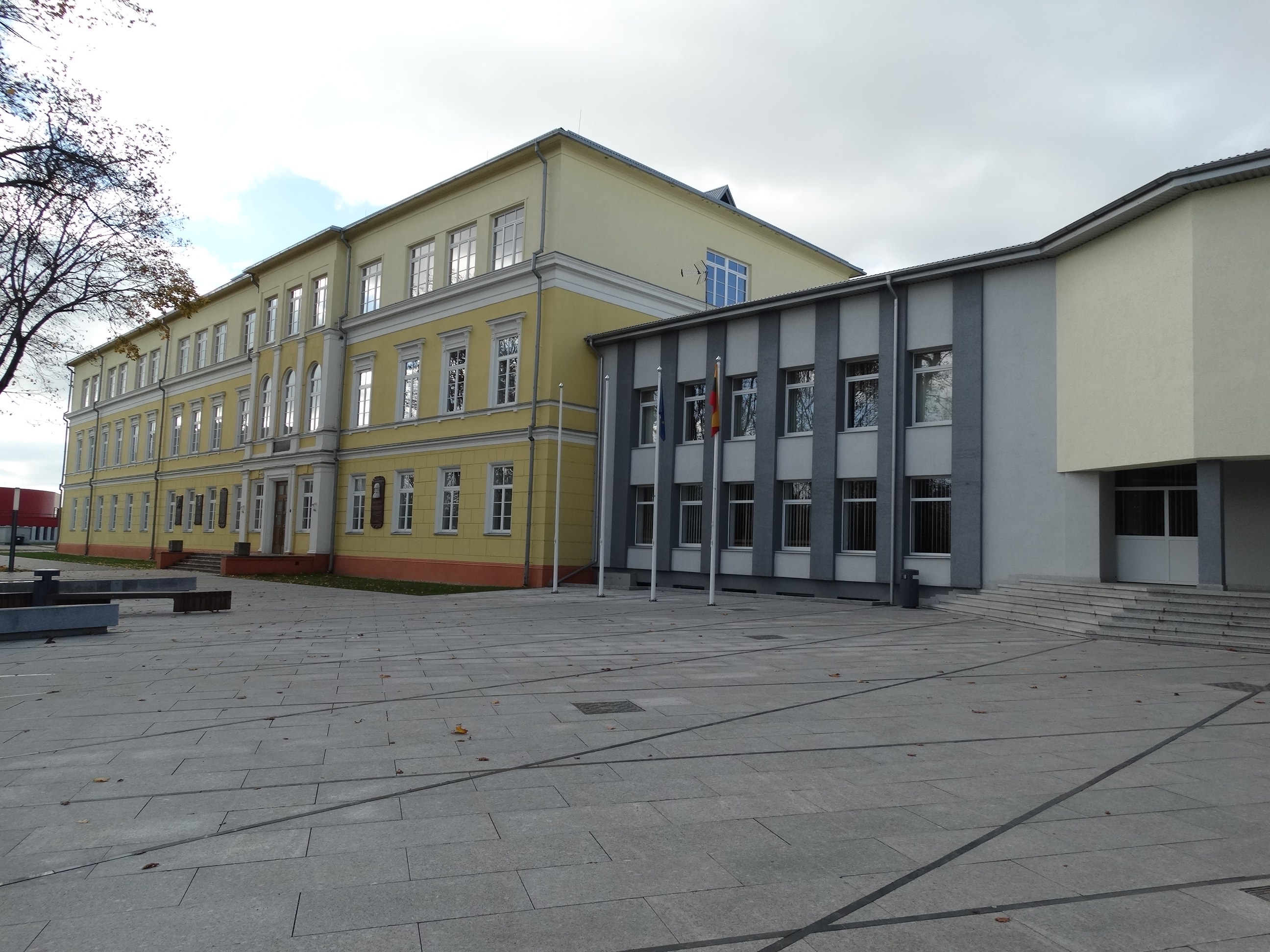
Marijampolė Rygiškių Jonas Gymnasium

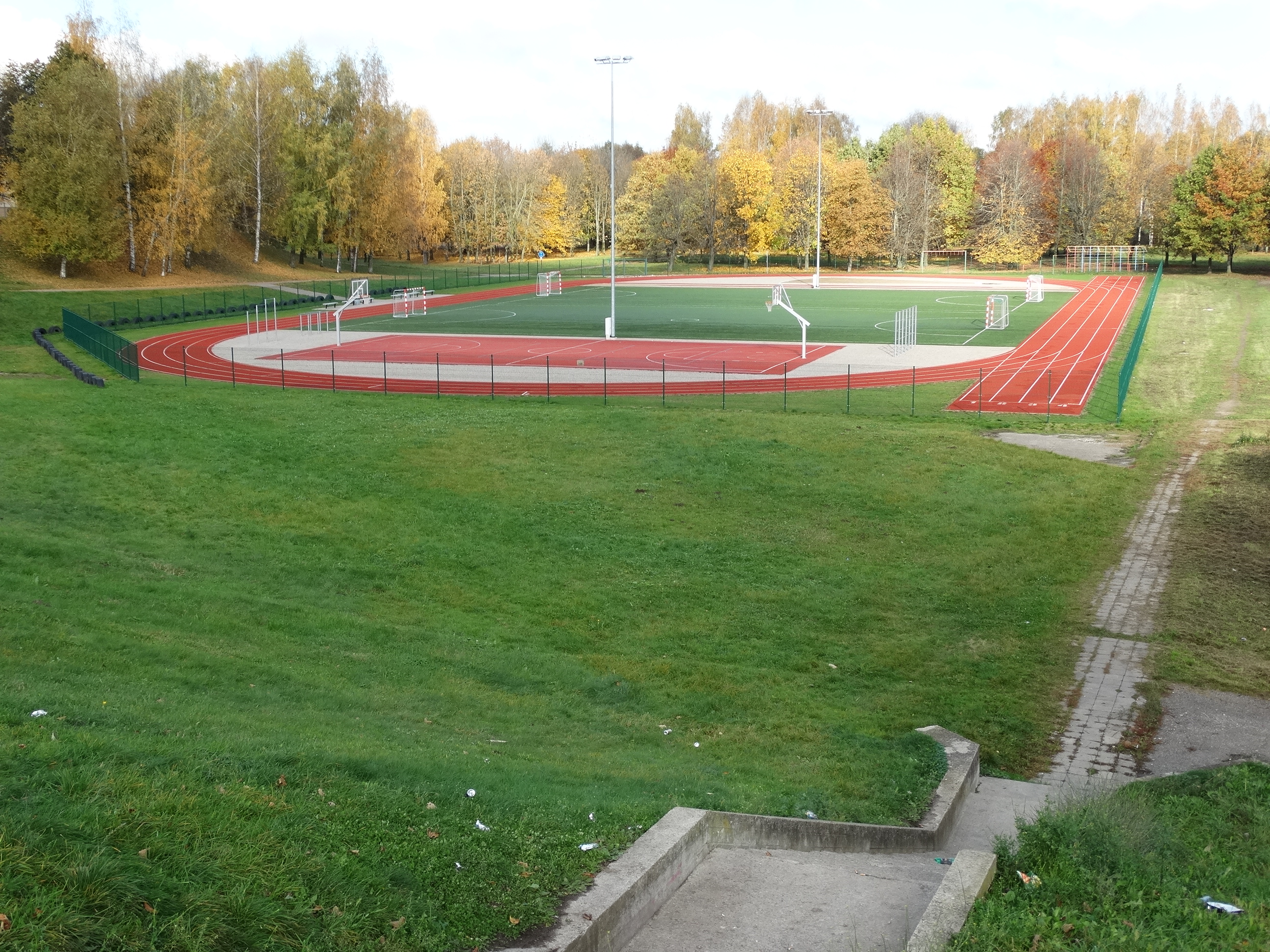
Marijampolė Gymnasium stadium

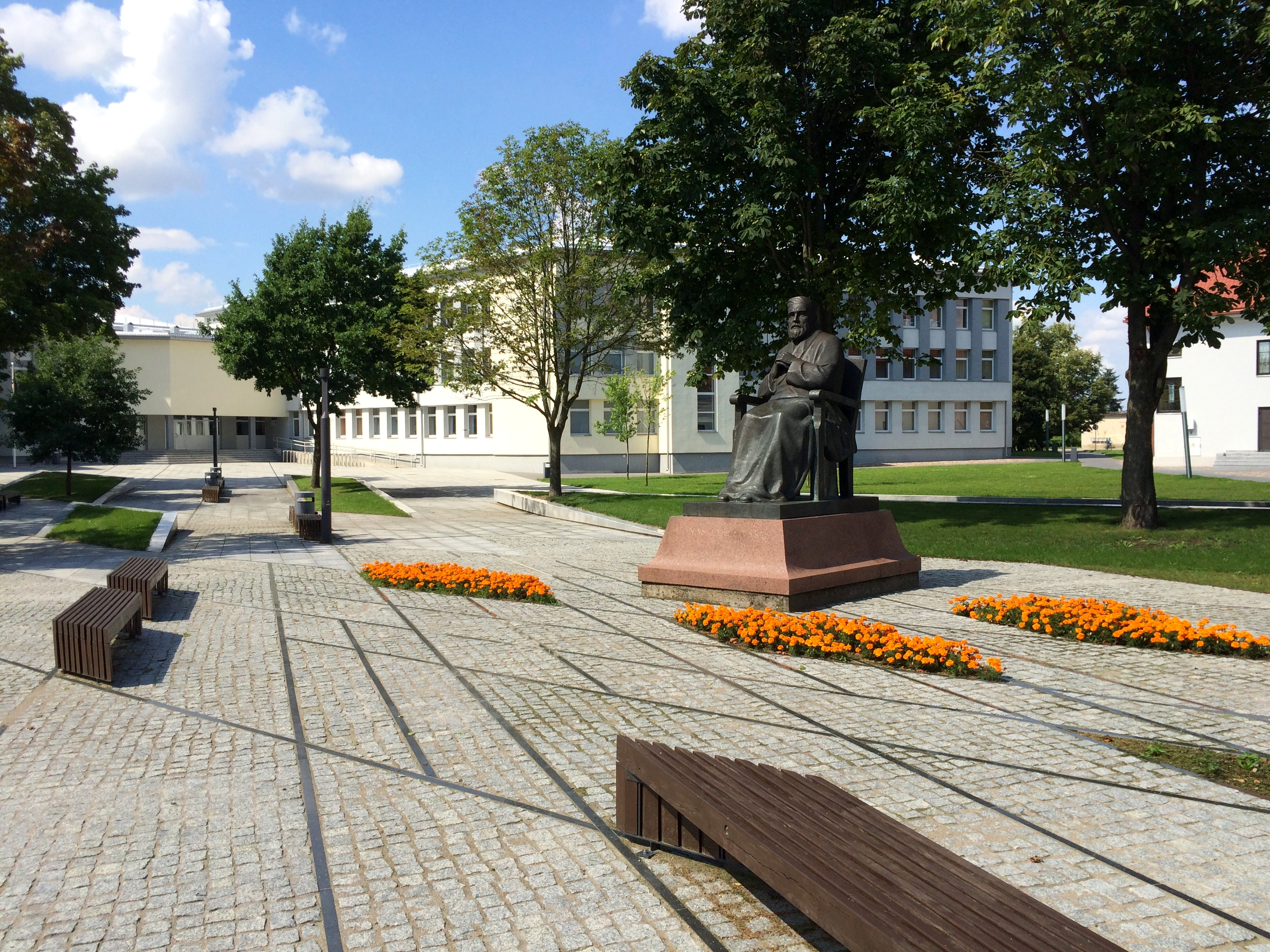
Monument for Jonas Jablonskis

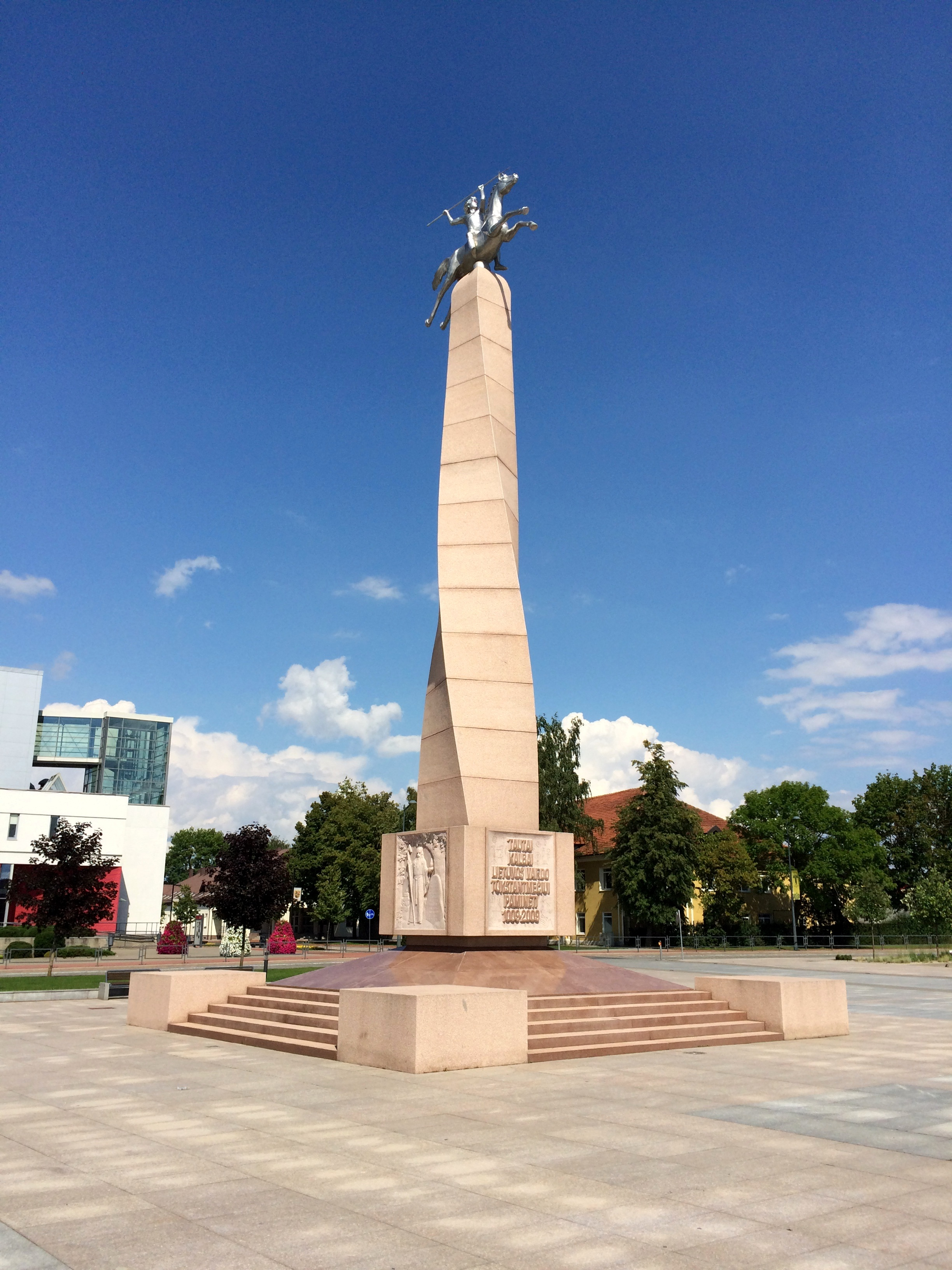
Monument for the millennia of Lithuania
