= Antanavas =

- Village
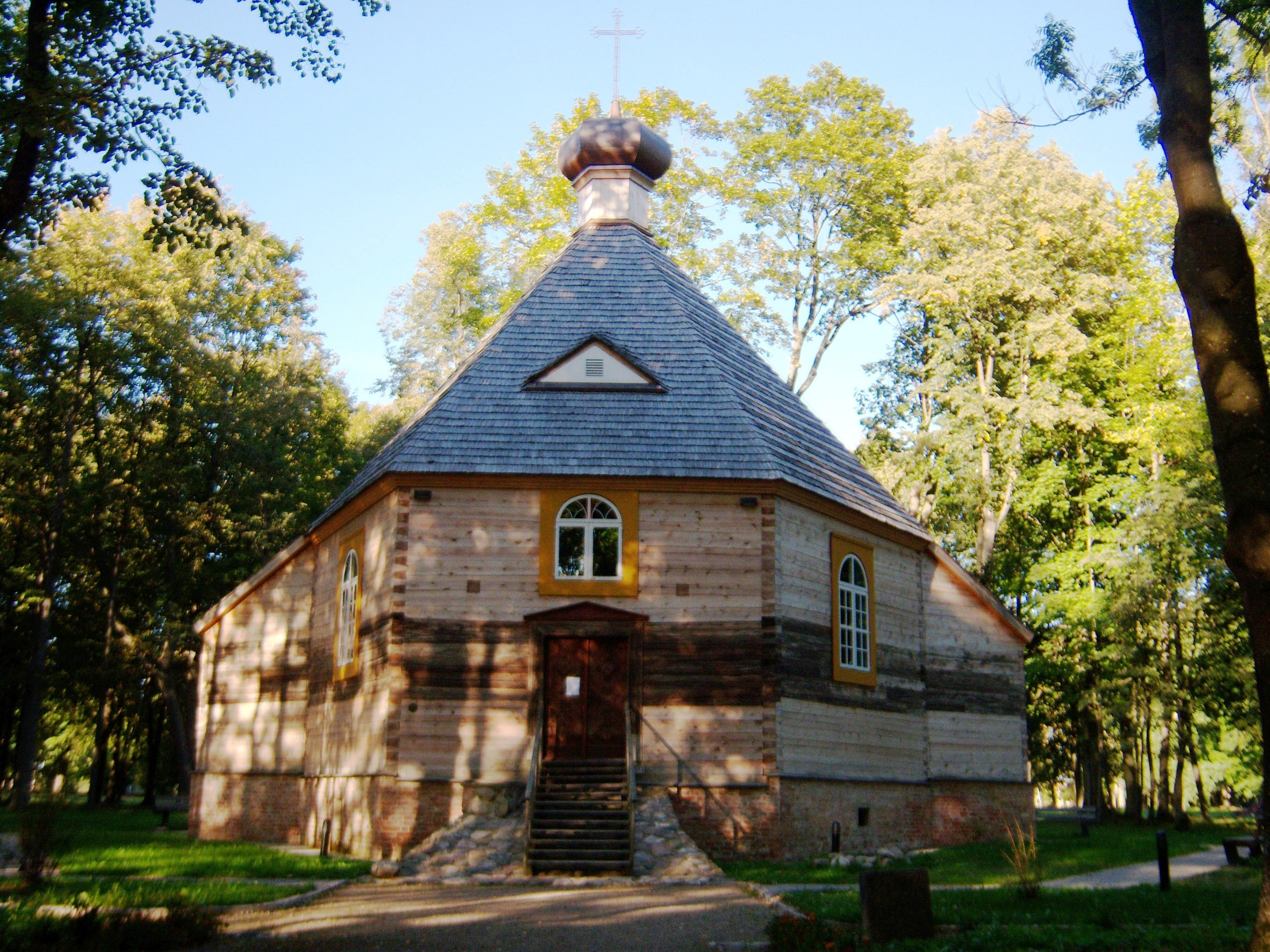
- Antanavas chapel

- Flag Coat of arms

- Location within Lithuania
- Coordinates: 54.7028°N 23.3042°E
- Country: Lithuania
- County: Marijampolė County
- Municipality: Kazlų Rūda Municipality
- Eldership: Antanavas Eldership

Government
  - Elder: Artūras Urbonas

Population (2021)
  - Total: 562
- Time zone: UTC+2 (EET)
  - Summer (DST): UTC+3 (EEST)

Antanavas is a village in Marijampolė County, Lithuania, the center of the Antanavas Eldership. The village belongs to the Kazlų Rūda Municipality and is located about 15 kilometers south-west of Kazlų Rūda. The river Pilvė flows along the northern edge of the village. Near Antanavas there is a hydroelectric power station. According to the 2021 Lithuanian census, the village had a population of 562 residents.

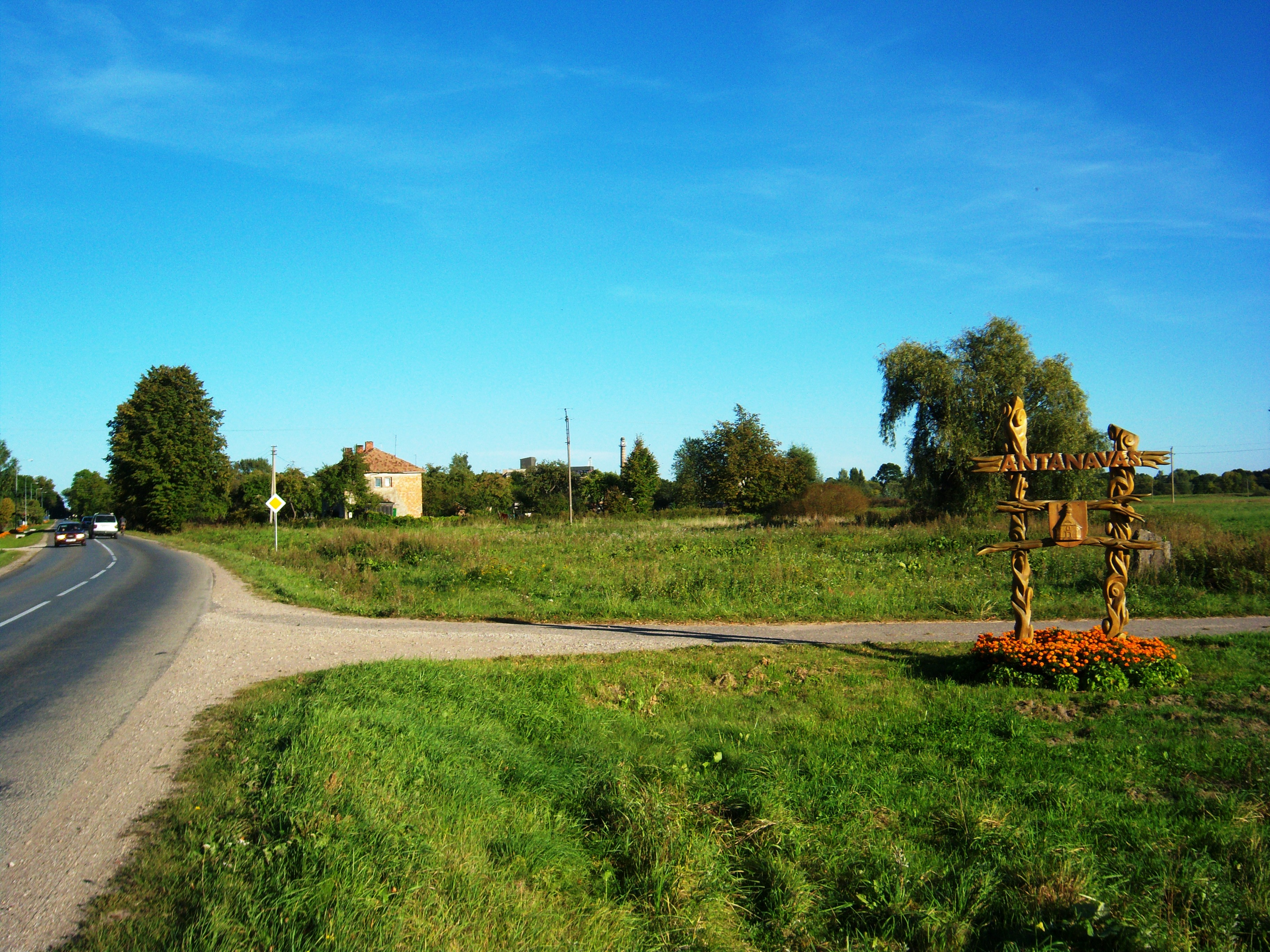
Antanavas town sign

== Etymology ==
The name of the village is believed to have originated from the middle name of the 18th-century owner of the Antanavas manor, Jonas Antanas Chrapovickis. In the inter-war period of the 20th century, the village was called Antanava.

In other languages Antanavas is referred to as: Polish: Antonowo

== History ==
=== Early history ===
The Birštonas Forest Inventory of 1578 records haying on the Galinialaukis plain near the Šešupė River, which is the present territory of Antanavas. The place is mentioned more frequently from the 18th century when the Antanavas Manor belonging to a statesman of the Grand Duchy of Lithuania Jonas Antanas Chrapovickis (Jan Antoni Chrapowicki) was founded. At the end of the 18th century, on the initiative of the Chrapovnicki family, a spirits distillery was established, and a hexagonal chapel with two sacristies and deep cellars was built with hewn timbers. It was intended to become the family mausoleum, but it did not fulfill this purpose lords themselves used to attend prayers at the Pilviškiai church, and the chapel was "given" to the local peasants.

=== 19th century ===
During the partitions, Antanavas was part of Congress Poland, a satellite state of the Russian Empire. In the mid-19th century, Antanavas manor was bought by the nobleman Stasys Šabunevičius, who owned other manors: the most well-known of them in Suvalkija is Karalkrėslis. Šabunevičius family owned the manor until World War II. During the 1863 Uprising, the manor hosted a summit of rebels from the Augustów Governorate. The basement of the chapel was used to store the weapons of the rebels. In 1864, a wooden cross, funded by Ona Šabunevičienė, was erected to commemorate the rebels.

During the period of the Lithuanian press ban, a Russian school was opened on the estate (from 1865). At the same time, the children were secretly taught Lithuanian by the schoolmaster, and the residents of Antanavas were supplied with banned Lithuanian press by book smugglers.

In 1890, the spirits distillery was expanded to become a larger enterprise. At that time, Pranciškus, the father of the future Lithuanian agricultural strategist Mykolas Krupavičius, also worked as a brewer. In addition to beer and vodka, distillery also produced Antanavas liqueur, which was sold in Vilnius, Warsaw and other larger cities. The distillery employed seven craftsmen ( blacksmiths, barrel makers, boiler operators and others) on a permanent basis, with up to 30 additional employees.

During World War I, in April 1915, the Imperial Russian Army fought against German troops in the Gaisriai – Antanavas Manor area but was forced to retreat. The manor building was damaged in the fighting, but the distillery continued to operate.

=== Interwar ===
During the land reform of 1919–1939, a significant part of the manor's land was distributed to landless and petty farmers, but the Šabunevičius family redistributed it among their relatives to keep as much land as possible. The manor house, the central buildings, the yeast brewery, and the spirits distillery remained in the possession of the Šabunevičius family.

In 1923, the manor and the village had 265 inhabitants. Later, the distillery began to slip out of the family's hands; it was first leased and then eventually sold to four Jewish men from Kaunas. In 1932, a post office was opened on the manor, which was used by all the residents of the village.

=== World War II and later ===
During World War II, in 1940, the Soviets confiscated the former Šabunevičius distillery and most of the estate. Later, the German army, which captured the village, arrested the distillery's foreman in the first days of the occupation. The Jew owners at the time, never returned to the estate.

In 1944, the manor buildings and the distillery were used as a base for a unit of the French Fighter Squadron 2/30 Normandie-Niemen, which made flights to East Prussia.

In the post-war years, Lithuanian partisans of the Tauras military district were active in the area of Antanavas.

The chapel was heavily damaged and deteriorated since the war. However, until 1963, the congregation was still attending services. In 1963, Mass was held for the last time, as it had become too dangerous to gather in the rundown premises. The chapel was given to the Antanavas distillery, and the paintings and liturgical items were taken to the Atheism Museum in Vilnius, which was established by the occupying Soviet Union in the Church of St. Casimir.

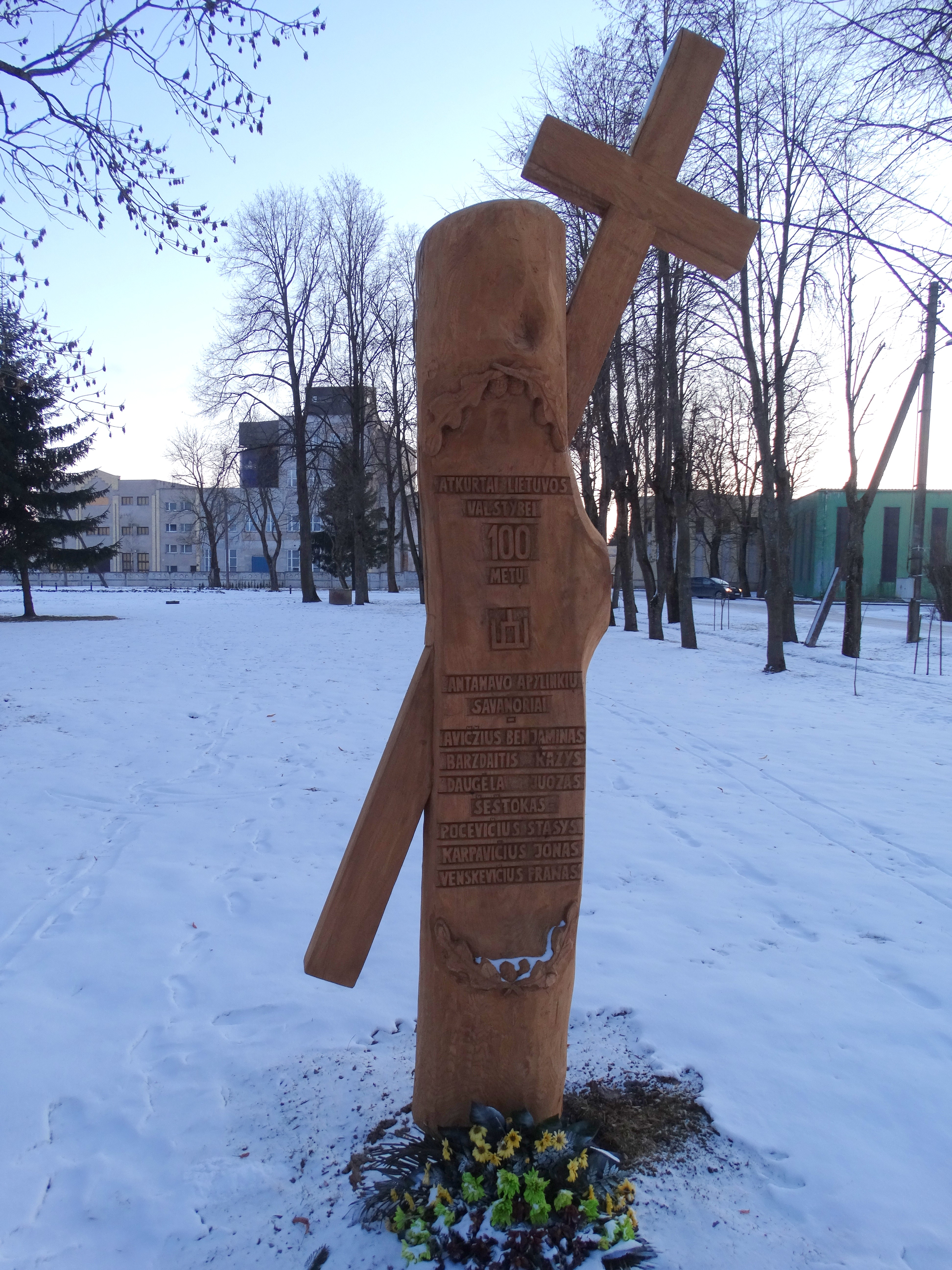
Memorial for 100 years since the independence of Lithuania

=== 21st century ===
In 2002, the Antanavas Community Association was established. One of the main goals of the community was the restoration of the chapel and the park of the manor, the community submitted a petition to the Bishop of Vilkaviškis, the Municipality of Kazlų Rūda and the Department of Cultural Heritage under the Ministry of Culture, with more than 300 signatures of the residents of Antanavas. The lack of funds delayed the start of restoration works and on 30 April 2005 the roof of the chapel collapsed.

In 2009, the coat of arms and flag of Antanavas was adopted by the decree of the President of the Republic of Lithuania Dalia Grybauskaitė.

In 2009, the two-year-long restoration and reconstruction of the Antanavas chapel began. On 9 July 2011, on the celebration of the 250th anniversary of Antanavas, the Bishop of Vilkaviškis, Rimantas Norvila, consecrated the newly restored chapel and conferred on it the title of the Blessed Virgin Mary, the Patroness of Families.
