= Antanavas Manor =

Coordinates: 54°42′2″N 23°18′25″E

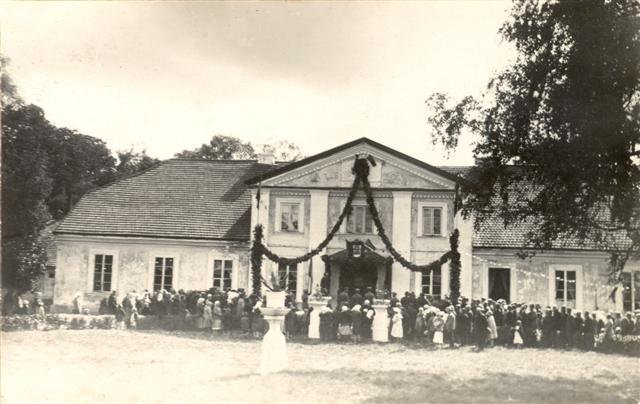
- Residential manor
- Interactive map of the Antanavas Manor area

General information
- Location: Antanavas, Lithuania

Antanavas Manor is a former residential manor in Antanavas village, Kazlų Rūda municipality.
