= Alfredo Nigro =

Italian opera singer

Alfredo Nigro is an Italian tenor.

== Biography and career ==
Nigro was born in Manduria and grew up in Erchie (Brindisi). After studying at the Conservatory "Nino Rota" in Monopoli (a town in the province of Bari), the tenor studied at the Academy for Opera Singers at La Scala in Milan from 2001 to 2003. His teachers included Leyla Gencer, Teresa Berganza, Ghena Dimitrova, Luigi Alva and Luciana Serra.

He sang in the World Premiere of Narciso Sabbadini's "The Divine Providence" (for the beatification of Don Giovanni, Calabria) with the "Virtuosi di Praga", to "Social" in Mantua, the "Philharmonic" of Verona, and the Opera House in Prague for Czech Radio and TV.

At the Teatro della Scala in Milan, he sang Giuseppe Verdi's Un giorno di Regno,

Samson et Dalila (with Gary Bertini), the Sarzuela of Luisa Fernanda with Plácido Domingo, and in Ifigenie en Aulide and Fidelio under the baton of Riccardo Muti.

He has taken the role of Malcolm in Macbeth by Giuseppe Verdi (under the direction of Sir Charles Mackerras) at the Edinburgh Festival, at the Teatro Maestranza in Seville, at the Teatro della Scala in Milan and the Opera Bastille in Paris.

He has played Alfredo Germont (La Traviata) and Don Ottavio (Don Giovanni).

He performed at the new Auditorium of the Academy of Santa Cecilia in Rome (directed by Myung-whun Chung), at the Teatro San Carlo in Naples (directed by Gary Bertini), and the opening Scaligera 2007/08 (directed by Daniel Barenboim). He also performed the role of the Junge Seemann in "Tristan and Isolde" by Richard Wagner.

Nigro also took part in the prestigious Festival of Schubert in Schwarzenberg (Austria), at the Théâtre des Champs-Élysées in Paris, and at the Vilnius Opera Festival. He has sung at the Toronto Opera Festival, in Saint Petersburg (Russia), Tokyo, Kyoto, Madrid and others.

Alfredo Nigro lives in Germering (Bavaria, Germany) with his wife Violeta Urmana, the well-known Lithuanian Mezzosoprano and Soprano.

== Repertory ==
- Mozart - Don Giovanni (Don Ottavio)
- Mozart - La Clemenza di Tito (Tito)
- H. Berlioz - Les Troyens ( Iopas )
- G.Verdi - La Traviata (Alfredo)
- G.Verdi - Macbeth ( Macduff/Malcolm)
- G.Verdi - Falstaff (Fenton)
- G.Verdi - Otello (Cassio)
- G.Verdi - Nabucco (Ismaele)
- V. Bellini - La Sonnambula (Elvino)
- V.Bellini - I Capuleti e Montecchi (Tebaldo)
- G. Donizetti - Roberto Devereux (Roberto)
- G.Donizetti - Lucia di Lammermoor ( Edgardo/Arturo)
- G.Donizetti - L’Elisir d’amore ( Nemorino)
- R.Wagner - Tristan und Isolde (Junge SeeMann, Melot, The Hirt)
- Mozart - Requiem
- G.Verdi - Requiem
- G.Verdi - Tantum Ergo
- G.Rossini - Petite Messe Solennelle
- F.Mendelssohn-Simphonie n.2 (Lobgesang)

== Filmography ==
- Samson et Dalila, (2002)
- Iphigénie en Aulide, (2002)
- Tristan und Isolde, (2007)
- Macbeth, (2009)
- Puccini Ritrovato, cd/DG ( 2009 )
