= Marijampolė University of Applied Sciences =

Institution of higher education in Marijampolė, Lithuania

- Marijampolės kolegija
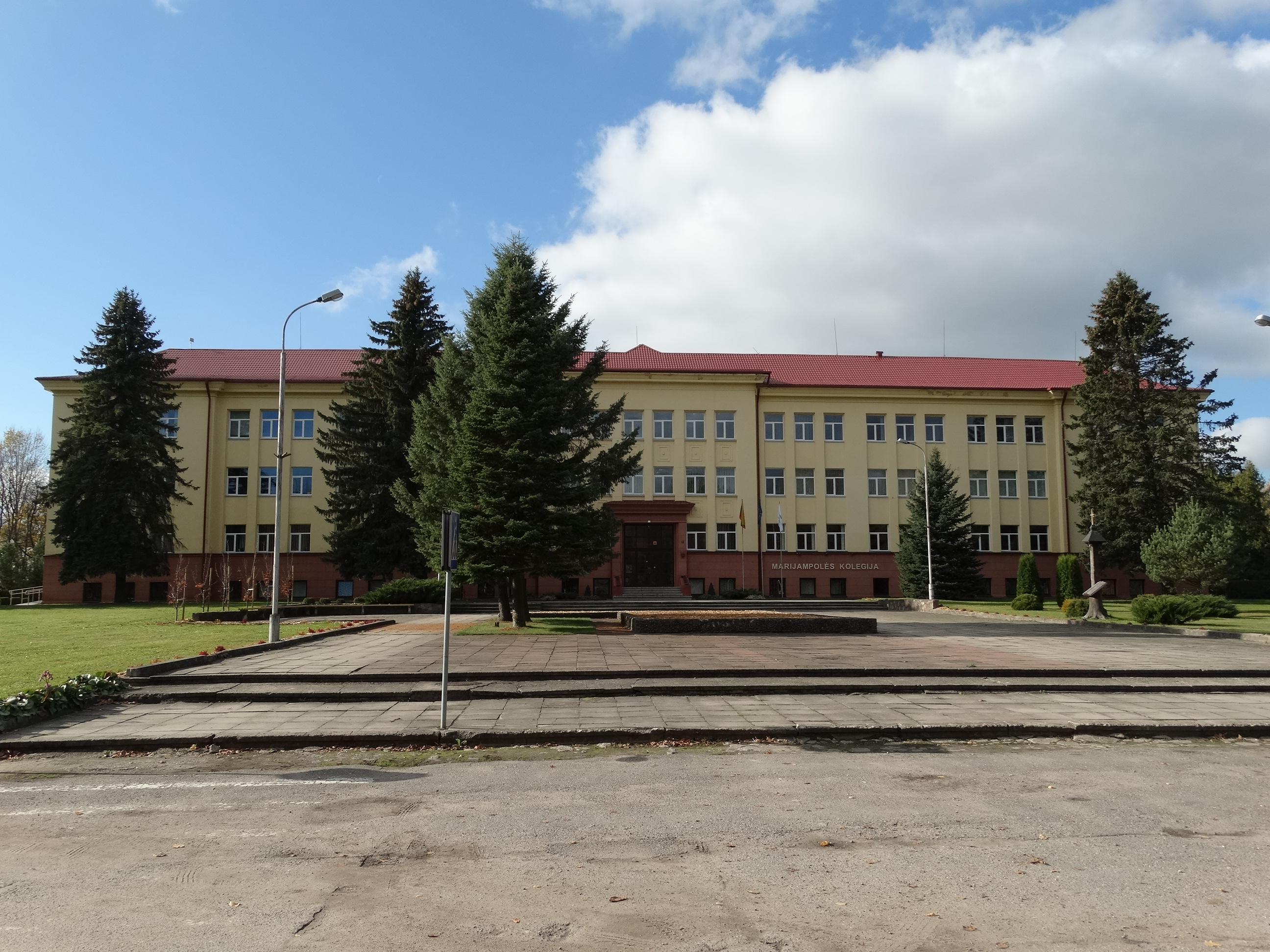
- Type: public
- Established: 2001; 25 years ago
- Chairman: Klemencas Agentas
- Director: Alė Murauskienė
- Academic staff: 113
- Students: ~600
- Location: Marijampolė, Marijampolė Municipality, Lithuania; 54°31′58″N 23°21′02″E
- Campus: urban
- Colors: Green Blue; Orange
- Website: www.marko.lt

Marijampolė University of Applied Sciences (Lithuanian: Marijampolės kolegija, MARKO) is an institution of higher education located in Marijampolė, Lithuania. It was established in 2001 after merger of Marijampole Pedagogical High School, and Marijampole Agricultural High School. The university offers 9 undergraduate and 2 post-graduate courses.

On 21 February 2024 The Government of Lithuania has approved the reorganisation of Marijampolė University of Applied Sciences by merger into Mykolas Romeris University (MRU). It will be reorganised as of 1 October 2024 with the establishment of a new faculty of Mykolas Romeris University - Sudovia Academy - operating as a branch in Marijampolė.

== About ==
Marijampole University of Applied Sciences is the only higher education institution in Sudovia region. Currently the University of Applied Sciences consists of 2 faculties. The Faculty of Education Studies and Social Work has two departments – Law, Management and Communication as well as Pedagogy, Arts and Social Work. The Faculty of Business and Technology consists of Departments of Technology as well as Business and Economics. University is located on the territory of the former Kvietiškis Manor (founded in 1717).

== History ==
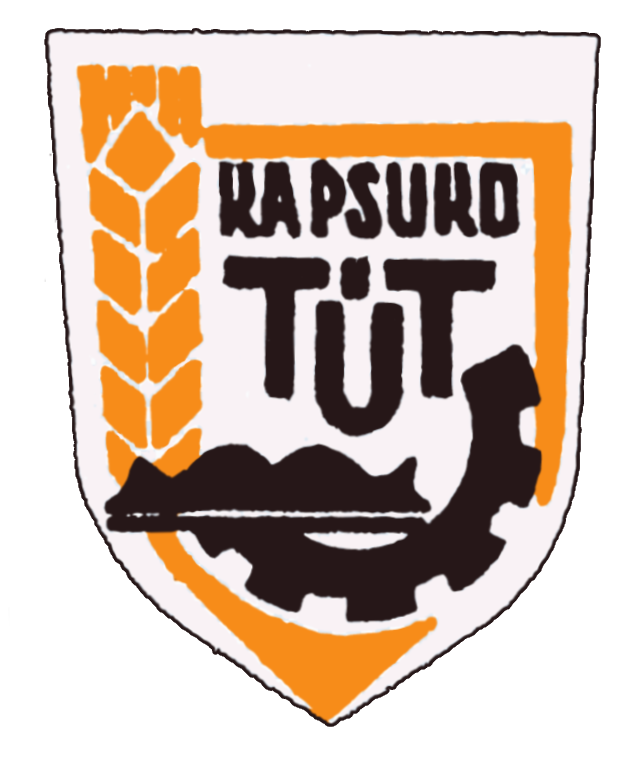
Logo of Marijampolė (then Kapsukas) Higher School of Agriculture during socialist era.

Marijampolė College was established in 2001 after the merger of Marijampolė Higher School of Pedagogy and Marijampolė Higher School of Agriculture.

The Faculty of Education and Social Work of Marijampolė College dates back to 1919, when Marijampolė Teachers' Seminary was established. In 1952 it was renamed the Pedagogical School, following the example of the Soviet schools. In 1959, in addition to primary school teachers, pre-school teachers were also trained.

In 1966-1968 the school was extended, extensions and dormitories were built. At that time, there were about 800 students and 80-85 lecturers. In 1983, a branch of the school was opened in Kaunas, where pre-school teachers began to be trained.

In 1986, the Marijampolė School of Culture was merged with the Pedagogical School, turning it into a music department. Choir directors, Folklore band directors, directors of drama groups and later music teachers were trained. The number of students at the school grew to 1,500, and the number of lecturers to 200.

In 1991, the school was reorganised into a higher school of pedagogy, and the training of teachers in new specialities began. On 1 September 2001, the school was reorganised into a faculty of a newly established college.

The Faculty of Education and Social Work of Marijampolė College of Education and Social Work dates back to 1926, when the Kvietiškis Lower Agricultural School was established. It owned 64 hectares of land, the central building of the manor, residential and farm buildings. In the first year of school, 30-35 students, mostly children of medium-sized farmers, completed 4 grades. Each year, 20-45 students graduated from the school. In 1932, the first scientific animal husbandry institution in Lithuania, the Bacon Research Station, was established in Kvietiškis. During the years after World War II School of Agriculture was renamed frequently:

- 1945 - Kvietiškis Agricultural School;
- 1946 - Marijampolė Animal Husbandry Technical School;
- 1955 - Kapsukas Animal Husbandry Technical School;
- 1962 - Kapsukas Agricultural Technical School;
- 1969 - Kapsukas Soviet Farming Technical School;
- 1986 - Kapsukas Agribusiness Soviet Farming Technical School;
- 1989 - Marijampolė Soviet Farming Technical School;
- 1990 - Marijampolė Higher Agricultural School.

== Study programs ==
MUAS offers 9 full-time study programs, partial studies through exchange programs, as well as informal study courses and training. Program duration is 3 years (6 semesters) and students receive a professional bachelor's degree upon graduation.

- Business English and Communication
- Social work
- International Business Management
- Transport logistics
- Information Technology Systems and Cybersecurity
- Sustainable Business Management
- Accounting and Finance
- Childhood Pedagogy
- Law and Public Procurement
