= Kazlų Rūda Eldership =

Eldership of Lithuania

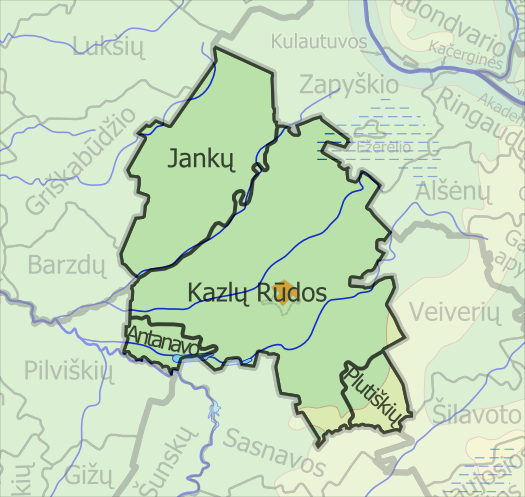
Elderships of Kazlų Rūda Municipality

The Kazlų Rūda Eldership (Lithuanian: Kazlų Rūdos seniūnija) is an eldership of Lithuania, located in the Kazlų Rūda Municipality. In 2021 its population was 3282.
