= Violeta Urmana =

Lithuanian opera singer (born 1961)

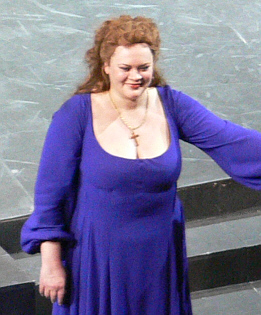
- Urmana in 2008
- Born: Violeta Urmanavičiūtė; 19 August 1961 (age 64); Kazlų Rūda, Lithuania
- Occupation: opera singer
- Years active: 1993–present
- Spouse: Alfredo Nigro

Violeta Urmanavičiūtė-Urmana (born 19 August 1961) is a Lithuanian opera singer who has sung leading mezzo-soprano and soprano roles in the opera houses of Europe and North America.

== Life and career ==
Urmana was born in Kazlų Rūda, a small town in Lithuania's Marijampolė County. She studied piano and singing at the Lithuania Academy of Music and Theater in Vilnius and continued her vocal studies in Munich at Hochschule für Musik und Theater München with Josef Loibl. Between 1991 and 1993, she was a member the Bavarian State Opera's Opera Studio program for young singers where she studied under Astrid Varnay and would begin her stage career at the opera house.

Urmana originally sang mezzo-soprano roles but from 2001 began singing dramatic soprano roles. She sang Madeleine di Coigny in Andrea Chénier at the Vienna State Opera in 2003, Isolde in Tristan und Isolde in Rome in 2004 and Leonora in La forza del destino in London that same year.

She is married to the Italian opera singer, Alfredo Nigro. The couple met when she was singing the title role in Gluck's Iphigénie en Aulide at La Scala in 2002.

== Roles ==
Roles sung by Urmana in the course of her career include:

- Medea in Medea
- Waldtaube/Tove in Gurre-Lieder
- Aida/Amneris in Aida
- Azucena in Il trovatore
- Amelia in Ein Maskenball
- Ariadne in Ariadne auf Naxos
- Brünnhilde in Siegfried
- Elisabetta/Eboli in Don Carlos
- Isolde/Brangäne in Tristan und Isolde
- Judith in Herzog Blaubarts Burg
- Ortrud in Lohengrin
- Kundry in Parsifal
- Lady Macbeth in Macbeth
- Norma/Adalgisa in Norma
- Sieglinde, Fricka, Brünnhilde in Die Walküre
- Tosca in Tosca
- Wally in La Wally
- La Gioconda in La Gioconda
- Santuzza in Cavalleria rusticana
- Venus in Tannhäuser
- Waltraute, Brünnhilde in Götterdämmerung
- Soprano/mezzo-soprano in Requiem by Verdi

== Awards (selection) ==
- 2001 Woman of the Year (Lithuania)
- 2001 Female Singer of the Year (Lithuania)
- 2001 National Prize of the Republic of Lithuania for the Arts (Lithuania)
- 2002 Franco Abbiati Prize Premio Franco Abbiati della Critica Musicale Italiana, Italy
- 2002 L'Opera Award Italy
- 2002 Royal Philharmonic Society Music Award (Great Britain)
- 2007 Honorary citizenship of Violeta Urmana's home town Marijampole (Lithuania)
- 2007 LT-Tapatybe Award in the arts category for the reputation of Lithuania abroad (Lithuania)
- 2007 World Intellectual Property Organization Creativity Award
- 2009 Austrian title of Kammersängerin
- 2011 Highest Honour bestowed by the Lithuanian Ministry of Culture
- 2011 "Shine Your Light and Hope Award" by Carson J. Spencer Foundation (Denver, USA)
- 2012 Granting of the title of honorary doctor at the Lithuanian Academy of Music and Theatre
- 2014 Commendatore dell'Ordine della Stella d'Italia
- 2016 Designated as a UNESCO Artist for Peace

== Discography (selection) ==
- Das Lied von der Erde, Rückert-Lieder (Gustav Mahler): Deutsche Grammophon
- Best of Wiener Philharmoniker Vol. VII: Deutsche Grammophon
- Andrea Chénier: Decca
- Messa da Requiem Soprano: Naxos
- Messa da Requiem Mezzo-soprano : EMI
- Violeta Urmana singt Lieder von List, Strauss, Berg: FARAO
- La Gioconda: EMI
- Oberto: Philips
- Tristan und Isolde: EMI
- Puccini ritrovato (famous arias und ensembles by Puccini): Deutsche Grammophon

== DVDs (selection) ==
- Aida – Metropolitan Opera, New York: Decca
- Macbeth: Bel Air Classiques
- La canzone dei ricordi (Giuseppe Martucci) medici arts
- Aida – Teatro alla Scala, Milan (Italy) Decca
- La forza del destino – Maggio Musicale Fiorentino Arthaus – Rai Trade
- Cavalleria rusticana Opus Arte
- Un ballo in maschera – Teatro Real Opus Arte
- Don Carlos Opus Arte
- Le rossignol EMI
- Parsifal Arthaus
