= Jankai Eldership =

Eldership of Lithuania

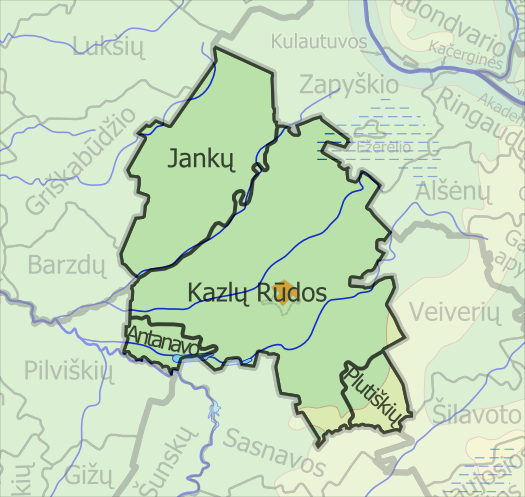
Elderships of Kazlų Rūda Municipality

The Jankai Eldership (Lithuanian: Jankų seniūnija) is an eldership of Lithuania, located in the Kazlų Rūda Municipality. In 2021 its population was 904.
