= Plutiškės Eldership =

Eldership of Lithuania

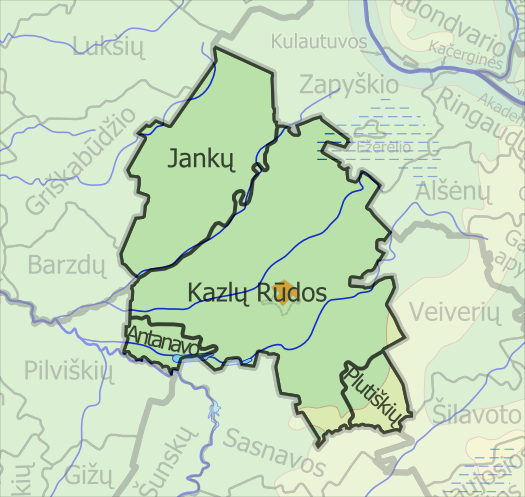
Elderships of Kazlų Rūda Municipality

The Plutiškės Eldership (Lithuanian: Plutiškių seniūnija) is an eldership of Lithuania, located in the Kazlų Rūda Municipality. Its center is the village of Plutiškės. In 2021 its population was 585.
