= Antanavas Eldership =

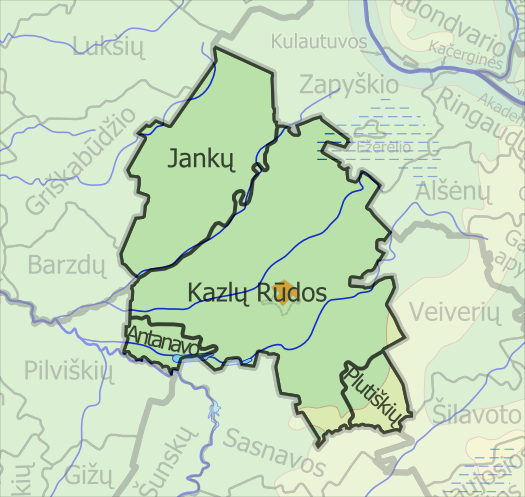
Elderships of Kazlų Rūda Municipality

The Antanavas Eldership (Lithuanian: Antanavo seniūnija) is an eldership of Lithuania, located in the Kazlų Rūda Municipality. In 2021 its population was 693.
