= Kazlų Rūda Municipality =

Coordinates: 54°45′50″N 23°27′50″E

Kazlų Rūda Municipality Kazlų Rūdos savivaldybė
- Municipality
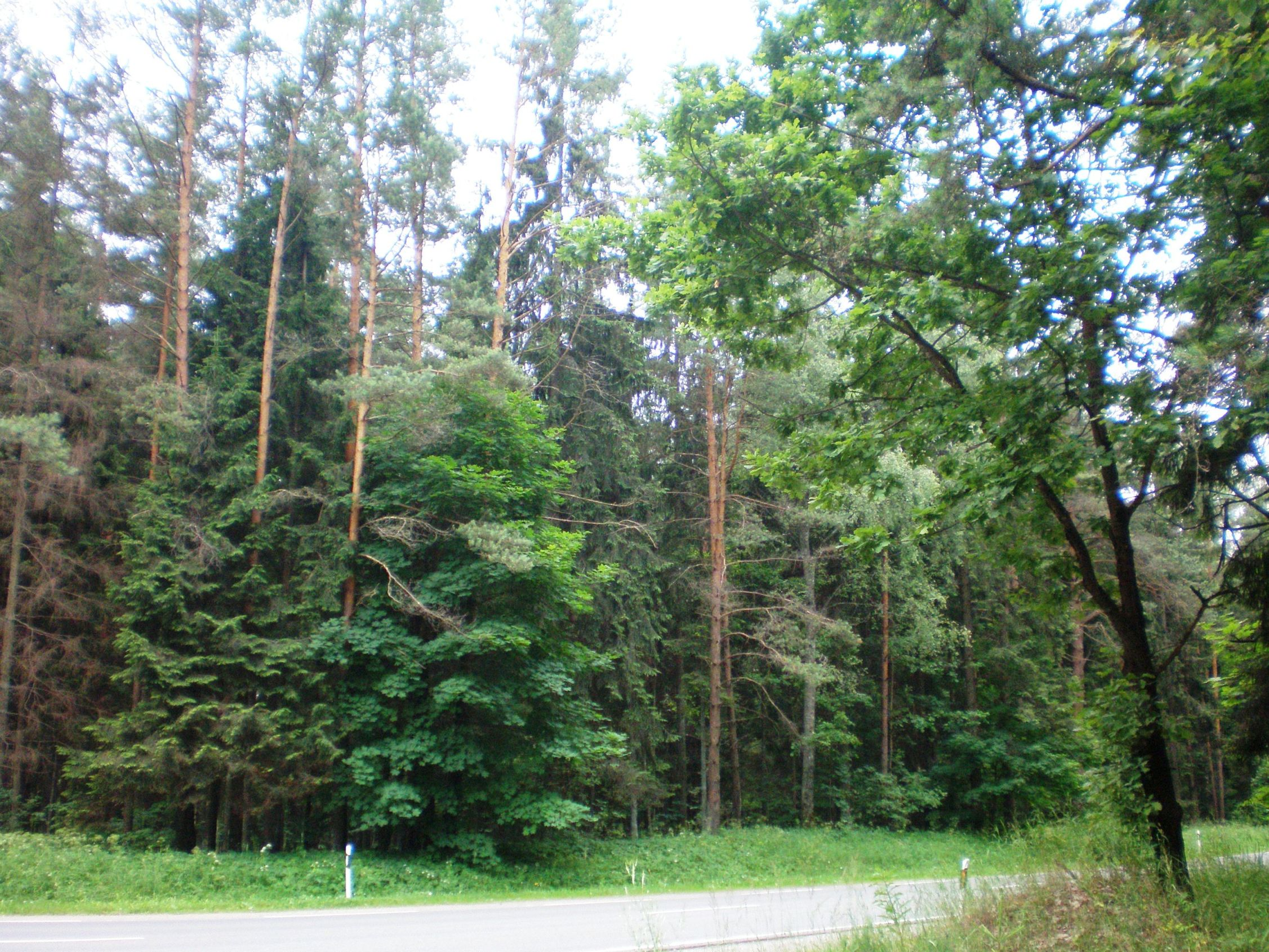
- Kazlų Rūda forests

- Coat of arms

- Location of Kazlų Rūda municipality within Lithuania

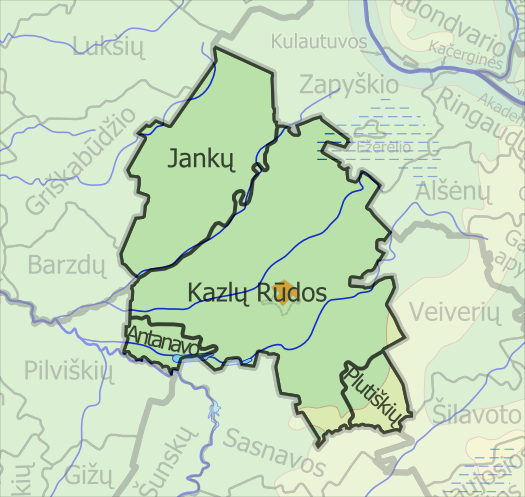
- Map of Kazlų Rūda municipality
- Country: Lithuania
- Ethnographic region: Suvalkija
- County: Marijampolė County
- Capital: Kazlų Rūda
- Elderships: 4

Area
  - Total: 555 km^{2} (214 sq mi)
  - Rank: 46th

Population (2021)
  - Total: 11,054
  - Rank: 55th
  - Density: 19.9/km^{2} (51.6/sq mi)
  - Rank: 38th
- Time zone: UTC+2 (EET)
  - Summer (DST): UTC+3 (EEST)
- Telephone code: 343
- Major settlements: Kazlų Rūda (pop. 5,666)
- Website: www.kazluruda.lt

Kazlų Rūda Municipality is one of 60 municipalities in Lithuania.

== Elderships ==
Kazlų Rūda Municipality is divided into 4 elderships:

Eldership (Administrative Center)	Area	Population (2021)
Antanavas Eldership (Antanavas)	19 km^{2} (4,695.00 acres; 7.34 sq mi)	693
Jankai Eldership (Jankai)	169 km^{2} (41,760.81 acres; 65.25 sq mi)	904
Kazlų Rūda Eldership (Kazlų Rūda)	360 km^{2} (88,957.94 acres; 139.00 sq mi)	3,282
Plutiškės Eldership (Plutiškės)	30 km^{2} (7,413.16 acres; 11.58 sq mi)	585
