= Verknė =

Stream in Lithuania

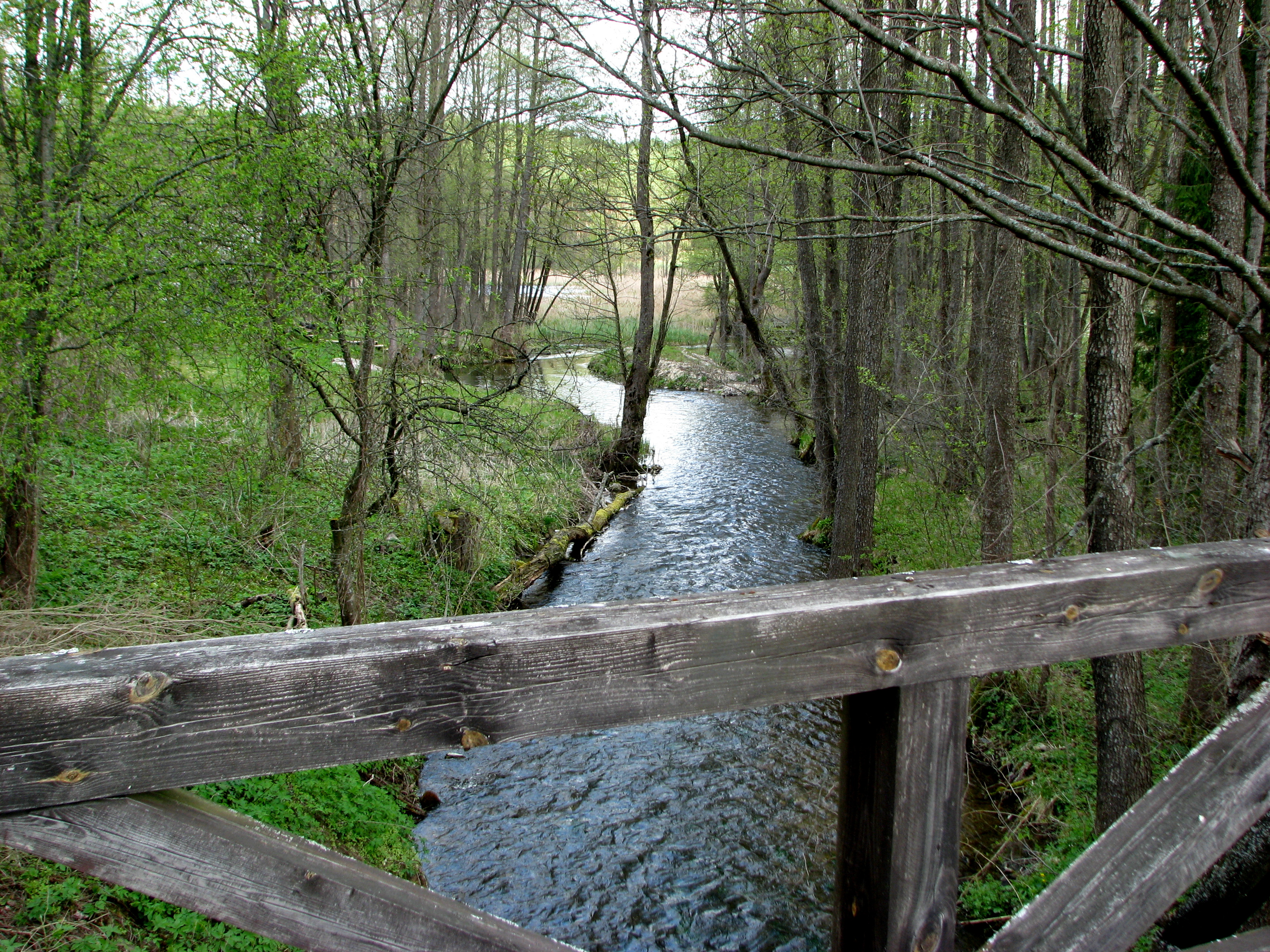
- Verknė near Derionys

Location
- Country: Lithuania

Physical characteristics
- Source
  - location: Near Rūdiškės
- Mouth: Neman
  - coordinates: 54°36′41″N 24°4′7″E
- Length: 77 km (48 mi)
- Basin size: 703 km^{2} (271 sq mi)
- Discharge
  - average: 5.55 m^{3}/s (196 cu ft/s)

Basin features
- Progression: Neman→ Baltic Sea

The Verknė (known as Galaverknė in the upper reaches; Polish: Wierzchnia) is a 77-kilometre (48 mi) stream in Lithuania. It is a right tributary of the river Neman (Nemunas); their confluence is 3 km (1.9 mi) north of Birštonas.

Its spring is near Rūdiškės in the Trakai District Municipality where it is known as the Galaverknė and passes a chain of smaller lakes. Having left the Vilkokšnis lake, the stream is known as the Verknė. Aukštadvaris with a population of 977 (2011) is the only relatively large settlement along the river. The Verknė passes the Prienai District Municipality and forms the border of the Birštonas Municipality near its mouth.

In 1960, the Verknė was impounded to create two reservoirs with hydroelectric power stations. The larger of the two is Aukštadvaris Reservoir (2.93 km^{2} (1.13 sq mi); the smaller one being Jundeliškės Reservoir.

== Tourism ==
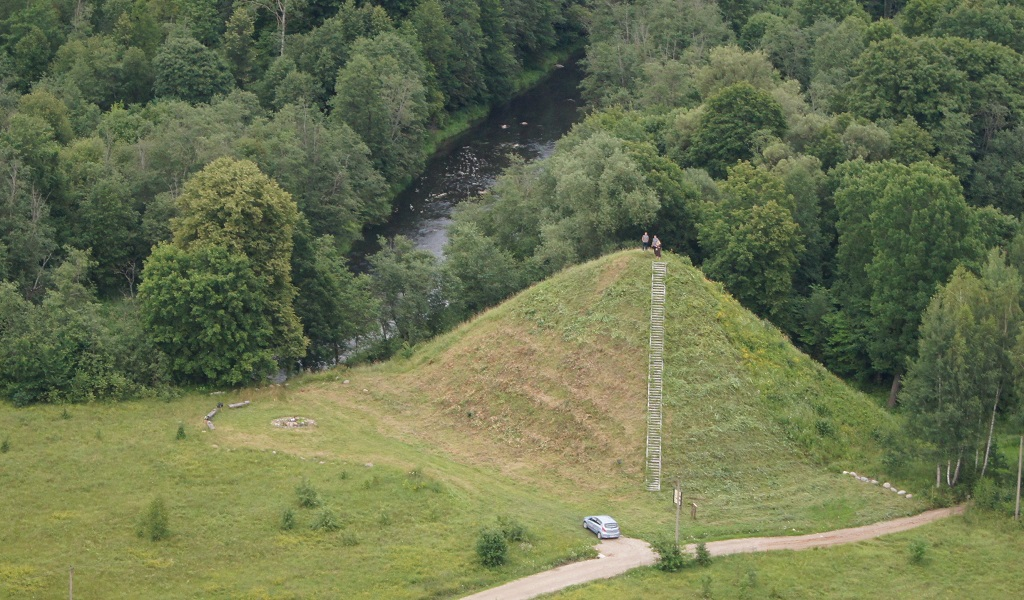
Paverkniai hill fort and the Verknė

The Verknė is one of the cleanest streams in Lithuania and 59.4 km (36.9 mi) is popular with kayakers and good for beginners. The first tour was made and described by the hydrologist Steponas Kolupaila.

The stream is part of two regional parks with several protected areas: Aukštadvaris Regional Park (153.5 km^{2} or 59.3 sq mi) and Nemunas Loops Regional Park (240.8 km^{2} or 93.0 sq mi). The parks were established in 1992.

A series of 12 hillforts (piliakalnis) is located near the Verknė. Most of these forts were built or expanded between the 10th and 14th centuries.

In Žydkaimis near the Vilkokšnis lake, a Jewish community was active in agriculture since the mid-19th century, even though this was banned in the Russian Empire. The community was supported in the 1930s by ORT. In 1936, the Jews owned 63% of the land in the village, despite emigration.

== Basin ==
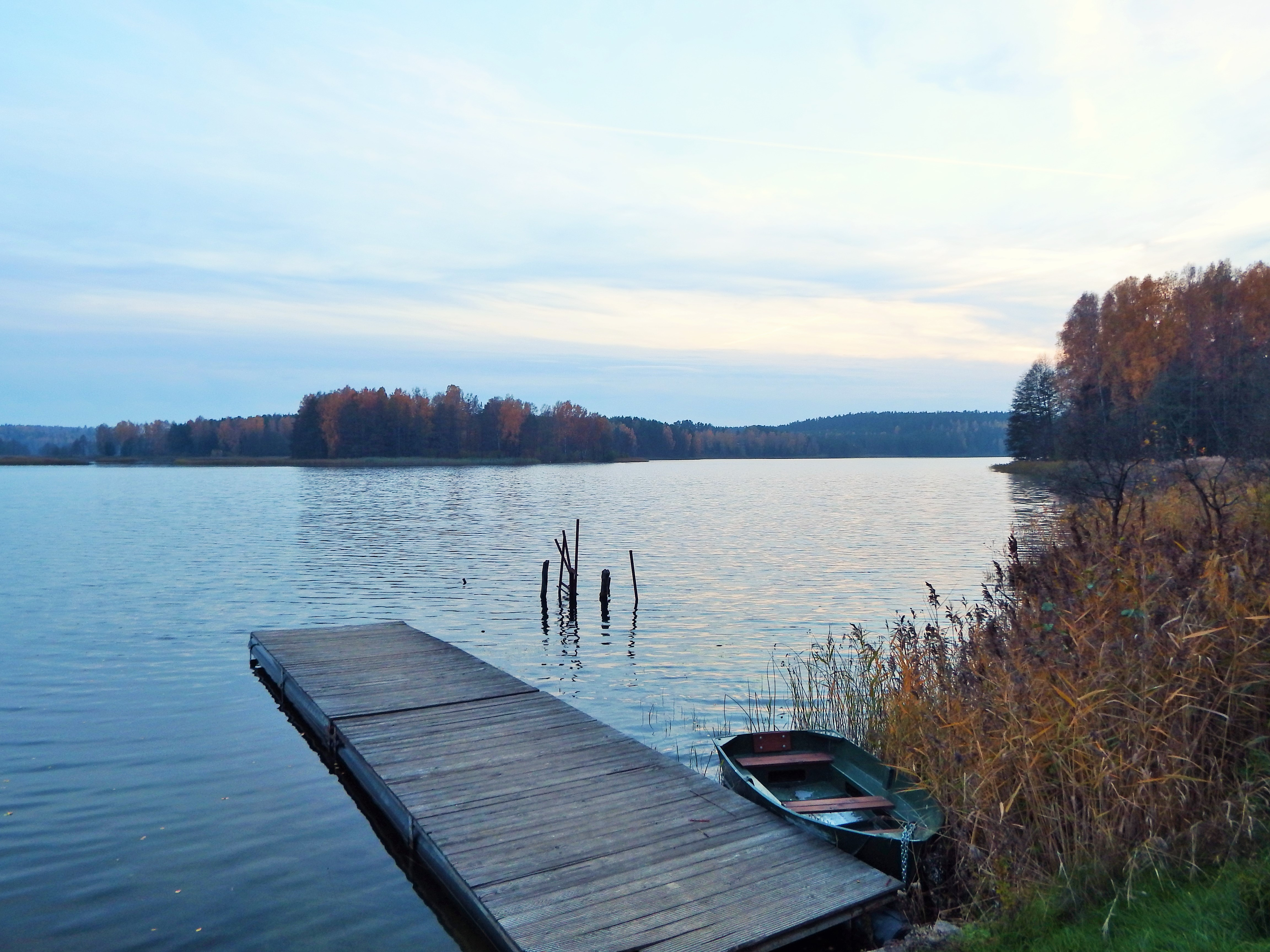
Aukštadvaris Reservoir (Nava lake)

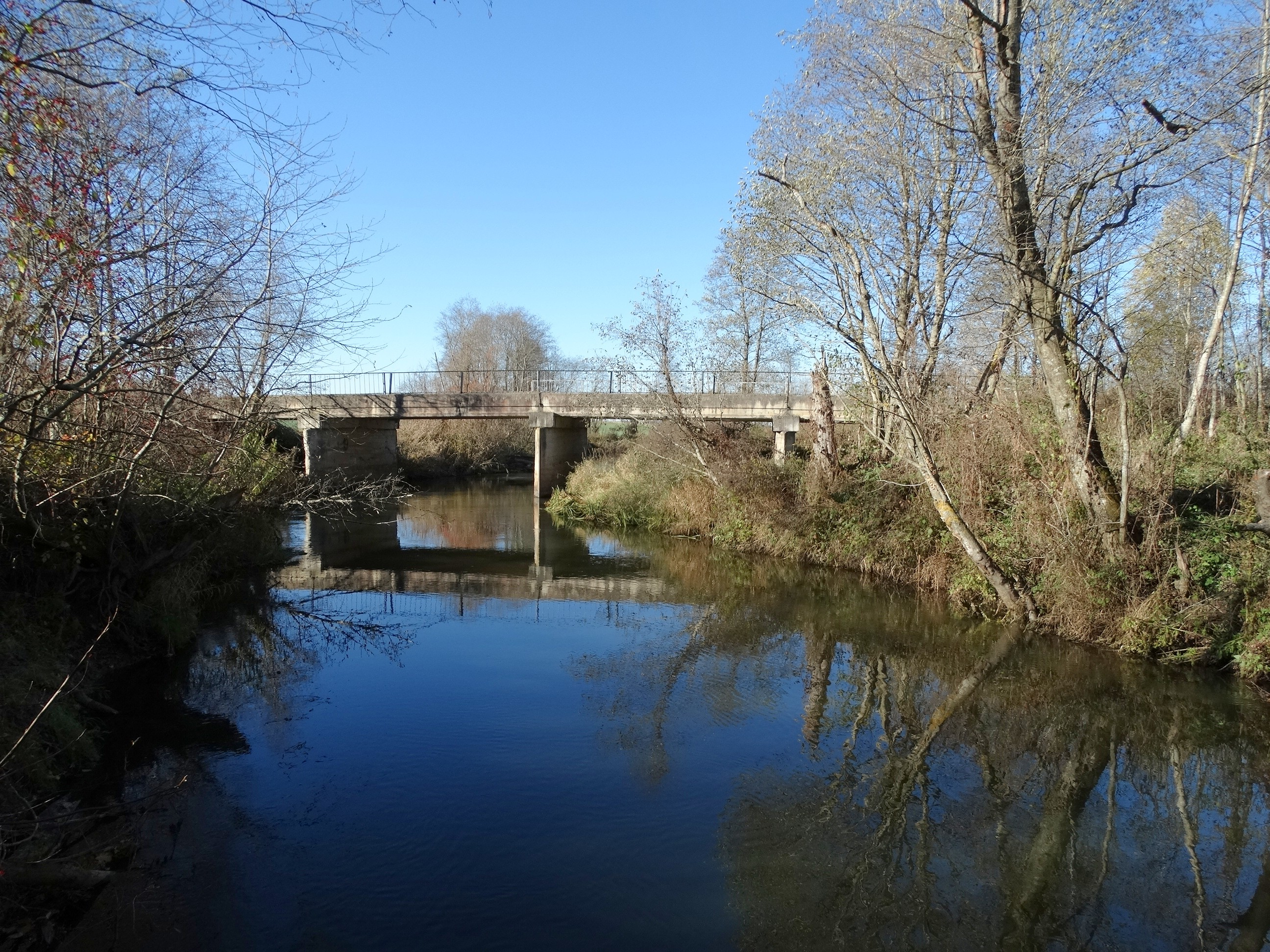
Verknė near Pakrovai (about 24 km (15 mi) from the mouth)

Total watershed is 703 km^{2} (271 sq mi). The average discharge is 5.55 m^{3}/s (196 cu ft/s) with a maximum of 116 m^{3}/s (4,100 cu ft/s). The main tributaries are Alšia and Obeltis.

=== Right tributaries ===
- Balina
- Lėlelė
- Guostė
- Alšia
- Svėdubė

=== Left tributaries ===
- Strūzda
- Samė
- Adinčiava
- Vapsa
- Obeltis
- Dindžiakė
