= Birštonas Eldership =

Eldership of Lithuania

The Birštonas Eldership (Lithuanian: Birštono seniūnija) is an eldership of Lithuania, located in the Birštonas Municipality. In 2021 its population was 1056.
