= Kaunas County =

County of Lithuania

Coordinates: 54°53′50″N 23°53′33″E

Kaunas County Kauno apskritis
- County
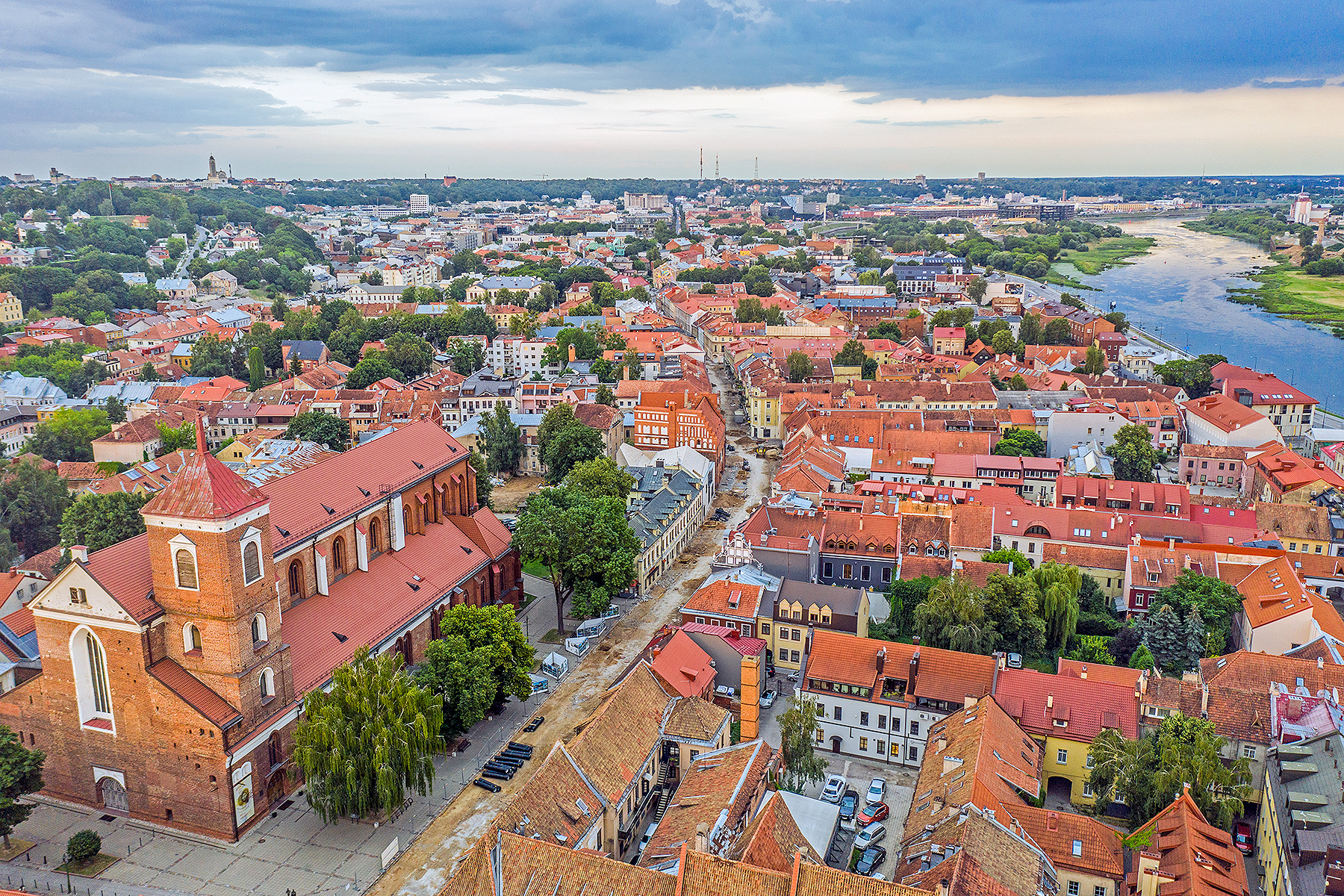
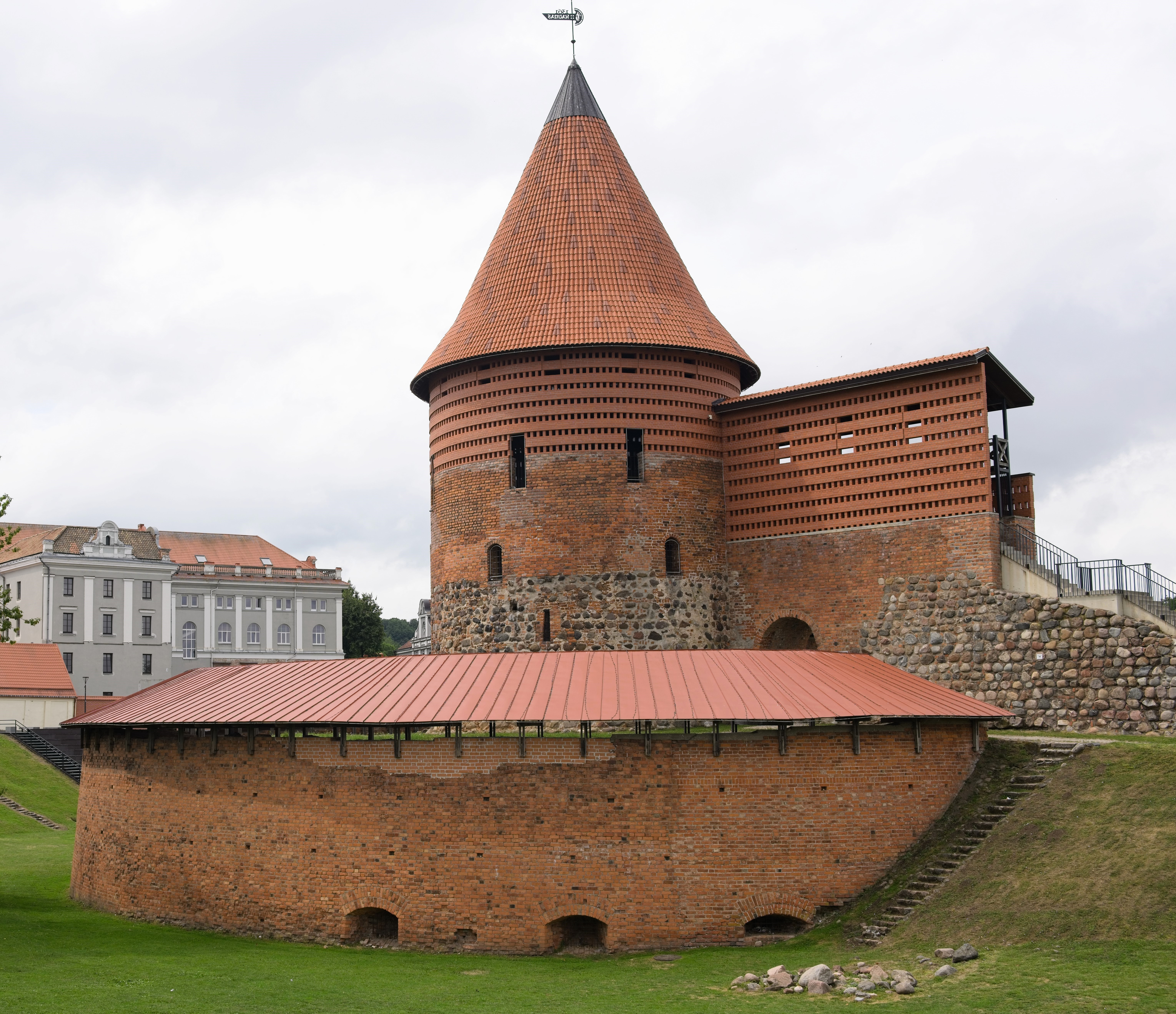
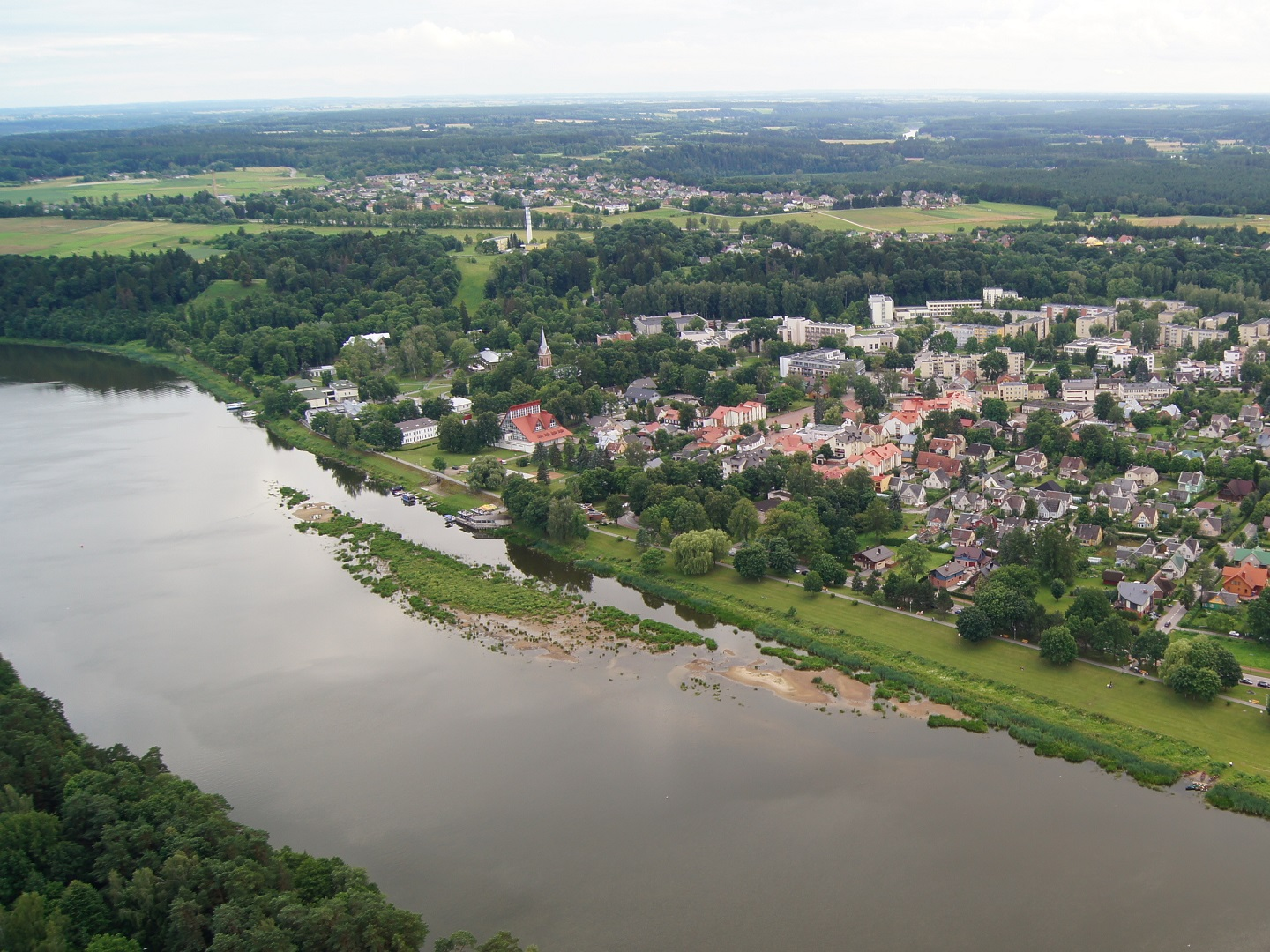
- From the top to bottom-right: Kaunas Old Town, Kaunas Castle, Birštonas spa town, Darius and Girėnas Stadium, Žalgiris Arena.

- Flag Coat of arms

- Location of Kaunas County
- Interactive map of Kaunas County
- Country: Lithuania
- Administrative centre: Kaunas
- Municipalities: List: Birštonas municipality; Jonava district municipality; Kaišiadorys district municipality; Kaunas city municipality; Kaunas district municipality; Kėdainiai district municipality; Prienai district municipality; Raseiniai district municipality

Area
  - Total: 8,086 km^{2} (3,122 sq mi)
- (12.4% of the area of Lithuania)

Population (2022)
  - Total: 623,262
  - Rank: 2nd of 10 (20.4% of the population of Lithuania)
  - Density: 77.08/km^{2} (199.6/sq mi)

GDP
  - Total: €14.7 billion (2023)
  - Per capita: €25,200 (2023)
- Time zone: UTC+2 (EET)
  - Summer (DST): UTC+3 (EEST)
- ISO 3166 code: LT-KU
- HDI (2023): 0.901 very high · 2nd

Kaunas County (Lithuanian: Kauno apskritis) is one of ten counties of Lithuania. It is in the centre of the country, and its capital is Kaunas. On 1 July 2010, the county administration was abolished.

== Symbols ==
The county's coat of arms can be blazoned as follows: Gules, an aurochs head caboshed argent ensigned by a cross Or between his horns enclosed by a bordure purpure charged with ten evenly distributed crosses of Lorraine Or.

The flag's heraldic blazon is identical, since the flag is a banner of the arms.

== Municipalities ==
The county is subdivided into municipalities:

Birštonas Municipality
Jonava District Municipality
Kaišiadorys District Municipality
Kaunas City Municipality
Kaunas District Municipality
Kėdainiai District Municipality
Prienai District Municipality
Raseiniai District Municipality
