= Aukštadvaris =

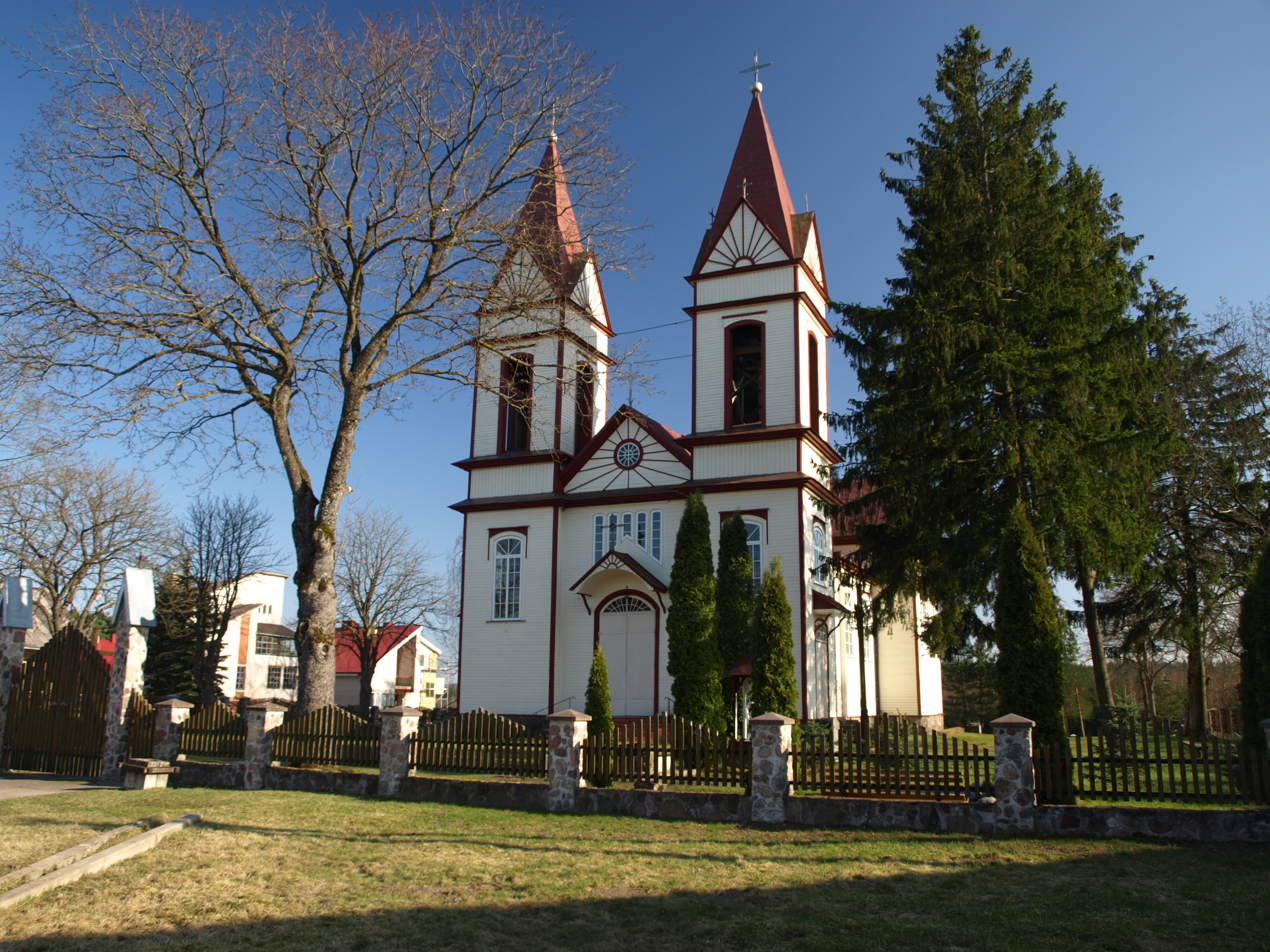

- Coat of arms

- Location in Lithuania
- Coordinates: 54°34′51.6″N 24°31′40.8″E
- Country: Lithuania
- County: Vilnius
- District: Trakai

Population (2011)
  - Total: 977

Aukštadvaris (Yiddish: Visoki-Dvor ,וויסאָקי-דוואָר) is a town in Trakai district municipality in Lithuania on the Verknė river. According to 2011 census, it had population of 977.

Aukštadvaris features Malewski Palace, built in 1837 by Antoni Malewski, which remained with the family until World War I (and housed a hospital after World War II). There is an old Adam Mickiewicz oak, under which the poet supposedly liked to sit.
