= Birštonas =

- town
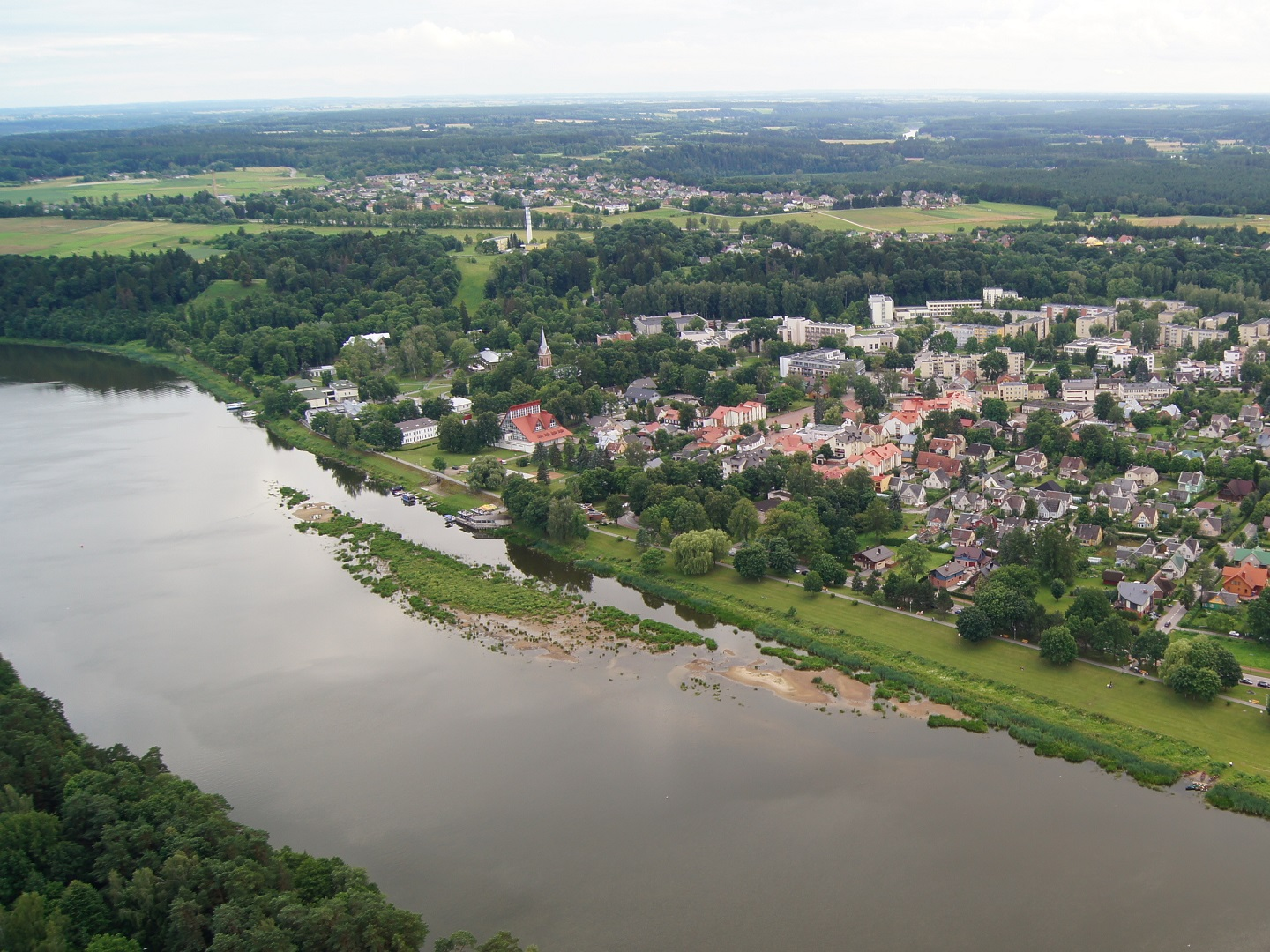
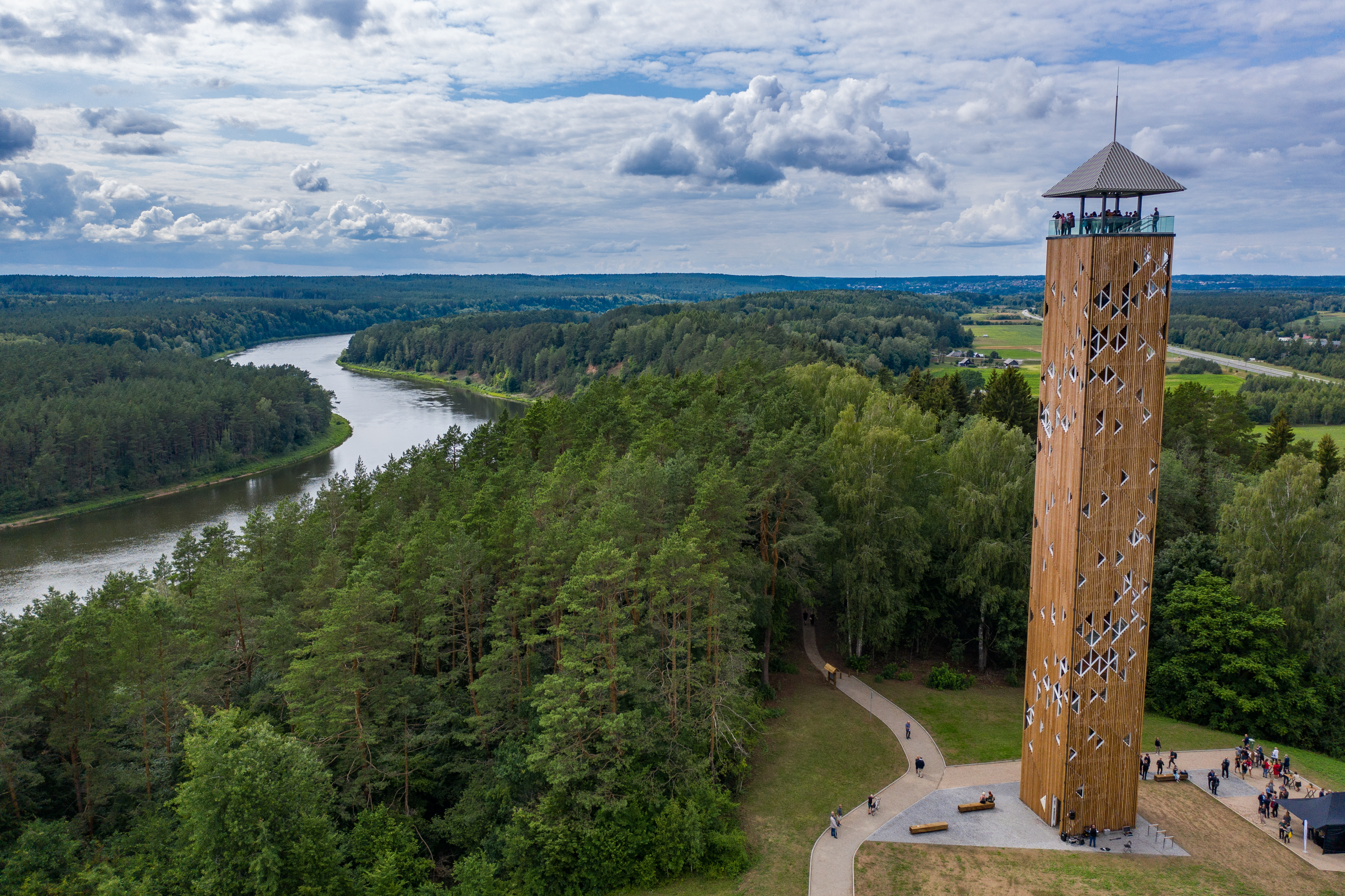
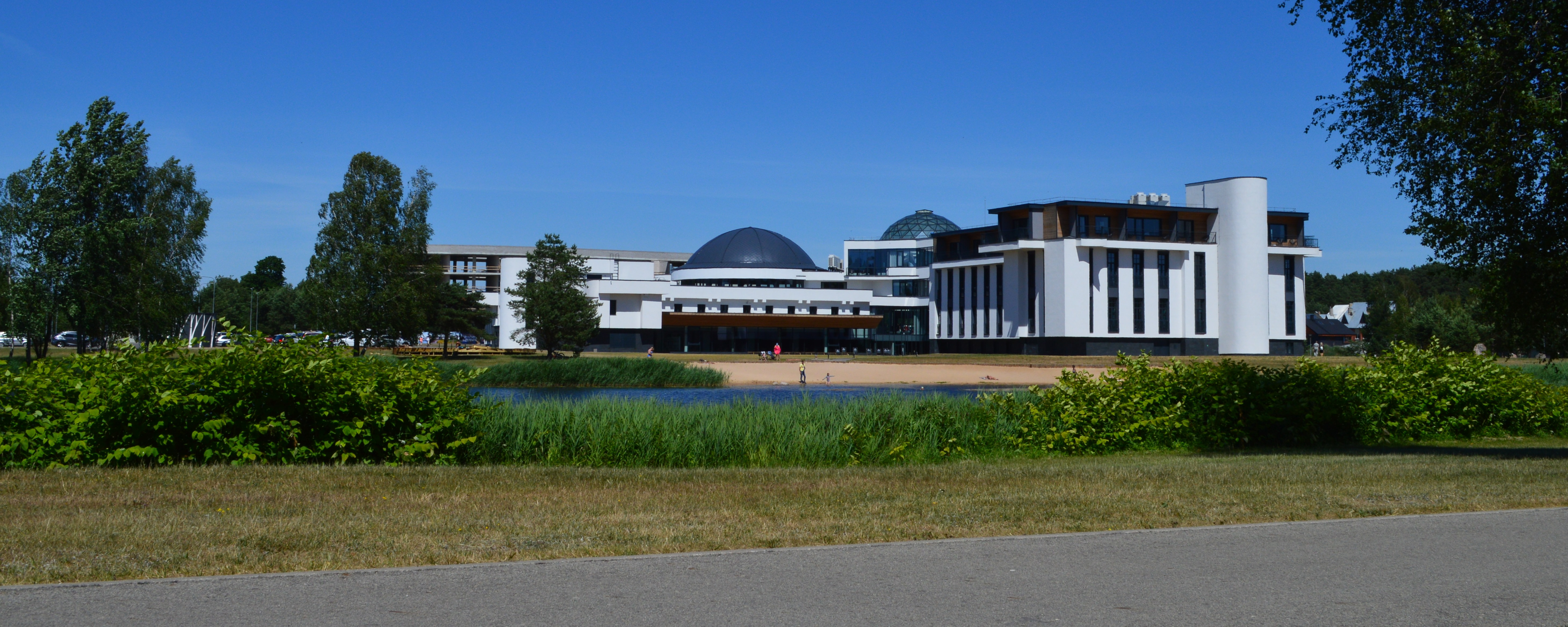
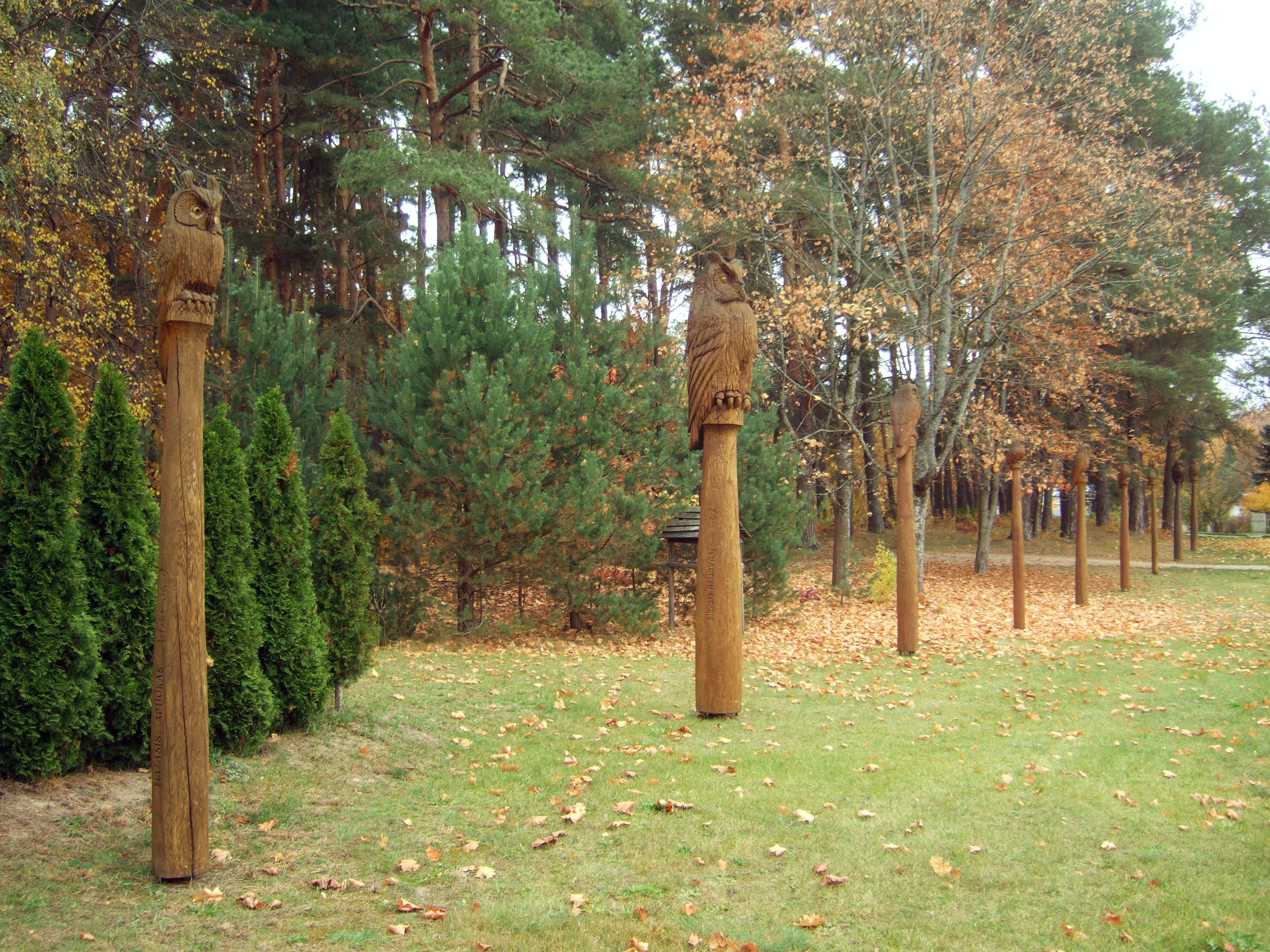
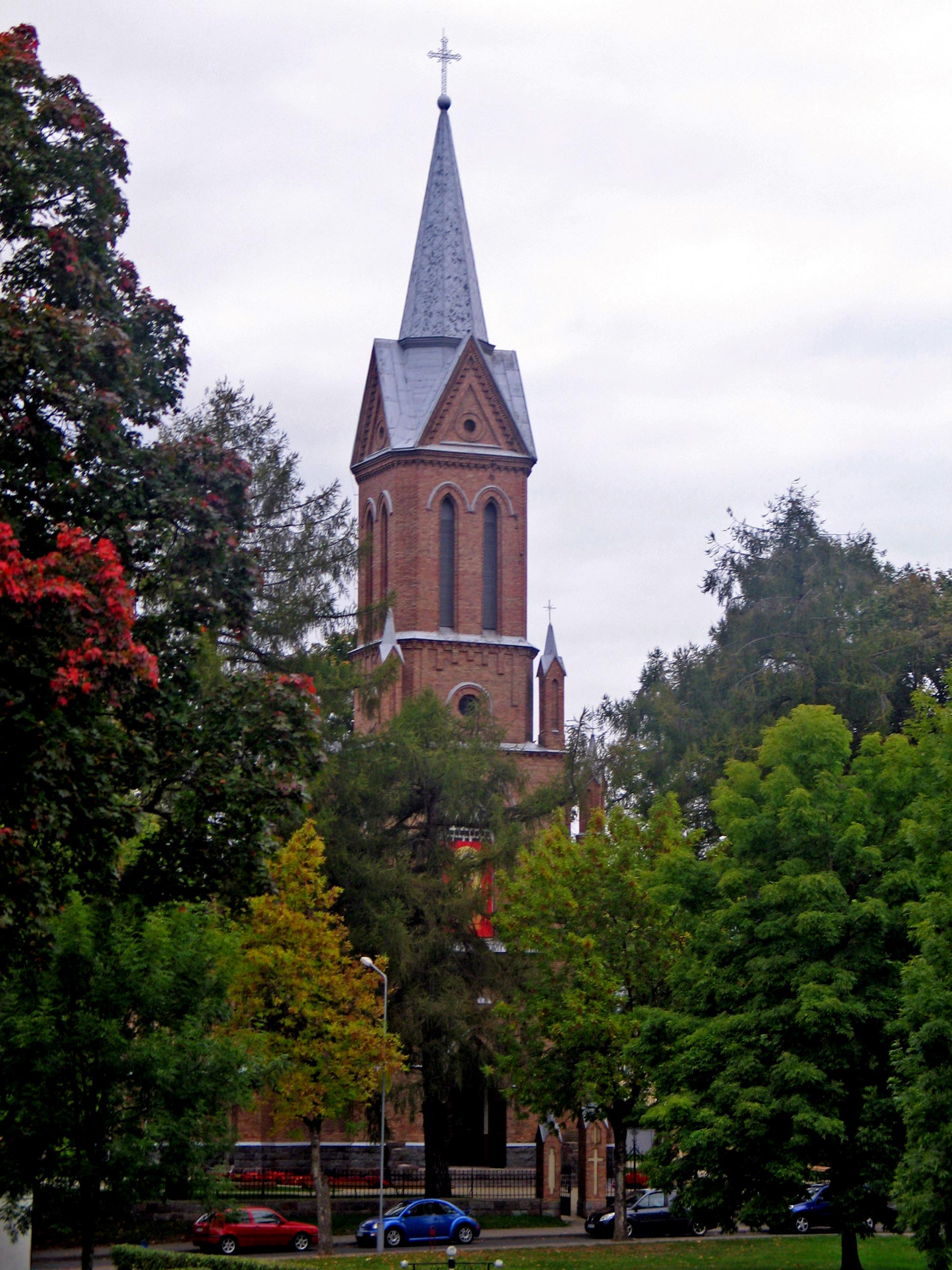
- Top to bottom: Aerial view of Birštonas, Birštonas observation tower, Vytautas Spa, Sculptures of all native Lithuanian owls in Birštonas Park, Birštonas Church

- Coat of arms

- Location of Birštonas
- Coordinates: 54°36′10″N 24°1′14.0″E
- Country: Lithuania
- Ethnographic region: Dzūkija
- County: Kaunas County
- Municipality: Birštonas municipality
- Capital of: Birštonas municipality
- First mentioned: 1382
- Granted town rights: 1529

Government
  - Mayor: Nijolė Dirginčienė

Area
  - Total: 13 km^{2} (5.0 sq mi)

Population (2023)
  - Total: 3,094
  - Density: 238/km^{2} (620/sq mi)
- Time zone: UTC+2 (EET)
  - Summer (DST): UTC+3 (EEST)

Birštonas is a balneological resort and a spa town in Lithuania situated 30 km (19 mi) south of Kaunas on the right bank of the Nemunas River.

Birštonas received its town rights 1529 and was appointed a town in 1966. The town is the administrative centre of the Birštonas municipality.

== Etymology ==
The origin of the name Birštonas is unclear. There are two main theories. The more likely theory is that the name comes from the surname Birštonas, making the town's name an eponym. Although this surname is not common, it is widespread mainly in Sudovia. Although there are not many place names in Lithuania based on the singular form of a surname, there are some ( e.g. Kavarskas, Musteika, Sudargas). The other theory is the addition of the suffix -onas to the word biržtva ("birch grove"), with the letter "ž" gradually softened to "š". Translations of the name in other languages include Polish: Birsztany, Russian: Бирштаны Birshtany, Yiddish: בירשטאן Birshtan.

== History ==
Birštonas was mentioned for the first time in the fourteenth century as a "homestead at salty water." It was mentioned in chronicles of the Teutonic Knights in 1382 and described as "a farmstead at the salty water". Many Grand Dukes of Lithuania, Lithuanian nobles, and other noblemen vacationed in Birštonas during 14th and 16th centuries to hunt. The resort was founded in 1846. Many people from Russian, Polish, and Lithuanian cities visited sanitoriums for the area's mineral water and to receive curative mud applications, including Lithuanian writer Balys Sruoga, who was ill after the Stutthof concentration camp, beatified Teofilius Matulionis, after his imprisonment in Soviet camps and prisons for 16 years.

== Environment ==
Birštonas is surrounded by pine forests and the Nemunas River. Birštonas serves as a center of the Nemunas Loops Regional Park.

== Transportation ==
Birštonas is accessed by national status roads from Kaunas, Vilnius, and Marijampolė. It is served by Kaunas International Airport, the second largest airport in Lithuania, located in Karmėlava site.

== Festivals ==
Birštonas holds several festivals. The Birštonas town festival is held during the second weekend of June. It features concerts, folk art exhibits, and air balloon and motorboat races.

On the last weekend of March Birštonas hosts a traditional, Lithuania's oldest international jazz festival, called Birštonas. Since 1980, the jazz festival coming here every two years have long earned the resort a name of the Lithuanian jazz Mecca.

The "Būtent!" festival is an annual open-air discussion festival that takes place at the beginning of September. For two days, well-known educators, influencers and politicians gather to discuss topics recommended by festival visitors. A wide variety of topics are discussed in English and Lithuanian. The festival is free of charge.

== Tourism ==
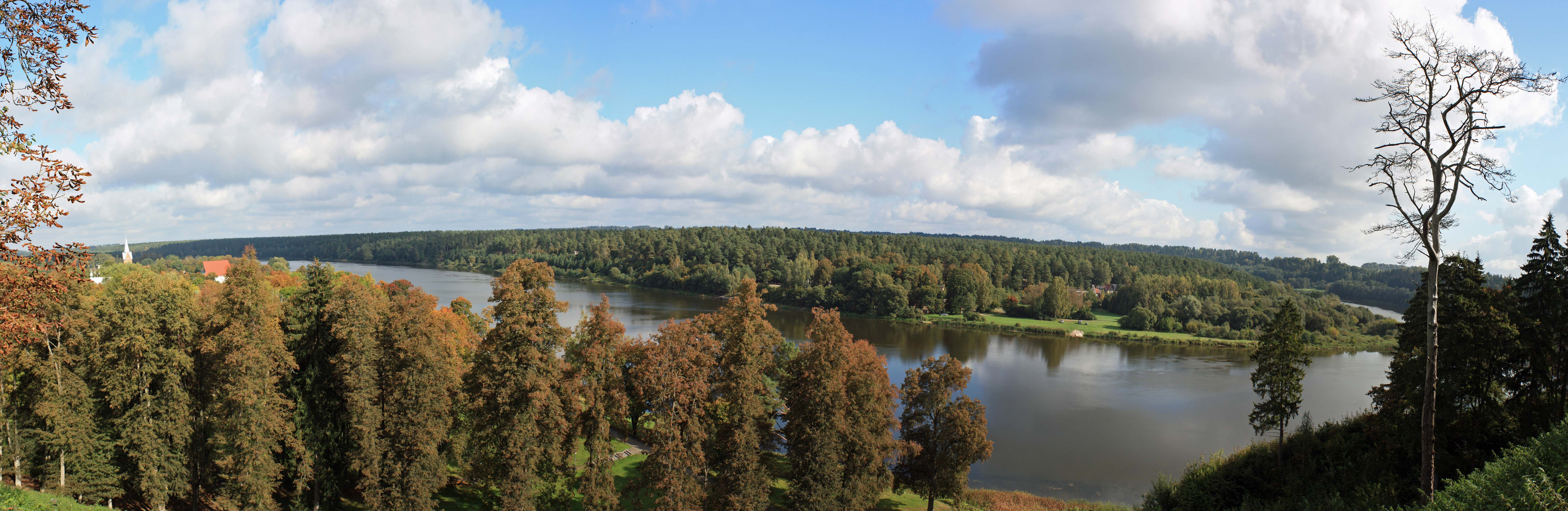
Panorama of the Nemunas river

Birštonas is the fastest growing resort town in Lithuania experiencing a 55% increase in tourism annually. Birštonas is known for its mineral water. This water is used by sanatoriums for mineral water pools and baths. There are three large sanatoriums in Birštonas:

- Tulpė (English: Tulip) can accommodate as many as 210 people at a time
- Versmė (English: Spring) has 187 rooms that can accommodate 340 people at a time
- Eglė (English: Spruce Tree) was opened in 2013 and can treat 730 people at one time

All of them offer halotherapy, therapeutic peat pulp bath, mineral water pools, baths, massages, and a wide range of curative procedures. Birštonas also has hotels and country farmsteads, adapted for rural tourism.

=== Local attractions ===
- Vytautas hill, where Lithuanian Grand Duke Vytautas had his hunting mansion. After you climb the 40 m high slope, visitors are able to pause for breath on a beautifully arranged rest site. The site opens a fascinating panoramic view upon Birštonas town and Nemunas bend. The view is beautiful throughout the year, so climbing Vytautas Hill has become a ritual for Birštonas guests. Furthermore, this place is a favourite of selfie makers and painters visiting the resort town.
- Birštonas Museum - The museum building, which is included in the list of Cultural Heritage, is worth seeing. This romantic villa, with little towers and ornate balconies, was built by the forester, Antanas Katelė. It was leased to teachers undergoing treatment in Birštonas before the Second World War. After the war, the building was nationalized. Then it was used as a sanatorium. In 1967 it was established as a museum.
- Birštonas Museum of Sacral Art - The former building of parsonage today accommodates the Museum of Sacral Art, which attracts more and more pilgrims and single visitors every year. Visitors to this place describe their stay here "as a place to find peace of mind and revive yourself" either for a splendid exhibit of artistic treasures or for the sincere attention paid to each visitor. Justinas Marcinkevičius, a legendary Lithuanian poet, declared that this museum is dedicated to love.
- The Promenade, a path near the Nemunas River.
- Cycling in local Žvėrinčius forest, riding a horse, sailing, sculling, or canoeing along the Verknė or the Nemunas rivers are available.
- Birštonas Observation Tower. The place for the tower was chosen back in 1997, when the Government of the Republic of Lithuania approved the planning scheme for the Nemunas Loops Regional Park. The observation deck of the tower will be located at a height of 45 m, and the total height of the tower will be 55 m. Getting to the tower top without stopping might be difficult, and therefore six rest sites will be provided. Next to the tower there will be a recreation area and information stand with panorama of the Nemunas Loops Regional Park. The metal construction of the tower will be "dressed" with larch panels with triangular cells. Such "dress" of the tower might remind of wayside shrine or constellations in the sky. The tower, rectangular design with a laced roof, follows the tradition of Lithuanian defensive architecture, resembles old wooden castle towers and also associates with the later architecture of belfries towers. One might also compare the tower with roadside chapels and image of the World tree. The symbolism of the tower enlivens with the openings – small window for light penetration and opportunity to admire the surrounding beauties as they are carvings of wooden sculptures.

== Notable people ==
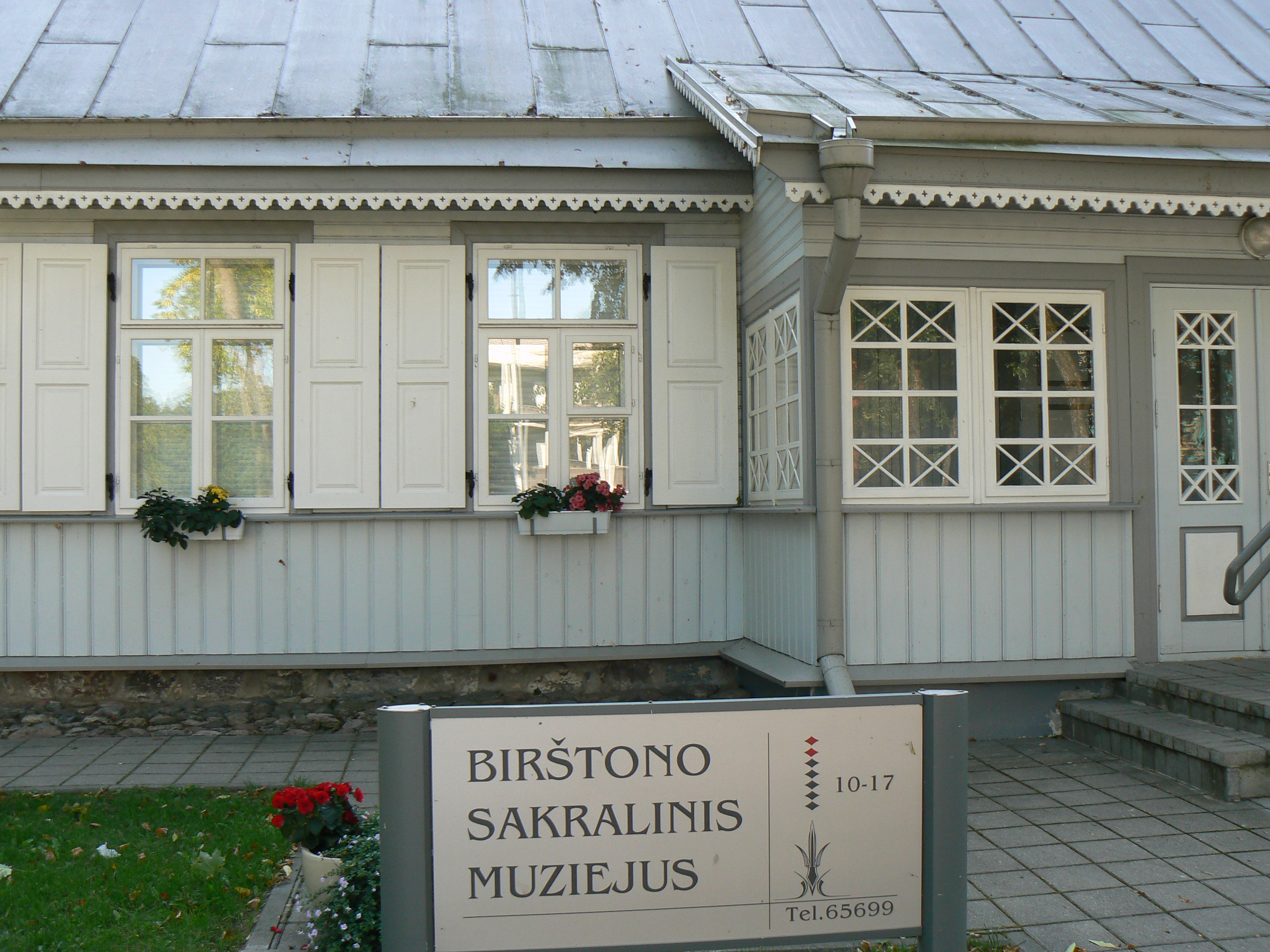
The exposition about beatified Teofilius Matulionis is in Museum of Sacral Art in Birštonas.

- Nikodemas Silvanavičius (1834–1919), a Russian painter and mosaicist, moved to and worked locally later in life
- Teofilius Matulionis (1873–1962), a Lithuanian prelate of the Roman Catholic Church kept under house arrest locally
- Balys Sruoga (1896–1947), a Lithuanian poet, playwright, critic and literary theorist.
- Vidas Blekaitis (born 1972), a Lithunanian strongman.
- Daugvinas Zujus (born 1975), a retired male racewalker, he competed in the men's 50 km race walk event at three consecutive Summer Olympics

== Twin towns — sister cities ==
Birštonas is twinned with:

- Ağstafa, Azerbaijan
- Bykle, Norway
- (Georgia (country)) Chiatura, Georgia
- Ełk County, Poland
- Jinan, China
- Keila, Estonia
- Kaga, Ishikawa, Japan
- La Croix-en-Touraine, France
- Leck, Germany
- Sigulda, Latvia
- Sysmä, Finland
- Żnin, Poland

== Gallery ==
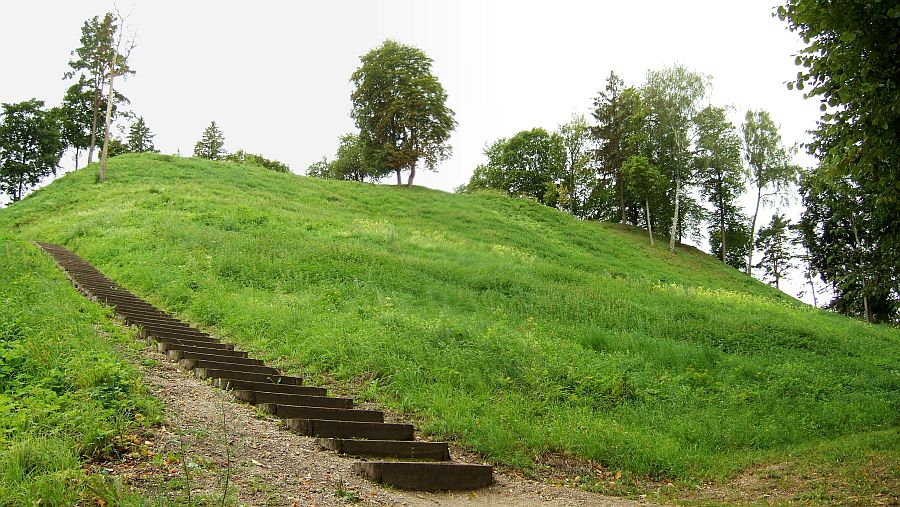
Vytautas Mountain

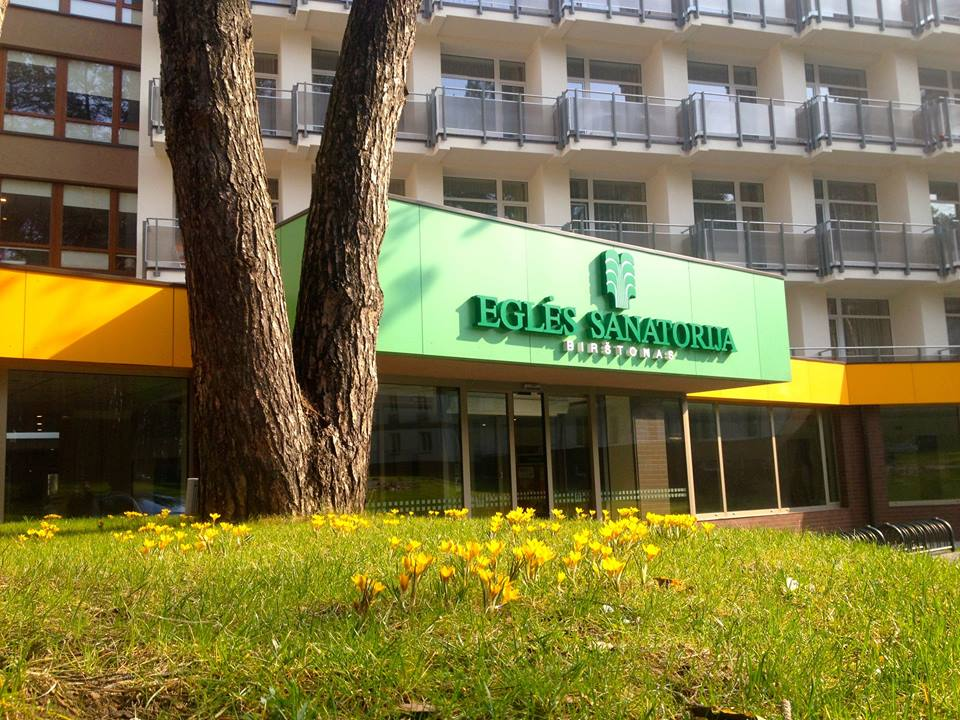
Early spring in "Eglės" sanatorija Birštonas

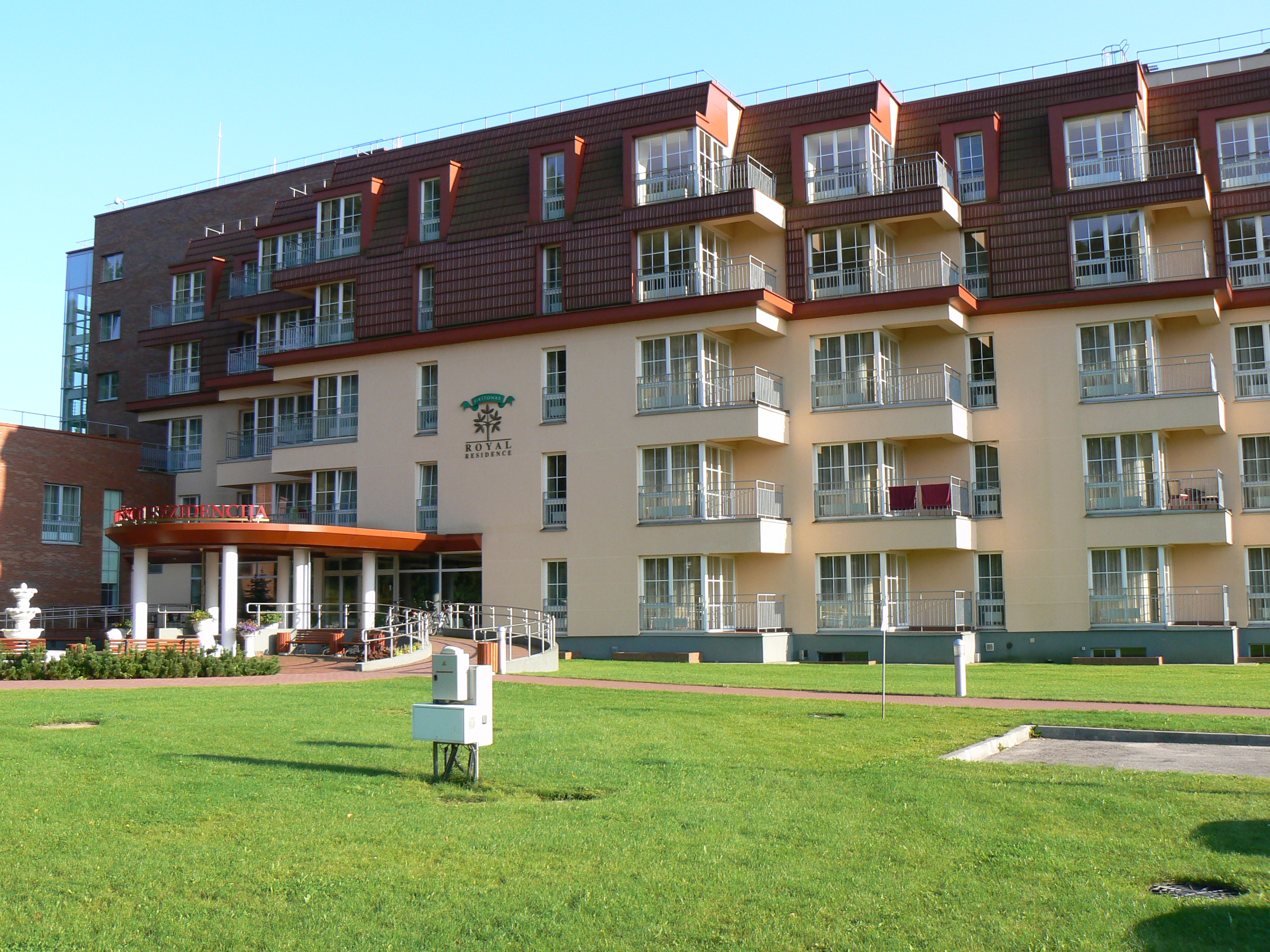
A hotel in Birštonas

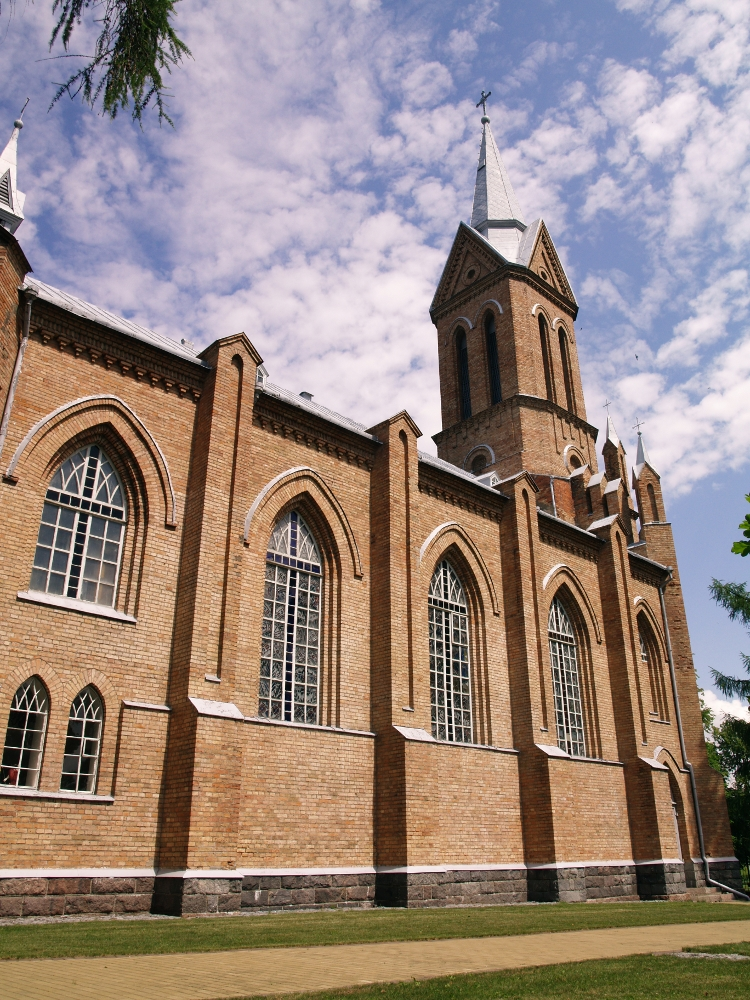
Birštonas church

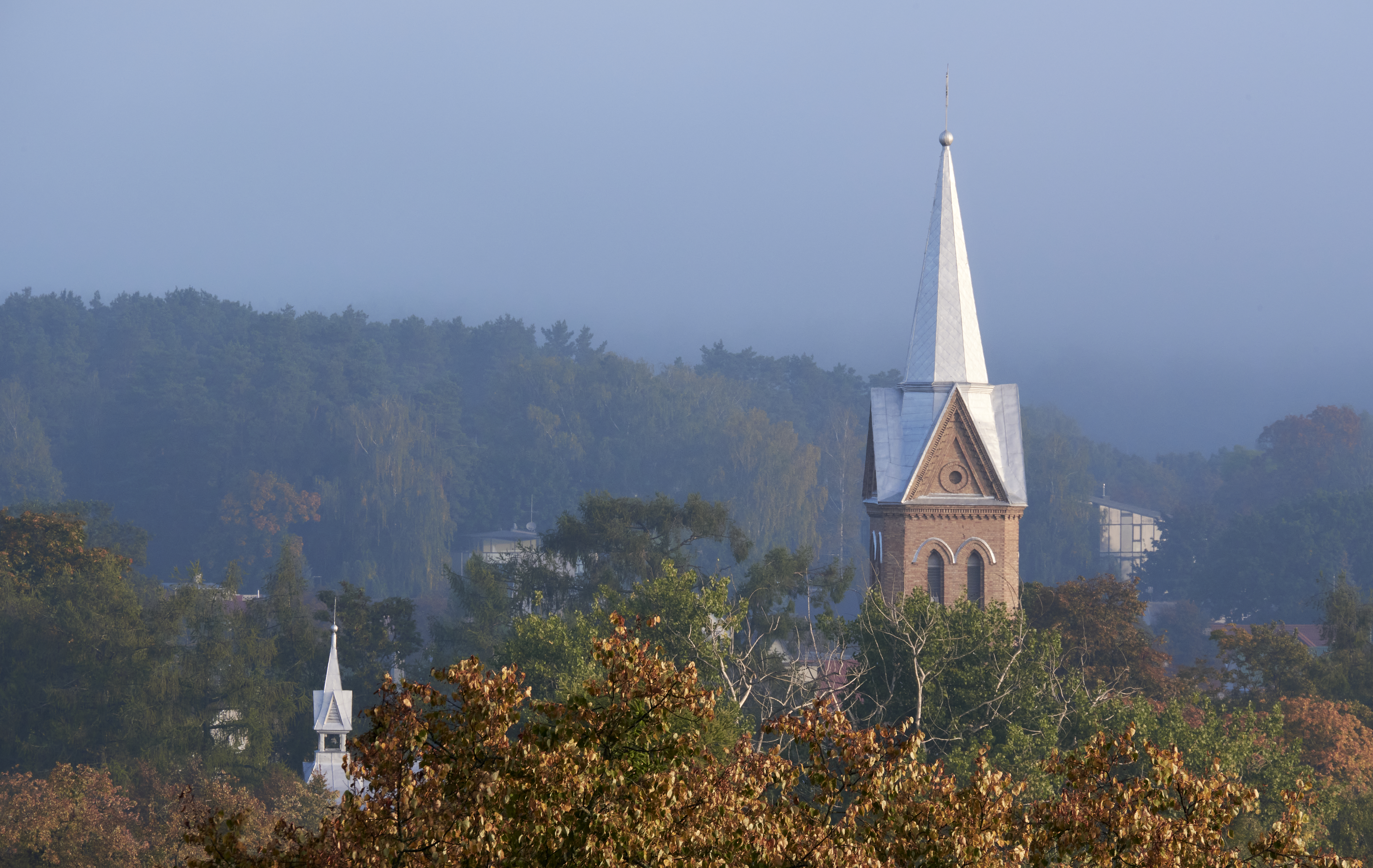
Birštonas church from Vytautas Mountain

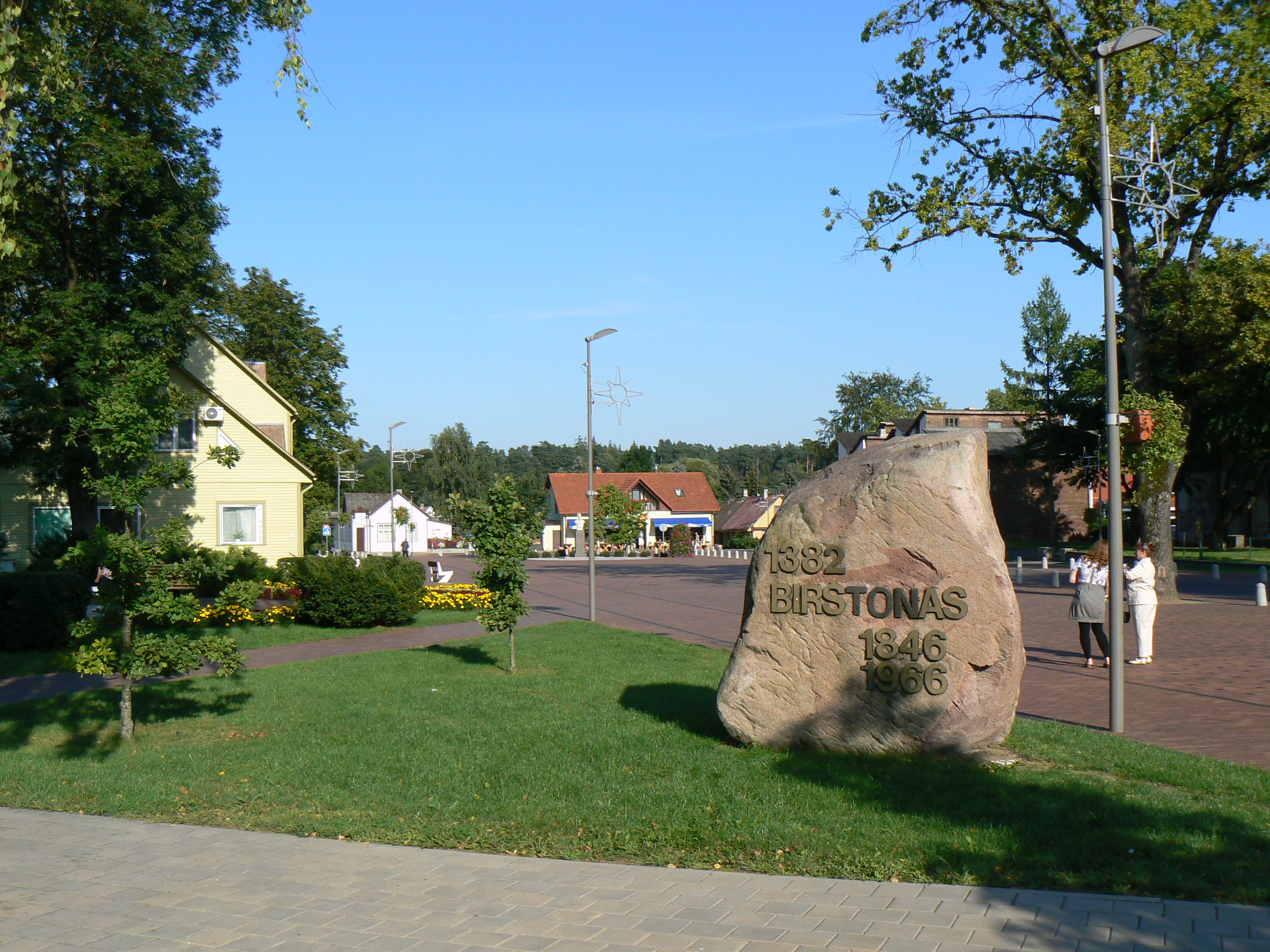
Jonas Basanavičius street

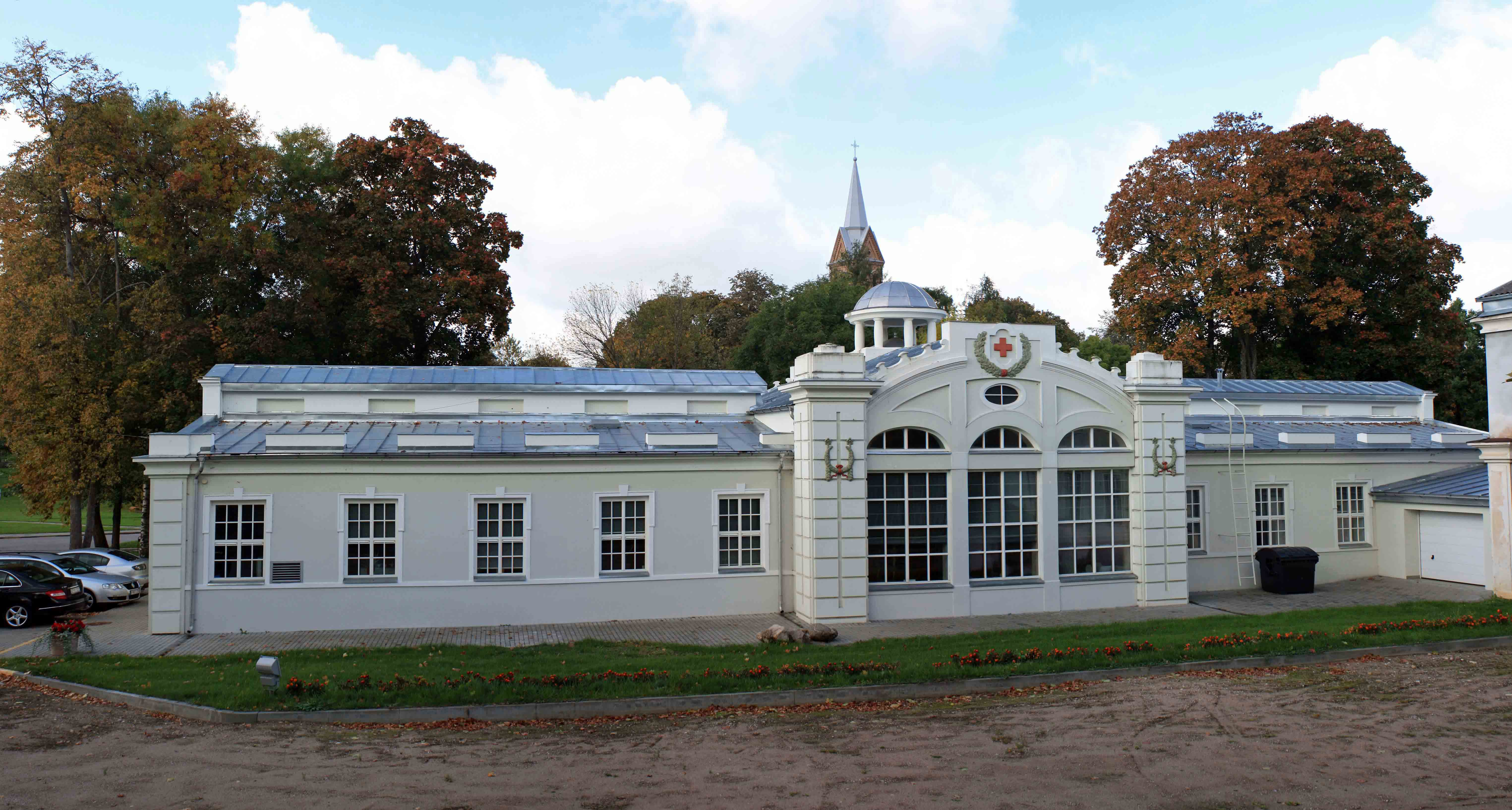
A sanatorium in Birštonas

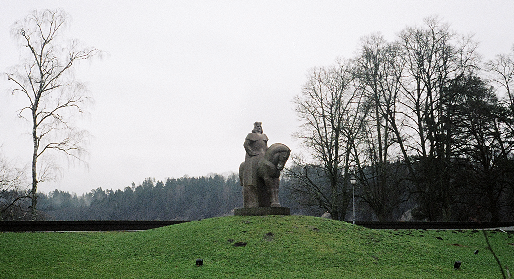
A monument to Vytautas

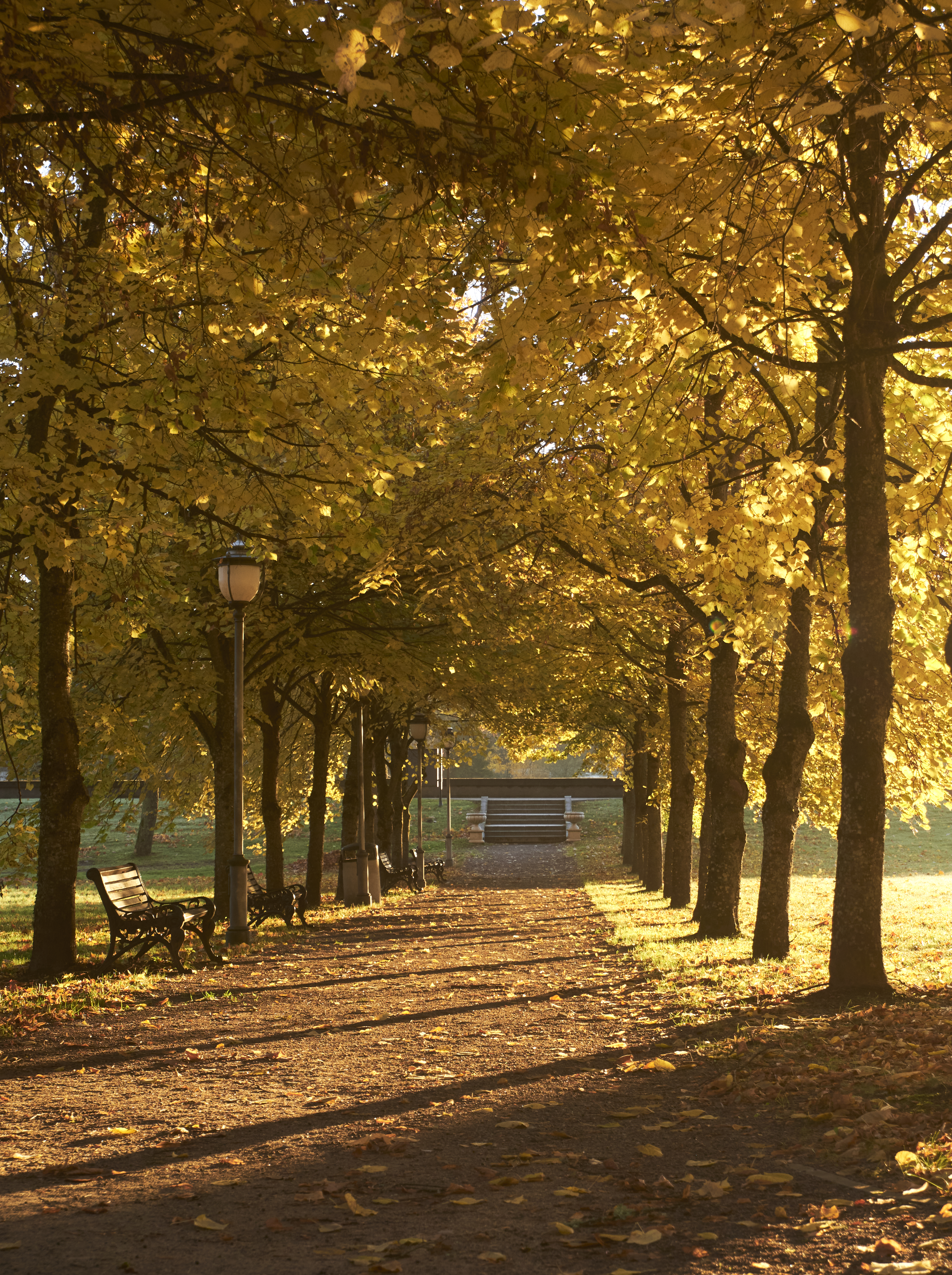
Vytautas park

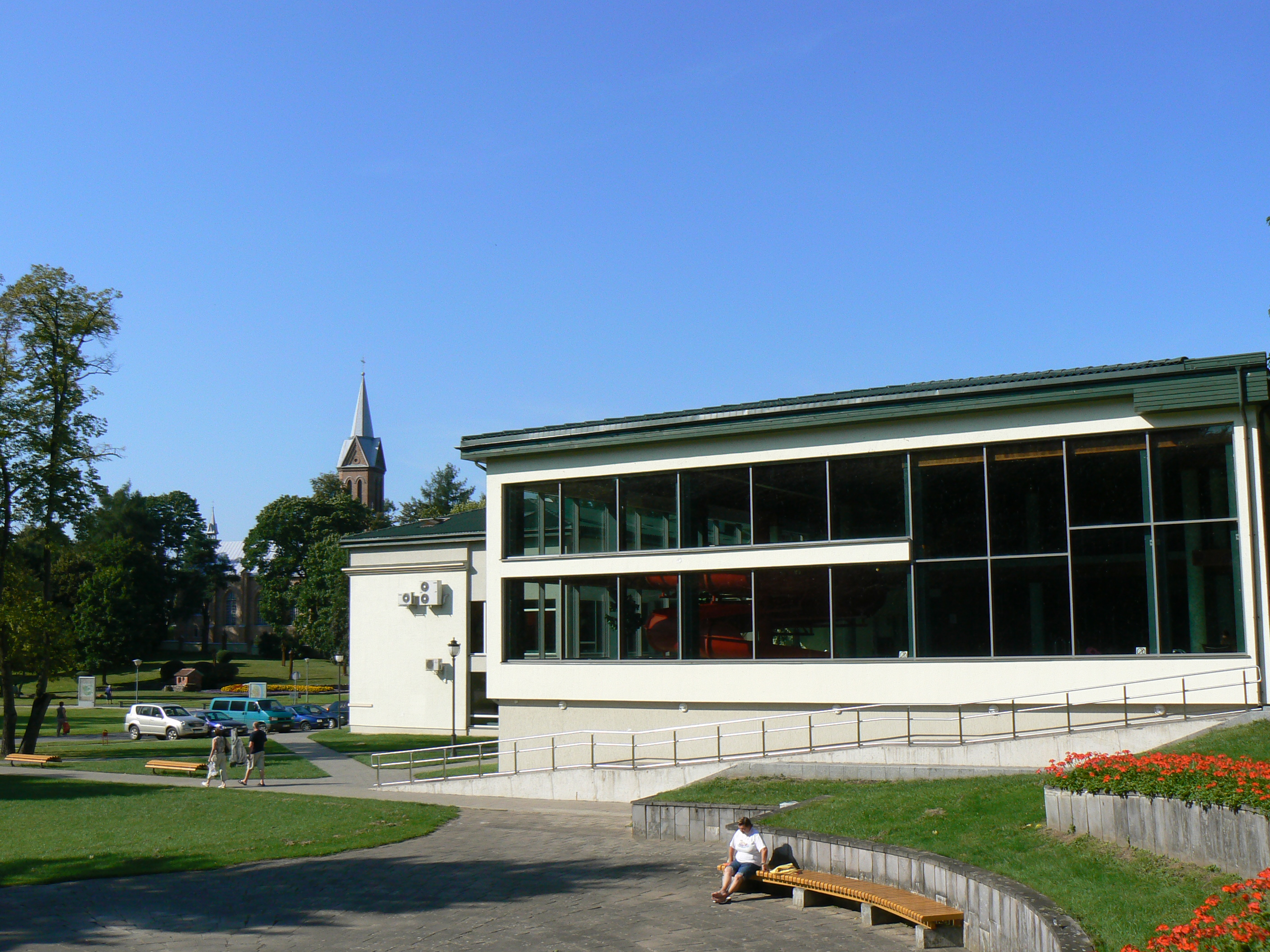
A sanatorium in Birštonas

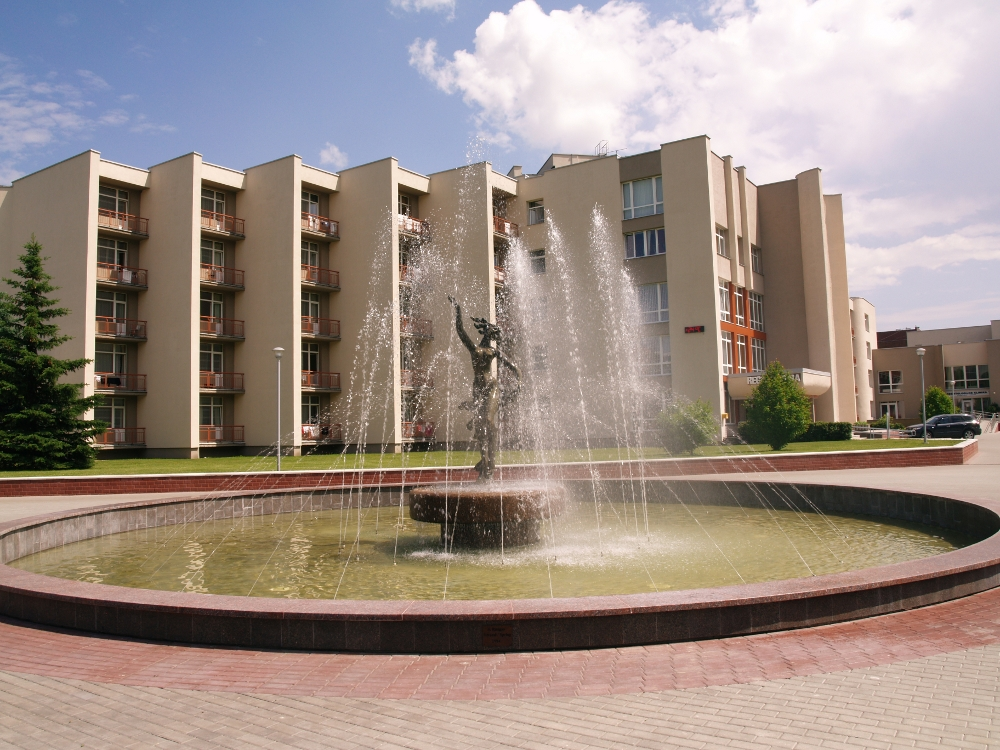
Sanatorium "Versmė"

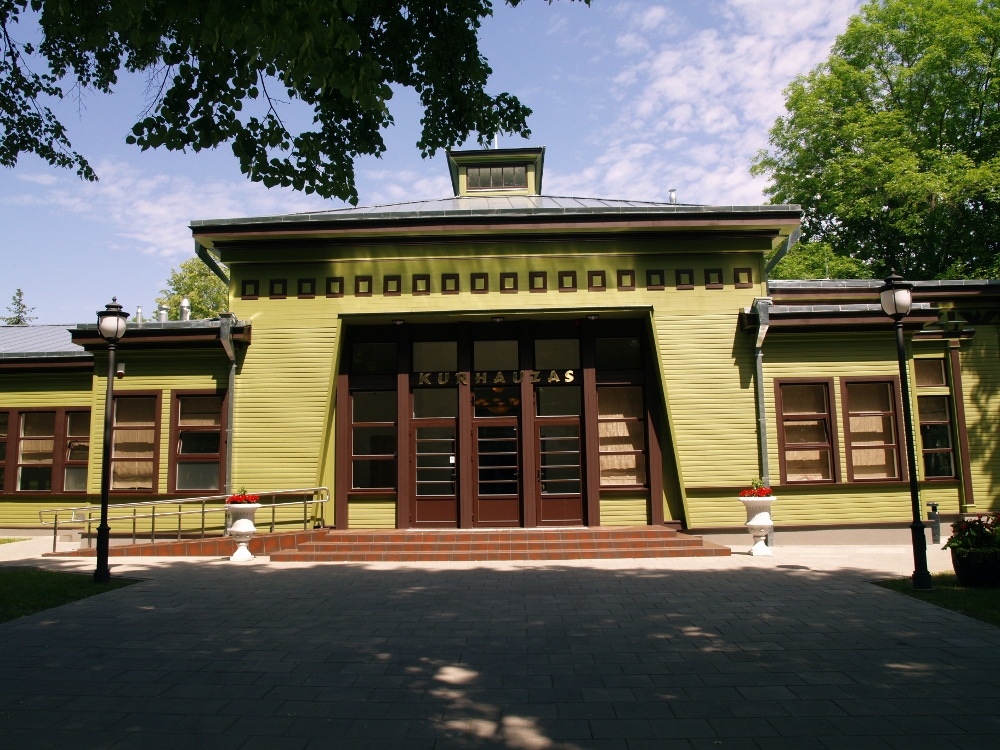
Kurhaus of Birštonas
