= Nikodim Silivanovich =

Russian painter and mosaicist (1834–1919)

- Никодим Юрьевич Силиванович
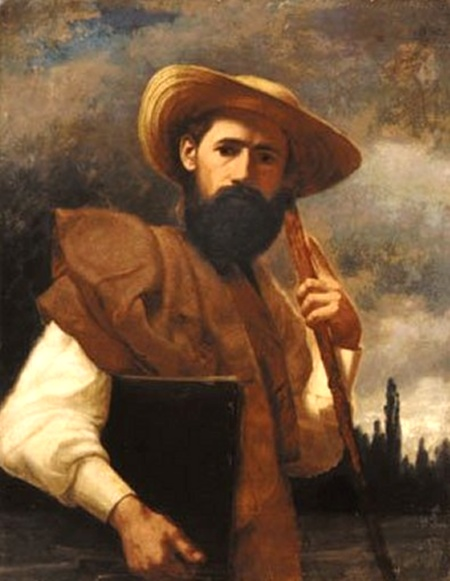
- Self-portrait with Straw Hat (c.1890)
- Born: December 25, 1834; Tsintsevich, Vilna Governorate
- Died: May 21, 1919 (aged 84–85); Tsintsevich, Vilna Governorate
- Education: Imperial Academy of Arts (1876)
- Known for: Painting, Mosaics

Nikodim Yurevich Silivanovich, or Nikodemas Silvanavičius (Belarusian: Нікадзім Юр'евіч Сілівановіч, 1834 – 1919) was a Russian painter and mosaicist, and a member of the Imperial Academy of Arts.

== Biography ==
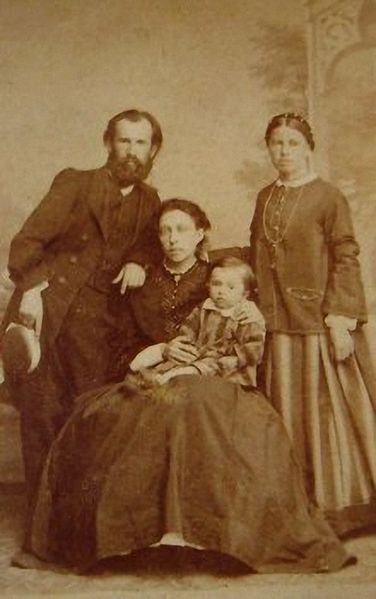
Silvanovich with his family

He was born into a family of serfs, in a village attached to the estate of a Bernardine monastery, and was able to receive his basic education at a school for the nobility in Maladzyechna. After graduating, he became a tutor to the children of a local landowner. Finding the job rather boring, he would often sketch to pass the time. His employer noticed Nikodim's talent for drawing and provided the funds for him to study at the "Society for the Encouragement of the Arts", in Saint Petersburg.

In 1856, he passed the entrance exams for the Imperial Academy of Arts, where he studied with Fyodor Bruni, Alexey Tarasovich Markov and Timofey Neff. He graduated in 1863 and was awarded the title of "free artist". For a short time, he lived in Vilnius, painting portraits, decorating churches and marrying the daughter of a local landowner.

However, the suppression of Lithuanian culture that followed the January Uprising made life there increasingly difficult, so he moved back to his hometown with his new wife, and the local uyezd commissioned him to decorate all the churches in its jurisdiction. He also created several icons, none of which have survived. For his work, he was awarded the title "Artist of the Third Degree" and returned to the academy in 1866 to learn how to make mosaics.

From that point on, mosaics formed the largest portion of his artistic output and he worked on several major projects throughout Saint Petersburg. He later achieved the titles of "Second Degree" and "First Degree" and was named an Academician in 1876. The same year, one of works ("Prisoners") was exhibited at the Centennial Exposition in Philadelphia. He was awarded the Order of Saint Stanislaus, 3rd degree, in 1881.

=== His wife's illness ===
Shortly after, his wife was diagnosed with tuberculosis. Concerned that Saint Petersburg's climate was bad for her, he bought a home near Birštonas, a health resort, where she lived with their son Josef, who had a paralyzed arm. He spent his summers and vacations there, roaming about, making sketches for paintings, and briefly operating a photography studio.

By 1898, he was a Counselor at the Imperial Academy but, after his wife died in 1901, he tendered his resignation, citing eye disease and old age, collected his pension, and moved to Birštonas permanently, where he set up a workshop in his home. In 1909, he was commissioned the Bishopric of Vilnius to create fourteen scenes depicting the Stations of the Cross for the new Church of Saint Jude the Apostle in Birštonas. In 1911, an inheritance enabled him to buy a post-station to provide Josef with a source of income. During World War I, he lived in Saint Petersburg. His place and date of death are disputed, but he probably settled in Prienai and died while on a visit to his native village.

== Selected works ==
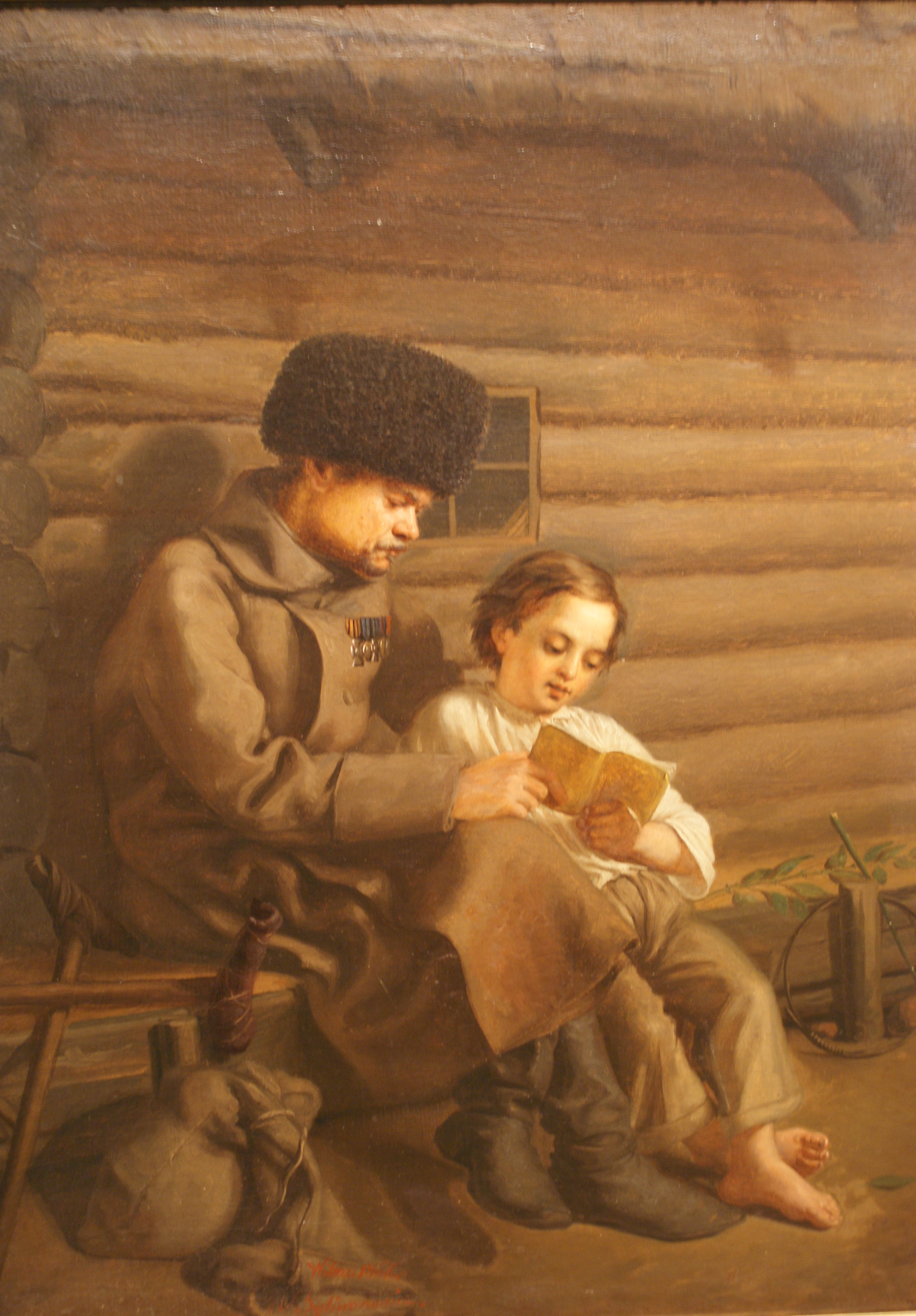
Soldier with a Boy (1866)

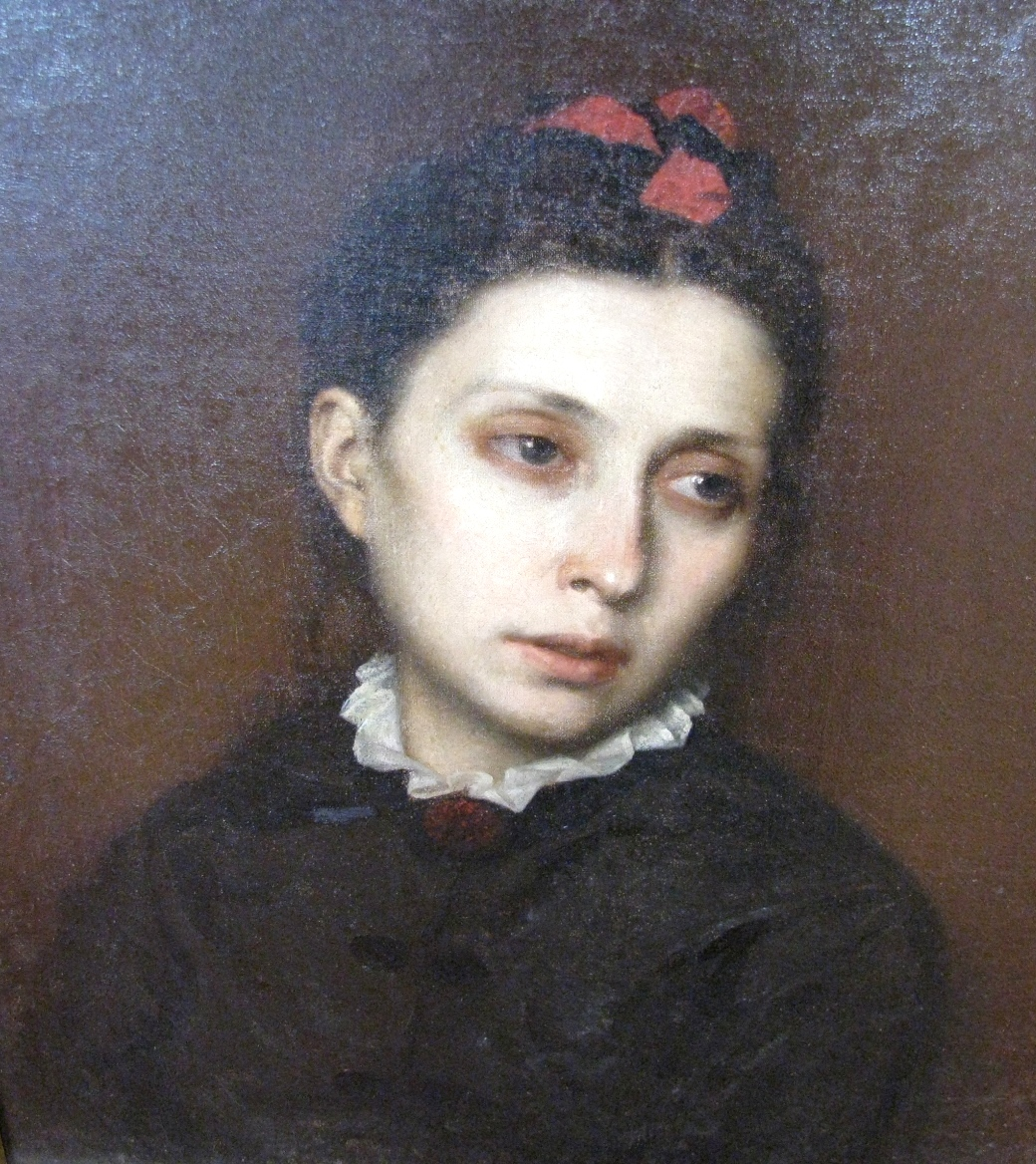
Portrait of his wife, Pelageya

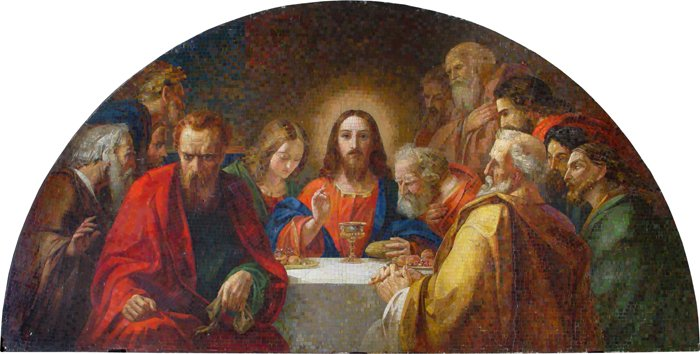
Mosaic of the Last Supper. Saint Isaac's Cathedral (1879-1887)

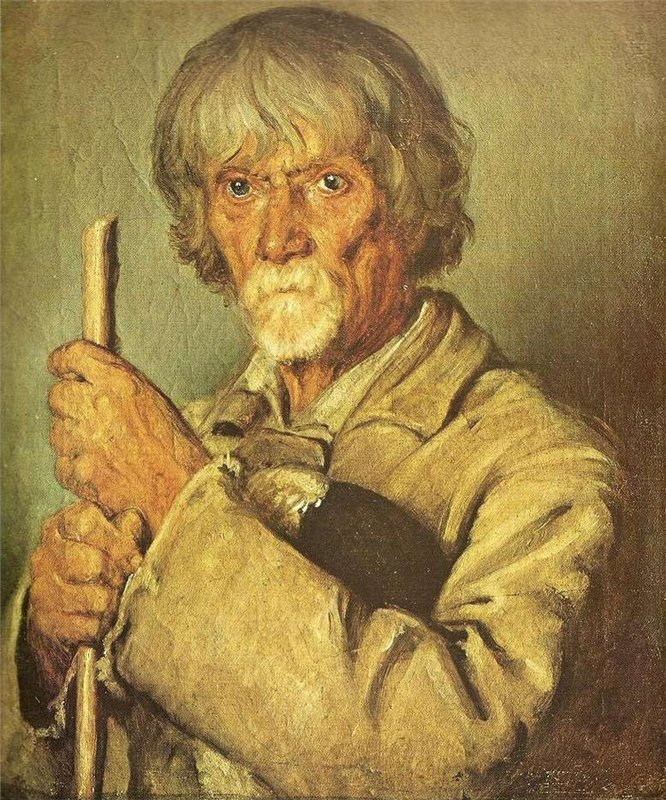
Shepherd (date unknown)
