= Aukštadvaris Manor =

Coordinates: 54°34′33″N 24°31′05″E

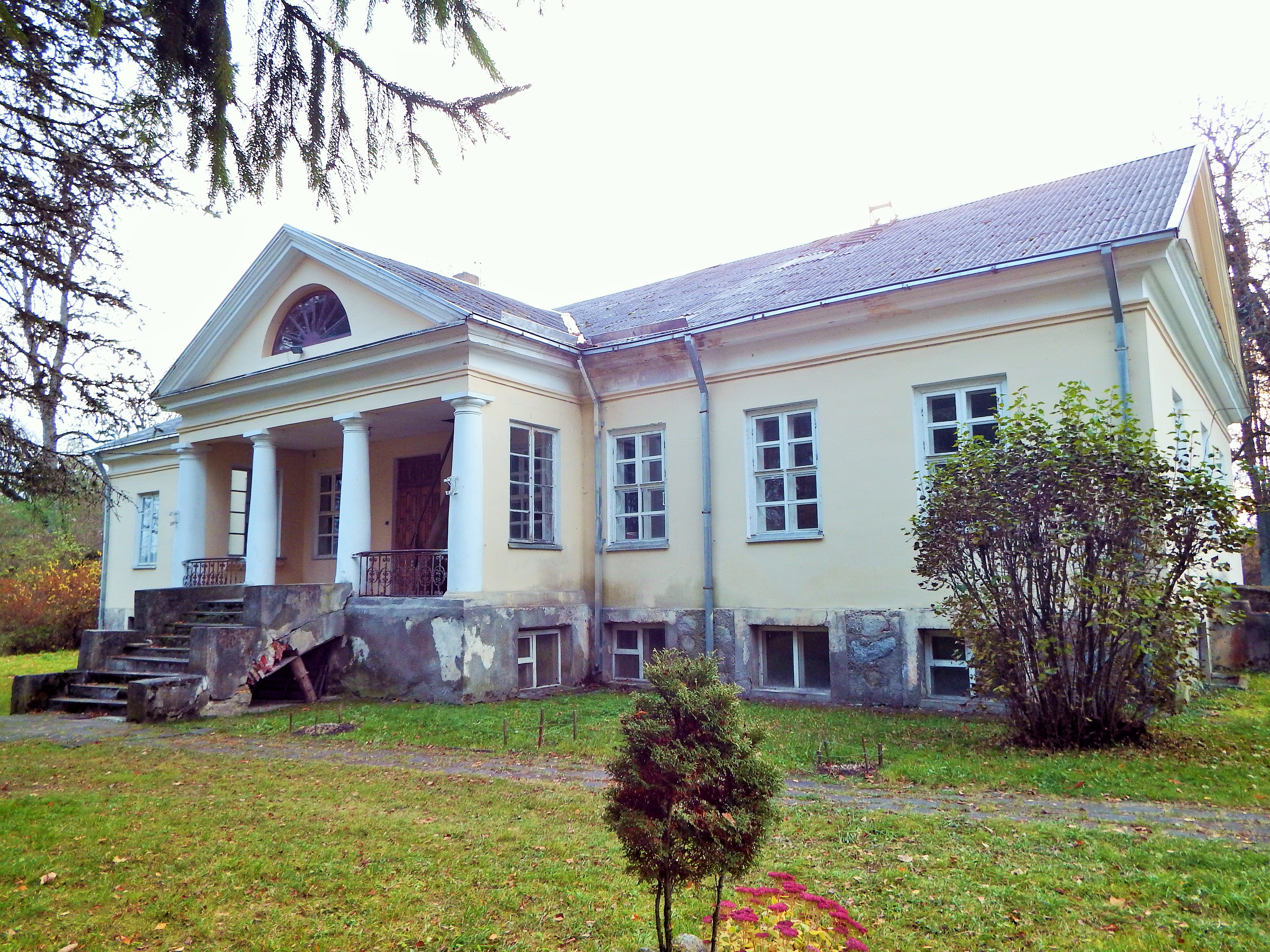
Aukštadvaris Manor

Aukštadvaris Manor is in Aukštadvaris, Lithuania. The palace, park, and ponds have survived.

== History ==
A manor was mentioned in Aukštadvaris in the 16th century. It stood on Aukštadvaris Hillfort.

In 1837, Antoni Malewski built the present-day manor complex with its park and trout ponds, which have survived up until now. The Malewski family controlled the manor until the First World War. A tuberculosis hospital operated at the manor after the Second World War.

One of the oaks in the manor garden is known as the Adam Mickiewicz Oak (natural monument; about 20 m high, 4.4 m wide). Philomath P. Malewski was a friend of Adam Mickiewicz and so the poet frequently visited Aukštadvaris. He loved to sit under the oak in the manor's park near Aukštadvaris Hillfort.
