= Nemunas Loops Regional Park =

Nature park

Coordinates: 54.58°N 23.97°E

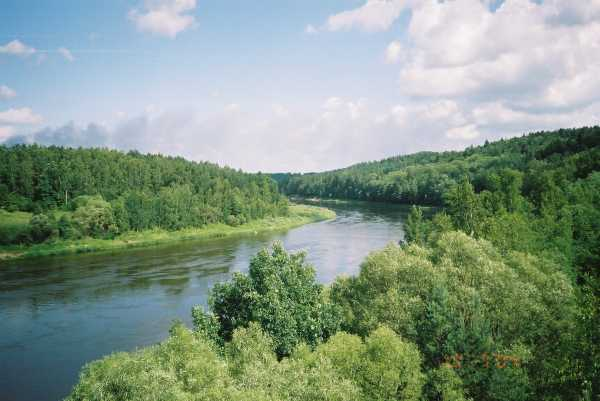
Neman River

Nemunas Loops Regional Park was established in 1992 to protect the historical, cultural, and natural character of the loops on the Neman (Nemunas) River in central Lithuania.

The park occupies 25,171 hectares. 69% of its area is forested. The resort areas of Birštonas and Punia lie within its boundaries. Its cultural significance is based on its archeological, ethnological, mythological, religious, architectural, and urban history.
