= Birštonas Municipality =

Birštonas Municipality Birštono savivaldybė
- Municipality
- Coat of arms

- Location of Birštonas Municipality within Lithuania

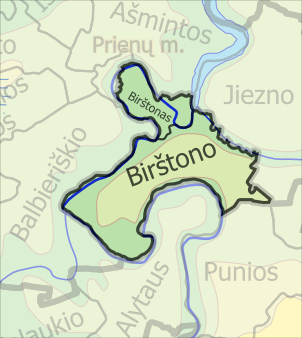
- Location of Birštonas
- Coordinates: 54°36′16″N 24°2′1″E
- Country: Lithuania
- Region: Dzūkija–Suvalkija
- County: Kaunas County
- Established: 1999 (27 years ago)
- Capital: Birštonas
- Elderships: 2

Government
  - Type: City Council
  - Body: Birštonas Council
  - Mayor: Nijolė Dirginčienė (LSDP)
  - Leading: Social Democratic Party 10 / 15

Area
  - Total: 122 km^{2} (47 sq mi)
  - Rank: 43rd

Population (2025)
  - Total: 4,052
  - Rank: 60th
  - Density: 33.81/km^{2} (87.6/sq mi)
  - Rank: 19th
- Time zone: UTC+2 (EET)
  - Summer (DST): UTC+3 (EEST)
- ZIP Codes: 59009–59454
- Phone code: +370 (319)
- Website: www.birstonas.lt

Birštonas Municipality is one of 60 municipalities of Lithuania.

== Mayors ==
1. Algirdas Radauskas (1987–1990)
2. Antanas Zenkevičius (1990–1991)
3. Jonas Aleknavičius (1991–1992)
4. Algirdas Radauskas (1992–1994)
5. Antanas Zenkevičius (1994–2007)
6. Nijolė Dirginčienė (2007)
7. Antanas Zenkevičius (2007–2008)
8. Nijolė Dirginčienė (2008-present)

== Elderships ==
Birštonas Municipality is divided into two elderships:

Eldership (Administrative Center)	Area	Population
Birštonas (Birštonas)	13 km^{2} (3,212.37 acres; 5.02 sq mi)	3,027
Birštonas Vicinity (Birštonas)	111 km^{2} (27,428.70 acres; 42.86 sq mi)	1,056
