= Antanas Juška =

Lithuanian folklorist and lexicographer

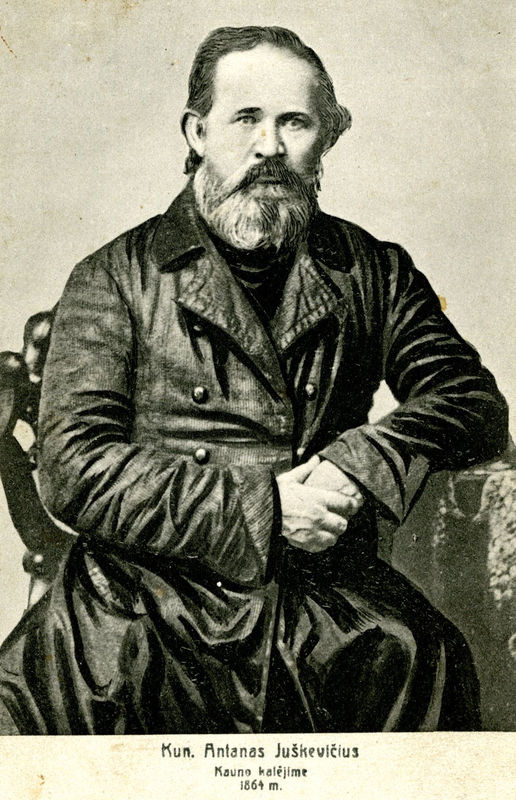
- Antanas Juška in 1864
- Born: 16 June 1819; Daujotai, Russian Empire
- Died: 1 November 1880 (aged 61); Kazan, Russian Empire
- Resting place: Arskoe Cemetery (reburied in Veliuona in 1990)
- Other names: Antanas Juškevičius; Antoni Juszkiewicz; Antoni Juszka
- Education: Vilnius Theological Seminary
- Occupations: Catholic priest, folklorist, lexicographer
- Known for: Collection of Lithuanian folk songs
- Movement: Lithuanian National Revival
- Relatives: Brother Jonas Juška

Antanas Juška (Polish: Antoni Juszkiewicz; 16 June 1819 – 1 November 1880) was a Lithuanian Roman Catholic priest known for his lifelong study of Lithuanian folk traditions. For about three decades, he observed the Lithuanian people, their traditions, and recorded their songs and vocabulary. Juška recorded about 7,000 Lithuanian folk songs, including about 2,000 songs with melodies, and wrote a 70,000-word Lithuanian–Polish dictionary. These works provide a wealth of information of the 19th-century Lithuanian life. His works were partially published with the help of his elder brother Jonas Juška.

With the help of his brother Jonas, Juška attended Kražiai College and later transferred to the Vilnius Theological Seminary. He was ordained as a Catholic priest and later worked in various locations in Lithuania – Antazavė, Obeliai (1845), and Zarasai (1846–1849), Ukmergė (1849–1855), Pušalotas (1855–1862), Lyduvėnai (1862), Vilkija (1862–1864), Veliuona (1864–1871), Alsėdžiai (1871–1879). During the failed Uprising of 1863, he was arrested and imprisoned for nine months on suspicions of sympathizing with the rebels. He died in Kazan in 1880.

Juška collected Lithuanian vocabulary and folk songs directly from the people. He wrote down the songs as they were performed – i.e. preserving nuances of the dialects. At about 7,000 songs, it was by far the largest collection of Lithuanian folk songs at the time (previously, a total of about 800 Lithuanian songs were published). However, only about 2,800 of them were published and the rest were lost during World War I. Despite the Lithuanian press ban, with the help of professor Jan Baudouin de Courtenay, three volumes of Lithuanian songs (a total of 1,586 songs) were published by the University of Kazan in 1880–1882 and a collection of 1,100 wedding songs was published by the Russian Academy of Sciences in 1883.

Juška also wrote three dictionaries – 7,000-word Polish–Lithuanian (around 1854), 6,000-word Latvian–Lithuanian–Polish (1875), and 70,000-word Lithuanian–Polish dictionaries. The first two dictionaries were never published. His largest dictionary was prepared not based on words picked out from published texts but from the local vernacular. He recorded words in sentences and explained their meaning in Lithuanian and only then translated them to Polish (later, Russian was added so that the dictionary could be published). Thus, he wrote an explanatory dictionary of the colloquial language. After Juška's death, his dictionary was edited by numerous linguists, including his brother Jonas, Vatroslav Jagić, Jonas Jablonskis, Kazimieras Būga, but the work was very slow and only three volumes up to the word kuokštuotis were published in 1897, 1904, and 1922.

== Biography ==
=== Early life ===
Juška was born in the village of Daujotai, near Ariogala. His parents were landless Samogitian nobles – the family had to rent farms from others and frequently moved from one location to another. His elder brother Jonas attended a Bernadine school in Dotnuva and was admitted to Kražiai College where he earned a living working as a superintendent in a students' dormitory. Jonas educated Antanas and he was admitted to the third grade at Kražiai College. Jonas graduated in 1839 and enrolled into the Kharkiv University. Left without financial support, Antanas enrolled into the Vilnius Theological Seminary which provided free education including room and board. Juška graduated in 1843 and became a priest in Antazavė, Obeliai (1845), and Zarasai (1846–1849). In Zarasai, he witnessed a typhoid epidemic and helped nurse the sick and bury the dead. He was then reassigned as a chaplain of a school in Ukmergė where he worked until 1855.

It appears that Juška started his studies of the Lithuanian language in Ukmergė. He asked his students to bring him examples of local dialects, idioms, proverbs, etc. He also read and was familiar with the latest publications on Lithuanian language and culture, including works by August Schleicher, Motiejus Valančius, Simonas Daukantas, Friedrich Kurschat, Kristijonas Donelaitis, Ludwig Rhesa. His brother Jonas, encouraged by professor Izmail Sreznevsky, also became interested in the Lithuanian language, but he was more a theoretician while Antanas more a practician working in the field to collect words and examples from the living people. The two brothers closely cooperated in their studies; Jonas frequently visited Antanas in Lithuania during summer vacations. Sometimes it is difficult to determine which manuscript was written by which brother.

Antanas' efforts to collect samples of Lithuanian vocabulary and songs intensified after he was relocated to Pušalotas in 1855. He also described local wedding traditions (the Russian language manuscript is unfinished). In 1861, during a canonical visitation, bishop Motiejus Valančius visited Juška in Pušalotas and urged him to publish his materials. Juška renovated the church in Pušalotas in 1853, rebuilt burnt rectory in 1857, and built a stone fence around the churchyard and the cemetery. Due to conflicts with local residents over land rights, Juška was reassigned to Lyduvėnai in 1862. However, Juška did not want to be a pastor as he wanted to devote his time to the studies of Lithuanian language and culture. Therefore, after about half a year, he defied Valančius' orders and left Lyduvėnai for a monastery in Dotnuva. He was then reassigned to Vilkija. It is said that he tied drunkards to a post in the town center so that they suffered public humiliation.

=== Uprising of 1863 ===
Close contacts with local villagers made Juška sympathetic to their plight. In 1863, he published a primer which was similar to other primers of the period except it lacked customary sample texts that instilled obedience to the nobility. There were rumors though there is no clear evidence that Juška assisted Antanas Mackevičius, one of the leaders of the Uprising of 1863, who was active in the area of Vilkija. In 1867, Juška's brother Jonas married Mackevičius' niece which only adds weight to the rumor. In July 1863, Russian soldiers searched the nearby manor in Padauguva. They found 13-year-old son of the manor tenant Vincas Juškevičius transcribing Lietuvos katekizmas (Catechism of Lithuania) in which the rebels described their goals and ideology in the traditional question-and-answer format of religious catechisms.

Juška was arrested and imprisoned in Kaunas Prison by the Tsarist police as he was suspected as the author or at least distributor of Lietuvos katekizmas. He was further suspected of supporting the rebels, maintaining contacts with them, and encouraging villagers to join the uprising. Residents of Vilkija sent a letter with 72 signatures to Nikolay Mikhailovich Muravyov, Governor of Kovno, asking for Juška's release. The Russian Academy of Sciences also sent a letter asking for his release as he was working on a much needed Lithuanian–Russian dictionary (in fact, he was working on a Lithuanian–Polish dictionary). The letter achieved its goal and Mikhail Muravyov-Vilensky, Governor General of Vilna, approved Juška's release on 22 February 1864. Juška, in poor health, was released after about nine months in prison. He needed to be put under the supervision of a trusted person, i.e. a parson. Therefore, upon release, he was reassigned as a vicar to Veliuona, but Tsarist police continued to be interested in his activities.

=== Collection and publication of songs ===
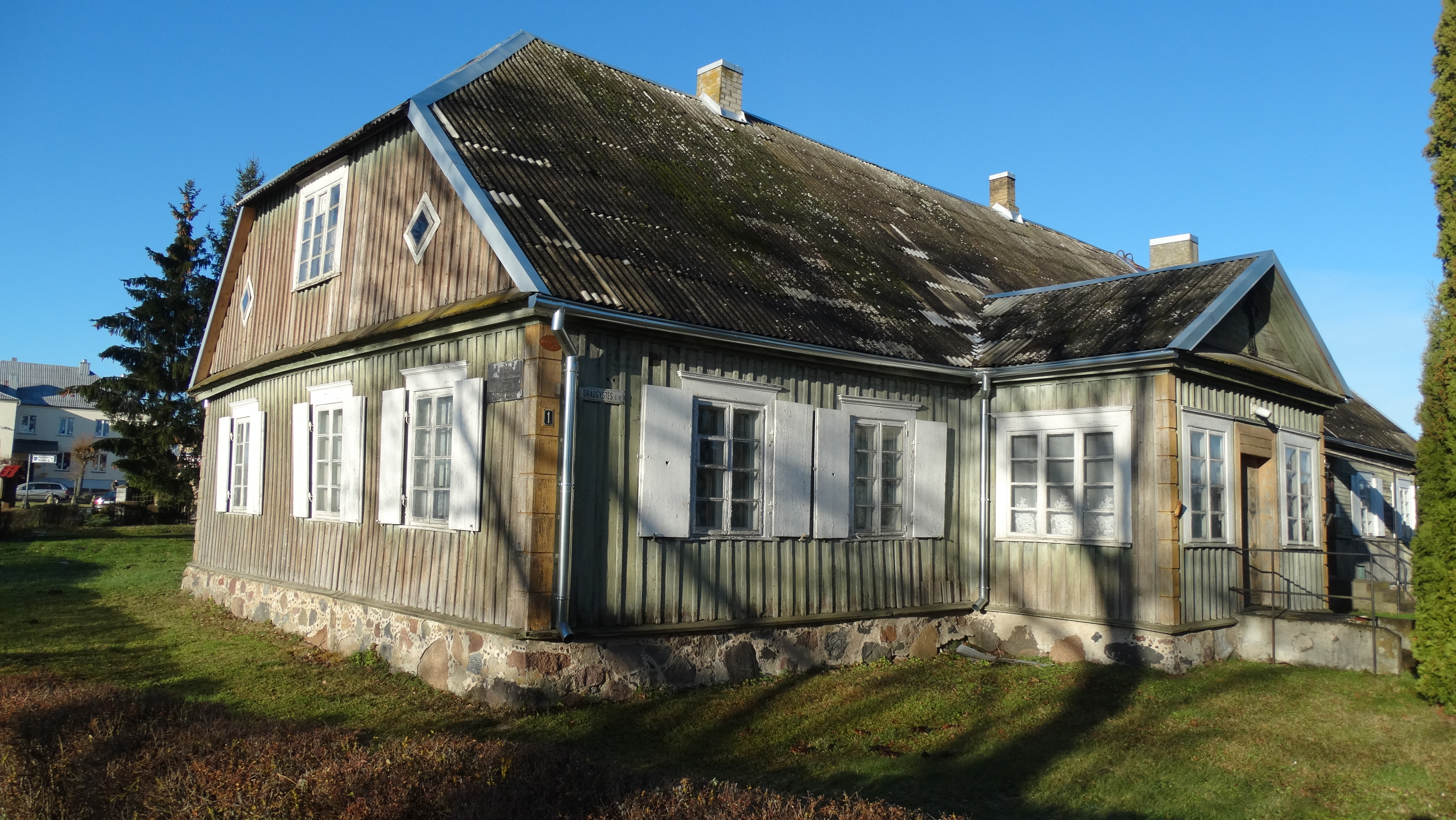
Rectory in Veliuona where Juška lived in 1864–1871

Juška was not deterred by his imprisonment or the Lithuanian press ban which outlawed publications in Lithuanian printed in the Latin alphabet. He continued to collect and record samples of Lithuanian folk songs. If anything, he became more devoted to the task. He wrote down not only song lyrics but also its melody. To help him with that he would carry a musical instrument (likely a clavichord) or asked singers to come to his house where he had a piano. It is unknown what kind of musical education Juška had. Juška liked to attend various celebrations and ceremonies (e.g. weddings) so that he could hear the songs as they were naturally performed. Many singers felt uncomfortable and were reluctant to perform if asked to sing on purpose. To overcome this, Juška offered small gifts (e.g. a candy, ring, spoon) and even cash to compensate for lost time and work. In an 1880 letter, Jonas Juška wrote that they spend several hundred of Russian rubles collecting the songs. He also organized song contests among local women; he offered silk headscarf for the winner. While living in Veliuona, Juška collected some 5,500 songs (i.e. about 1,000 songs per year), wrote his largest ethnographic study on Lithuanian wedding traditions, and continued to work on a Lithuanian dictionary.

Due to increasingly poor health (he had a heart condition and asthma), Juška requested a transfer and a demotion so he would not be burdened by the daily tasks of a priest. In 1871, he was transferred to Alsėdžiai as an altarista. Juška continued to work with the people and collect songs but poor health forced him to live more sedentary life. In three years, he learned Latvian language and wrote a Latvian–Lithuanian–Polish dictionary which he sent to the Science Commission of the Riga Latvian Society in 1875.

When Jonas Juška moved to Kazan and became acquainted with professor Jan Baudouin de Courtenay in 1875, the brothers began working on publishing material collected by Antanas in earnest. To expedite the process, Antanas moved to live in Kazan in 1879. He also sought better medical care for his illness, but after thirteen months of work in Kazan, Juška died on 1 November 1880. By the time of his death only the first segment of his song collection was published. Jonas Juška then devoted the rest of his life to the publication of Antanas' works. Three volumes of Lithuanian songs were published in Kazan in 1880–1882 and a volume with 1,100 wedding songs was published in Saint Petersburg in 1883. He also worked on publishing Antanas' dictionary but it was slow work and only parts of the dictionary were published by the time of Jonas Juška's death in May 1886.

== Memory ==
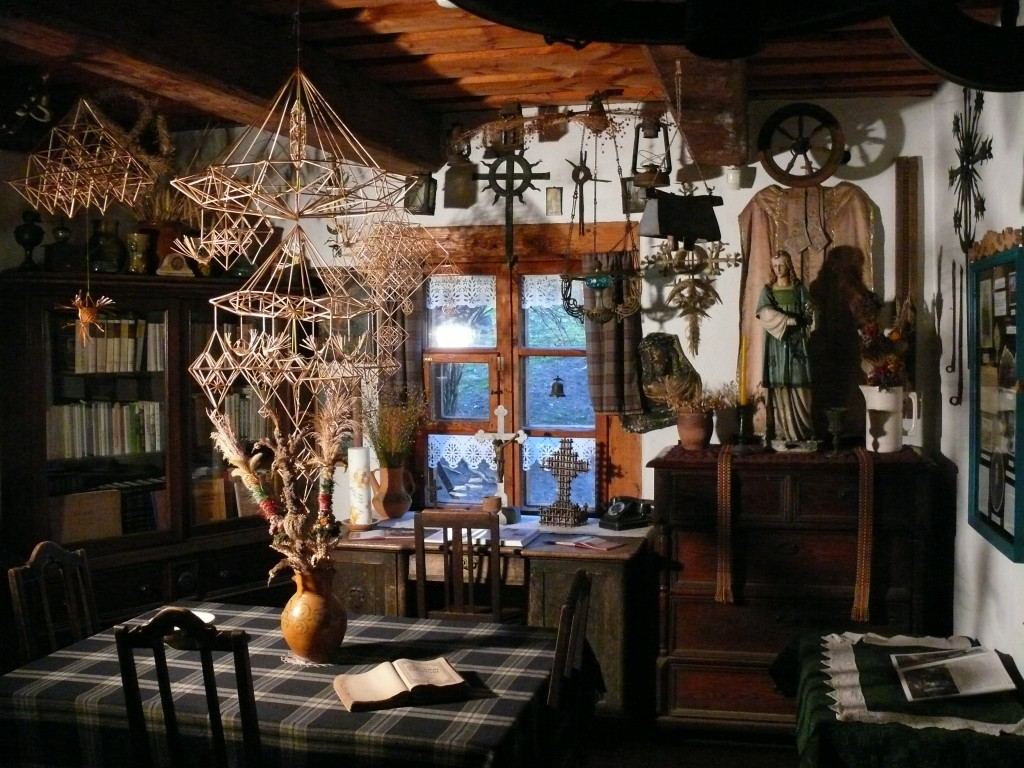
Interior of the ethnic culture museum in Vilkija named after brothers Juška

Both brothers were buried in a joint grave in the Arskoe Cemetery in Kazan. Antanas' tombstone was black with a Latin inscription; Jonas' tombstone was of white marble with a Lithuanian inscription. Antanas Mockus, who prepared Juška's songs for republication in the 1950s, proposed to rebury Juškas in Lithuania in 1952 but his efforts were refused until 1989. Governments of both Lithuania and Tatarstan had to give the appropriate permissions. A solemn mass was held at Vilnius Cathedral and the remains were transported to Veliuona where they were reburied in the churchyard on 3 November 1990. Jonas' tombstone was transferred from Kazan while Antanas' tombstone was recreated based on photographs as it was lost sometime before 1951.

In 1990, a museum of Lithuanian ethnic culture named after brothers Juškas was established in the former rectory in Vilkija where Antanas briefly worked in 1862–1864. In 1993, high school in Veliuona was renamed in honor of brother Juškas. A monument to Juška and three other priests who were also writers and lived in Pušalotas was unveiled in 2009. Streets named after Juška are located in Vilnius, Veliuona, and near Ramygala.

== Works ==
=== Folk songs ===
Over about thirty years, Juška recorded about 7,000 Lithuanian folk songs, including 1,852 songs with melodies. It was by far the largest collection of Lithuanian songs at the time. In total, about 2,800 songs collected by Juška were published, of them about 2,600 were recorded in Veliuona. Prior to that, only about 800 songs were published and the largest collection published by Georg Heinrich Ferdinand Nesselmann in 1853 had only 410 songs (of which about three quarters were already published elsewhere). Juška's manuscripts with songs were lost during World War I. Of some 4,000 unpublished songs, only 25 are known. Juška's collection encouraged others, including Matas Slančiauskas and Adolfas Sabaliauskas, to collect Lithuanian songs and other folklore. It was also used by Lithuanian poets (e.g. Maironis) and composers (e.g. Mikalojus Konstantinas Čiurlionis) to study and imitate Lithuanian songs. The songs also influenced the folk singers. For example, Jonas Kumetis, a local organist in Veliuona, organized a choir which performed songs from Juška's collection.

==== Publication history ====
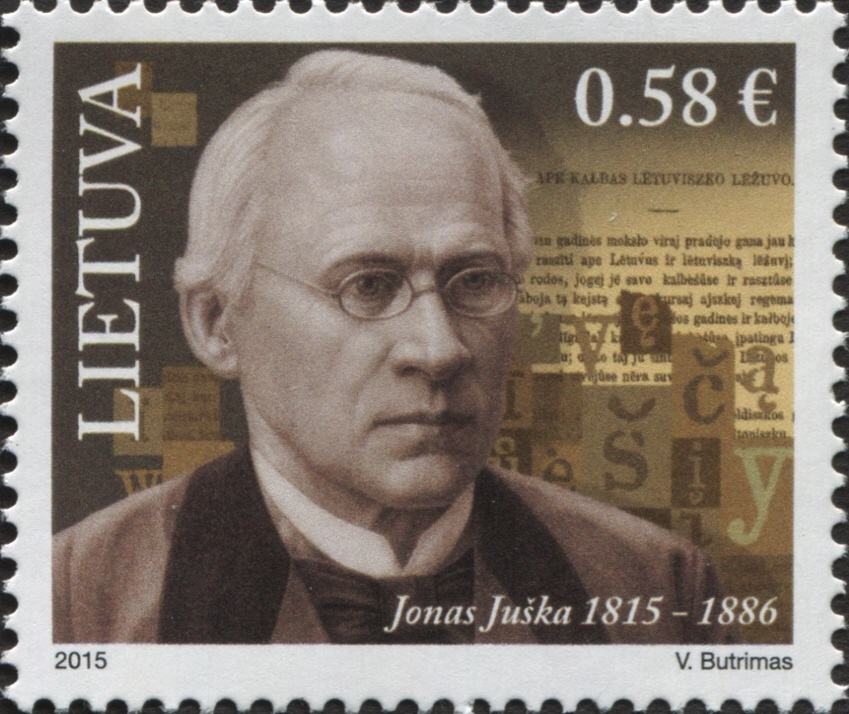
Jonas Juška on a postal stamp issued in 2015

The first booklet with 33 Lithuanian songs and their translations to Russian was published by the Russian Academy of Sciences in 1867. Due to the Lithuanian press ban, the Lithuanian words had to be transcribed in the Cyrillic script. Jonas Juška adapted the Cyrillic script to Lithuanian phonetics by introducing new letters (11 letters based on Cyrillic characters and a single letter j borrowed from the Latin alphabet), but the publication was not well received in Lithuania due to the script. Due to such reaction, Juška delayed further publications. The collection included a variety of songs: about half of them were wedding songs, but others varied from a war song that recalled the times of the Lithuanian Crusade to variations of two poems by Antanas Strazdas. The songs were treated primarily as material for language studies and not as works of poetry. Therefore, they were grouped based on the dialect and not on the theme or topic.

Four large volumes of songs were published in 1880–1883, already after Juška's death, in the Latin alphabet despite the Lithuanian press ban. With the help of Jan Baudouin de Courtenay, Jonas Juška convinced the University of Kazan to use its autonomy and publish three volumes of songs (but Juška had to pay the publication expenses). With the help of Yakov Grot, the Russian Academy of Sciences obtained a special exemption from Tsar Alexander II of Russia to publish a collection of wedding songs.

A few times, songs collected by Juška were republished in small booklets. In 1901, Petras Vileišis published a selection of 50 songs (republished in 1905 and 1909). In 1906, Vilniaus žinios published a selection of 44 songs. The full four volumes were republished in full only in 1954–1955.

One copy of the first volume of songs was gifted by Juška to Rozalija Gotautaitė-Cvirkienė, one of the singers who contributed songs to the collection. In 1905, priest Juozas Montvila borrowed the book saying he would attempt to have it reprinted in the United States. Montvila died in the sinking of RMS Titanic in April 1912. The book was recovered from the wreck and offered in an auction in 2012.

==== Types of songs ====
In preparing these publications, Juškas brothers faced a challenge of organizing and classifying the songs. The wedding song classification by their function (i.e. their sequence in the wedding ceremony) was rather successful and was later largely adopted (with modifications) by the Institute of Lithuanian Literature and Folklore. The wedding song collection contained 1,100 songs plus eleven songs had added verses for variations, thus effectively increasing the total song count to 1,111. The songs were divided into three broad categories – matchmaking (463 songs), wedding (302 songs), and the first visit of the bride to her parents (243 songs) – and subdivided into more specific topics. The classification of other songs was much less successful and faced criticism while the books were still in printing. Juškos divided the songs into broad categories – wedding, love, feast, war, mythological, laments, and mixed. However, mixed songs were published first and took up the first two volumes published in Kazan.

The three volumes published in Kazan had a total of 1,586 songs. The first two volumes had 1,023 numbered songs, but there are some inconsistencies in the numbering and the total is 1,028. Plus, there are 12 songs variations bringing the total to 1,040 songs. These songs are varied in their topic and are largely unsorted and unclassified. Researcher Antanas Mockus counted about 70 wedding-themed songs, 60 war songs, 30 feast songs, 350 love songs, 100 songs about family life, etc. There are also about 70 songs that were adapted from poems mainly written by Antanas Strazdas, as well as by Antanas Vienažindys and Laurynas Ivinskis. The longest song of 37 verses is a poem by an unknown author. The third volume included 47 feast songs, 106 war/military songs, 26 laments mixed in with other death-themed songs, mythological songs, 205 short mostly humorous songs, and a separate section for 100 songs collected in Alsėdžiai. About a fifth of all songs were reworked poems by different poets. While there were some attempts to print similar songs next to each other, there are a handful of cases when the same song or its close variations were printed several times in different sections.

==== Song context ====
Many earlier collectors of folklore wrote down only the song lyrics or melody, often edited to remove imperfections and disregarding the context in which they were recorded. However, in the 1860s, Russian researchers began developing a new more scientific approach to collecting and recording ethnographic data. The new method called for recording authentic data (including preservation of dialects and language nuances), providing notes and context (including who, when, and how provided the data), and registering as much data as possible (including variations). Juškas brothers largely tried to adhere to these standards and recorded the songs as they were performed abstaining for editorial changes. In particular, they tried to preserve the dialect but it is impossible to verify how well they did as their original notes and manuscripts were lost. They used the argument that to preserve the nuances of the dialects and their scientific value, the songs could not be transcribed in Cyrillic and needed to be published in the Latin alphabet. They also marked word stress (as suggested by Kazimieras Jaunius) but it was not done consistently and there are errors.

Juška left some notes on the song's context (i.e. that it was performed by shepherds or during a harvest ceremony) but it was not done systematically as the standards for folklore collection were just developing. He also recorded where the song was recorded (general area around a bigger town and not a specific village) and later started recording singer's name. However, he did not indicate when the songs were recorded. Identifying the singer was a gradual development that signified a shift in the attitudes towards folk culture in general. Earlier, the singer was just a faceless representative of the people, but researchers (including Juška) started valuing them as individual artists who made individual contributions to the oral tradition. Juška started recording singers' last names around 1862 likely in response to criticism faced by Pavel Rybnikov who published the first volume of Russian songs in 1861 (researchers doubted the authenticity of bylinas in his collection and criticized him for not providing any context for the collected songs). Juška not only recorded singers' last name but also highlighted the best singers and described them in general in the foreword of his collection: age, place of residence, social status, education, occasional biographical detail, how many songs were provided. A handful of singers provided hundreds of songs; for example, 410 songs were provided by Bakšaitienė, 274 songs by Juškytė, 237 songs by Blažienė, 234 songs by Norvilienė. In total, Juška recorded songs from 139 singers from around Veliuona.

=== Melodies ===
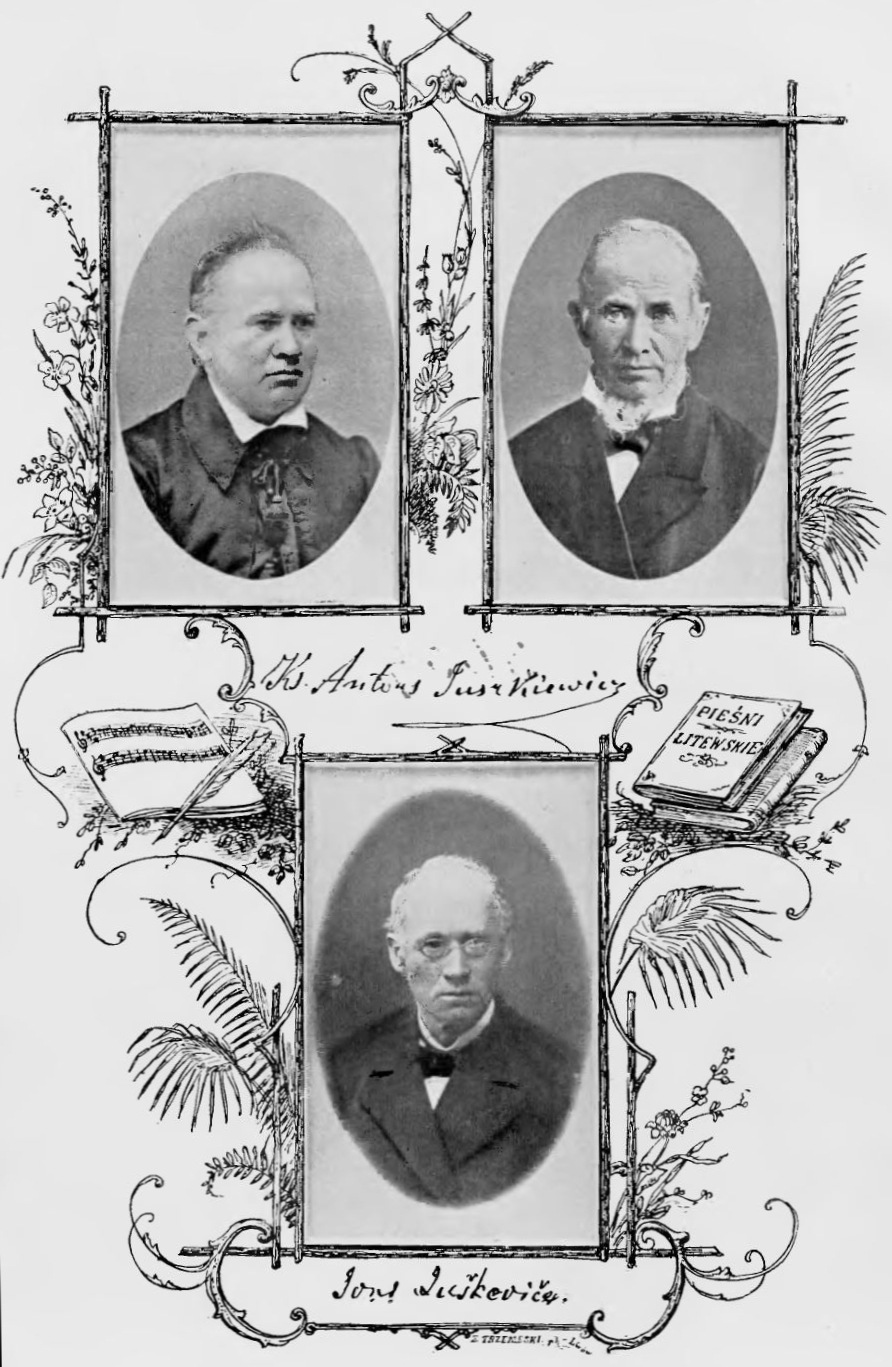
Portraits of brothers Juška (Antanas two to photos; Jonas at the bottom) in the collection of Lithuanian song melodies Melodje ludowe litewskie published in 1900

There is no evidence that the Juška brothers attempted or contemplated publishing song melodies. The manuscripts were inherited by Jan Baudouin de Courtenay who sent them to the Polish Academy of Arts and Sciences in Kraków. The academy asked Oskar Kolberg, who had already published his own collection of Lithuanian folk songs and their melodies, to prepare the manuscript for publication. However, Kolberg died in 1890 having prepared only 120 melodies. The work was then continued by Izydor Kopernicki (he died in 1891), Baudouin de Courtenay, and Zygmunt Noskowski. The 1,780 melodies were finally published in early 1900. The publication was indicated as "part I", but it is unknown what was intended to be published as the second part.

The editors, who were not experts in Lithuanian folk songs, faced many difficulties because Juška's notes were often unclear, imprecise, or erroneous as he had no formal musical education. In total, Juška recorded 1,852 melodies. The editors removed duplicates and otherwise unfit melodies and published 1,706 melodies with edits and 5 with no edits to demonstrate Juška's style in recording them. The editors included a lengthy foreword and introduction in Polish and German outlining the difficulties and editorial decisions that were taken. For example, many melodies were raised by an octave or had pitch changed (to avoid too many flat or sharp signs). Noskowski also added notes for the last syllable of a verse not knowing that it was a common feature of Lithuanian songs for the last syllable to be silent.

The resulting publication was met with mixed reviews – praised for the large number of melodies and criticized for the inaccuracies. Many melodies had their beat, rhythm, cadence, foot, etc. simplified or confused. Such simplifications even led Noskowski to conclude that Lithuanian folk songs were rather poor in terms of their rhythm – a conclusion that has been refuted and rejected by Lithuanian researchers. The simple metre (usually triple or duple) and rather monotonous use of quarter notes (which were commonly used in church choirs) are likely attributable to Juška as his lack of musical education. However, errors in cadence or errors in determining correct syllables are likely attributable to the editors. When Juška's melodies were prepared for republication in the 1950s, essentially all of them were reedited by Jadvyga Čiurlionytė.

=== Dictionaries ===
Around 1850, Juška started collecting materials for a Lithuanian language dictionary. Lithuanians still used the Polish–Latin–Lithuanian dictionary by Konstantinas Sirvydas first published in 1620. Therefore, several Lithuanian activists – including Simonas Daukantas, Mikalojus Akelaitis, Laurynas Ivinskis, Dionizas Poška, Simonas Stanevičius, and Kiprijonas Nezabitauskis – are known to have started compiling a dictionary but their works were not published. Juška discovered the manuscript of Poška's dictionary.

Around 1853–1854, Juška compiled about 7,000-word Polish–Lithuanian dictionary. The words were also translated to Latin and Russian. He did not attempt to publish it and the manuscript is kept at the Institute of Lithuanian Literature and Folklore. He also wrote a 6,000-word Latvian–Lithuanian–Polish dictionary which he sent to the Science Commission of the Riga Latvian Society in 1875.

From around 1856, Juška began writing down not individual words but phrases and sentences and collected some 30,000 words used in a sentence over the next twenty years. He wrote a Lithuanian–Polish dictionary. Toward the end of the dictionary, Juška also added Latvian equivalents. Juškas brothers approached the Russian Academy of Sciences regarding the publication of the dictionary which was favorably reviewed by Alexander Potebnja. Jonas Juška edited the dictionary after Antanas' death and translated it to Russian. He completed his edits up to the letter L but managed to print only 10 author's sheets worth of material. After Juška's death, the dictionary was edited by numerous other linguists – Vatroslav Jagić, Filipp Fortunatov, Vytautas Juška (Jonas' son), Jonas Jablonskis, Jurgis Šlapelis, Kazimieras Būga – but the work was very slow and only three volumes were published over the next four decades (letters A–D in 1897, letters E–J in 1904, and up to the word kuokštuotis in 1922). The published volumes contained 997 pages and about 30,000 words. The full dictionary had about 70,000 words.

The dictionary was an important development in Lithuanian lexicography. Juška was the first to record words not from published works but from the everyday language of the people. He recorded words in sentences and explained their meaning in Lithuanian and only then translated them to other languages. Thus he started with an explanatory dictionary and created a valuable record of the colloquial language of the second half of the 19th century. This provides researchers with ethnographic data on the everyday life in a Lithuanian village. The dictionary includes loanwords, vulgarities, and setencences that express dissatisfaction with social inequalities. However, because the words were recorded from the spoken language, some words are of dubious authenticity and they are near impossible to verify. Therefore, several times Jonas Jablonskis and Kazimieras Būga traveled to areas where Juška lived in attempt to verify and clarify words that were not previously known. Another key weakness of the dictionary was lack of proper accentuation (this was later corrected by Jablonskis and Būga) and sometimes incorrect markings of long and short vowels, particularly in words from the Samogitian dialect.

Jablonskis (who edited the second volume from 1897) was critical of Juška's dictionary. However, he was not allowed to add or delete words from Juška's manuscript. Therefore, in the process of editing, correcting, and verifying Juška's work, Jablonskis collected about 14,500 cards with Lithuanian words (many taken from Juška's dictionary) and planned a new dictionary. The dictionary was not written, but Jablonskis' cards were used by Būga and entered the Academic Dictionary of Lithuanian.

=== Other works ===
In 1863, he published a primer which was similar to other primers of the period except it lacked customary sample texts that instilled obedience to the nobility. He prepared two versions of the primer – one in Samogitian and another in eastern Aukštaitian dialects. However, when printing the primer, he settled on a "middle" road based on the western Aukštaitian dialect. He used ṡ and ċ instead of widely used sz and cz borrowed from the Polish language.

In 1880, Juška published ethnographic work Svotbinė rėdą veliuoniečių lietuvių (Wedding Traditions of Lithuanians in Veliuona) which he wrote in 1870. It was translated into German, Polish and in abbreviated form, into Russian. It was the first detailed local Lithuanian ethnographic work written from personal observations. The wedding ceremony (which lasted about a week) was divided into 53 episodes. For example, one episode concerned putting a headscarf (typically worn by married women) on the bride thus signifying her transition into her new role. It remains the most important source on the Lithuanian wedding traditions.

== Bibliography ==
- Ibianska, Vanda (29 November 2019). Mažai žinomi mūsų šviesuoliai. Antanas ir Jonas Juškos (in Lithuanian). Artuma via Bernardinai.lt.
- Jonikas, Petras (1972). "Juška (Juškevičius), Antanas". Encyclopedia Lituanica. Vol. II. Boston, MA: Jonas Kapočius. LCCN 74-114275.
- Klimas, Antanas (Winter 1981). "Kazimieras Buga and the Academic Dictionary of Lithuania". Lituanus. 4 (27). ISSN 0024-5089. Archived from the original on 2020-07-28.
- Kriaučiūnienė, Genovaitė (April 2013). "Pušaloto praeities puslapius praskleidus..." (PDF). Sandara (in Lithuanian). 1 (59). ISSN 2029-5146. Archived from the original (PDF) on 2017-04-23.
- Merkienė, Regina (2001). "Kultūrinio teritorinio tapatumo išraiška ir tradicijų pavidalai kaimo gyvenime (XIX a. antroji – XX a. pirmoji pusė)". In Girininkienė, Vida (ed.). Veliuona (PDF) (in Lithuanian). Vilnius: Versmė. ISBN 978-9955-589-87-7.
- Merkys, Vytautas (1994). Knygnešių laikai 1864–1904 (in Lithuanian). Vilnius: Valstybinis leidybos centras. ISBN 9986-09-018-0.
- Mockus, Antanas (2001). "Antanas Juška Veliuonoje". In Girininkienė, Vida (ed.). Veliuona (PDF) (in Lithuanian). Vilnius: Versmė. ISBN 978-9955-589-87-7.
- Mockus, Antanas (2003). Skrodenis, Stasys (ed.). Broliai Juškos: lietuvių liaudies dainų rinkėjai ir leidėjai (in Lithuanian). Vilnius: Tyto alba. ISBN 9986-16-275-0.
- "Skulptūra "Metraštininkas" Pušalote". Pasvalia (in Lithuanian). Pasvalio Mariaus Katiliškio viešoji biblioteka.
- Ramoškaitė, Živilė (2001). "Iš Antano Juškos užrašytų liaudies melodijų publikavimo istorijos". In Girininkienė, Vida (ed.). Veliuona (PDF) (in Lithuanian). Vilnius: Versmė. ISBN 978-9955-589-87-7.
- Rinkšelis, Žilvinas. "Senoji Vilkijos klebonija (dab. A. ir J. Juškų etninės kultūros muziejus) (Išlikęs, k.k.v.r. 10917)" (in Lithuanian). Architektūros ir urbanistikos tyrimų centras.
- Sakalauskienė, Vilija (2010). "Jono Jablonskio leksikografinė veikla". Kalbos kultūra (in Lithuanian). 83. ISSN 0130-2795.
- Sakalauskienė, Vilija (2018). "Antano Juškos lietuvių-lenkų kalbų žodynas – vienas pagrindinių Jono Jablonskio kartotekos Lietuvių kalbos žodynui medžiaga šaltinių" (PDF). Prace Bałtystyczne (in Lithuanian). 7. ISBN 978-83-65667-79-3.
- Sakalauskienė, Vilija; Sawaniewska-Mochowa, Zofia (December 2014). "Filologia a tożsamość. Dwugłos polsko‑litewski o ks. Antonim Juszkiewiczu, twórcy słowników przekładowych". Acta Baltico-Slavica (in Polish). 38: 108–125. doi:10.11649/abs.2014.001.
- Sliužinskas, Rimantas (2004). "Lietuvių tautosakos ir etninės muzikos publikacijos spaudos draudimo metais (1864-1904)" (PDF). Acta historica universitatis Klaipedensis (in Lithuanian). 10. ISSN 1392-4095.
- Subačius, Giedrius (1990). "Simono Daukanto žodynai". Lietuvių atgimimo istorijos studijos (in Lithuanian). 1 (Tautinės savimonės žadintojai: nuo asmens iki partijos). ISSN 1392-0391.
- Vaitekėnas, Paulius (6 July 2020). "Juškų muziejus Vilkijoje – eksponatai su kriminalo prieskoniu ir iš "Titaniko" ištraukta lietuviška knyga" (in Lithuanian). LRT.lt.
- Vanagas, Vytautas (4 December 2020) [2006]. "Antanas Juška". Visuotinė lietuvių enciklopedija (in Lithuanian). Mokslo ir enciklopedijų leidybos centras.
- "Lapkričio 1-oji". Lietuvos kalendorius (in Lithuanian). Versmė. October 2010.
- Zinkevičius, Zigmas (1990). Lietuvių kalbos istorija (in Lithuanian). Vol. IV. Mokslas. ISBN 5-420-00661-8.
