= Juška =

Juška or Juska is a surname. Notable people with the surname include:

- Andis Juška (born 1985), Latvian tennis player
- Antanas Juška (1819–1880), Roman Catholic pastor, lexicographer, and folklorist
- Egidijus Juška (born 1975), retired Lithuanian professional footballer
- Elise Juska, American novelist, short story writer, and essayist
- Gvidas Juška (born 1982), Lithuanian footballer
- Jane Juska (1933–2017), American author and retired English schoolteacher
- Jonas Juška (1815–1886), Lithuanian linguist
- Radek Juška (born 1993), Czech track and field athlete
- Romualdas Juška (born 1942), retired Lithuanian football player and referee

== See also ==
- Juska Savolainen (born 1983), Finnish footballer, who plays as midfielder
