= Jonas Juška =

Lithuanian teacher and linguist (1815–1886)

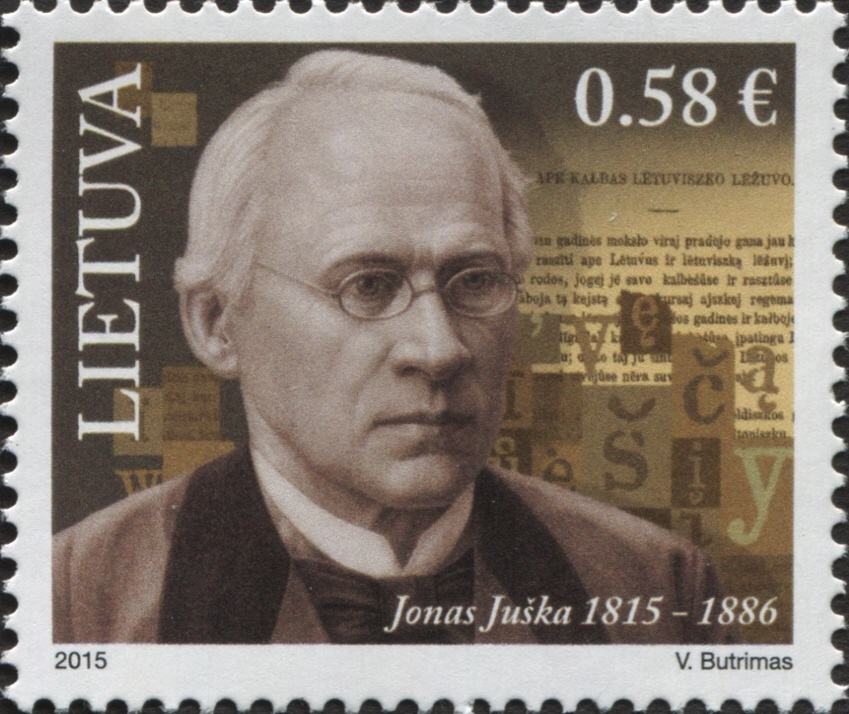
- Juška's portrait on a postal stamp issued in 2015
- Born: 18 June 1815; Dilbė, Russian Empire
- Died: 11 May 1886 (aged 70); Kazan, Russian Empire
- Resting place: Arskoe Cemetery (reburied in Veliuona in 1990)
- Other names: Jonas Juškevičius; Jan Juszkiewicz
- Education: Kharkiv University
- Occupations: Teacher, linguist
- Movement: Lithuanian National Revival
- Relatives: Brother Antanas Juška
- Awards: Order of St. Anna

Jonas Juška (Polish: Jan Juszkiewicz; 1815–1886) was a Lithuanian teacher and linguist. He studied the Lithuanian language and worked on publishing works by his brother the Catholic priest Antanas Juška.

Educated at Kražiai College and Kharkiv University, Juška as a Roman Catholic could not obtain a job in Lithuania and had to live in and work as a school teacher in various Russian cities (Mogilev, Novgorod, Saint Petersburg, Nizhny Novgorod, Yekaterinburg, Kazan). In 1852, Juška established contacts with professor Izmail Sreznevsky who introduced him to the Russian Academy of Sciences and encouraged Juška to study Lithuanian language. He produced several studies, including the first more detailed study of Lithuanian dialects in 1861. When his Lithuanian textbook was met with criticism in 1863, Juška stopped writing studies but continued to closely cooperate with his brother Antanas who was also interested in Lithuanian language and culture and spent his life collecting Lithuanian vocabulary, proverbs, and folk songs from the people. In 1867, Juška prepared the first booklet with 33 Lithuanian songs for publication. Due to the Lithuanian press ban, the Lithuanian words had to be transcribed in the Cyrillic script. In 1875, Juška moved to Kazan and became acquainted with professor Jan Baudouin de Courtenay. With his help, Juškas brothers managed to get a permit to print Lithuanian texts in the Latin alphabet at the University of Kazan and began preparing Antanas' works for publication in earnest. They also managed to get a special exemption from Tsar Alexander II of Russia to publish a wedding song collection at the Russian Academy of Sciences. Antanas died in 1880, and Jonas published four volumes of Lithuanian folk songs and a small part of the Lithuanian–Polish dictionary before his own death in 1886.

== Biography ==
=== Early life and research ===
Juška was born in the village of Dilbė near Žarėnai. His parents were landless Samogitian nobles – the family had to rent farms from others and frequently moved from one location to another. Juška had six brothers (two of them half-brothers) and helped them attain education – three became Catholic priests and the other three became doctors. He attended a Bernadine school in Dotnuva and was admitted to Kražiai College where he earned a living working as a superintendent in a students' dormitory. Jonas educated his younger brother Antanas and he was admitted to the third grade at Kražiai College. Jonas graduated with a gold medal in 1839. He sold the medal to support Antanas education. He could obtain a stipend to study at the University of Kazan but decided to wait a year hoping he could attend the University of Saint Petersburg. When those plans did not pan out, he enrolled into the History and Philology Faculty of Kharkiv University. Juška graduated in 1844. Though the university did not have a strong linguistic program, Juška became the first Lithuanian to receive specialized philological education in the Russian Empire.

As a Lithuanian he could not obtain a job in Lithuania due to Russification policies and for about four decades taught at various Russian educational institutions. He was first assigned to a gymnasium in Mogilev where he taught history and then to Novgorod (1851–1858) where he taught geography. In 1852, Juška established contacts with professor Izmail Sreznevsky and with his support and encouragement started more serious studies of the Lithuanian language. In 1858, he got an inspector position at a Cadet Corps school in Novgorod. However, the school closed in 1859 but he managed to transfer to a military school in Saint Petersburg. The pay at the military schools was better which was very important to Juška as he sponsored education of his two younger brothers. It also allowed him to establish closer contacts with various Russian linguists. Though brief, the Saint Petersburg period was the most productive period of Juška's research. To collect material for his studies, he traveled across Lithuania in 1858 and 1861 and collected at least a handful of songs. In 1862, Juška was reassigned to Kazan and participated in a four-member commission working on reforms of military schools. While working in various schools, Juška published several articles in the Russian press on the issues of education, including three articles in Russky Invalid in 1859–1860.

=== Uprising of 1863 ===
In 1863, Juška's brother Antanas was arrested and imprisoned for suspicions of distributing materials in support of the Uprising of 1863. Juška managed to get the Russian Academy of Sciences to send a letter to Nikolay Mikhailovich Muravyov, Governor of Kovno, asking for Antanas's release as he was working on a Lithuanian dictionary which was important to science. Antanas was released after nine-month imprisonment but the Tsarist authorities remained suspicious of Antanas.

In 1863, Juška completed his manuscript of a Lithuanian grammar book and submitted it to the Academy of Sciences for approval. The work was not well received by its reviewers and the text remained unpublished. The reviewers also found the work unoriginal and copying the book by August Schleicher. Such evaluation was particularly hurtful as Juška and his brother spent so much time and effort on collecting language examples from the people. In February 1864, Juška then sent a letter to Ivan Petrovich Kornilov, the newly appointed administrator of the Vilna Educational District, asking for a reassignment to Kovno Governorate and for help publishing his Lithuanian textbook. Mikhail Muravyov-Vilensky, Governor General of Vilna, implemented the Lithuanian press ban in 1864 – Lithuanian publications were forbidden if they were published using Latin alphabet but could be printed if they used the Cyrillic script. Therefore, Kornilov asked Juška to transcribe his grammar book in the Cyrillic script. Juška prepared a few pages of Lithuanian in Cyrillic (using a mix of Cyrillic and Latin characters as Cyrillic alone could not accommodate all needs of the Lithuanian pronunciation), but the government chose Stanisław Mikucki to draft the official guidelines. Juška's transfer request was refused due to Antanas' reputation. He was allowed to live in Vilnius and work on transcribing his grammar to the Cyrillic but he refused. After this failure, Juška did not write any new studies of the Lithuanian language but continued to help his brother Antanas to organize his collected information and publish it.

In May 1864, Juška became an inspector of a gymnasium in Nizhny Novgorod. However, in reaction to the failed Uprising of 1863, the Tsarist authorities issued a decree forbidding to employ Roman Catholics in administrative posts in 1865. Further, Okhrana investigated Juška for his help to members of the uprising who were deported to the interior of Russia and passed through Nizhny Novgorod. Therefore, he was reassigned as a Latin teacher to a gymnasium in Yekaterinburg in January 1867. The same year, Juška married Felicija Liutkevičiūtė, a niece of Antanas Mackevičius, one of the leaders of the Uprising of 1863. Theirs twins Antanina and Vytautas were born on 31 August 1869. From 1871 to 1875, he taught Greek. At some point, Juška received the Order of St. Anna (3rd class).

=== Publishing Antanas' works ===
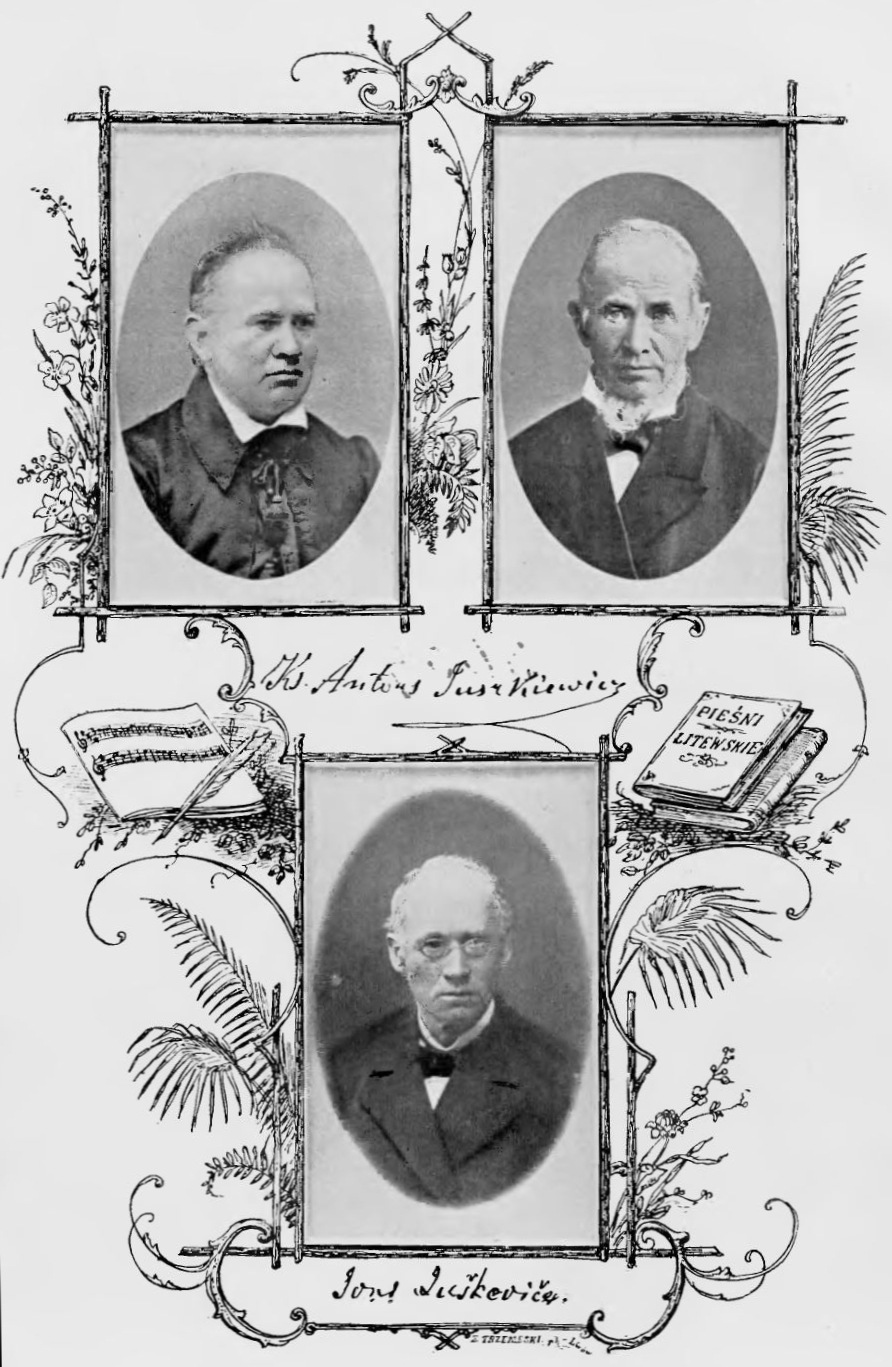
Portraits of brothers Juška (Antanas two to photos; Jonas at the bottom) in the collection of Lithuanian song melodies published in 1900

As years ticked by, Juška looked for ways to publish his and his brother's life-long work on Lithuanian folk song. In 1867, Juška prepared the first booklet with 33 Lithuanian songs and their translations to Russian. It was published by the Russian Academy of Sciences. Due to the Lithuanian press ban, the Lithuanian words had to be transcribed in the Cyrillic script. Juška adapted the Cyrillic script to Lithuanian phonetics by introducing new letters, but the publication was not well received in Lithuania due to the script. Due to such reaction, Juška delayed further publications.

In 1875, Juška transferred to the 3rd Gymnasium in Kazan where he continued to teach Latin. There he got acquainted with professor Jan Baudouin de Courtenay of Kazan University. With his support and encouragement, Juška and his brother began preparing their work for publication. Baudouin de Courtenay managed to get the university to publish the works in the Latin alphabet despite the Lithuanian press ban (the university had autonomy and was not subject to general laws of the censorship in the Russian Empire), however Juška had to pay the publication expenses that amounted to 606 Russian rubles for just the first volume of the song collection.

At the same time, Juška asked the Russian Academy of Sciences to publish a volume of wedding songs. The work was reviewed by Franz Anton Schiefner and Kazimieras Jaunius who highly praised its value and urged the academy to publish it. However, publishing Lithuanian text in the Latin alphabet became an issue particularly because the academy republished The Seasons by Kristijonas Donelaitis in 1865 which prompted the Ministry of National Education, by the order of the Tsar, to issue an order that Lithuanian works must only be published in the Cyrillic script. Therefore, Yakov Grot, vice-chair of the Academy of Sciences, had to petition Dmitry Tolstoy, the Minister of National Education, who in a consultation with Lev Makov, the Minister of Internal Affairs, petitioned Tsar Alexander II of Russia for a special exemption to publish the songs. The Tsar granted the exemption on 22 April 1880 on a condition that the book would not be distributed in the Northwestern Krai. Despite the prohibition, the book found its way to Lithuania via Lithuanian book smugglers. This precedent was later cited as one of the factors in lifting the Lithuanian press ban in 1904.

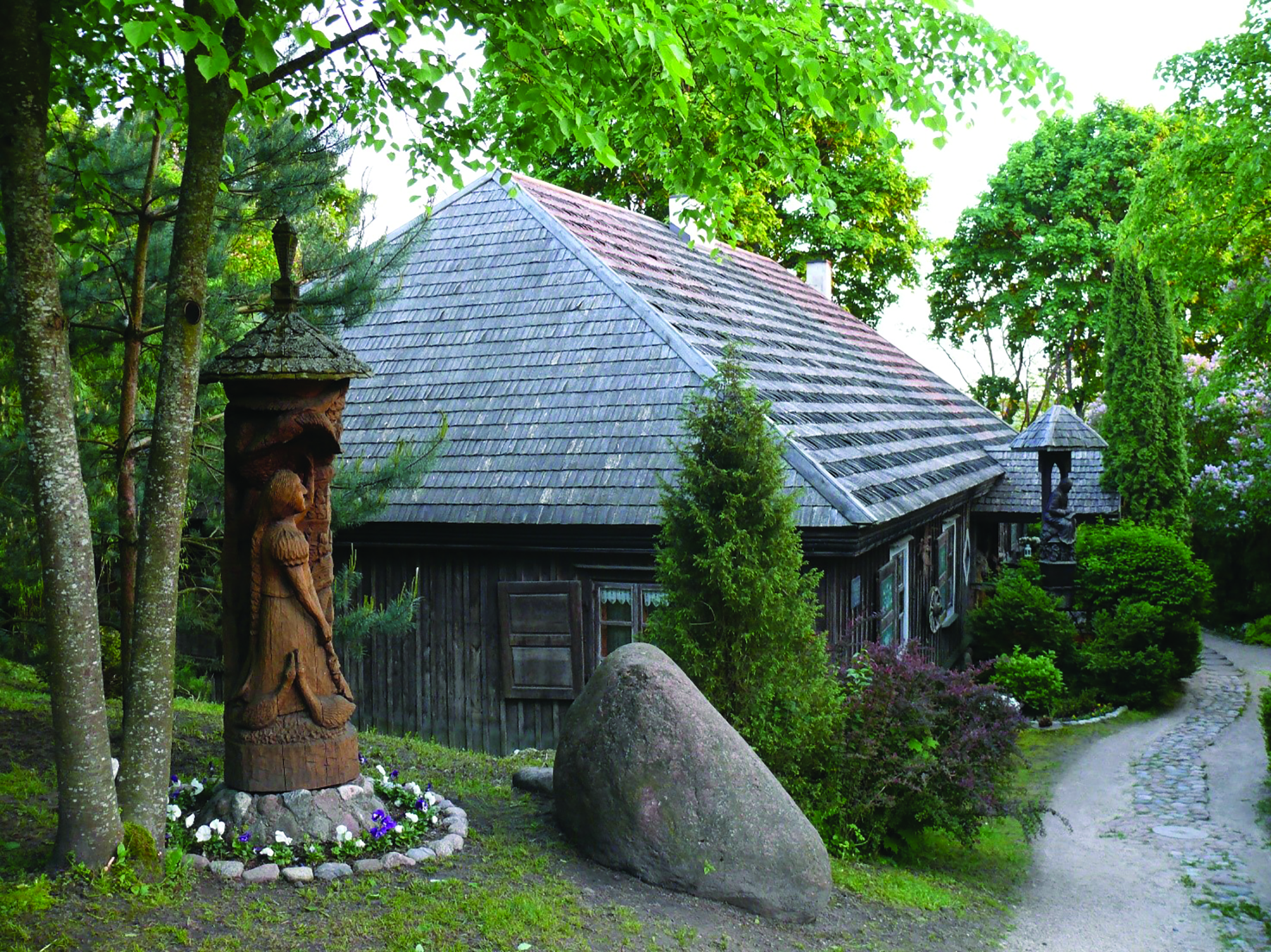
Juškas' museum in the former rectory in Vilkija

To expedite the editing process, Antanas moved to live with his brother in Kazan. He also sought better medical care for his illness, but after thirteen months of work in Kazan, Antanas Juška died on 1 November 1880. Juška continued to edit and publish Antanas' collections: three volumes of Lithuanian songs were published in Kazan in 1880–1882 and a volume with 1,100 wedding songs was published in Saint Petersburg in 1883. The next project was publishing Antanas' Lithuanian–Polish dictionary, but it was a painstakingly slow process as Juška needed to translate the dictionary to Russian and correct Polish from provincial vernacular to literary language. Further, Juška continued to work at the gymnasium (he was elected as the librarian in 1883 and appointed as the inspector in 1884). In October 1885, he suffered a heart attack and resigned from the school. He devoted the rest of his energy to the dictionary, but proofreading galley proofs was a very slow process – some pages required to be fixed five or six times. Between 1884 and spring 1886, only ten author's sheets (160 pages that did not encompass the full letter A) worth of the dictionary was published. Numerous other linguists continued the work and three volumes (up to the word kuokštuotis) of the dictionary were published in 1897, 1904, and 1922.

On 9 May 1886, Juška received a letter that the Academy of sciences entrusted further editing of the dictionary to Vatroslav Jagić. Likely the cause of such decision was inconsistencies in Juška's text. He was agitated and deeply disappointed by the decision. Two days later, on 11 May 1886, he suffered another attack and died. Both brothers were buried in a joint grave in the Arskoe Cemetery in Kazan; their remains were exhumed and reburied in the churchyard in Veliuona in November 1990. The same year, museum of Lithuanian ethnic culture named after brothers Juškas was established in the former rectory in Vilkija where Antanas briefly worked in 1862–1864.

== Research ==
Juška's brother Antanas became a Catholic priest. He became interested in Lithuanian language and started collecting Lithuanian words, idioms, proverbs, songs, etc. Jonas Juška also became interested in the language but took a more theoretical approach to his studies. The two brothers closely cooperated in their studies; Jonas frequently visited Antanas in Lithuania during summer vacations. Sometimes it is difficult to determine which manuscript was written by which brother.

Juška's studies were encouraged by professor Izmail Sreznevsky who established contacts with Juška in 1852. Sreznevsky did not study the Lithuanian language himself but supported and promoted its research. At the time, Russian and German linguists became more interested in the Lithuanian language due to its archaic features and similarity to Sanskrit. They needed a native Lithuanian who could help them study the language. In 1853, Sreznevsky coordinated efforts of the Russian Academy of Sciences to send a Lithuanian linguist on a three-year mission to study and describe Lithuanian dialects. Stanisław Mikucki was chosen for the mission but he did not produce the expected studies. Sreznevsky then placed hopes with Juška.

=== Published works ===
In 1856, Sreznevsky asked Juška to write a scholarly review of the newly published Lithuanian language textbook by August Schleicher. The work was published as a separate brochure by the Russian Academy of Sciences in 1857. In this work Juška outlined his fundamental view that the Lithuanian language needs to be studied not from published material but from the untapped riches of the living language spoken by villagers.

In 1861, the Russian Academy of Sciences published Juška's study on the Lithuanian dialects in Russian and Lithuanian. It was published in the society's journal and as a separate booklet. It was the first study of Lithuanian dialects in Lithuanian. Living far away from Lithuania and visiting only during the summer vacations, Juška could not study the dialects in detail which made his study rather superficial. Yet the study was a significant step in the emerging research on the Lithuanian. He identified four major dialects – Samogitian, Prussian Lithuanian, Ariogala (he grew up nearby; the area encompassed most of present-day areas of western Aukštaitian dialect), and eastern Lithuanian. The dialect descriptions were not in depth, sometimes missing key features and entirely failing to address pitch accents or accentuation.

=== Unpublished works ===
In 1855, Juška compiled a brief dictionary of words that were similar in Lithuanian and Sanskrit and sent it to Sreznevsky in early 1856. He based his work on research by Alexander Hilferding which was not very strong. Juška also knew little of Sanskrit, therefore, many words pairs identified by Juška were unrelated. Nevertheless, Juška was the first Lithuanian linguist to research the relationship between Lithuanian and Sanskrit.

Around 1856, Juška began working on a dictionary of Lithuanian roots. It was supposed to be a comparative dictionary of Lithuanian, Latvian, and Prussian roots with Slavic equivalents. He worked on this project for about ten years but it remained unfinished. It was an ambitious and virtually impossible project due to the lack of the prior research into the subject.

In 1863, Juška completed a Lithuanian grammar textbook and submitted it to the Academy of Sciences for approval. The work was evaluated by Otto von Böhtlingk, Oskar Johann Wiedemann, and Franz Anton Schiefner. They found the textbook too primitive for academics but too complicated for an average person. They also found the work unoriginal and copying the textbook by August Schleicher. Lithuanian researchers believe that such evaluation was too harsh and that the grammar is superior to many other available grammars of the time in its accuracy and summary of the key Lithuanian language rules. It appears that in this work Juška was the first to use Lithuanian terms galūnė (case ending), skaitvardis (numeral), skiemuo (syllable) that are commonly used in modern Lithuanian.

Around 1863, Juška also wrote a textbook of Lithuanian for the middle schools. It was supposed to be both in Lithuanian and Russian. The book also included sample reading texts for students to practice on. These texts included excerpts from works by Kristijonas Donelaitis, Simonas Daukantas, Motiejus Valančius, two fairytales, seven Lithuanian folk songs, 22 fables (three of them by Simonas Stanevičius), and 40 proverbs.

Juška also worked on a Lithuanian–Russian dictionary. However, he did not finish it (it was written up to the word marnastis).

=== Orthography ===
At the time, Lithuanian did not have a standardized spelling. In his review of Schleicher's book, Juška urged to use the Samogitian dialect as the basis for the standard Lithuanian as he perceived it as purer and more archaic. After Schleicher rebuffed the notion in his response, Juška supported the use of both Samogitian and Aukštaitian dialects but using the same spelling rules. That could be achieved only if the same character was read and understood differently by speakers of Samogitian and Aukštaitian but did not develop a more comprehensive proposal how to achieve this in practice. Juška wrote mainly in his native Ariogala (western Aukštaitian) dialect, but his writings also have features of Prussian Lithuanian (influence of Schleicher, particularly in earlier works) and sporadic elements of Samogitian dialects.

Juška suggested several reforms of Lithuanian spelling. Instead of widely used Polish sz and cz, he used š and č that are used in modern Lithuanian. However, he was not consistent and sometimes used ś, ṡ, or even ʃ. He also suggested using v instead of w and l instead of ł. He argued for both changes because one letter is easier and quicker to use than two. He rejected the use of i to indicate soft sounds as it is ambiguous and instead suggested using the acute accent on consonants, but sometimes used dotless i or even j. He replaced y with ï to mark long i. He defended the use of aj, ej, uj instead of the modern diphthongs ai, ei, ui. He used ë instead of diphthong ie (influence of Schleicher) for a brief time and ů instead of uo which was used by other writers at the time as a tool to accommodate readers of different dialects.

== Bibliography ==
- Baškienė, Rasa (8 January 2014). "Broliai Juškos – degę meile lietuvių kalbai…" (in Lithuanian). Artuma via Bernardinai.lt.
- Baudouin de Courtenay, Jan (2001) [1886]. "Lietuvių mokslininkas Jonas Juškevičius". In Girininkienė, Vida (ed.). Veliuona (PDF) (in Lithuanian). Translated by Judžentis, Artūras. Vilnius: Versmė. ISBN 978-9955-589-87-7.
- Ibianska, Vanda (29 November 2019). Mažai žinomi mūsų šviesuoliai. Antanas ir Jonas Juškos (in Lithuanian). Artuma via Bernardinai.lt.
- Jonikas, Petras (1972). "Juška (Juškevičius), Jonas". Encyclopedia Lituanica. Vol. II. Boston, MA: Jonas Kapočius. LCCN 74-114275.
- Merkys, Vytautas (1994). Knygnešių laikai 1864–1904 (in Lithuanian). Vilnius: Valstybinis leidybos centras. ISBN 9986-09-018-0.
- Mockus, Antanas (2003). Skrodenis, Stasys (ed.). Broliai Juškos: lietuvių liaudies dainų rinkėjai ir leidėjai (in Lithuanian). Vilnius: Tyto alba. ISBN 9986-16-275-0.
- Rinkšelis, Žilvinas. "Senoji Vilkijos klebonija (dab. A. ir J. Juškų etninės kultūros muziejus) (Išlikęs, k.k.v.r. 10917)" (in Lithuanian). Kauno technologijos universiteto Architektūros ir statybos instituto Mokslo centras Architektūros ir urbanistikos tyrimų centras.
- Sabaliauskas, Algirdas (19 November 2018) [2006]. "Jonas Juška". Visuotinė lietuvių enciklopedija (in Lithuanian). Mokslo ir enciklopedijų leidybos centras.
- Zinkevičius, Zigmas (1990). Lietuvių kalbos istorija (in Lithuanian). Vol. IV. Mokslas. ISBN 5-420-00661-8.
