= Pavasarininkai =

- Formation: 1912
- Founded at: Kaunas, Lithuania
- Dissolved: 1940
- Type: Lithuanian Catholic Youth Organization
- Members: Jonas Totoraitis; Povilas Dogelis (90,000+ (1940))

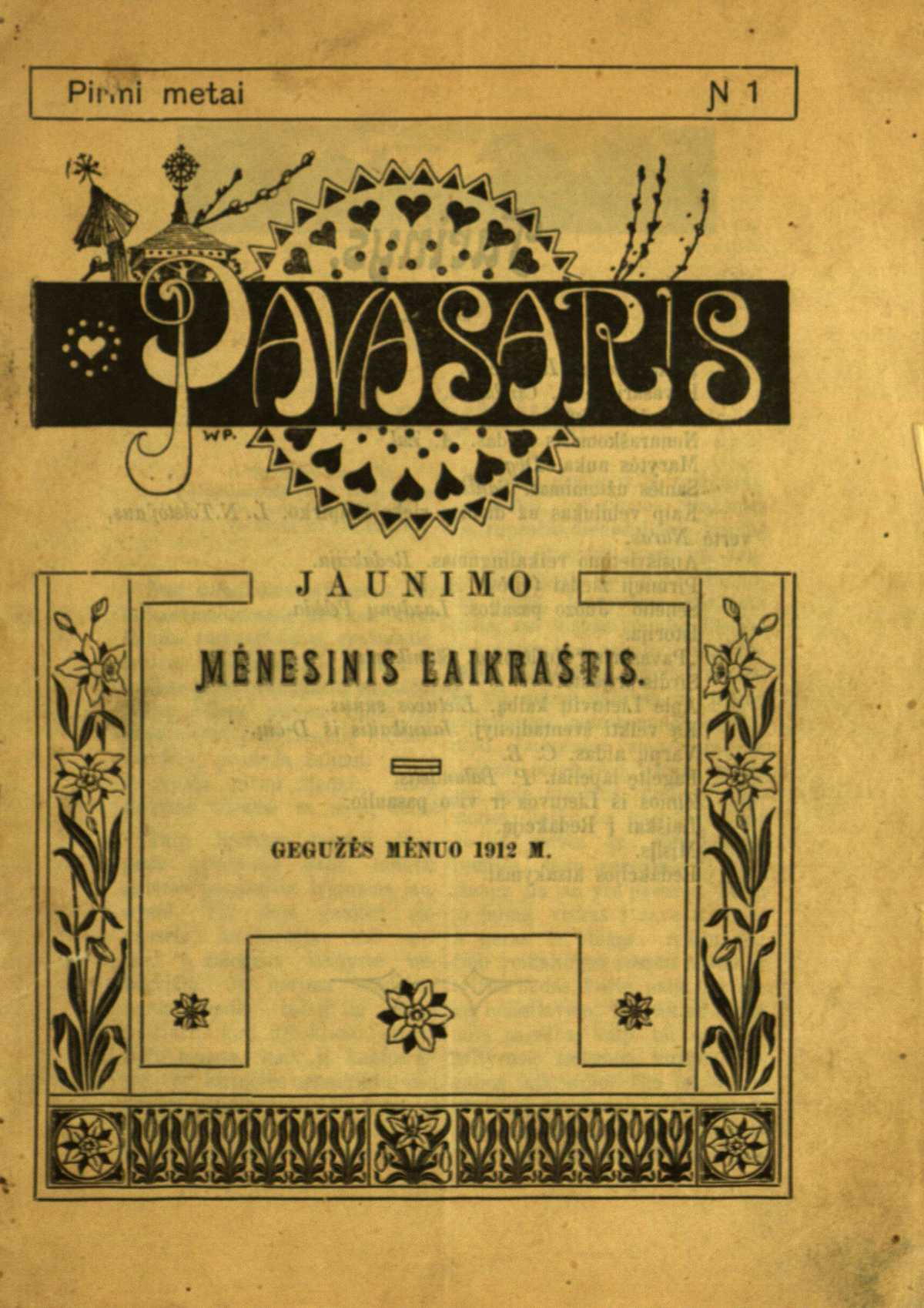
Cover page of the first issue of Pavasaris in May 1912

Pavasarininkai was the informal name for members of Lithuanian Catholic Youth Federation "Spring" (Lithuanian: Lietuvių katalikų jaunimo federacija „Pavasaris“), a Lithuanian Catholic youth organization. It was active from 1912 until the Soviet occupation of Lithuania in 1940. It grew from various informal groups established around the Pavasaris magazine, first published in May 1912. It was based in Kaunas, but most members were active in various rural locations across Lithuania. With more than 90,000 members and 1,200 groups in 1940, it was one of the largest and most popular organizations in interwar Lithuania. Its motto was "For God and Fatherland" and it organized various events (conferences, lectures, spiritual exercises, concerts, song festivals, theater performances, sports competitions, etc.) to educate the youth in the Catholic spirit and develop their national pride. Pavasarininkai were supported by local clergy and the Catholic hierarchy but were frowned upon by the authoritarian regime of President Antanas Smetona. It was similar to and closely cooperated with the Catholic Youth Federation Ateitis.

== History ==
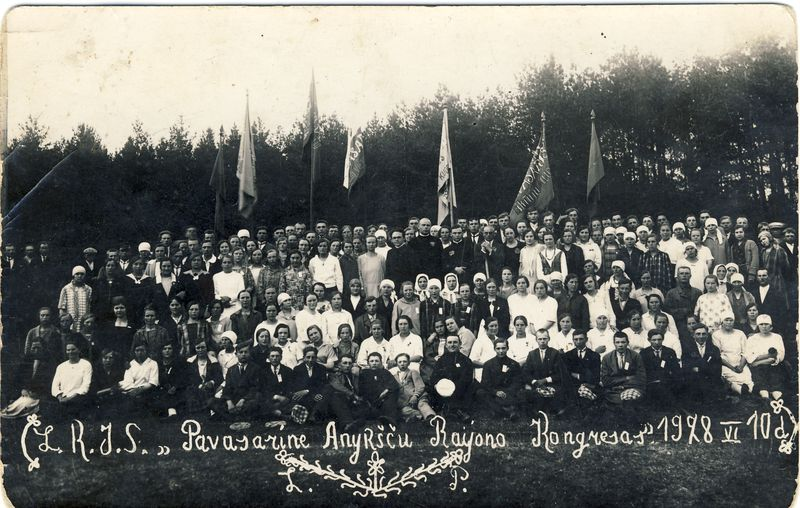
Congress of Anykščiai District in 1928

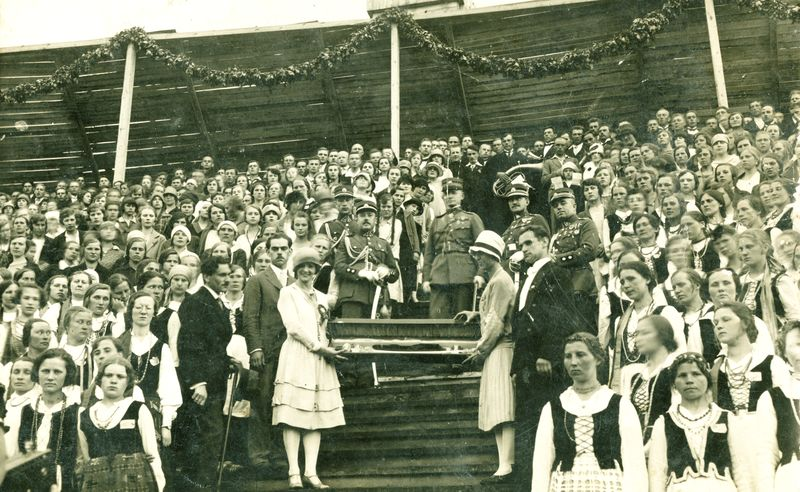
Closing ceremony of folk art exhibition in Kaunas in 1930

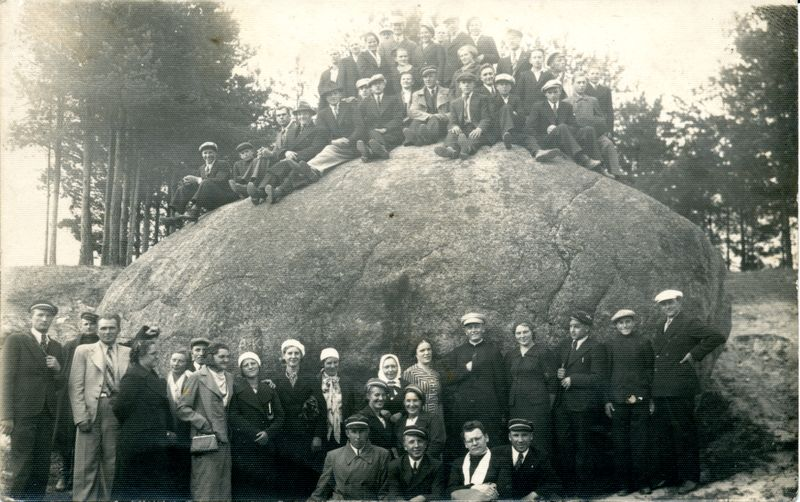
Excursion of pavasarininkai at Puntukas

=== Before World War I ===
The first secret groups were organized in 1912 around the Pavasaris magazine. In May 1911, a group of 29 teachers of the Saulė Society gathered at the residence of Povilas Dogelis in Kaunas and decided to establish a Union of Lithuanian Catholic Teachers. A year later this organization began publishing Pavasaris – the first Lithuanian-language periodical dedicated to Lithuanian youth. Various periodicals had supplements for the youth (Jaunimas by Lietuvos ūkininkas, Ateitis by Draugija, Aušrinė by Lietuvos žinios, Šaltinėlis by Šaltinis), but there was no separate periodical. Pavasaris was a monthly illustrated magazine, first published in May 1912 at the printing press of Saliamonas Banaitis. It devoted most of its attention to issues of morality, religion, self-education, and urged its readers to protect the Catholic values, treasure the Lithuanian language, develop Lithuanian national consciousness, and join Lithuanian societies and organizations. It also published articles on popular science (e.g. explaining solar eclipses), history of Lithuania, brief mentions of world events, jokes and riddles. It ceased publication in July 1914 due to World War I, but was reestablished in 1918 and continued to be published by pavasarininkai until 1940.

Pavasaris groups were promoted by priests Jonas Totoraitis and Povilas Dogelis, and organized by local clergy, teachers, members of other Lithuanian societies (such as Žiburys or the Lithuanian Catholic Teetotalism Society). By 1914, Pavasaris had groups in Marijampolė, Miroslavas, Radviliškis, Sejny, Surviliškis, Šeduva, Šiauliai, Vabalninkas, Valkininkai, Varėna. In 1914, Pavasaris members organized the first conference at the home of Maironis in Kaunas in 1914. At the time, it was an illegal gathering attended by 17 people, including Pranas Dovydaitis. They adopted the statute of Pavasaris organization, but further developments were interrupted by World War I. The society became inactive.

=== Post-war ===
The first Pavasaris groups were reestablished in 1916 in Vilnius. The organization recovered and expanded after Lithuania declared independence in February 1918. It became an official organization and organized its first legal conference in Kaunas in September 1919, attended by 120 people. It adopted the official name of the Lithuanian Catholic Youth Union Pavasaris (Lithuanian: Lietuvių katalikų jaunimo sąjunga Pavasaris). Other annual conferences were organized in 1920–1925, 1927–1928, and 1938. The conferences were accompanied by various other events. For example, in 1924, Pavasaris held a song festival attended by 20 choirs and 970 singers. In 1925, pavasarininkai's chairman Juozas Eretas travelled to the 28th International Eucharistic Congress in Chicago and established contacts with the Knights of Lithuania. The anniversary conference in July 1927 (15 years since establishment) was particularly large; it was opened by President Antanas Smetona and was attended by guests from the Knights of Lithuania. It was accompanied by a sports competition (220 athletes who beat two Lithuanian records), an exhibition of folk art (2,000 exhibits), and a parade from the Town Hall to St. Michael the Archangel Church that featured floats (a novelty in Lithuania). In total, it was attended by about 11,000 people; 2,500 of them were members of choirs.

However, the relationship between Pavasarininkai and the authoritarian regime of President Smetona was not friendly. The regime saw the Lithuanian Christian Democratic Party and various Catholic organizations as its opponents and limited their activities. For example, it issued a secret order not to admit pavasarininkai to Kaunas War School and would not issue permits for their national conferences. Rumors had it that Pavasaris' chairman Juozas Eretas who was from Switzerland, resigned in 1928 to prevent complaints that pavasarininkai were led by a non-Lithuanian and not due to poor health as officially claimed. In 1932, the government did not grant a permit for the congress to mark the 20th anniversary of Pavasaris. Instead, groups organized regional gatherings and conferences. The one in Marijampolė featured speeches by Pranas Dovydaitis, Juozas Eretas, and Juozas Leimonas, in which they protested against various government restrictions. All three received three-month prison sentences for "inciting locals against the government."

In 1928, Pavasarininkai received a letter from Pope Pius XI encouraging their activities. In 1933, it was reorganized into a federation that united separate societies of men, women, and youth (ages 13–16). Local groups were also split by gender. The youth union was dropped in 1937. A separate organization, Vyčiai (Knights) for urban Catholic youth was merged into Pavasaris in 1935. The 25th-anniversary conference in June 1938 (delayed a year due to issues obtaining permits) was attended by as many as 45,000 people, including about 7,000 sports competitors and 6,000 singers in 247 choirs.

The organization was abolished after the Soviet occupation in June 1940. The Soviets persecuted the organization: its chairman Juozas Leimonas was arrested already in July 1940. Three members were killed in the Rainiai massacre and two in the Chervyen massacre. Pavasarininkai also joined the anti-Soviet June Uprising. As a result, many items related to Pavasarininkai were destroyed by the Soviet regime. For example, ten flags of local pavasarininkai groups at the Samogitian Museum "Alka" were slated for destruction, but were secretly preserved by museum employees.

== Activities ==
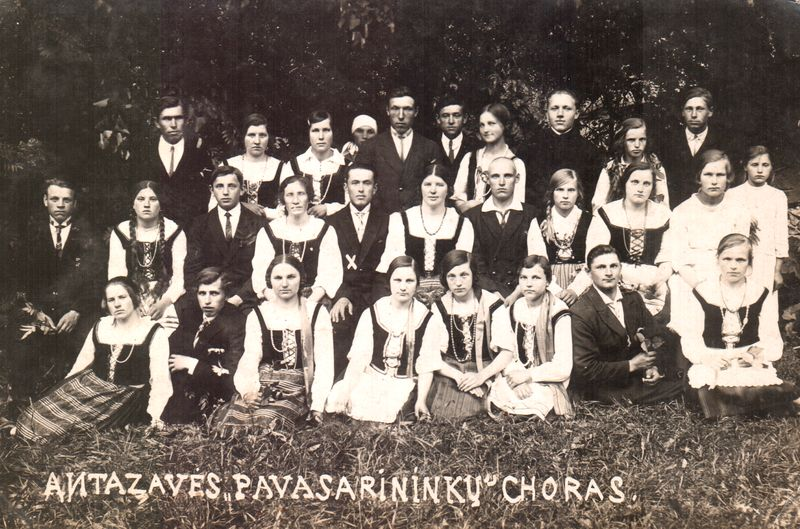
Pavasaris choir of Antazavė

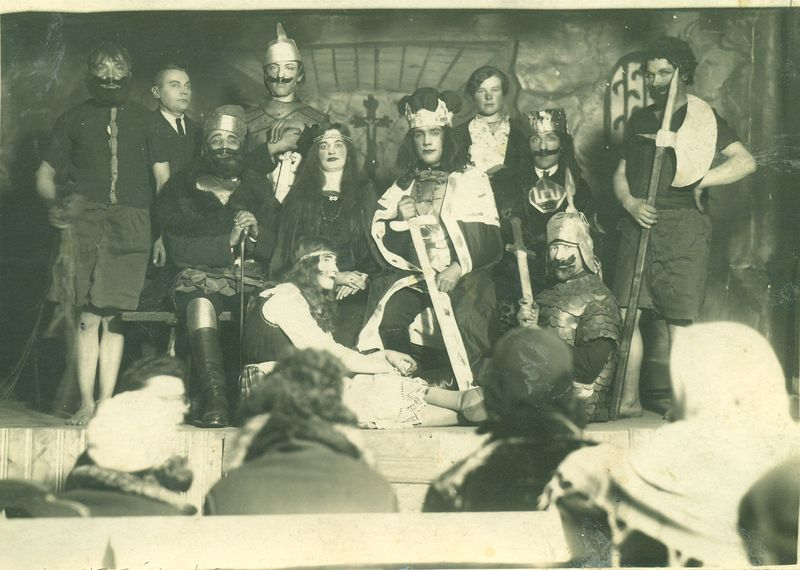
Pavasarininkai performing a play about Grand Duke Vytautas the Great

Members of Pavasaris organized various events, including local, regional, and national conferences, concerts, theater performances, song festivals, lectures (many on moral and Catholic virtues), exhibitions of folk art, sport competitions. Its sports section was a member of the Lithuanian Federation of Gymnastics and Sports (Lithuanian: Lietuvos gimnastikos ir sporto federacija or LGSF). As good Catholics, they also participated in various religious events. Pavasarininkai had their patron saints and celebrated their feast days: Saint George for men, Thérèse of Lisieux for women, and Aloysius Gonzaga for the youth. Pavasarininkai instituted annual spiritual exercises (similar to Spiritual Exercises of Ignatius of Loyola) specifically adapted to youth. In 1928, pavasarininkai had about 600 groups with 30,000 members who held 15,639 meetings, 487 spiritual exercises, 9,117 lectures, and 123 courses. In 1930–1939, the women's section organized more than 30,000 lectures, 12,573 lectures during teetotalism weeks, and 764 mock trials for those abusing alcohol.

They organized local choirs, orchestras, and libraries (there were 200 such libraries in 1923 and 518 in 1929). Pavasarinkai maintained abandoned graves (they were the first to care for the graves of soldiers who perished during the Lithuanian Wars of Independence), collected examples of folklore and antiques (some of which later ended up at various Lithuanian museums). Pavasarininkai encouraged people to read and write in Lithuanian, buy Lithuanian products, and learn Lithuanian songs, fairy tales, legends, and other folklore. They also built various memorial crosses and other monuments. For example, they built a statue of Aloysius Gonzaga by Bernardas Bučas in Panevėžys in 1933. Many of these were destroyed during the Soviet era, but a few survived or have been reconstructed since 1990. In Kaunas, Pavasaris established a folk high school (named after bishop Motiejus Valančius) and a gymnasium for adults. Pavasaris published magazines Pavasaris (Spring, 1912–1915 and 1918–1940), Jaunimo vadas (Leader of Youth, 1923–1940, targeted leaders of pavasarininkai), Vyrų žygiai (Feats of Men, 1936–1937), and Liepsnos (Flames, 1937–1940, for the women's section).

Some members of Pavasaris joined the Lithuanian Army during the Lithuanian Wars of Independence. The first volunteer killed in action, Povilas Lukšys, was a member of Pavasaris. One of them, private Kostas Skinulis, was killed in August 1919 in the Lithuanian–Soviet War but his slogan Life does not matter if Fatherland is again enslaved by the enemies (Lithuanian: Niekai gyvybė, jeigu Tėvynė vėl būtų priešų pavergta) became a popular rallying cry among Lithuanian soldiers.

== Insignia ==
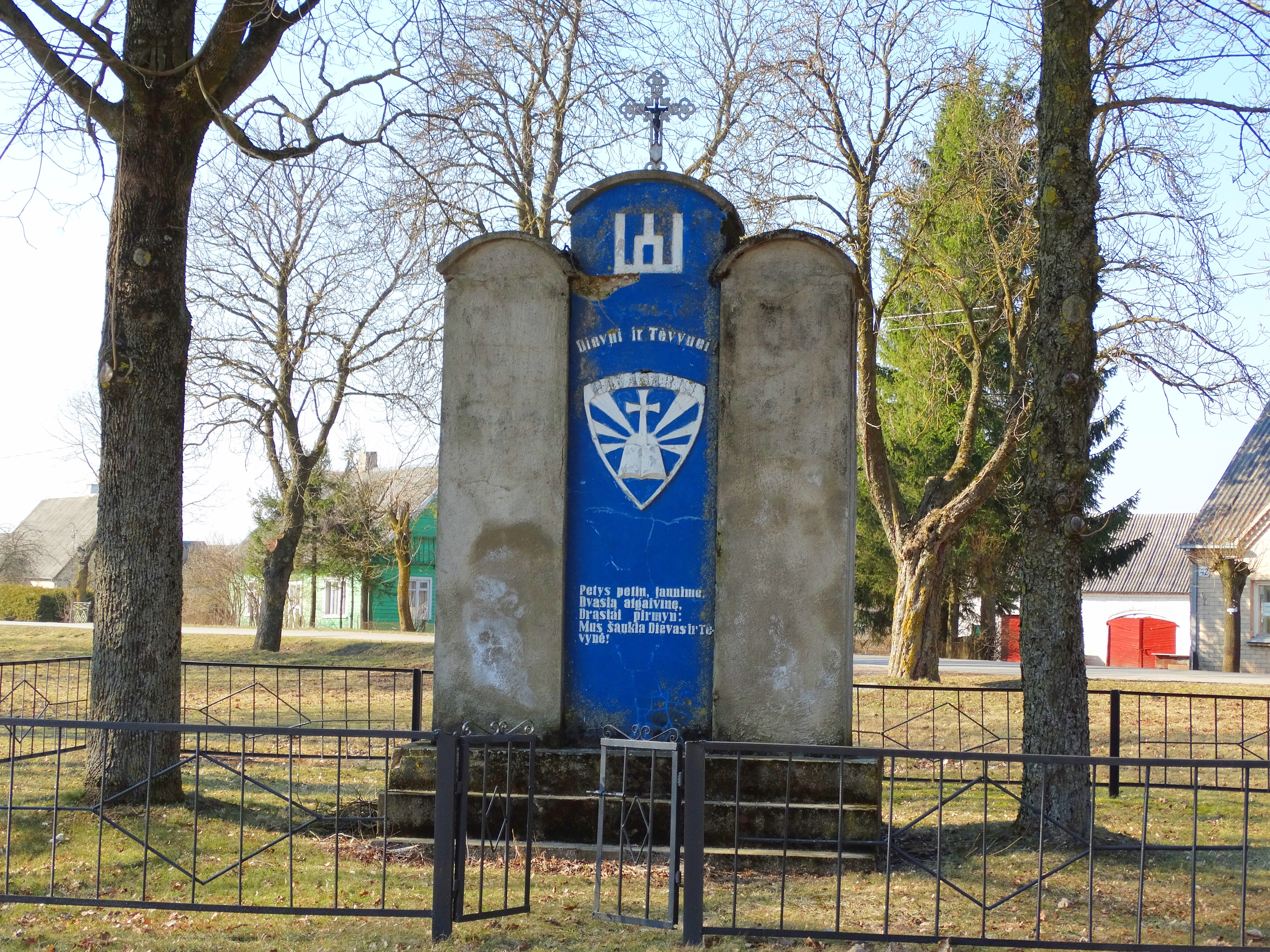
Monument built by Pavasarininkai in Šiupyliai with their emblem and motto

Pavasarininkai had blue uniforms. As an anthem, they used Lietuva brangi (Dear Lithuania) by Maironis and, since 1922, Sukruskime, broliai ir sesės, drauge (Let's Create, Brothers and Sisters, Together) by Kazimieras Žitkus. Their flag was light blue with a rising sun, an opened book, a kanklės, and a cross.

Pavasaris produced pins for its members. The first pins were manufactured in Germany in July–August 1920 and March 1921. They depicted kanklės (symbol of love for music), a cross (symbol of Catholicism), an opened book (symbol of youth and studies), a sun and star (symbol of the search for knowledge and light), rue (symbol of innocence and purity) on a blue enamel background. (Note: Image can be seen at "1918–1940 m. Lietuvos organizacijų ženkleliai iš Algimanto Astiko kolekcijos" (in Lithuanian). Lietuvos nacionalinis muziejus. June 2016.) In 1925, Pavasaris started producing new pins that became mandatory for members to wear at different events. These pins were produced in Switzerland by Huguenin Frères & Co and in Lithuania by a workshop established to support disabled war veterans. They were smaller and simpler both in symbolism (no more kanklės or rue) and in material (no more enamel). (Note: Image can be seen at "1918–1940 m. Lietuvos organizacijų ženkleliai iš Algimanto Astiko kolekcijos" (in Lithuanian). Lietuvos nacionalinis muziejus. June 2016.) Mečislovas Reinys interpreted the heart-shaped pin to symbolize both the goodness of people and that symbols engraved on the pin should similarly be engraved as corresponding values in pavasarininkai hearts.

The pins were redesigned in 1935 after the organization split into sections based on gender. All pins were shaped as an upside-down shield and had a dark blue enamel background. Women's pins featured a rising golden sun with rays, a blue cross in the middle ray, and a rue branch in the middle of the sun. Men's pin featured a silver Saint George and the Dragon. The youth pin featured a stylized tulip with the Columns of Gediminas and a cross underneath. The tulip was gold for girls and silver for boys. Pavasaris also produced other pins for special occasions – participants of the song festivals in 1924 and 1927, anniversary conferences in 1938, or those who recruited a sufficient number of new subscribers to Pavasaris magazine in 1934. Some of these pins were made of gold, silver, or gilded metals.

== Members ==
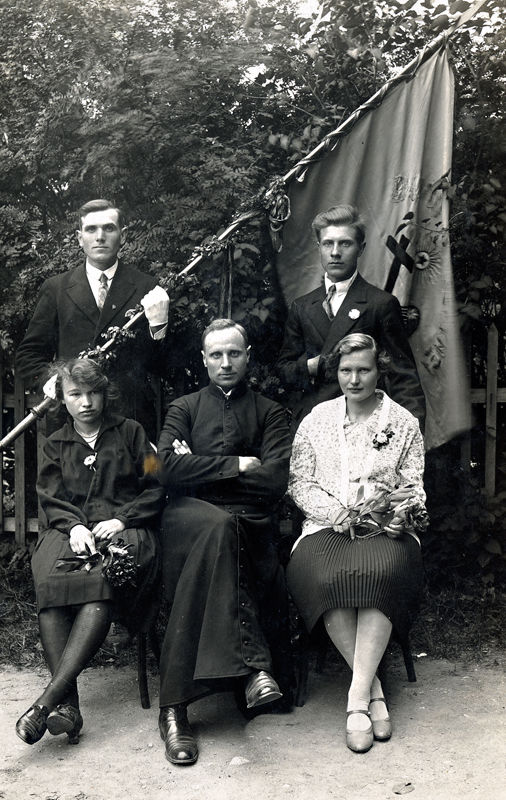
Board members a group in Darbėnai with a local priest and Pavasaris flag

Members of Pavasaris could only be unmarried people ages 15 to 40. The organization was mostly active through local groups called kuopa, 'company', often organized in a single rural location. Local priests supported such groups and acted as their spiritual leaders. These groups were grouped into districts and regions, established in 1923–1924. There were 85 groups and 6,800 members in 1919. In 1925, there were 469 groups divided into 28 districts and four regions based on the ethnographic regions of Lithuania. In 1927, the regions were reorganized to match up with the newly established dioceses of Kaunas, Kaišiadorys, Panevėžys, Telšiai, and Vilkaviškis. Each diocese had a priest dedicated to youth organizations. In 1929, there were 648 groups and a total of about 56,000 members. In 1933, the groups started splitting into separate women's and men's branches. In that year, there were 418 women groups, 329 men groups, and 287 mixed groups. In 1940, there were more than 90,000 members in 615 women and 618 men groups.

=== Leaders ===
The organization was chaired by:

- Bronius Stosiūnas (1918)
- Domas Kurtinaitis (1919)
- Edvardas Misevičius (1920)
- Juozas Eretas (1922–1928)
- Juozas Leimonas (1928–1940)
