= Elise Juska =

American novelist and essayist

Elise Juska is an American novelist, short story writer, and essayist. She was the founding director of the undergraduate creative writing program at the University of the Arts in Philadelphia.

== Career and education ==
Juska is a graduate of Bowdoin College and the graduate writing program at the University of New Hampshire. She is the author of the novels Reunion, The Blessings, and If We Had Known.

Reunion, about three friends who return to their delayed 25th college reunion one year after the COVID-19 pandemic, was published by HarperCollins in May 2024. It was selected as an Editors' Choice by the New York Times, named one of People Magazine's "Best New Books", and received endorsements from New York Times bestselling authors Liz Moore and Mary Beth Keane.

The Blessings, released by Grand Central Publishing in 2014, which was selected for the Barnes & Noble Discover Great New Writers Series, the May 2014 LibraryReads list, and Entertainment Weekly's "Must List." The Philadelphia Inquirer named the novel one of the 10 Best Books of 2014, describing it as: "[A] bighearted novel... Juska's moving, multifaceted portrait of the Blessing family gleams like a jewel."

If We Had Known was released by Grand Central Publishing in April 2018. Inspired by the shooting at Virginia Tech, the story is about an English professor who, after a shooting at her local mall, realizes that the gunman was her former student and wrote an essay for her class offering clues to his violent nature she might have missed.

Juska's short stories and essays have appeared in Ploughshares, The Gettysburg Review, The Missouri Review, The Millions, Good Housekeeping, The Hudson Review, Prairie Schooner, Harvard Review, and numerous other publications.

== Awards and honors ==
Juska was the 2013 winner of the Alice Hoffman Prize for Fiction from Ploughshares and her short stories have been honored by the Best American Short Stories and Pushcart Prize: Best of the Small Presses series. From the University of the Arts, she received the 2014 Lindback Award for Distinguished Teaching.
