= Pušalotas =

- Village
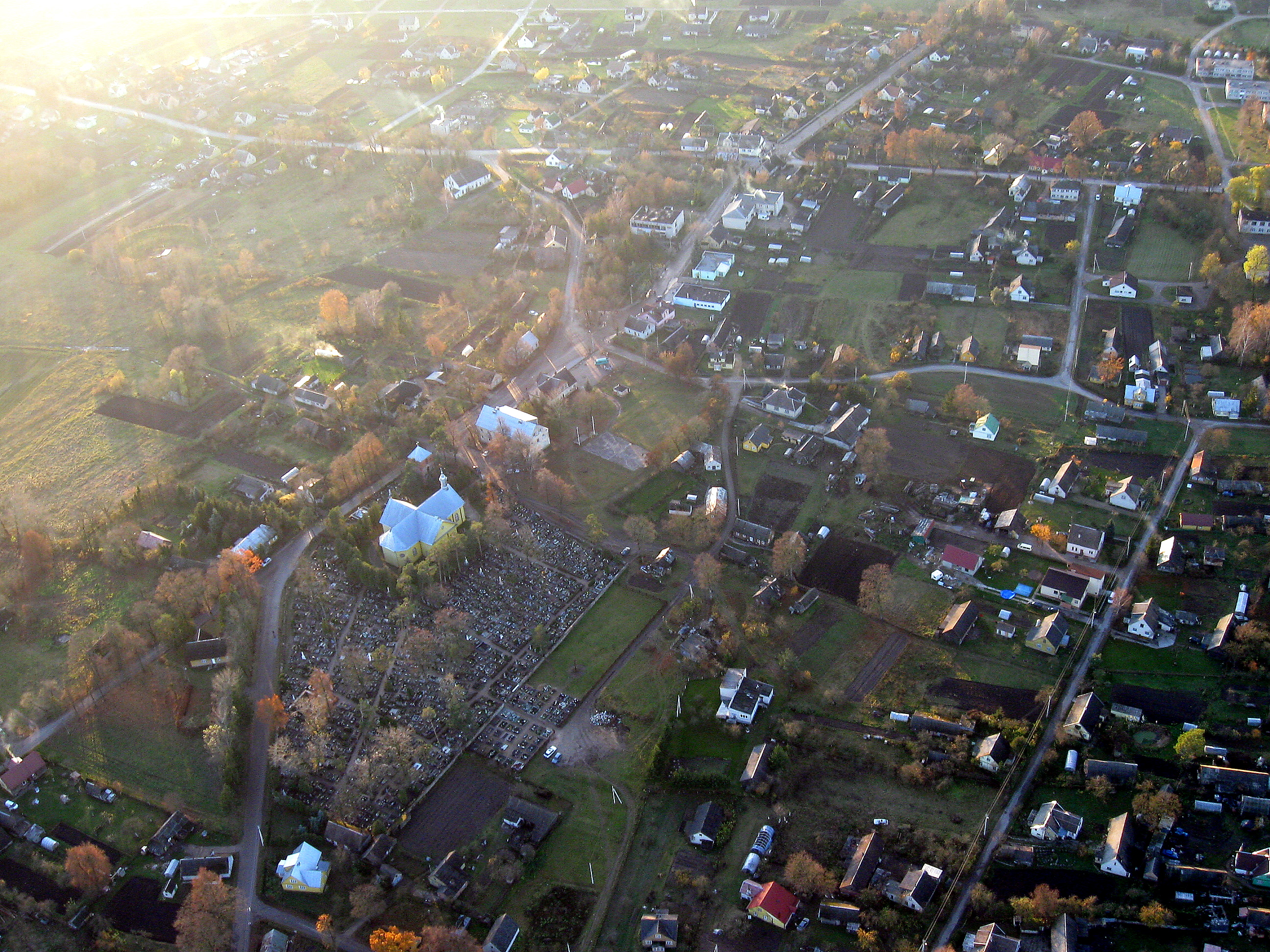

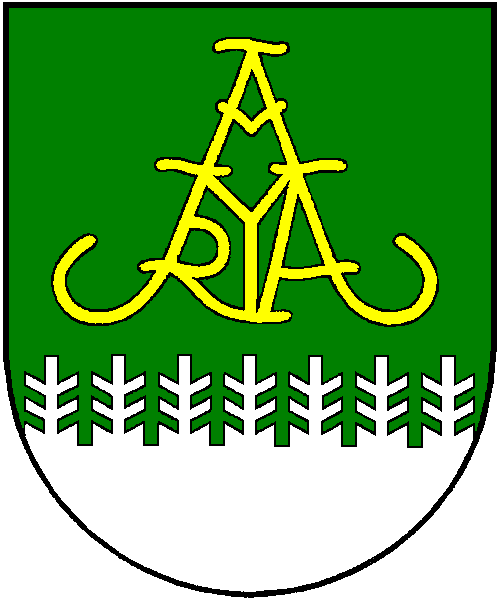
- Coat of arms

- Location within Lithuania
- Coordinates: 55°56′00″N 24°14′40″E
- Country: Lithuania
- County: Panevėžys County

Population (2011)
  - Total: 692
- Time zone: UTC+2 (EET)
  - Summer (DST): UTC+3 (EEST)

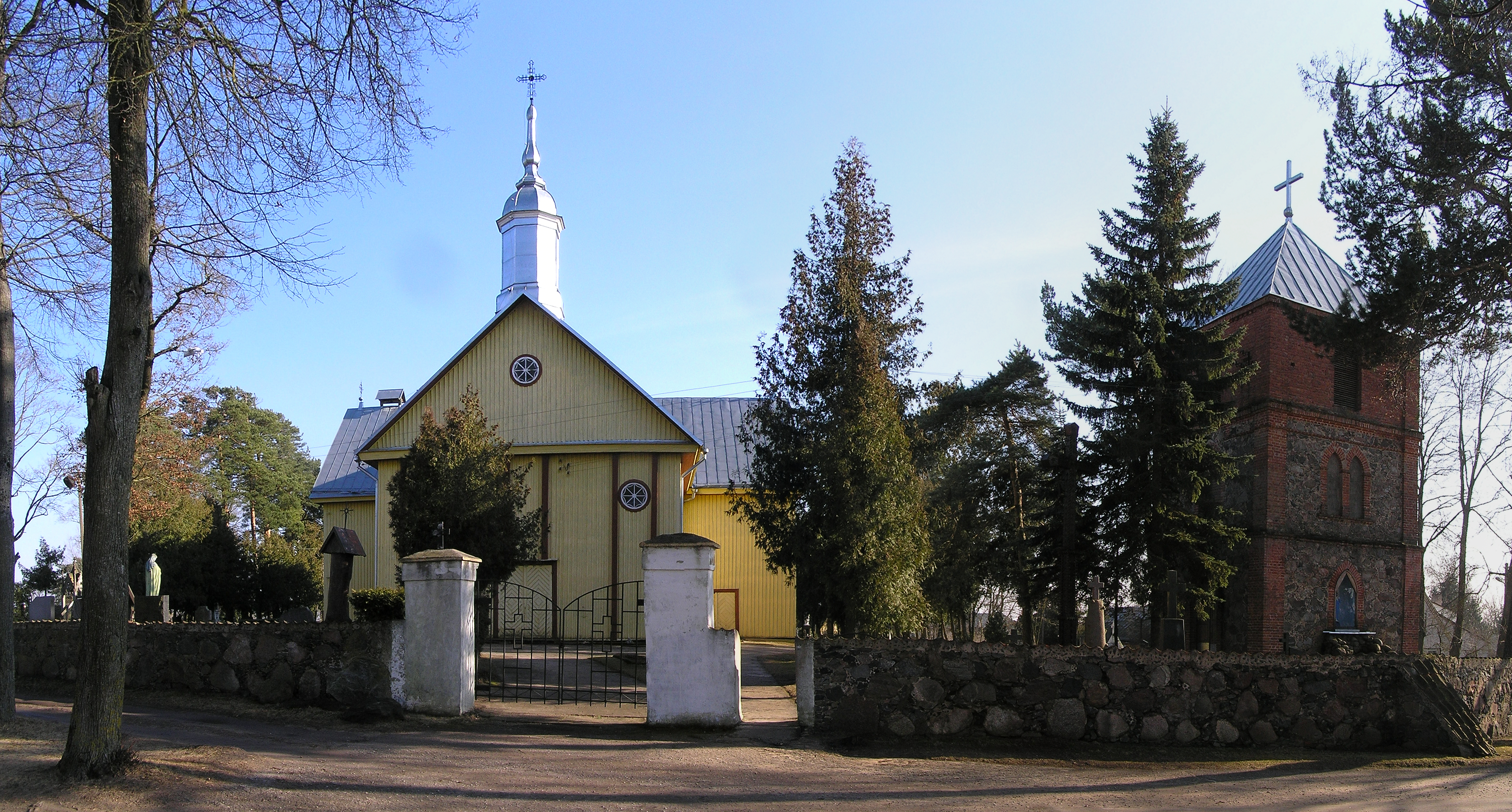
Pušalotas church

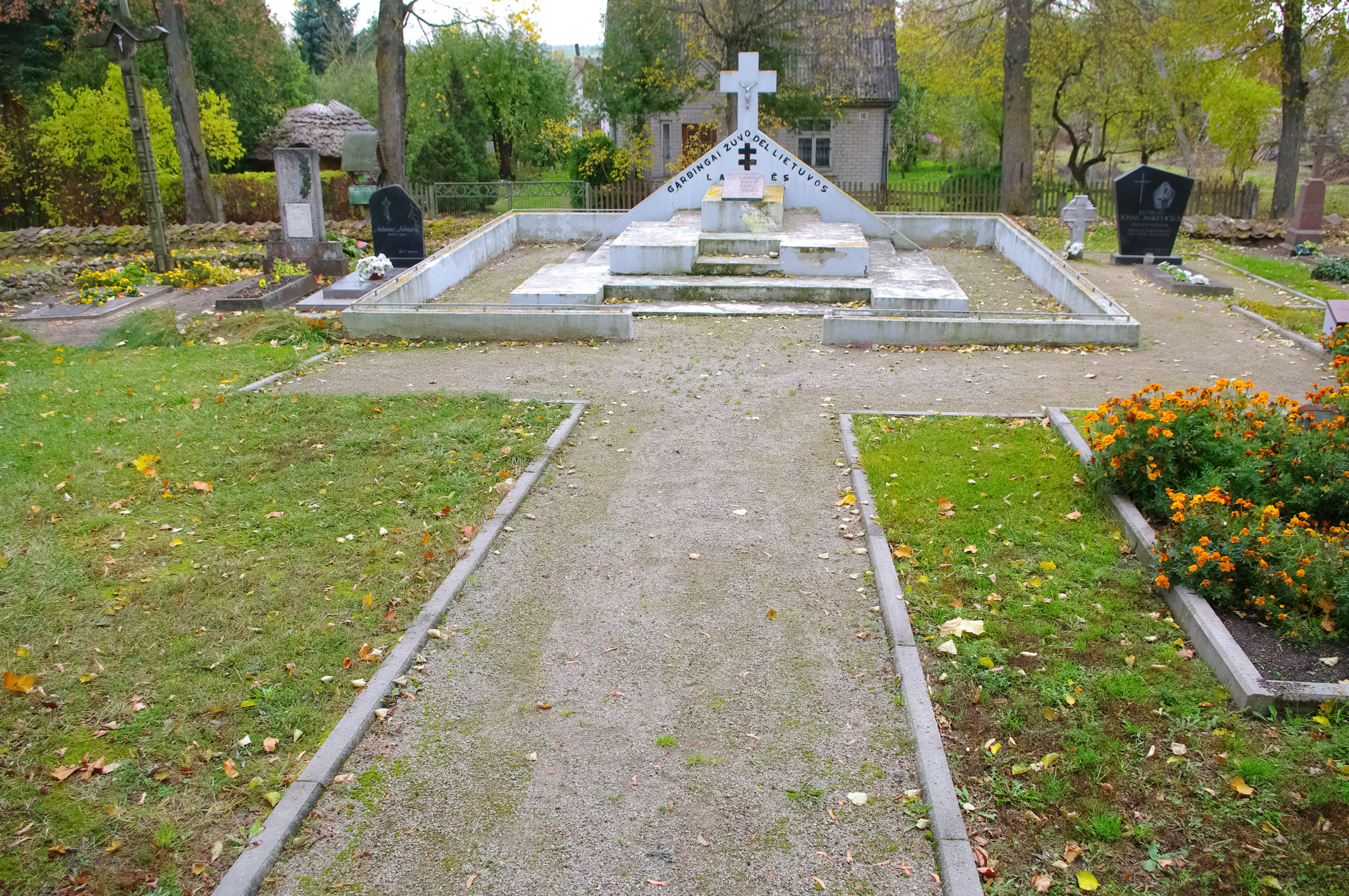
A monument for Pušalotas citizens who perished in Lithuanian Wars of Independence in 1918–1919

Pušalotas (Polish: Puszołaty) is a small town in Panevėžys County, in northeastern Lithuania. According to the 2011 census, the town has a population of 692 people.

== History ==
Pušalotas first mentioned in 1643. In 1639 the church was built. In 17th – 18th centuries Pušalotas was a center ruled by a vogt. In 1644 Pušalotas got a licence to organize markets. In 1738 Pušalotas had 12 and in 1789 – 26 houses. In the middle of 19th century parish school was operating.

In the 19th century, pastor J. Jaskevičius supported carriers of banned Lithuanian press (knygnešiai), established secret schools in Lithuanian language, since education in Lithuanian was banned after the 1863 Uprising.

Ten Jewish men and women as well as Soviet activists were murdered in July 1941, in the Jewish cemetery of the city. In the same month local white armbanders shot 18 more Jews in the forest of Šadeikoniai. Another execution of the town's Jews might have taken place in August or September 1941 with 248 killed; the exact date and circumstances of the massacre are not known.

After the Soviet occupation, Lithuanian partisans of Algimantas military district were active, namely the Žalioji (The Green) detachment. Soviet occupants in 1940–41 and in 1944–53 deported 35 people to remote areas of Siberia.

== Famous natives ==
Katherine Rosman's great-great-grandfather, Morris Stein, was born in Pušalotas in 1852. The Jewish family had been in the town since at least 1801. Rosman's great-grandmother, Rose Stein Wyman, was born in the neighboring Pumpėnai.
