= Vilkija =

- Town
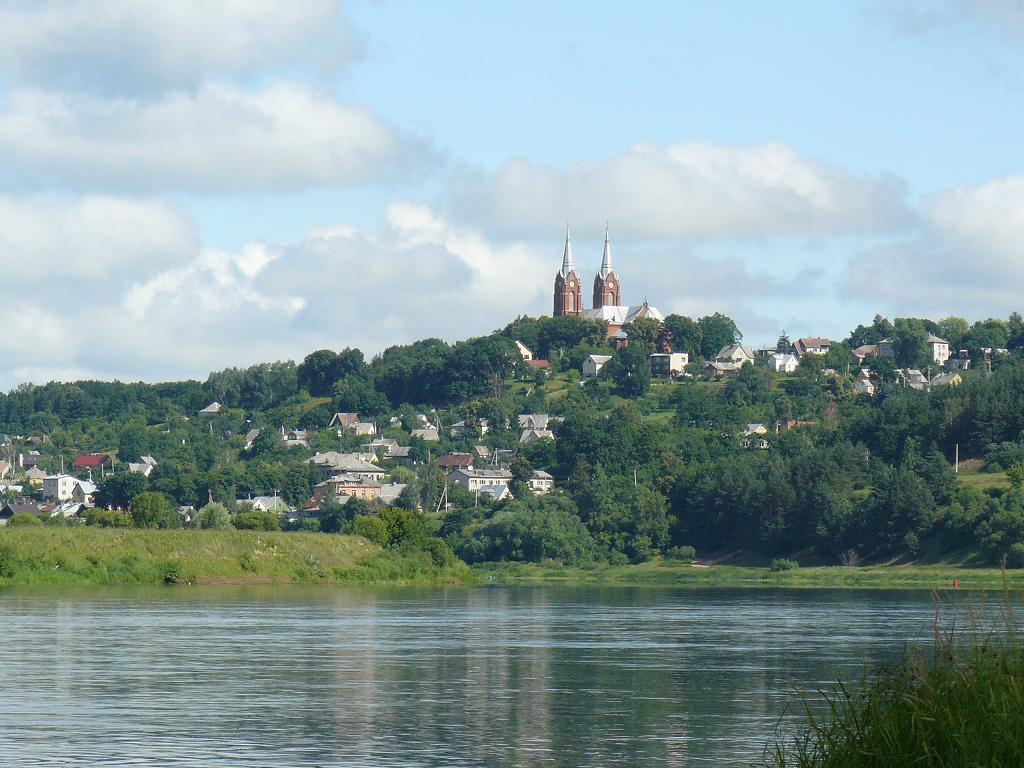

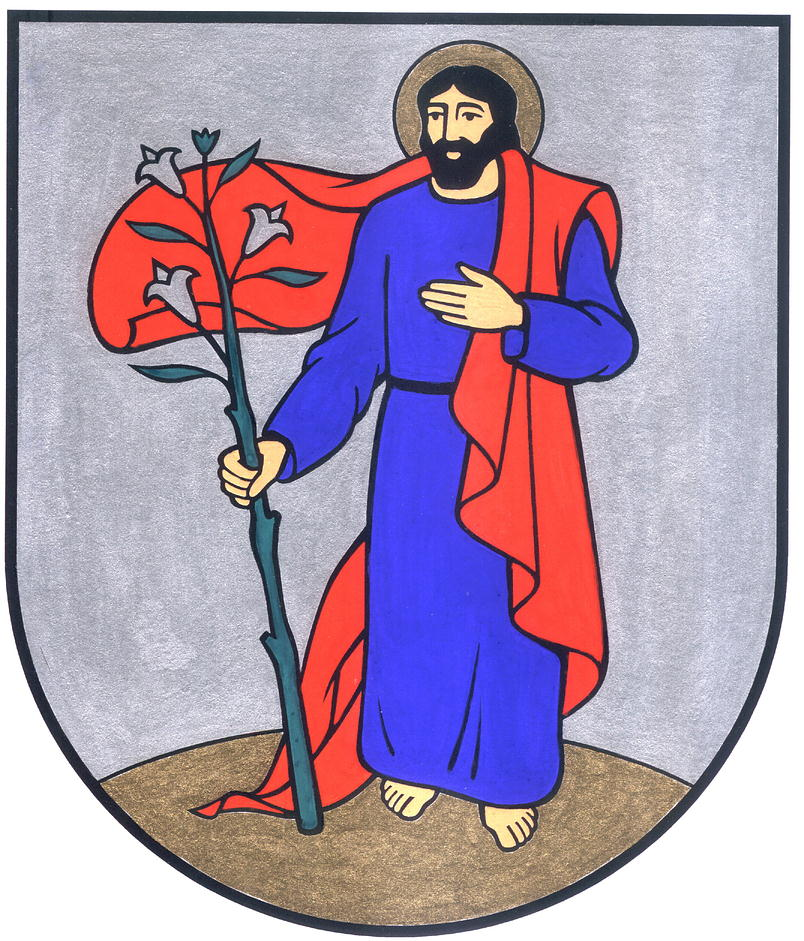
- Coat of arms

- Location of Vilkija
- Coordinates: 55°3′0″N 23°35′0″E
- Country: Lithuania
- Ethnographic region: Aukštaitija
- County: Kaunas County
- Municipality: Kaunas district municipality
- Eldership: Vilkija eldership
- Capital of: Vilkija eldership
- First mentioned: 1364
- Granted city rights: 1792

Population (2022)
  - Total: 1,738
- Time zone: UTC+2 (EET)
  - Summer (DST): UTC+3 (EEST)

Vilkija is a town in the Kaunas district municipality, Lithuania. It is located 21 km (13 mi) north-west of Kaunas city municipality, right on the north side of the river Nemunas, the most important river in Lithuania.

== Etymology ==
The exact origin of the town name is not known, but it is derived from the Lithuanian word vilkas (which means wolf). According to a legend, people who lived on the opposite side of Nemunas river heard the packs of wolves howling in the surroundings of the place where the contemporary town is situated; since then, this land was called Vilkija and this name may have been derived from words vilkų gauja meaning a pack of wolves.

Names in other languages include Polish: Wilki; Yiddish: ווילקי, romanized: Vilki.

== History ==
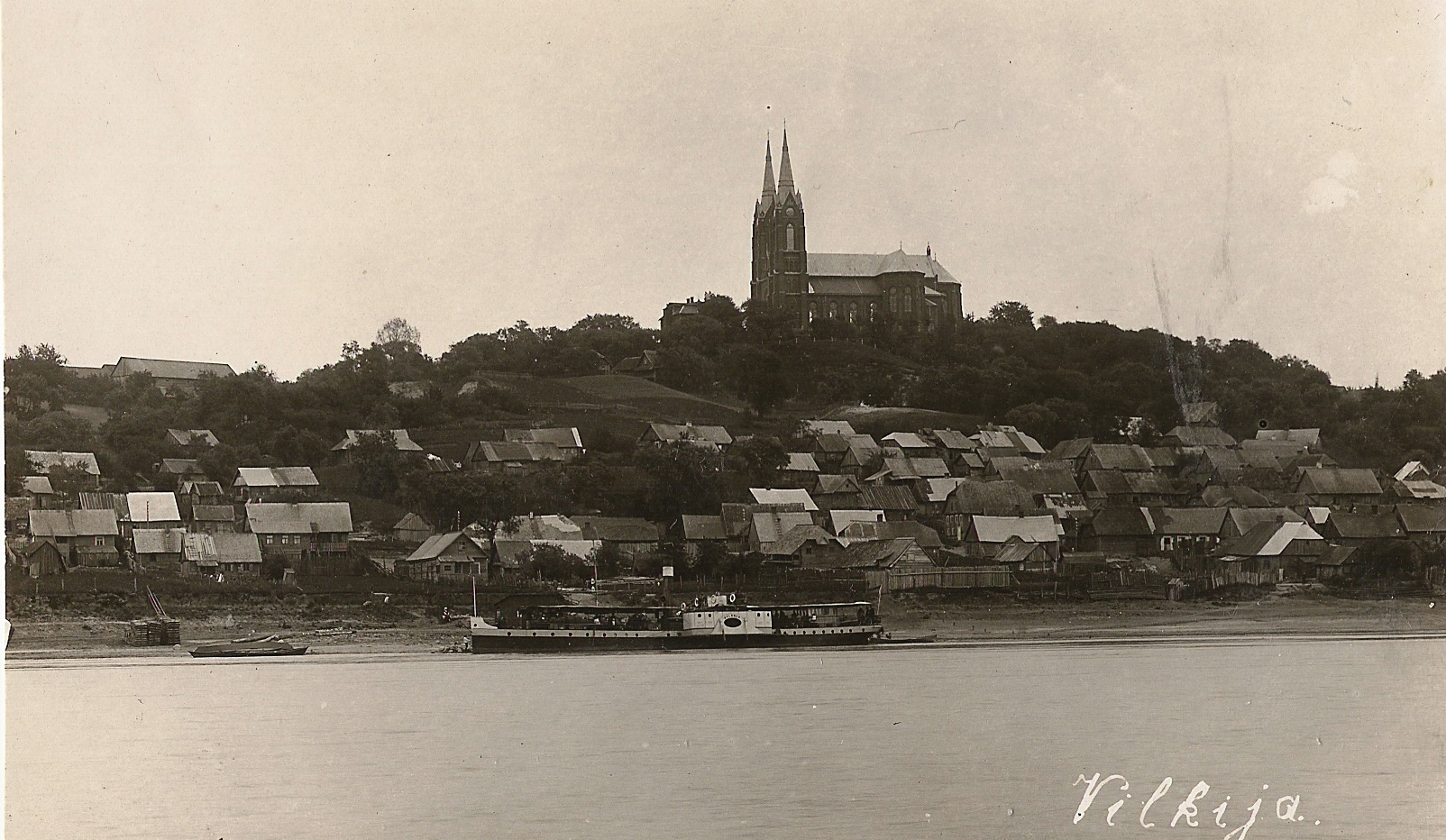
Vilkija in 1928

Vilkija was first mention in chronicles in 1364 as Wilkenbethe. In 1369, Vilkija Castle (or Paštuva Castle, near the current village of Jaučakiai village) was destroyed. On 2 September 1430 September, Vilkija is mentioned by the Grand Duke of Lithuania Vytautas in a letter to the Teutonic master Paul von Rusdorf. In 1450, the first Lithuanian customs house on the Nemunas near Vilkija is mentioned in the documents of Gdańsk merchants. The land and water trade routes Vilnius-Königsberg passed through Vilkija, which encouraged the growth of the settlement.

During World War II, the town was under Soviet occupation from 1940, and then under German occupation from 1941 to 1944. During summer and fall 1941, mass executions of 800 Jews were perpetrated by an Einsatzgruppen of Germans and Lithuanian nationalists. Murdered Jews were from Vilkija and nearby villages.

== Notable people ==
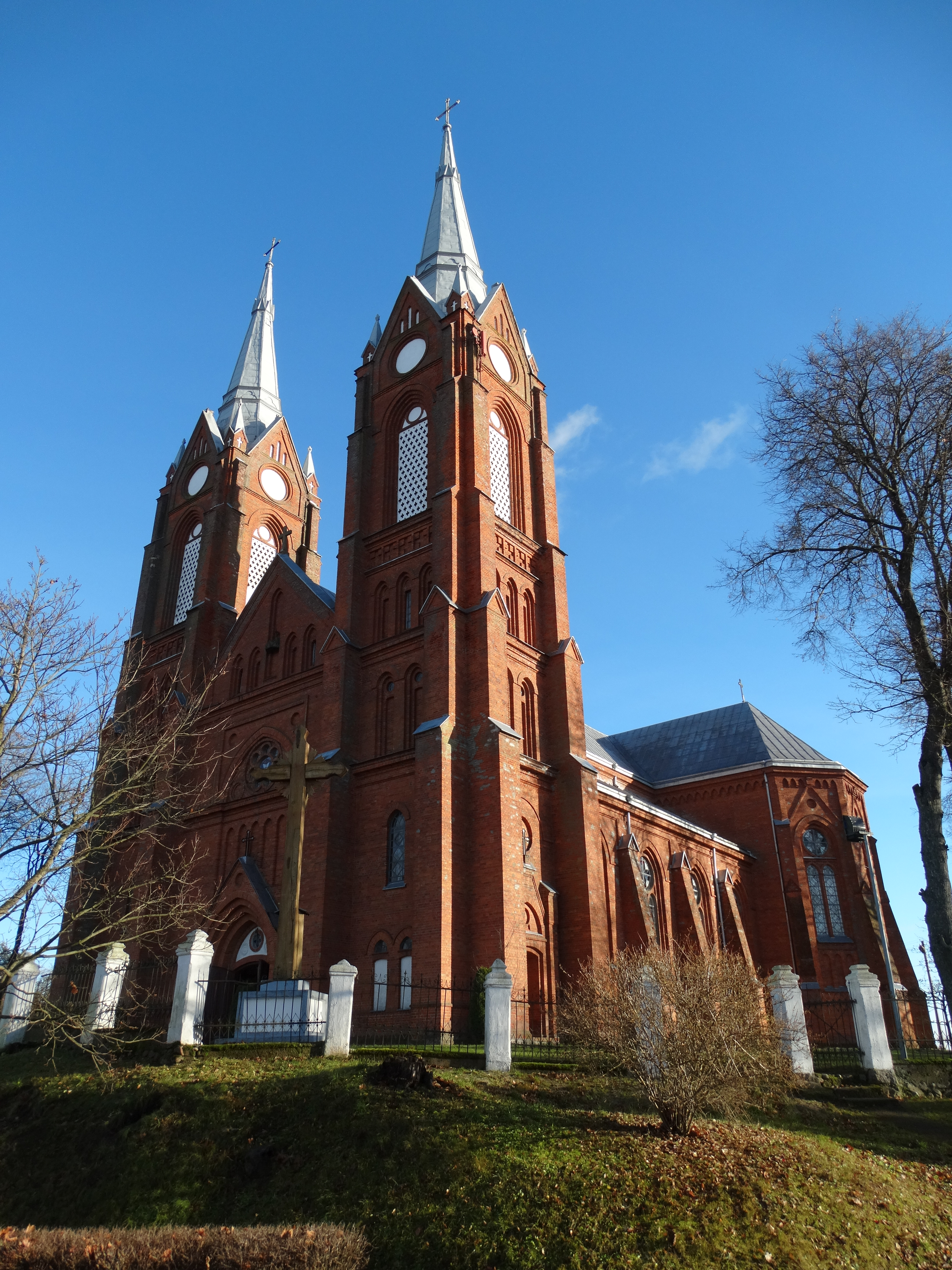
Church in Vilkija

- Folklorist Antanas Juška (1819–1880) lived in Vilkija 1862–1864.
- In the end of 1863 one of the revolt leaders Antanas Mackevičius (1828–1863) was captured close to Vilkija and later taken to Kaunas to be executed.
- Writer Petras Cvirka (1909–1947) studied in Vilkija 1922–1926.
- Basketball player Vytenis Lipkevičius (1989–) was born in Vilkija.
