= Šiupyliai =

- Village
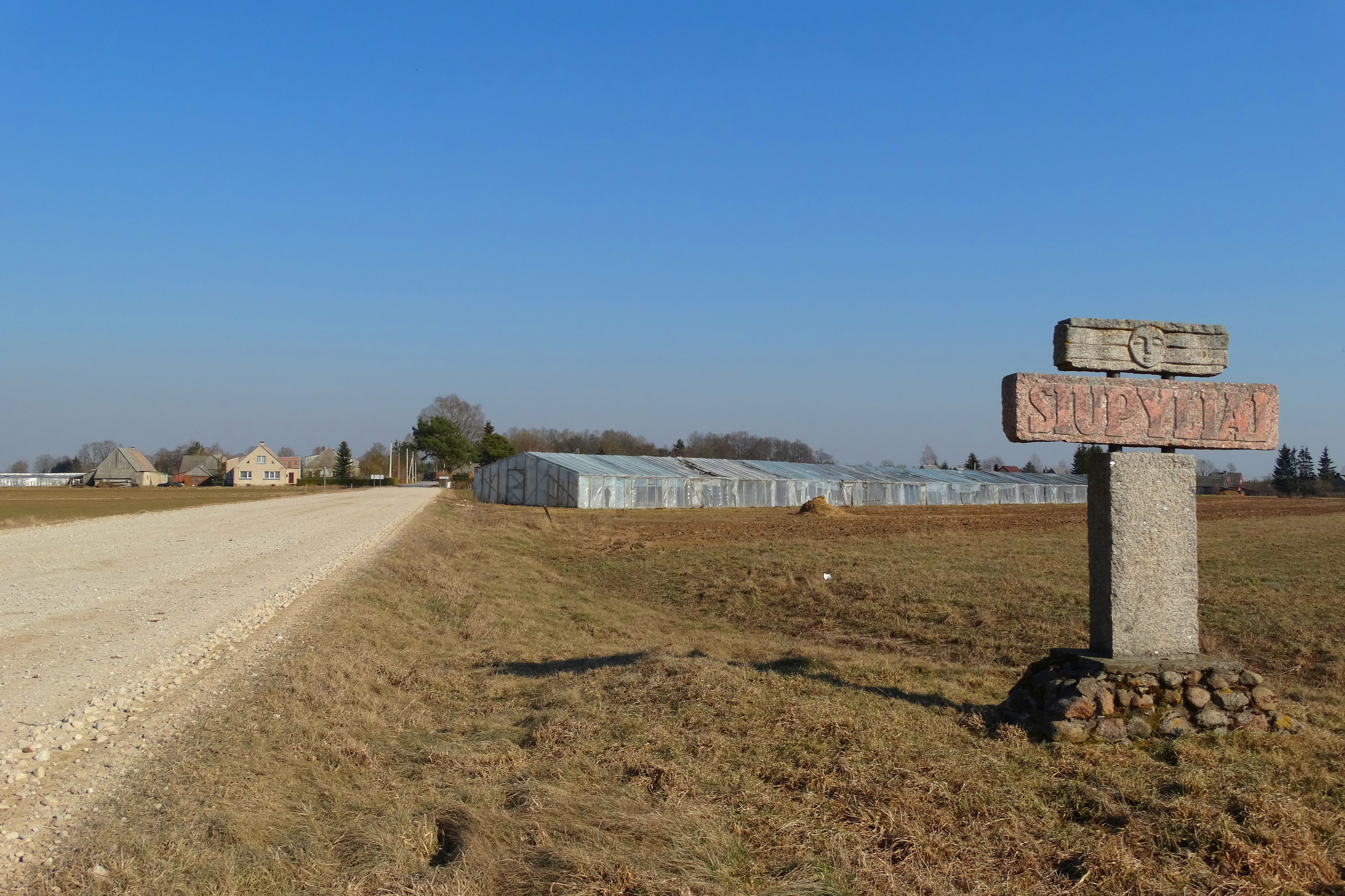

- Location of Šiupyliai
- Coordinates: 56°5′40″N 23°9′0″E
- Country: Lithuania
- Ethnographic region: Samogitia
- County: Šiauliai County
- Municipality: Šiauliai district municipality
- Eldership: Gruzdžiai eldership

Population (2011)
  - Total: 324
- Time zone: UTC+2 (EET)
  - Summer (DST): UTC+3 (EEST)

Šiupyliai is a village in Šiauliai district, Lithuania, with a population of 324 according to the 2011 census. It has a wooden church, built in 1924 and named after Saint Aloysius Gonzaga. According to folk etymology, village's name is derived from supiltas (from "pour") in reference to a nearby hill fort.
