= Institute of Lithuanian Literature and Folklore =

Lithuanian research institute

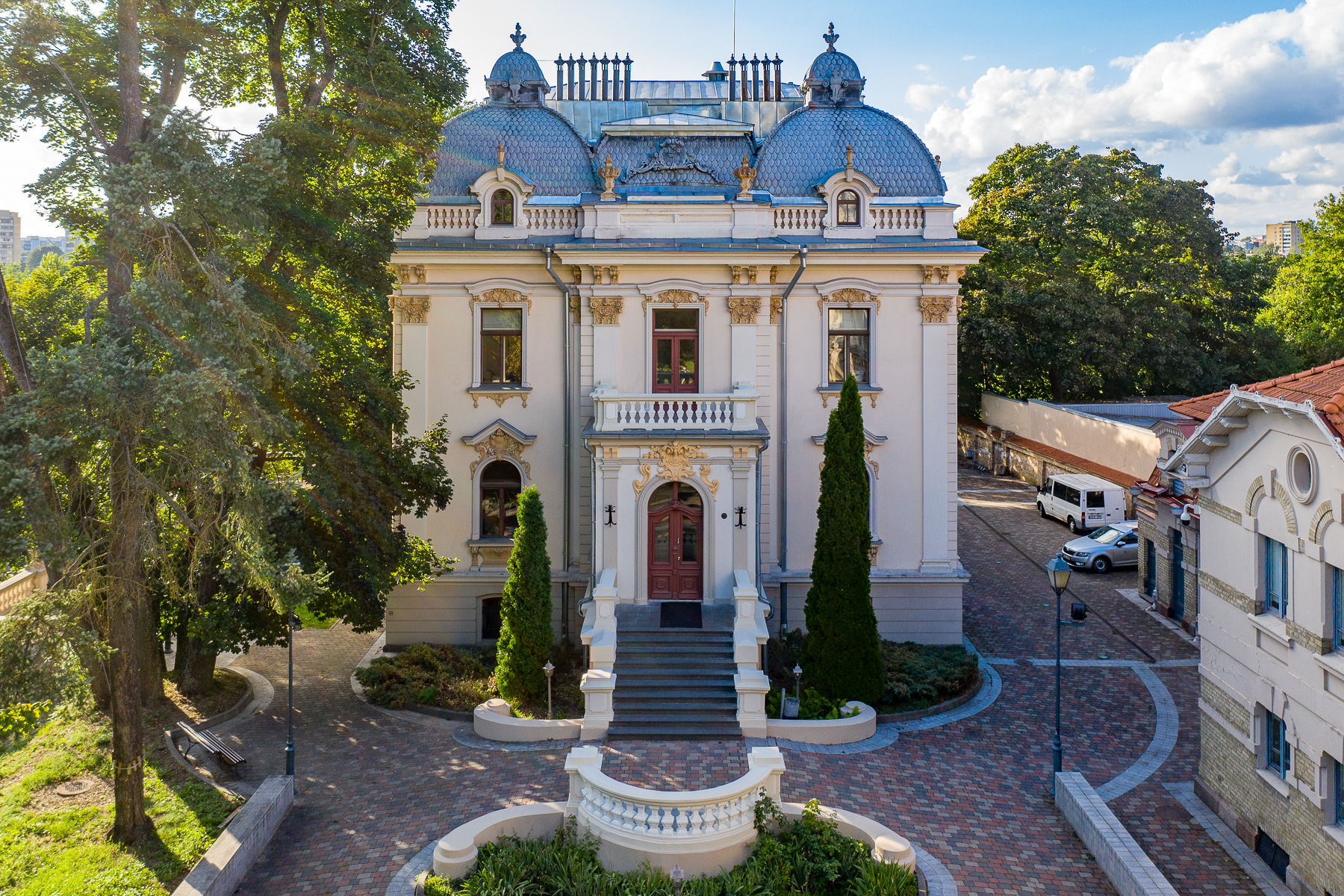
Vileišis Palace

The Institute of Lithuanian Literature and Folklore (Lithuanian: Lietuvių literatūros ir tautosakos institutas) is a scientific institution in Lithuania. It conducts research in Lithuanian literature and folklore. It resides in the former Vileišis Palace in Antakalnis district of Vilnius.

== History ==
In 1939, the Institute of Lithuanian Studies was founded, and in 1941 it was renamed the Institute of Lithuanian Literature. In 1952, after merging the Institutes of Lithuanian Literature and Language and the Folklore Department of the Institute of History, the Institute of Lithuanian Language and Literature was founded as part of the Lithuanian Academy of Sciences. In 1990 the latter was split into the Institute of Lithuanian Literature and Folklore and the Institute of the Lithuanian Language.
