= Riga Latvian Society =

Latvian cultural organization founded in 1868

- Rīgas Latviešu biedrība
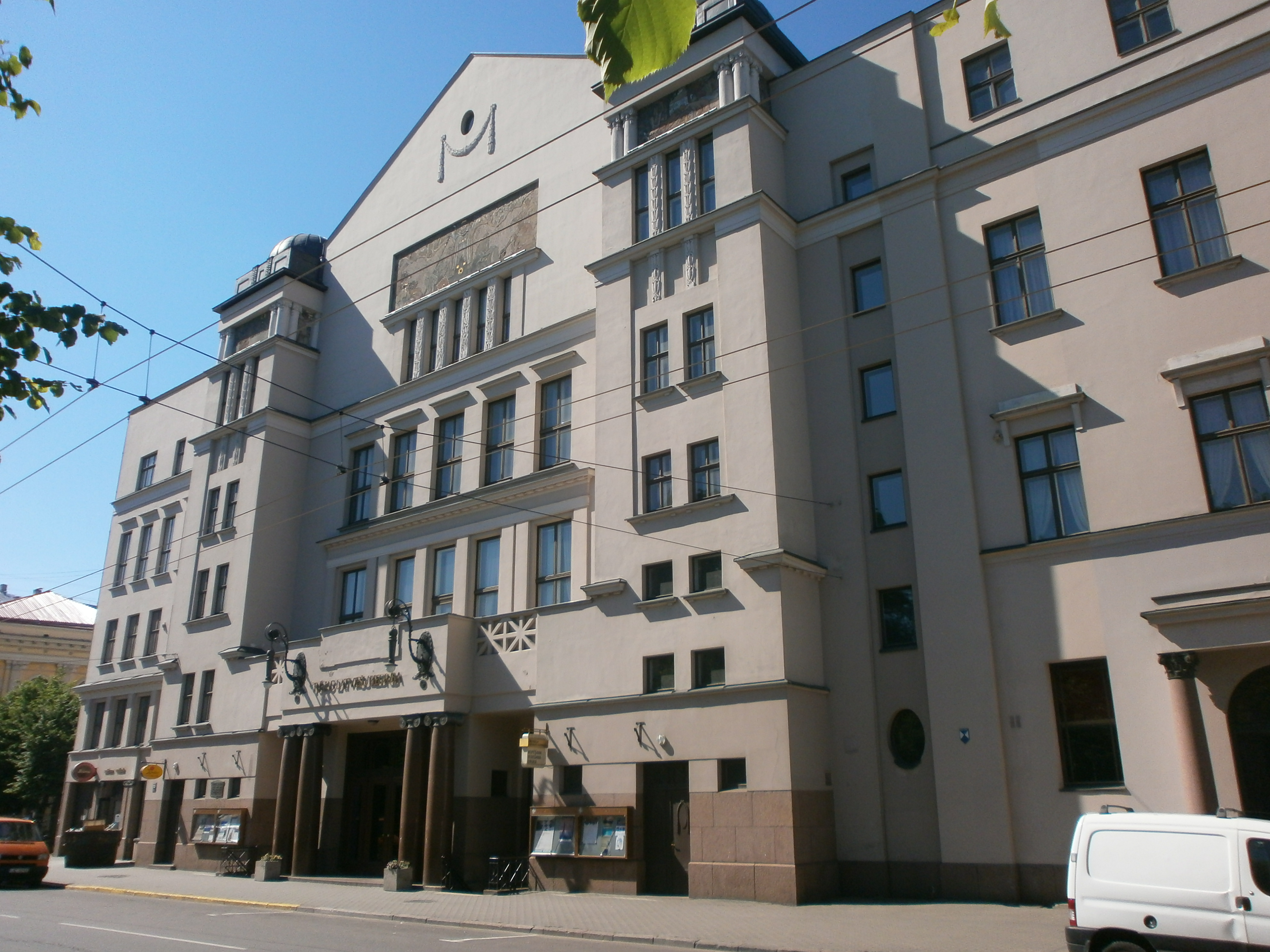
- Riga Latvian Society House in 2014
- Abbreviation: RLS
- Formation: 22 November 1868; 157 years ago
- Type: Cultural organization
- Headquarters: 13 Merķeļa Street, Riga, Latvia
- Official language: Latvian
- Website: rlb.lv

The Riga Latvian Society (Latvian: Rīgas Latviešu biedrība; RLS) is a cultural organization in Riga, Latvia. Founded in 1868, it is one of the oldest Latvian public associations. Its early work included Latvian-language theatre, museum collecting, publishing and the organization of the first General Latvian Song Festival.

The society was closed after the Soviet occupation of Latvia in 1940 and restored on 14 January 1989. It is based at the Riga Latvian Society House at 13 Merķeļa Street, where it organizes lectures, conferences, concerts, performances and other cultural events.

== History ==
=== Foundation ===
The society developed from the Latvian Relief Society for Estonians Suffering from Want, which was founded in Riga on 2 March 1868 after a crop failure in Estonia. It raised money through concerts, lectures and a performance on 2 June of Žūpu Bērtulis, a Latvian adaptation of Ludvig Holberg's Jeppe on the Hill. The performance is regarded as the beginning of professionally organized Latvian theatre.

After the relief campaign, Bernhards Dīriķis, architect Jānis Frīdrihs Baumanis and manufacturer Rihards Tomsons proposed a permanent association. Its organizers first met on 16 August 1868. The Russian Ministry of Internal Affairs approved the statutes on 24 October, and more than 100 members attended the founding meeting on 22 November. They elected a 36-member governing body, which chose Dīriķis as chairman. The society's stated purposes were charitable assistance and educational work among Latvians in Riga; political activity was not included in its statutes.

=== Cultural work ===
The society organized much of its work through commissions. In 1869 its Science Commission began collecting ethnographic and historical material and founded a museum, a predecessor of the Latvian National Museum of History. Its theatre work helped establish a permanent Latvian stage in Riga. In 1873 the society organized the first General Latvian Song Festival.

The Useful Books Division published works and translations in Latvian, including reference books. After the Republic of Latvia was established in 1918, the museum, theatre and several other activities begun by the society passed to state institutions, and the scale of its work declined.

=== Closure and restoration ===
Soviet authorities closed the society in the summer of 1940 and took over its building for military use. The society resumed its work on 14 January 1989. It is now a voluntary, independent cultural association that maintains a library and archive and supports amateur and professional ensembles.

== Society House ==
The society completed its first house on the present site in 1869. The building, designed by Jānis Frīdrihs Baumanis, was later rebuilt and was destroyed by fire in 1908. Architects Eižens Laube and Ernests Pole designed the replacement, which was completed in 1909 in the Neoclassical style. Its façade includes decorative panels designed by Janis Rozentāls. An extension designed by Laube was built between 1935 and 1938.
