= Bernardinai.lt =

Lithuanian newspaper

- Website type: Online newspaper, Christian mass media
- Available in: Lithuanian
- Headquarters: Vilnius, Lithuania
- Editors: Jurgita Jačėnaitė (editor-in-chief); Michailina Bočiarova (translator)
- CEO: Juozas Ruzgys
- Website: www.bernardinai.lt
- Commercial: No
- Registration: None
- Launched: February 21, 2004

Bernardinai.lt is a Lithuanian online Christian newspaper. It was launched on February 21, 2004 and is run by a Franciscan community in Vilnius. Bernardinai.lt was founded as an alternative to major Lithuanian media, with a goal to provide objective information. The website operates under the Confucius quote that serves as its motto: "Instead of cursing the darkness, light a candle!"

== Funding and operations ==
Bernardinai.lt operates as a nonprofit organization supported primarily through reader donations. They reported that monthly operational costs were approximately €20,000, while reader donations typically ranged from €3,600 to €3,700 per month, covering only a fraction of total expenses.

As of August 2026, according to Similarweb, the publication ranked #565 in Lithuania and #251,628 globally. The website's gender demographic was 32.59% male and 67.41% female, with 54.26% of traffic coming from search engines and 28.38% from direct visits.

== Publishing activities ==
Beyond its online newspaper, Bernardinai.lt operates as a publishing house, producing various print publications. The organization publishes the quarterly magazine "Kelionė su Bernardinai.lt" (transl. Journey with Bernardinai.lt), described as "a story about fundamental things, an attempt to look at our daily choices and different areas of life from a Christian perspective." The magazine is designed for those seeking comprehensive personal growth and maturity.

== Editorial staff and authors ==
The director (CEO) of Bernardinai.lt is Juozas Ruzgys, acting editor-in-chief of the website is Jurgita Jačėnaitė; various content is edited by Jurga Žiugždienė, Rasa Baškienė, Saulena Žiugždaitė, Donatas Puslys, Aušra Čebatoriūtė, Kostas Kajėnas. The language editor is Michailina Bočiarova.

The newspaper has published writings by many Lithuanian journalists and social activists: Rimvydas Paleckis, Ginas Dabašinskas, Dalius Stancikas, Vladimiras Laučius, Tomas Viluckas, Valdas Kilpys, Aušra Maslauskaitė, Doloresa Kazragytė, Giedrius Kuprevičius, Egdūnas Račius, Laima Arnatkevičiūtė, Gintautas Vaitoška, Leonidas Donskis, Virgis Valentinavičius, Arūnas Poviliūnas, Indrė Makaraitytė, Rytis Juozapavičius, Vytautas Radžvilas and others.
