= Arskoe Cemetery =

Cemetery in Kazan, Tatarstan, Russia

Coordinates: 55°47′30″N 49°09′20″E

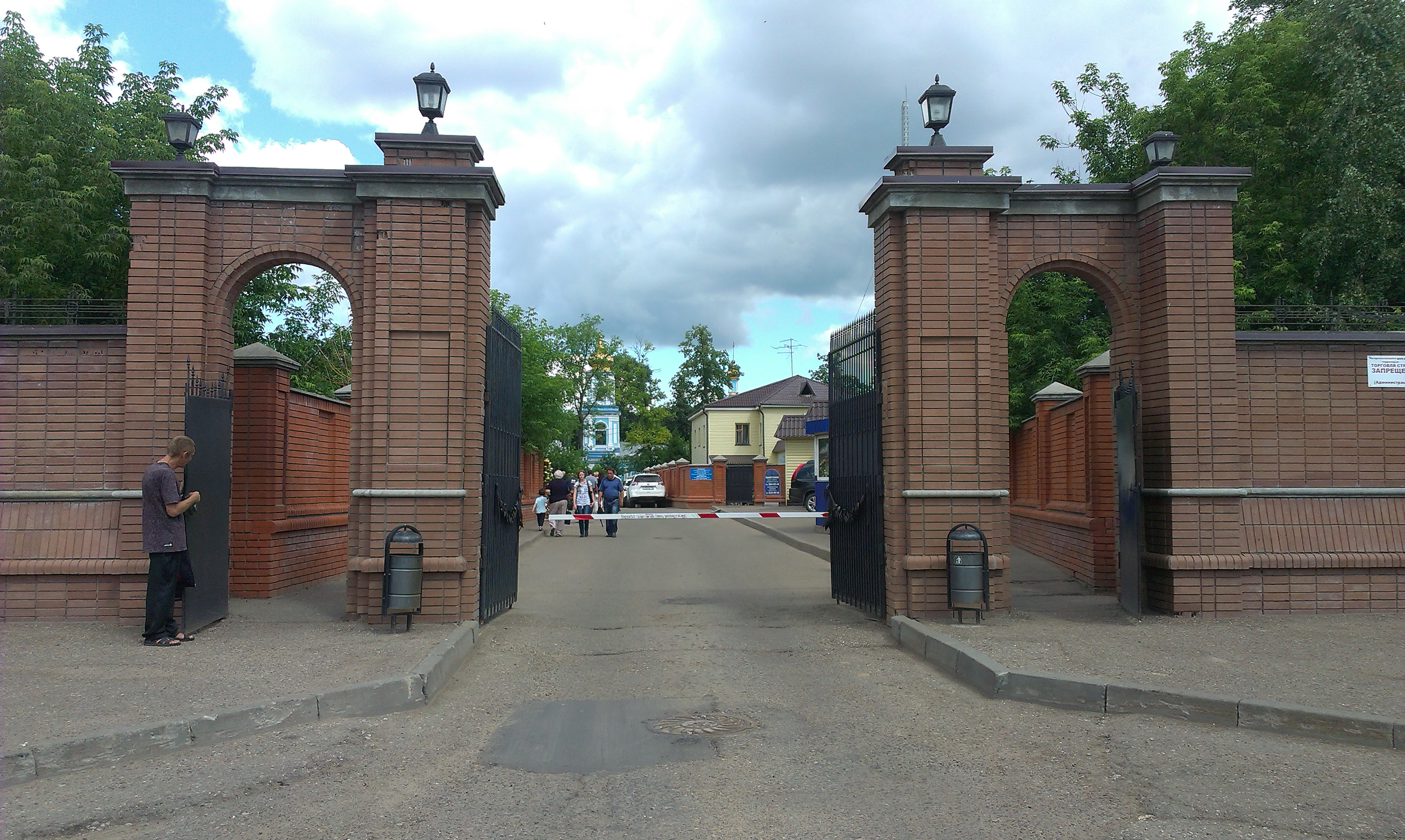
Entrance

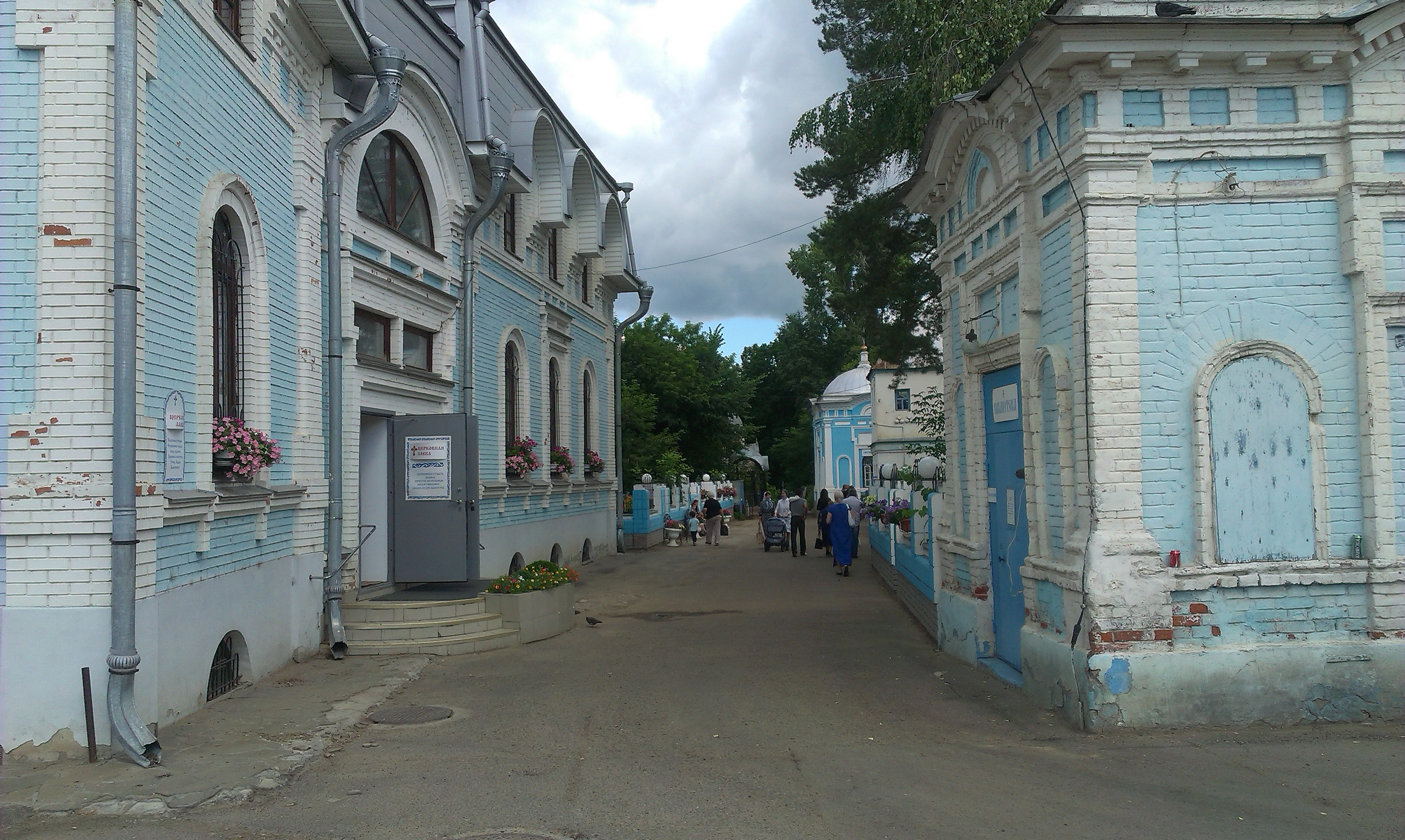
Arskoe Cemetery

Arskoe Cemetery is the central necropolis in Kazan, and is located in the city's Vakhitovsky District, to the northeast of Kazan's centre in Tatarstan, Russia.

The cemetery church of the Holy Yaroslavl Miracle Workers was built in 1796 and was the only church in Kazan to remain open during the Soviet era. A highly venerated 18th-century copy of the Kazan icon of the Mother of God is enshrined in the church.

The cemetery was already in existence in 1766, and is shown on a map of the city from that year. The first recorded burials in the cemetery date from 1774.

Originally several separate cemeteries, expansion has led them merging into one necropolis, with separate section for Orthodox, Catholic, Jewish and Lutheran burials. The complex also includes a military cemetery. In total, over 300,000 people have been buried at Arskoe.

== See also ==
- Category:Burials at Arskoe Cemetery
