= Lithuanian Catholic Academy of Science =

Lithuanian academic organization

Lithuanian Catholic Academy of Science (Lithuanian: Lietuvių katalikų mokslo akademija or LKMA) is an academic organization (academy of sciences) established in 1922 in Kaunas, Lithuania. It unites Catholic scientists from various fields, from humanities to astrophysics, and promotes academic research, organizes academic conferences (including general conference every three years), publishes academic literature. Its most active section is devoted to history, and in particular to the history of the Catholic Church in Lithuania. Other active sections include those devoted to humanities, education, and medicine. In 1922–2008, LKMA elected a total of 60 true academic members. Its main academic journals are LKMA suvažiavimo darbai (Works of LKMA Conferences), LKMA metraštis (LKMA Chronicle), and Bažnyčios istorijos studijos (Studies of the History of the Church).

During the interwar years, it was most active in providing scholarships to students, organizing three general conferences in 1933, 1936, and 1939, and compiling a biographical dictionary (unpublished). It was abolished in 1940 after the Soviet occupation. As many Lithuanian intellectuals fled abroad in 1944, LKMA was reestablished in Rome in 1956. Twelve local chapters were organized in United States, Canada, and Germany. LKMA resumed organizing general conferences every three years and began publishing academic monographs and journals – a total of 52 publications. In 1973, it took over the American Lithuanian Cultural Archives (ALKA) in Putnam, Connecticut. LKMA was reestablished in Lithuania in 1990 and officially moved its headquarters to Vilnius in 1992. It officially joined the Pax Romana federation in 1993. LKMA continues to organize various conferences and publish academic monographs and journals – approximately 130 publications were published between 1990 and 2020.

== History ==
=== Establishment ===
Various Russification policies were relaxed in 1904 and Lithuanian clergy organized societies Saulė in Kovno Governorate, Žiburys in the Suwałki Governorate, and Rytas in the Vilna Governorate to fund and operate Lithuanian schools. In 1907, Pope Pius X published encyclical Pascendi dominici gregis in which, among other things, he announced the establishment of the International Catholic Scientific Association. Lithuanian clergy, in particular Pranciškus Būčys and Adomas Dambrauskas-Jakštas, discussed in Draugija whether to join this new organization with the Lithuanian Scientific Society or to establish a separate Catholic organization. However, the International Catholic Scientific Association never materialized and Lithuanian plans were postponed due to World War I to 1922. The University of Lithuania with a Faculty of Theology and Philosophy was established in February 1922. LKMA registered its charter on 12 August 1922 and called the founding meeting on 22 October 1922. The meeting elected its first board: chairman Juozapas Skvireckas, vice-chairmen Pranas Dovydaitis and Stasys Šalkauskis, secretary Mečislovas Reinys.

=== Independent Lithuania ===
By 1924, LKMA had 60 members who organized private gatherings two or three times a year. Initially, the academy focused on supporting gifted Lithuanian students. Its scholarship fund was established with a donation of $42,500 (equivalent to $817,470 in 2025) from the Lithuanian Roman Catholic Federation of America. It was later replenished by repayments by former scholarship recipients of the Motinėlė Society. Among the supported students were Juozas Ambrazevičius-Brazaitis, Pranas Dielininkaitis, Zenonas Ivinskis, Antanas Maceina, Antanas Salys, Antanas Vaičiulaitis, Adolfas Damušis, Juozas Girnius, Stasys Antanas Bačkis. LKMA received another approximately $50,000 that was collected from Lithuanian Americans in hopes of establishing a Catholic university.

LKMA organized a library. Though plans to merge it with the libraries of the Kaunas Priest Seminary and of the Archdiocese of Kaunas were not realized, the library contained 12,000 volumes by 1940. In 1927, Dambrauskas-Jakštas initiated the compilation of a biographical dictionary of famous Lithuanians, regardless of religious or political beliefs. In total, 2,638 biographies or five volumes were prepared, but they were not published due to the Soviet occupation. Only one volume Užgesę žiburiai (Extinguished Lights), edited by Juozas Tumas-Vaižgantas, with 22 biographies of Lithuanians and 14 biographies of non-Lithuanians, was published in 1930. LKMA collaborated in preparing Lietuviškoji enciklopedija, the first Lithuanian encyclopedia. Starting in 1924, LKMA members organized public lectures and later published their texts in Catholic-minded periodicals. Overall, the academy was not very active in the 1920s as many of its members worked at or were involved with other Catholic organizations, including the Priest Seminary and the Faculty of Theology and Philosophy.

LKMA became more active in the 1930s when the authoritarian regime of President Antanas Smetona and his Lithuanian Nationalist Union began suppressing its opponents, including the Lithuanian Christian Democratic Party and other Catholic groups. Among other things, the government dismissed 18 professors from the Faculty of Theology and Philosophy in 1931 and blocked plans for a Catholic university in 1932. LKMA began the process of separating amateur science enthusiasts from professional academics and started organizing its conferences every three years. They took place in 1933, 1936, and 1939, featured 26–31 presentations, and were attended by 300–550 people. The conferences were accompanied by exhibitions, concerts, tributes to famous Lithuanians (such as Maironis or Vaižgantas). During the conference, academics worked in various specialized sections (such as history, law, literature and art, medicine) with hopes that these sections would grow into separate institutes. A women's section was organized during the first and the second conferences.

=== Exile ===
LKMA was disestablished on 10 August 1940, a month after the Soviet occupation, and its property transferred to the Ministry of Education. In 1944, many prominent Lithuanian intellectuals retreated west ahead of the approaching Red Army. They reestablished many Lithuanian organizations and publications. The idea of reestablishing LKMA was first proposed by Stasys Antanas Bačkis in June 1952. He suggested to base the academy in Rome where Lithuanians already had the College of St. Casimir. He was supported by historian Zenonas Ivinskis and priest Antanas Liuima, professor at the Pontifical Gregorian University. The reestablishment of LKMA was officially announced on 16 February 1955. Its board was elected in January 1956 and the academy was officially registered with the Italian authorities on 9 October 1956. Liuima became an ideological leader and long-term chairman of LKMA. The academy organized chapters where at least five LKMA members lived. The first such chapter was organized in Chicago based on a Lithuanian scientific study club. In total, there were twelve chapters: Chicago (established in 1956), New York (1962), Boston (1963), Detroit (1964), Montreal (1964), Toronto (1964), Dayton (1965), Munich (1966), Ottawa (1970), Putnam (1971), St. Pete Beach (1981), Los Angeles (1983).

The academy resumed organizing its conferences, held every three years in different locations in Europe and North America. The conferences struggled to reconcile LKMA's academic mission and the need to engage and educate the wider Lithuanian diaspora. The conferences were also cultural events – they were accompanied by exhibitions (e.g. of historical maps of Lithuanian, philately, numismatics), concerts, commemorations of historical anniversaries (e.g. 100th anniversary of the Lithuanian press ban, 550th anniversary of the Diocese of Samogitia, 400th anniversary of Vilnius University). As during pre-war conferences, academics worked in various sections, including language and literature, art and architecture, medicine. The largest and most active was the history section. Other larger sections were devoted to philosophy and theology. The history section organized three public events to commemorate the Battle of Grunwald in 1410, book smuggler Petras Kriaučiūnas, and poet Antanas Baranauskas.

LKMA published a total of 52 publications, including six biographies (including of bishops Teofilius Matulionis and Vincentas Borisevičius), monographs on the history of the church in Lithuania (on the foundation of the Vilnius University, on the worship of Mary, mother of Jesus in Lithuania), studies on Lithuanian literature, and collected works of historians Zenonas Ivinskis and Konstantinas Avižonis, linguist Antanas Salys, philosopher Stasys Šalkauskis. The academy published four volumes of Fontes Historiae Lithuanie – a valuable collection of primary documents related to ad limina visits of Lithuanian bishops and to the Diocese of Samogitia. It published eleven volumes of works presented at its conferences in LKMA suvažiavimo darbai (Works of LKMA Conferences). In total, these volumes contained 209 academic articles by 131 authors (among them, 12 women). The articles were published on various topics, not only on theology or Lithuanian language and history, but also on chemistry, medicine, sociology, technology, archaeology, etc. Other articles were biographies or obituaries of famous Lithuanians. In addition, the academy published six volumes of LKMA metraštis (LKMA Chronicle) in 1965, 1966, 1967, 1968, 1970, 1984. In total, the Chronicle contained 22 articles (19 of them on history) and 15 obituaries. Most of these publications were initiated, proofread, and edited by the long-term chairman of LKMA priest Antanas Liuima. Members of LKMA actively participated in the publication of the 35-volume Lietuvių enciklopedija published in Boston.

In 1958, LKMA organized a commission to publish popular religious literature, but when the plan failed priest Vytautas Balčiūnas organized the publication of the Krikščionis gyvenime (A Christian in Life) series. In 1974, LKMA took over the series. In total, 28 volumes were published. LKMA cared to preserve various Lithuanian archives. In 1973, it took over the American Lithuanian Cultural Archives (ALKA) in Putnam, Connecticut and reconstructed its premises in 1978–1980. Separately it acquired and preserved archives of Zenonas Ivinskis, Stasys Raštikis, Lithuanian student societies at the Swiss University of Fribourg. Even though many members of LKMA were active in various international organizations, LKMA did not join any of them.

=== Return to Lithuania ===
The idea to reestablish LKMA in Lithuania was raised in November 1989 during the organizational conference of the Catholic Youth Federation Ateitis. Priest Jonas Boruta was one of the most active advocates for the reestablishment. Already in February 1990, even before Lithuania declared independence from the Soviet Union, LKMA organized a meeting at Vilnius University attended by 250 people. Its statute was registered with the Lithuanian authorities on 8 May 1990. Its next conference was held in Vilnius in 1991, but it was attended by very few LKMA members from abroad. The organization officially returned to Lithuania in 1992 when it elected a new board from members living in Lithuania. It officially joined the Pax Romana federation in 1993 and the Commission Internationale d'Histoire Ecclésiastique Comparée (CIHEC) in 2011.

LKMA continued the tradition of local chapters, this time established in various Lithuanian cities, but only Vilnius, Klaipėda, and Šiauliai chapters were more active. Most active LKMA sections were those devoted to history, humanities, education, and medicine. The history section published a comprehensive collective monograph on the history of the Catholic Church in Lithuania in 2006. The humanities section established a separate institute under LKMA in 2007. The medicine section helped to popularize the updated Hippocratic Oath among Lithuanian doctors. After a critical evaluation of its mission and situation in 2010, LKMA decided to concentrate on humanities and in particular on the studies of the Catholic Church in Lithuania – in essence abandoning claims that it is an academy of science and recognizing that it became a more specialized research institute.

LKMA continues to publish academic journals and separate monographs. It continues to publish papers presented in its general conferences in LKMA suvažiavimo darbai. It reestablished LKMA metraštis which is published regularly every year. The history section established Bažnyčios istorijos studijos (Studies of the History of the Church) and published 8 volumes by 2016. It also continues the publication of primary documents in the Fontes Historiae Lithuanie series. In total, as of 2008, LKMA published 154 works.

In addition to its general conferences held every three years, LKMA also organizes various specialized academic conferences. For example, it held a conference on Lithuanian–Jewish relations in 1998, bishop Motiejus Valančius in 2001, Polish philosopher Marian Zdziechowski in 2008, Saint Bruno of Querfurt in 2009. Until 2008, LKMA maintained a library in Kaunas. It was liquidated when the Archdiocese of Kaunas terminated the lease of the premises with the Vytautas Magnus University. Part of the collection was transferred to the university, while the rest was transferred to the headquarters in Vilnius. Since 2003, LKMA is headquartered on Pilies Street in Vilnius in a former bishop's apartment where bishops Jurgis Matulaitis and Mečislovas Reinys used to live.

== Conferences ==
| No. | Date | Location |
|---|---|---|
| I | 1933 | Kaunas, Lithuania |
| II | 1936 | Kaunas, Lithuania |
| III | 1939 | Kaunas, Lithuania |
| IV | 2–4 October 1957 | Rome, Italy |
| V | 1–3 September 1961 | Chicago, U.S. |
| VI | 5–7 September 1964 | New York, U.S. |
| VII | 23–27 August 1967 | Lampertheim, Germany |
| VIII | 1–6 September 1970 | Toronto, Canada |
| IX | 31 August – 2 September 1979 | Boston, U.S. |
| X | 24–28 November 1976 | Southfield, U.S. |
| XI | 31 August – 3 September 1979 | Chicago, U.S. |
| XII | 24–28 November 1982 | St. Pete Beach, U.S. |
| XIII | 26–29 December 1985 | Los Angeles, U.S. |
| XIV | 3–6 October 1988 | Rome, Italy |
| XV | 9–16 June 1991 | Vilnius, Lithuania |
| XVI | 1994 | Kaunas, Lithuania |
| XVII | 1997 | Vilnius, Lithuania |
| XVIII | 28 June – 1 July 2000 | Klaipėda, Lithuania |
| XIX | 25–27 June 2003 | Šiauliai, Lithuania |
| XX | 30 June – 1 July 2006 | Vilnius, Lithuania |
| XXI | 26–29 June 2009 | Vilnius, Lithuania |
| XXII | 23–24 March 2012 | Vilnius, Lithuania |
| XXIII | 29 June 2015 | Vilnius, Lithuania |
| XXIV | 19 June 2018 | Vilnius, Lithuania |
| XXV | 3 November 2020 | Vilnius, Lithuania |

== Members ==
LKMA has four categories of members: true academic members (accomplished scientists elected by other true members), members, assistant members (those without academic degrees), and honorary members. It had 85 members in 1956, 188 in 1965, 226 in 1977, 263 in 1985, about 600 in 2001, about 300 in 2008. In 1922–2020, LKMA elected a total of 60 true academic members. Sofija Kanopkaitė and Angelė Vyšniauskaitė became the first women to become true members in 2000. Since 2001, board members are elected for six-year terms instead of earlier three-year terms.

=== Chairs ===
LKMA was chaired by:

- Bishop Juozapas Skvireckas – 1922–1926
- Prelate Adomas Dambrauskas-Jakštas – 1926–1938
- Stasys Šalkauskis – 1938–1940
- Bishop Vincentas Padolskis – 1956–1959
- Priest Antanas Liuima – 1959–1992
- Giedrius Uždavinys – 1992–1997
- Bishop Jonas Boruta – 1997–2006
- Paulius V. Subačius – 2006–2015
- Danutė Gailienė – 2015–2020
- Liudas Jovaiša – from 2020

=== True academic members ===
| Name | Field of study | Date of membership |
|---|---|---|
| Vytautas Ališauskas | History | 2015 |
| Juozas Ambrazevičius-Brazaitis | Philology | 1939–1974 |
| Vanda Aramavičiūtė | Educology | 2006–2017 |
| Audrys Juozas Bačkis | Canon law | 2003 |
| Darius Baronas | History | 2015 |
| Jonas Boruta | Physics | 1997 |
| Vilmantė Borutaitė | Biochemistry | 2020 |
| Pranciškus Būčys | Theology | 1936–1951 |
| Blažiejus Česnys | Theology | 1936–1944 |
| Adolfas Damušis | Chemistry | 1964–2003 |
| Pranas Dovydaitis | Law, philosophy | 1933–1942 |
| Juozas Eretas | Philology | 1936–1984 |
| Danutė Gailienė | Psychology | 2009 |
| Juozas Girnius | Philosophy | 1964–1994 |
| Kęstutis K. Girnius | Philosophy | 2000 |
| Julijonas Gravrogkas | Engineering | 1959–1968 |
| Bronius Grigelionis | Mathematics | 1991–2014 |
| Jonas Grinius | Philology | 1959–1980 |
| Gintaras Grušas | Canon law | 2015 |
| Stasys Yla | Theology | 1961–1983 |
| Zenonas Ivinskis | History | 1939–1971 |
| Antanas Dambrauskas - Adomas Jakštas | Theology-philosophy | 1933–1938 |
| Juozas Jakštas | History | 1970–1989 |
| Liudas Jovaiša | History | 2009 |
| Mečislovas Jučas | History | 2006–2019 |
| Sofija Kanopkaitė | Biochemistry | 2000 |
| Kazys Napaleonas Kitkauskas | Architecture | 2006 |
| Antanas Klimas | Philology | 1970–2016 |
| Antanas Kučinskas | History | 1970–1988 |
| Vytautas Landsbergis | Musicology | 1997 |
| Antanas Liuima | Theology | 1959–2000 |
| Antanas Maceina | Philosophy | 1961–1987 |
| Irena Regina Merkienė | Ethnology | 2006 |
| Vytautas Merkys | History | 2003–2012 |
| Guido Michelini | Philology | 2009 |
| Vacys Milius | Ethnography | 1997–2005 |
| Juozas Leonas Navickas | Philosophy | 1970–1998 |
| Kazys Pakštas | Geography | 1939–1960 |
| Antanas Paškus-Paškevičius | Psychology, philosophy | 1961–2008 |
| Vytautas Pavilanis | Medicine | 1970–2006 |
| Justinas Pikūnas | Psychology | 1961–2018 |
| Aldona Prašmantaitė | History | 2006 |
| Paulius Rabikauskas | History | 1961–1998 |
| Arvydas Ramonas | Theology | 2009 |
| Mečislovas Reinys | Philosophy | 1939–1953 |
| Povilas Rėklaitis | Art history | 1970–1999 |
| Antanas Rubšys | Theology | 1961–2002 |
| Antanas Salys | Philology | 1959–1972 |
| Alfred Erich Senn | Philology | 1964–1978 |
| Arūnas Streikus | History | 2009 |
| Paulius V. Subačius | Philology | 2006 |
| Simas Sužiedėlis | History | 1961–1985 |
| Stasys Šalkauskis | Philosophy | 1933–1941 |
| Antanas Tyla | History | 1991–2018 |
| Giedrius Uždavinys | Medicine | 1991 |
| Mikas Vaicekauskas | Philology | 2020 |
| Stasys Vaitekūnas | Geography | 2006–2016 |
| Vytautas Vardys | Political science | 1970–1993 |
| Angelė Vyšniauskaitė | Ethnography | 2000–2006 |
| Romualdas Zalubas | Astrophysics | 1959–2003 |
| Zigmas Zinkevičius | Philology | 1991–2018 |
| Vanda Žekonienė | Agronomy | 2003 |

=== Honorary members ===
LKMA had seven honorary members. LKMA honorary members were:

- Adomas Jakštas
- Pranciškus Juras (1959)
- Juozapas Karalius (1961)
- Antanas Rudis (1961)
- Juozas Eretas (1979)
- Stasys Antanas Bačkis (1979)
- Jonas Balkūnas
- Antanė Kučinskaitė (2000)
- Elena Neniškytė (2009)

== Bibliography ==
- Bloznelis, Mindaugas (2003). "Lietuvių katalikų mokslo akademijos raidos kelias". Lietuvių katalikų mokslo akademijos metraštis (in Lithuanian). 22. ISSN 1392-0502.
- Labanauskas, Ramūnas (2012). Lietuvių katalikų mokslo akademija 1922–2012: Istorinė apžvalga ir bibliografija (PDF) (in Lithuanian). Lietuvių katalikų mokslo akademija. ISBN 978-9986-592-69-3.
- Lietuvių katalikų mokslo akademija (2003). "Lietuvių katalikų mokslo akademijos 2003 m. veiklos apžvalga". Bendraraštis (in Lithuanian). 26 (65).
- Lietuvių katalikų mokslo akademija (3 June 2015). "Akademikai" (in Lithuanian).
- Mačiūnas, Leonas Laimutis (28 August 2009). "Apie vaistus, šeimą ir senėjimo problemas". XXI amžius. Pro vita (in Lithuanian). 8 (105). ISSN 2029-1299.
- Miklas, Kęstutis K., ed. (2002). Tautos Fondas (Lithuanian National Foundation, Inc.) 1943-2002 (in Lithuanian). Lithuanian National Foundation. ISBN 0-9718144-0-6.
- Rigal-Cellard, Bernadette (2010). "Creationism". In Melton, J. Gordon; Baumann, Martin (eds.). Religions of the World: A Comprehensive Encyclopedia of Beliefs and Practices. Vol. A–B (2nd ed.). ABC-CLIO. p. 824. ISBN 978-1-59884-203-6.
- Urbonienė, Skaidrė (2007). "Lietuvių katalikų mokslo akademijos XX suvažiavimas "Saugus žmogus – saugus pasaulis"" (PDF). Lietuvos etnologija (in Lithuanian). 7 (16). ISSN 1392-4028.
- Vasiliauskienė, Aldona (20 July 2000). "Lietuvos katalikų mokslo akademijos XVIII suvažiavimas". Mokslo Lietuva (in Lithuanian). 14 (216). ISSN 1392-7191.
- Vasiliauskienė, Aldona (Spring 2001). "Women in the Lithuanian Catholic Academy of Science". Lituanus. 1 (47). ISSN 0024-5089.
- Vasiliauskienė, Aldona (2003). "LKMA genezės aspektai". Lietuvių katalikų mokslo akademijos metraštis (in Lithuanian). 22. ISSN 1392-0502.
- Vasiliauskienė, Aldona (30 June 2008). "Lietuvių katalikų mokslo akademija". Visuotinė lietuvių enciklopedija (in Lithuanian). Mokslo ir enciklopedijų leidybos centras.
- Vasiliauskienė, Aldona (2009). "LKMA išeivijoje: religijos mokslų sklaida" (PDF). Soter (in Lithuanian). 32 (60). ISSN 1392-7450.
- Vasiliauskienė, Aldona (20 April 2012a). "Lietuvių katalikų Mokslo Akademijos XXII suvažiavimas". Lietuvos aidas (in Lithuanian). ISSN 1648-4215.
- Vasiliauskienė, Aldona (2012b). "Juozas Eretas (Joseph Ehret): veikla Lietuvai, sugrįžus į gimtinę". Mokslo ir technikos raida (in Lithuanian). 4 (1): 62–79. doi:10.3846/est.2012.05. ISSN 2029-2449.
- Vasiliauskienė, Aldona (17 July 2015). "Susirinko LKMA nariai". XXI amžius (in Lithuanian). 28 (2148). ISSN 2029-1299.
- Virvičienė, Aušra (30 March 2013). "Naujas Lietuvių švietimo draugijos "Rytas" šimtmetis". Voruta (in Lithuanian). 7 (771): 7, 9. ISSN 2029-3534.
