= XX amžius =

XX amžius (transl. 20th Century) was a Lithuanian-language Catholic daily published in Kaunas. In total, 1,225 issues were published between 26 June 1936 and 1 August 1940.

The newspaper was established by a group of young more liberal Catholic activists to replace the closed daily Rytas of the Lithuanian Christian Democratic Party. However, the newspaper denied ties with any particular political party. It promoted values of Roman Catholicism and Lithuanian nationalism, and advocated for modernization. It was critical of the ruling Lithuanian Nationalist Union and of communism. The newspaper reacted quickly to political developments and became popular.

After the Soviet occupation of Lithuania in June 1940, the newspaper was not immediately closed. Its content was severely restricted and its editor Ignas Skrupskelis was arrested on 12 July 1940. The newspaper published its final issue on 1 August 1940.

== History ==
=== Establishment ===
Lithuania had three main daily newspaper representing three major political parties: Lietuvos aidas of the ruling Lithuanian Nationalist Union, Lietuvos žinios of the Lithuanian Popular Peasants' Union, and Rytas of the Lithuanian Christian Democratic Party. Rytas was closed by the government on 4 June 1936.

A group of young Catholic activists (average age of 27), including Juozas Ambrazevičius (Brazaitis), Pranas Dielininkaitis, Jonas Grinius, Zenonas Ivinskis, Ignas Skrupskelis, Stasys Yla, and Antanas Maceina, gathered with an idea to publish a cultural and religious magazine, but quickly reacted to the news that Rytas was closed. They offered to Leonas Bistras, editor of Rytas, to take over the publication of a new daily newspaper. They chose the title after the Dutch Le Vingtième Siècle and invited priest Juozas Prunskis to become the editor-in-chief. The first issue of XX amžius was published three weeks later, on 24 June 1936 (Saint Jonas's Festival).

This version, based on memoirs of participants, makes an impression that a group of young activists created the newspaper almost impromptu. This is contradicted by information collected by the State Security Department of Lithuania. It showed that the group held a series of discussions with the leadership of the Lithuanian Christian Democratic Party (Leonas Bistras and Aleksandras Stulginskis opposed the efforts, while Mykolas Krupavičius was supportive). Additionally, the Catholic Action Center and bishop Juozapas Skvireckas agreed to finance the daily expecting it to be not profitable.

=== Relations with Catholic hierarchy ===
According to the memoirs of Yla, initially, several Roman Catholic bishops supported the newspaper while the Roman Catholic Archdiocese of Kaunas was neutral. In 1939, the first issue of Draugija which acted as the organ of the archdiocese of Kaunas published an article critical of XX amžius and its "broad" (i.e. more liberal) interpretation of Catholicism. This led to a debate in the pages of Draugija and XX amžius on the "broad" and "narrow" Catholicism which grew into a separate book Siauroji ar pilnutinė katalikybė by Stasys Yla published in 1939. This ended the open conflict, but there was no warmth in the relationship between the archdiocese and the daily. This animosity was one of the reasons why priest Prunskis resigned as editor-in-chief on 6 September 1939. The other reasons included the Invasion of Poland which he did not feel competent to cover and a new opportunity at the Catholic Press Bureau.

Additionally, XX amžius was criticized by the conservative Žemaičių prietelius published by the Diocese of Telšiai.

=== Liquidation ===
After the Soviet occupation of Lithuania on 15 June 1940, the newspaper was not immediately closed. According to Ramūnas Labanauskas, XX amžius initially supported the new Soviet regime as it was under an illusion that the Soviets were interested in a coalition government and reforms to modernize Lithuania. Soon, however, its content noticeably changed. It practically ceased publishing original editorial content and filled the pages with strictly informational or government-provided texts.

At the same time, its editorial staff started holding anti-communist meetings. In particular, Ignas Skrupskelis and Petras Kupčiūnas were implicated in maintaining contacts with Kazys Škirpa (future founder of the Lithuanian Activist Front) in Berlin. Skrupskelis was replaced as editor-in-chief by Steponas Kolupaila on 8 July. Kolupaila was a hydrology professor at Vytautas Magnus University and was supportive of the Soviet Union; he participated in the activities of the Lithuanian Society for the Study of the Culture of the Peoples of the Soviet Union. Skrupskelis and Dielininkaitis were arrested by the NKVD on 12 July. Skrupskelis was sentenced to eight years in Gulag and died in Rechlag in 1943; Dienlininkaitis was freed from prison at the start of the German invasion of the Soviet Union. Kupčiūnas was arrested and killed in the Chervyen massacre. Other key personnel retreated west and settled in Germany or the United States.

The newspaper published its final 1,225th issue on 1 August 1940 because, as it explained, "Now there is no need to have any press organs of separate groups, because the entire nation, as shown by the elections to the People's Seimas, has united on a common Soviet platform." Subscribers of XX amžius would receive copies of Darbo Lietuva or Tiesa.

== Content ==
=== Political orientation ===
As political parties (except the ruling Lithuanian Nationalist Union) were banned in February 1936, they became more ill-defined movements centered around their newspapers. XX amžius became the center of the young Catholics, sometimes referred to as amžininkai.

The daily denied ties with any particular political party, but clearly promoted Roman Catholicism and Lithuanian nationalism. This drew criticism from members of the Lithuanian Christian Democratic Party who lamented the loss of their political organ. Petras Karvelis even attempted to get XX amžius closed and revive Rytas. Further, the newspaper was critical of the old leaders of the Christian Democratic Party for idealizing the parliamentary democracy and offered alternative political systems (e.g. corporatism). The group of young idealists in conflict with the older generation drew comparisons with the Rexist Party in Belgium and the Young Turks movement in Turkey. However, after a brief period of rivalry, the newspaper decided to ally with the Christian Democratic Party and acknowledged its formal superiority.

Its Catholic ideology was primarily formulated by Stasys Šalkauskis. Chief editor Prunskis worked primarily on ensuring quick and accurate reporting of news and on recruiting contributors. He rarely wrote editorials, thus the newspaper's ideology was shaped by the editorial staff, particularly by Pranas Dielininkaitis and Ignas Skrupskelis. Prunskis was more conservative than other members of the editorial team.

=== Political criticism ===
XX amžius was critical of the government of President Antanas Smetona for lack of initiative and suppression of social rights. For example, after the German ultimatum to Lithuania in March 1939, the daily enthusiastically promoted an attempt to create a unified anti-Smetona Patriotic Front. As such, XX amžius was frequently censored and had to replace articles last minute. Therefore, it attempted to use its humor section as an outlet for government criticism.

The newspaper was anti-Soviet and anti-communist. For example, it criticized political leanings of Literatūra magazine edited by Vincas Krėvė-Mickevičius. The daily published original caricatures by artist Telesforas Kulakauskas. On 4 May 1940, the newspaper published a caricature of a giant resembling Lenin and carrying a whip; two men (writers Liudas Gira and Petras Cvirka) were depicted groveling and attempting to kiss the boots of the giant. The Lithuanian government imposed a fine of 1,000 Lithuanian litas for "inciting societal tensions and harming good neighborly relations".

=== Columns and issues ===
XX amžius established seven permanent columns. These columns sought to both inform and to influence public opinion, highlight societal issues, and prompt the government into action. Overall, the newspaper promoted a program of progress and modernization, both in culture and economic development. For example, the daily promoted construction of a hydroelectric power plant, launched a reader survey on electrification which showed that the Lithuanians were ready to adopt electricity, prompted the government to take up the issue more seriously, and brought about a lawsuit against a Belgian company for inflating electricity prices. In addition to main columns, there were smaller sections on sports, radio, book review, press review, Lithuanian diaspora, Lithuanian soldiers, etc.

The daily established a network of foreign correspondents and received daily phone reports from major European capitals. This allowed XX amžius to quickly respond and offer insight into major political events leading to World War II. The newspaper also published articles on current issues faced by the Lithuanian society, such as electrification, industrialization, social insurance reform, and protection of cultural monuments. The editorial staff paid attention to problems faced by the everyday people, e.g. by postmen, railroad workers, domestic servants, small farmers, etc. One particular story covered by XX amžius in detail was the story of Pranas Žižmaras who dueled with a Polish soldier in Vilnius (then part of the Second Polish Republic). It showed that the newspaper had good contacts within Vilnius Region.

Historian Titas Krutulys reviewed selected issues of XX amžius and counted its history-themed articles. The study revealed that the newspaper split its historical content almost evenly between Lithuanian and world history, vast majority of which related to the 20th century. The most common topic was biographies of the 19th- and 20th-century historical figures, followed by political, economic, and cultural histories. Of 171 identified biographical articles, only 20 were of religious figures.

== Format and circulation ==
In December 1936, the newspaper reduced annual subscription costs from 50 Lithuanian litas to 30 litas, while the number of pages grew from 8 to 10 (Saturday issues had 12 pages, holiday issues had 16 pages, while Easter issue had 24 pages). In January 1939, newspaper's printer Žaibas purchased a new printing press which allowed to publish 15,000 copies of 24 pages in four colors in an hour (daily issues were printed in black and red, four color were used for special occasions).

According to Yla, the newspaper started with circulation of "a couple thousand" and grew to 100,000 in spring 1939. However, other authors provide much lower circulation numbers that range from 10,000 to 26,000.

== Personnel ==
=== Editors-in-chief ===
The daily was edited by:

- Juozas Prunskis (24 June 1936 – 6 September 1939)
- Ignas Skrupskelis (9 September 1939 – 8 July 1940)
- Steponas Kolupaila (8 July 1940 – 10 August 1940)

=== Editorial team ===
There were two editorial teams. The technical team (Julius Butėnas, Antanas Pauliukonis, Petras Kupčiūnas, Jonas Rinkevičius) were in charge of gathering news and daily information and received wages.

The group of seven that initiated the daily wrote editorials and curated newspaper's columns. They were not paid. XX amžius established seven permanent columns: Economy and finances (curated by Juozas Urmanas), Work and bread (Pranas Dielininkaitis), Science and art (Jonas Grinius and Zenonas Ivinskis), Theater and film (Juozas Ambrazevičius), Home-family-school (Antanas Maceina), Academic life (Ignas Skrupskelis), and humor section Glitter and glimmer (Mirga-marga) (Juozas Ambrazevičius).

All members of the initiative team, except Skrupskelis (editor of Židinys), were faculty members of Vytautas Magnus University and a few had earned degrees in Western universities. This influx of academics into journalism was an unexpected new development in Lithuania. They were very young; the average age of the initial seven members of the editorial staff was 27 years. Five members of the editorial team were also members of Šatrija art circle. Editorial team and other Catholic activists frequently held meetings to discuss issues and strategy. Many such meetings took place in the apartments of Pranas Kuraitis and Povilas Dogelis. The meetings were occasionally attended by bishops Kazimieras Paltarokas and Mečislovas Reinys.

=== Contributors ===
In its 1,000th issue, the daily listed its contributors – 110 people in Lithuania and 20 people abroad. Regular contributors included Leonas Bistras (politics), Joseph Ehret (Spanish Civil War), Pranas Viktoras Raulinaitis (law). Stasys Šalkauskis wanted to publish a series of articles on the 20th century ideology, but only three articles were printed; he later published articles debating on the East–West dichotomy with Vytautas Alantas, editor of Lietuvos aidas.

Other contributors included bishops Pranciškus Būčys, Mečislovas Reinys, Justinas Staugaitis, poet Bernardas Brazdžionis, diplomat Edvardas Turauskas, writers Juozas Kralikauskas, Antanas Vaičiulaitis, and Vytautas Sirijos Gira, priests Adomas Jakštas, Povilas Dogelis, Pranas Gaida-Gaidamavičius, professors Pranas Dovydaitis and Kazys Pakštas, philologist Antanas Salys, astronomer Paulius Slavėnas, general Kazys Ladiga, former politicians Mykolas Krupavičius and Aleksandras Stulginskis, composer Stasys Šimkus, architect Vytautas Landsbergis-Žemkalnis.

Many of the contributors used pen names to sign their articles due to state's censorship.

== Bibliography ==
- Labanauskas, Ramūnas (2011). Jaunųjų katalikų sąjūdžio genezė, ideologiniai principai ir jų realizavimo praktika (1919–1940) (PhD thesis) (in Lithuanian). Vilniaus universitetas.
