= Joseph Ehret =

Swiss literature historian and pedagogue (1896–1984)

- Juozas Eretas
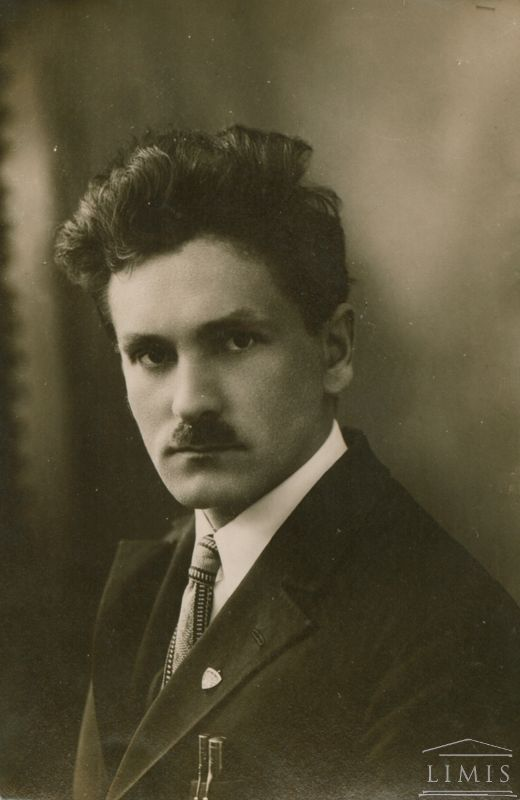
- Born: 18 October 1896; Basel, Switzerland
- Died: 13 March 1984 (aged 87); Basel, Switzerland
- Education: University of Fribourg
- Political party: Lithuanian Christian Democratic Party
- Board member of: Pavasarininkai; Lithuanian Catholic Academy of Science
- Spouse: Ona Jakaitytė-Eretienė
- Children: 8

Joseph Ehret (18 October 1896 – 13 March 1984), also known as Juozas Eretas in Lithuania, was a Swiss literary historian, activist, and educator. He was the founder and first director of ELTA, the Lithuanian telegraph agency, and professor at Vytautas Magnus University from 1922 to 1940.

Ehret attended the University of Fribourg where he met members of the Lithuanian community. When his Lithuanian friend died of the Spanish flu, Ehret promised to take his place in the new nation. Ehret worked initially as a press officer for the Lithuanian government in Switzerland. He moved to Lithuania in 1919, where he set up ELTA and served as its director until 1922. As a representative of the Lithuanian Christian Democratic Party, Ehret was elected to the Second Seimas but resigned in October 1924.

He taught German language and literature at the Higher Courses which became Vytautas Magnus University in 1922. He continued to teach until the faculty of theology and philosophy was closed after the Soviet occupation of Lithuania in 1940. Ehret was active in several Catholic organizations. He joined the Lithuanian Catholic Temperance Society and established its youth branch Angelaičiai. He revived Pavasarininkai, a rural youth organization, and was its chairman from 1922 to 1928. He promoted temperance through sports and organized the Lithuanian Physical Education Union (LFLS) and the Lithuanian Gymnastics and Sports Federation. To further the goals of these organizations, he helped founding five Lithuanian periodicals. Ehret joined the Lithuanian Catholic Academy of Science (LKMA) and was its vice-chairman from 1931 to 1940.

In 1941, Ehret and his family fled Lithuania and returned to Switzerland, where he taught at a gymnasium and lectured for the Swiss army. He continued to participate in Lithuanian cultural life. He frequently wrote and spoke about the Soviet occupation of the Baltic states and advocated for the Baltic freedom.

== Early life and education ==
Joseph Ehret was born on 18 October 1896 in Basel, Switzerland. His father died when he was four years old. In 1915, despite financial difficulties, he graduated from a gymnasium in Basel and enrolled at the Catholic University of Fribourg to study German language and history, art, and philosophy. He also attended classes at the University of Basel and University of Lausanne.

In June 1916, he joined the Swiss Armed Forces. He graduated from a military school and became a lieutenant with the 22nd Infantry Regiment of the 4th Territorial Division. In December 1918, he defended his doctoral dissertation in philosophy about the Jesuit theater in Fribourg. It was published as Das Jesuitentheater zu Freiburg in der Schweiz in 1921.

His professors included the literary historian Josef Nadler. One of his professors encouraged him to study Lithuanian due to its archaic features and similarities to Sanskrit. Therefore, he became acquainted with Lithuanian students in Fribourg. He became friends with Stasys Šalkauskis, Kazys Pakštas, Vincas Mykolaitis-Putinas, and particularly with Mikelis Ašmys, a Lithuanian from the Klaipėda Region.

== Early career ==
Based on recommendation of the history professor Gustav Schnürer, Ehret started working at the Lithuanian Information Bureau, organized by Juozas Gabrys in Lausanne, in February 1918. Ehret and Ašmys edited and published the monthly German magazine Litauen and a number of information bulletins. In 1918, Ehret published a 500-page book Litauen in Vergangenheit, Gegenvart und Zukunft (Lithuania in the Past, Present and Future) which was later translated to French.

In December 1918, Ašmys died of the Spanish flu. In his deathbed, Ašmys asked Ehret to take his place working for the benefit of Lithuania and to visit Lithuania for at least one year. Ehret had an invitation to teach German at the University of Padua, but agreed to Ašmys' request.

In early 1919, Ehret worked as a press specialist at the Lithuanian mission in Bern. In August 1919, he was invited by Juozas Purickis to the Lithuanian diplomatic mission in Berlin.

== Interwar Lithuania ==
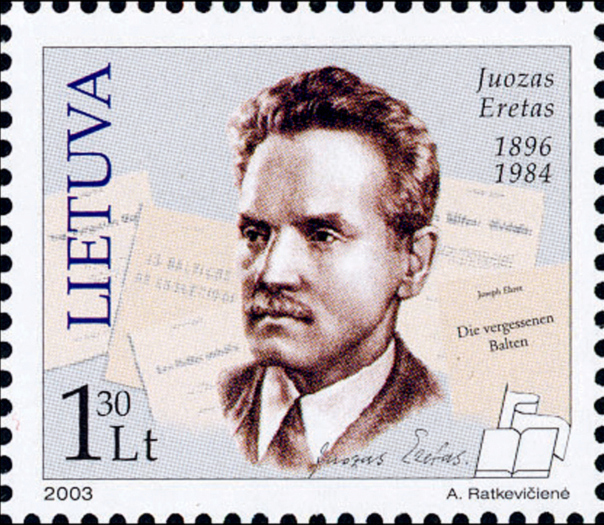
Memorial post stamp dedicated to Joseph Ehret

In interwar Lithuania, Ehret was active in the public/political life and in academic life. As years passed, Ehret shifted more towards the academic work.

=== Government roles ===
Ehret arrived in Kaunas on 15 October 1919 and was appointed as a press advisor to the Minister of Foreign Affairs. In early 1920, Ehret established the ministry's Information Department and became its director. Under the ministry, he further established ELTA, (Note: According to Ehret's memoirs, when naming the new Lithuanian telegraph agency, the ministry considered a simple acronym LTA but it was difficult to pronounce. Therefore, Petras Klimas suggested adding "E" to ease the pronunciation and to honor Ehret as the agency's founder.) the Lithuanian telegraph agency, on 1 April 1920 and served as its director until 4 February 1922, transferring his duties to Matas Šalčius. Ehret worked to establish contacts with foreign telegraph agencies. For that purpose, he traveled to Riga, Helsinki, Berlin, Paris.

In October 1920, during the Żeligowski's Mutiny, Ehret organized an evacuation of Lithuanian civil servants from Vilnius. Polish soldiers believed that Ehret was sent by the League of Nations as he wore his Swiss military uniform and spoke French. On 28 October 1920, he volunteered to join the Lithuanian Army. He was recognized as a lieutenant based on his Swiss military rank. He became an adjutant of Kazys Škirpa, commander of the 1st Volunteer Regiment (13th Infantry Regiment). He was discharged from the military at his own request on 14 January 1921. Ehret credited his experience at the regiment for inspiring him to work with the Lithuanian youth and later becoming the chairman of Pavasarininkai.

During the Lithuanian government's negotiations with Poland in Geneva and Brussels, Ehret served as a press officer. When Ehret visited Helsinki for ELTA's affairs, he was granted an audience with Rudolf Holsti, the Finish minister of foreign affairs. Using this opportunity, Ehret requested and received Finland's de jure recognition of independent Lithuania on 14 October 1921.

In June 1922, Ehret became a citizen of Lithuania. As a candidate of the Lithuanian Christian Democratic Party, he was elected to the Second Seimas (Lithuania's parliament) in the May 1923 election. He became a member of the Seimas' committee on education. During Seimas sessions, he spoke about 20 times, mostly as a representative of the Temperance Society on issues concerning alcohol production and consumption. He resigned from the Seimas on 1 October 1924. In a 1934 article, Stasys Šalkauskis claimed that Ehret was not successful in politics because he showed individualism and lacked political tact.

=== University professor ===
In fall 1919, Ehret was invited to join the committee organizing the Higher Courses, the predecessor of Vytautas Magnus University. From January 1920, he taught the German language and literature at these courses. When the university was officially opened in 1922, Ehret became a professor in the faculty of theology and philosophy. He primarily taught the German language and literature, but also had classes in French literature, literary analysis, journalism. Ehret was well liked by his students as he was less formal and was able to deliver interesting, engaging, and dynamic lectures.

In 1931, the government significantly reduced the number of personnel in the faculty of theology and philosophy and dismissed 18 professors, including Ehret. He was dismissed from the university on 15 December 1931. He was brought back by rector Vincas Čepinskis in October 1932 but at a lower position of senior assistant (this position did not need government's approval). The new salary was low and Ehret received a stipend from the Lithuanian Catholic Academy of Science.

This dismissal of professors renewed calls for a separate Catholic university and Ehret became a secretary of a committee tasked with organizing such university. The university was ready to open in August 1932, but the government postponed it indefinitely.

Ehret joined the Lithuanian Catholic Academy of Science (LKMA) in October 1922. He was its vice-chairman from 1931 to 1940. He became a true academic members of LKMA in 1936. He worked to organize LKMA's conferences in 1933, 1936, and 1939, and publish their papers in LKMA suvažiavimo darbai (Works of LKMA Conferences). He also edited and organized the publication of a biographical dictionary of Lithuanians. A total of 2,638 biographies were prepared, but they were not published as LKMA agreed to cooperate with the publishers of the first Lithuanian encyclopedia.

=== Catholic activist ===
==== Temperance ====
Encouraged by Juozas Tumas-Vaižgantas, Ehret joined the reestablished Lithuanian Catholic Temperance Society which traced its traditions to the temperance brotherhood established by bishop Motiejus Valančius in 1850s. Ehret assisted with organizing the society's monthly (later biweekly) magazine Sargyba (The Guard) which was published in 1922–1934 and 1937–1939. In May 1922, Ehret represented the society at the temperance conference in Berlin.

In 1921, Ehret founded Angelaičiai, a children's wing under the temperance society which became an independent society 1931. He also worked to establish its newspaper Angelas sargas (Guardian Angel), which merged with Žvaigždutė (Little Star) in 1923.

==== Pavasarininkai ====
Ehret revitalized and expanded Pavasarininkai (Spring Movement), the Catholic educational organization for rural youth. He was elected its chairman in 1922 replacing Leonas Bistras. In 1923, he established the newspaper Pavasarininkų vadas (Pavasarininkai Leader), which was reorganized and renamed to Jaunimo vadas (Youth Leader) in 1926. In 1925, together with others, he founded the Pavasaris People's University (a folk high school), which was later named after bishop Motiejus Valančius. In 1926, Ehret travelled to the 28th International Eucharistic Congress in Chicago and established contacts with the Knights of Lithuania.

Under Ehret, Pavasarininkai began organizing massive congresses. The first such congress was held in Šiauliai in July 1924 and attracted 7,000 people. It was accompanied by a song festival attended by 20 choirs and 970 singers. The anniversary conference in July 1927 (15 years since establishment) was particularly large; it was opened by President Antanas Smetona and was attended by guests from the Knights of Lithuania. It was accompanied by a sports competition (220 athletes), an exhibition of folk art (2,000 exhibits), and a parade that featured floats (a novelty in Lithuania).

However, the relationship between Pavasarininkai and the authoritarian regime of President Smetona was not friendly. The regime saw the Lithuanian Christian Democratic Party and various Catholic organizations as its opponents and limited their activities. Rumors had it that Ehret resigned as chairman in December 1928 to prevent complaints that Pavasarininkai were led by a non-Lithuanian and not due to poor health as officially claimed.

In 1932, the government did not grant a permit for the congress to mark the 20th anniversary of Pavasarininkai. Instead, groups organized regional gatherings and conferences. The one in Marijampolė featured speeches by Ehret, Pranas Dovydaitis, and Juozas Leimonas, in which they protested against various government restrictions. All three received three-month prison sentences for "inciting locals against the government." Ehret was imprisoned from 14 July to 7 September 1932 in Kaunas and later Marijampolė Prison.

==== Other ====
At the university, Ehret supported Catholic student organizations. He participated in the activities of the university's chapter of the Ateitis Federation. In 1926, together with Vincas Mykolaitis-Putinas, he became the co-founder of the Šatrija art circle which fostered young writers. Ehret became the curator of the art circle in 1932. In interwar Lithuania, the circle had about 300 members, including future writers Antanas Vaičiulaitis, Salomėja Nėris, Bernardas Brazdžionis, and others.

In 1926, Ehret was elected to the board of the Catholic Action Center.

=== Sports ===
Ehret also promoted temperance and healthy living through sports. In 1921, he was invited to the board of the Lithuanian Physical Education Union (LFLS) and helped establish its newspaper Sportas (Sports). In 1922, together with Karolis Dineika, he founded the Lithuanian Gymnastics and Sports Federation (LGSF) and published the federation's newspaper Jėga ir grožis (Strength and Beauty). In 1923, to unify the various sport organizations, Ehret helped organizing the Lithuanian Sports League (LSL) and was its board member.

Ehret competed at various sporting events and set the early national records in discus throw, triple jump, Swedish relay. He organized and was the "soul" of the first Lithuanian Athletics Championships in July 1921. Additionally, he organized the first sports games of Ateitis (Catholic youth organization) in July 1927 in Palanga.

Ehret wrote and published two sports textbooks – on athletics in 1922 and on muštukas (similar to baseball) and kumščiasvydis (similar to volleyball) in 1923.

== World War II ==
After the Soviet occupation of Lithuania in June 1940, the faculty of theology and philosophy at Vytautas Magnus University was closed on 15 July 1940 and most of the professors, including Ehret, were dismissed. Ehret moved to his wife's farm in Pakorbūdžiai and hid among local farmers avoiding the Soviet NKVD.

Fearing arrest by the Soviets, Ehret and his family fled to Nazi Germany on 22 March 1941. However, he was arrested and held five different camps, from which he was freed through the efforts of the Swiss government. He was held by the Nazis because of his anti-fascist articles published in the daily XX amžius.

== Switzerland ==
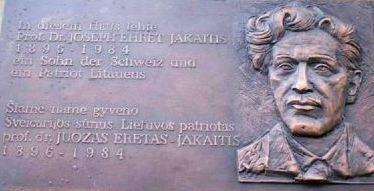
Memorial plaque at Oetlingerstrasse 42, Basel

On 5 September 1941, Ehret returned to Switzerland and settled in his native Basel. From February to October 1942, he was a chancellor of the University of Fribourg. From October 1942 until his retirement in 1962, he taught at the Business Gymnasium and Business Secondary School Basel. From 1942 to 1956, he served in the Swiss Armed Forces as an instructor and lecturer (he held the rank of senior lieutenant. From 1956 to 1969, he was a member of the education council of Basel-Stadt.

Ehret continued to be active in the Lithuanian cultural life. He was an active member of the small Swiss-Lithuanian community. He visited various Lithuanian American communities in 1961 and 1964. He frequently wrote and spoke about the Soviet occupation of the Baltic states and advocated for the Baltic freedom. He delivered speeches to members of Kiwanis and Rotary International, as well as Swiss Army officers. He edited articles on the Baltic states in Swiss encyclopedias Schweizer Lexikon (1945–1948) and Lexikon der Frau (1953–1954).

Ehret continued to be an active member of the Lithuanian Catholic Academy of Science (LKMA) which was reestablished in 1956 in Rome. He attended LKMA conferences and published his studies with LKMA help, but did not join LKMA leadership. Ehret was elected as an honorary member of LKMA in 1979 (at the time, the academy had only seven honorary members).

In 1972, Ehret was a witness in the beatification case of Jurgis Matulaitis-Matulevičius.

== Death and funeral ==
In March 1984, Ehret suffered a stroke and was found unconscious three days later in his apartment. During this time, he also contracted pneumonia. He died on 13 March 1984 in Basel and was buried in the Hörnli Cemetery. Reportedly, his funeral was postponed to 19 March because of delays in finding a flag of Lithuania to cover his coffin. His funeral was officiated by the Lithuanian bishop Antanas Louis Deksnys and attended by schoolchildren from the Lithuanian Gymnasium in Lampertheim dressed in the Lithuanian folk costumes.

== Publications ==
In total, Ehret published about 40 books.

=== Works in Lithuanian ===
Ehret wrote and published several biographies. In interwar Lithuania, he wrote biographies of Germans – young Ludwig van Beethoven (1927), German mystics Henry Suso, Elsbeth Stagel, Johannes Tauler, and Meister Eckhart (1929–1930), Johann Wolfgang von Goethe (1932, 1933), Frédéric Ozanam (1934), Ludwig Rhesa (unfinished, but two articles were published in Atheneum in 1937 and 1938). After World War II, he published three biographies of Lithuanians – Stasys Šalkauskis (1960), Kazys Pakštas (1970, republished 2002), and Pranciškus Mykolas Juras (1980).

In 1931, he published the first volume of the history of the German literature. He did not complete the second volume.

In researching materials for his works, Ehret frequently traveled abroad. Such travels included England and Belgium in fall 1922, Scandinavia in summer 1923, Belgium, Holland, and England in winter 1924/1925, Italy in summer 1925, Germany and France in summer 1927, Germany and Switzerland in summers 1928–1933.

Ehret also published philosophical works on questions of Christianity and its relationship with science (1935) and culture (1964). In Quid de nocte? (1936), Ehret investigated the spiritual decline of Europe which he saw as a struggle between anthropocentrism and theocentrism. He was concerned with the rise of nihilism, materialism, and pragmatism, but was optimistic that it could be overcome by integral humanism. His treatise from 1964 offered Christian humanism as a counter to the pessimism of Oswald Spengler, Karl Kraus, and Paul Valéry.

=== Works in German ===
Commissioned by Ticino, Ehret compiled a list of Swiss architects who worked in the Baltics and Russia. He published several separate studies on individual architects in 1948–1953, including Nicolaus Friedrich Härbel, Domenico Trezzini, Domenico Gilardi.

In 1951–1954, Ehret studied the history of the Basel Mission in Russia (1820–1838). Ehret published two works on Soviet education (1960 and 1962) and a booklet on education methods (1964).

=== Baltic freedom ===
After World War II, Ehret published several booklets bringing attention to the Soviet occupation of the Baltic states. Most successful of these was The Forgotten Balts published in German in 1973, in Spanish and English in 1974, and French in 1975. It was distributed to diplomats and journalists attending the Conference on Security and Co-operation in Europe. It was translated and published in Lithuanian in 2001.

He also published Lithuania: the European Adam (German in 1971, English in 1979), Russian Imperialism and Messianism (German in 1983, English in 1984), and others. In 1963–1965, he published three works in Lithuanian concerning the Lithuanian diaspora that fled westward at the end of World War II. He emphasized that exile did not excuse lack of cultural work. He provided historical examples of great works created by such exiles as Adam Mickiewicz, Dante Alighieri, John Amos Comenius.

=== Articles ===
Ehret published numerous articles in the Lithuanian press (Naujoji Romuva, Logos, Židinys, Soter) and helped organize five periodicals (Sportas, Jėga ir grožis, Pavasarininkų vadas, Sargyba, Angelas sargas). Ehret became a regular columnist in the Catholic daily XX amžius and covered the Spanish Civil War. These articles were published as a separate book in 1939.

In 1930–1938, he edited the academic journal Athenaeum published by the Vytautas Magnus University. It total, nine volumes were published with 52 studies, six of which were written by Ehret. He also edited three volumes of LKMA suvažiavimo darbai (Works of LKMA Conferences) in 1933, 1936, and 1939 – a total of 1,518 pages.

After World War II, he published articles in various German magazines (Die Garbe, Civitas, Die Ernte, Schweizer Rundschau, etc.) and academic journals (Basler Zeitschrift für Geschichte und Altertumskunde, Zeitschrift für Schweizerische Archäologie und Kunstgeschichte, Baltische Hefte). He continued to have articles published in the Lithuanian press, including Aidai, Draugas, Ateitis, and Šaltinis.

A collection of Ehret's articles was published in independent Lithuania in 2006.

== Personal life ==
In 1925, Ehret married his student Ona Jakaitytė (1898–1954), a relative of bankers Jonas and Juozas Vailokaitis. They had eight children, but three of them died before reaching the first birthday. The five children who reached adulthood were Juozas, Aldona, Laisvutė, Birutė, and Julija. One of his daughters was born while Ehret was held in prison in 1932 and was named Laisvutė after "freedom". All children received Lithuanian first names and were raised in the Lithuanian spirit. He sometimes used his wife's last name Jakaitis to emphasize his Lithuanianness and it is engraved in his gravestone.

Jakaitytė owned about 37 hectares (91 acres) in Pakorbūdžiai near Sintautai. The family spent summers at the farm. According to memoirs of the local residents, Ehret worked in the farm and would bring milk to a dairy in Sintautai every morning.

Around 1927, Ehret began an affair with poet Salomėja Nėris. They were seen strolling city streets and dining at Metropolis restaurant. They vacationed in Palanga and even met in Switzerland when Ehret travelled to see his family. She wrote about a hundred poems inspired by their love. However, Ehret chose his wife and family (his daughter Aldona was born in March 1928) and Nėris moved to Lazdijai to work as a teacher in fall 1928. This heartbreak is usually attributed for pushing Nėris away from Catholic and towards communist-leaning organizations around 1931. However, researcher Gerda Žalkauskaitė argues that it is a misogynist oversimplication of a complex woman and her motivations. Reportedly, after World War II, Ehret was writing a biography of Nėris.

Ehret remained close friends with Stasys Šalkauskis (they first met as students in Switzerland). They met weekly to discuss various issues and new developments, while their families frequently vacationed together in Kačerginė.

== Legacy ==
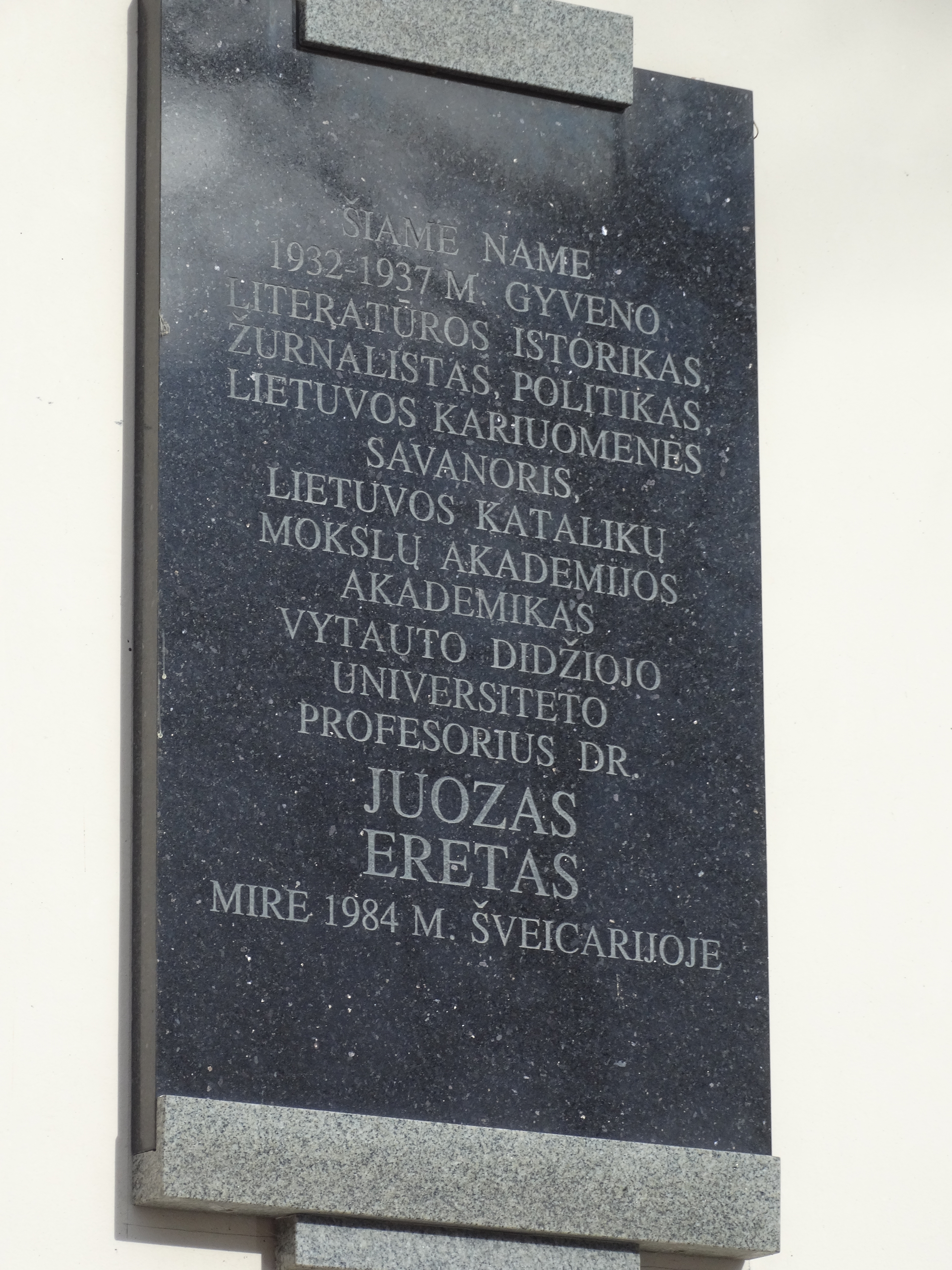
Memorial plaque for Joseph Ehret in Kaunas

In Soviet Lithuania, Ehret's memory was not commemorated. His friends published his biography, edited by Juozas Brazaitis-Ambrazevičius, in Brooklyn in 1972. In independent Lithuania, Ehret was remembered and is commemorated by plaques, postal stamps, lectures, and articles.

In 1996, to commemorate his 100th birthday, his family members donated a large portion of his personal archive (including photographs, books, and letters) to Vytautas Magnus University in Kaunas. In 2001, a traditional wooden column shrine with a Pensive Christ was erected near the Faculty of Catholic Theology of Vytautas Magnus University to commemorate both Ehret and his wife.

At the 10th meeting of the Lithuanian World Community in August 2000, a resolution was passed calling for the Lithuanian postal service to issue a commemorative postage stamp dedicated to Ehret. The stamp was issued in January 2003.

In October 2006, to mark his 110th birthday, a memorial plaque was installed on Ehret's old house at Rotušės a. 23/2 (23/2 Town Hall Square) in Kaunas. In 2010, a memorial plaque was installed on a house in Basel on Oetlingerstrasse 42, where Ehret grew up and where he and his family briefly lived after his return to Switzerland. The plaque, created by the Lithuanian sculptor Algirdas Bosas, includes a relief of Ehret's portrait.

In 2025, a street in Vijūkai, a village just outside of Kaunas, was named after Ehret.

== Bibliography ==
- "Eretas Juozas (Ehret Jozeph)". Žymūs Kauno žmonės: atminimo įamžinimas (in Lithuanian). Kauno apskrities viešoji Ąžuolyno biblioteka. 20 August 2025 [2022].
- Brazaitis, Juozas, ed. (1973). Didysis jo nuotykis: prof. J. Eretas tarnyboje Lietuvai (PDF) (in Lithuanian). Paterson, NJ: Prof. J. Ereto bičiuliai. OCLC 923614844.
- Čepėnas, Pranas (1986). Naujųjų laikų Lietuvos istorija (in Lithuanian). Vol. II. Chicago: Dr. Griniaus fondas. ISBN 5-89957-012-1.
- Daniliauskas, Raimondas (2013). "Žemės ūkio raida Sintautų krašte XX amžiuj". In Girininkienė, Vida (ed.). Sitautai (PDF) (in Lithuanian). Vol. I. Vilnius: Versmė. ISBN 978-9955-589-74-7.
- Eidintas, Alfonsas (2015). Antanas Smetona and His Lithuania: From the National Liberation Movement to an Authoritarian Regime (1893–1940). On the Boundary of Two Worlds. Translated by Senn, Alfred Erich. Brill Rodopi. ISBN 978-9-004-30203-7.
- Eretas, Juozas (September 1977). "Kaip šveicaras patenka į lietuvių tarpą" (PDF). Ateitis (in Lithuanian). 7 (LXVII): 216–221.
- Gaižiūnas, Silvestras (2006). "Juozas Eretas ir jo mokslinės idėjos". Kultūra. Mokslas. Religija (PDF). By Eretas, Juozas (in Lithuanian). Vilnius: Pasviręs pasaulis. ISBN 9955-435-79-8.
- Girnius, Juozas (November 1966). "MŪSŲ savasis Eretas". Aidai (in Lithuanian). 9 (194): 391–395.
- Girnius, Juozas (1975). Pranas Dovydaitis (PDF) (in Lithuanian). Chicago: Ateitis. OCLC 2431143.
- Gudienė, Danguolė; Žalienė, Dalia, eds. (2003). Lietuvos kariuomenės karininkai 1918–1953 (in Lithuanian). Vol. 3. Lietuvos nacionalinis muziejus. ISBN 9955-415-30-4.
- Jazavita, Simonas (6 April 2020). "Juozas Eretas ir 100 metų Lietuvos žurnalistikos agentūrai". Bernardinai.lt (in Lithuanian).
- Klusas, Mindaugas (21 December 2025). "Salomėja Nėris – vyrų suvedžiota auka: šį ir kitus mitus griauna istorikės tyrimas". LRT.lt (in Lithuanian).
- Kondratas, Benjaminas (8 October 2019). "SUGRĮŽUS. Paskutiniai S. Nėries mėnesiai Kaune (2)". Lietuvos aidas (in Lithuanian).
- Labanauskas, Ramūnas (2009). "Romuviečių vaidmuo jaunųjų katalikų sąjūdžio genezėje (1921-1933 m.)" (PDF). Soter (in Lithuanian). 31 (59): 169–187. ISSN 1392-7450.
- "Juozas Eretas". Lietuvos sporto enciklopedija (in Lithuanian). Mokslo ir enciklopedijų leidybos centras. 27 August 2025 [2022].
- Lukoševičius, Antanas (2003). "Lietuvos krikščioniškosios jaunimo sąjungos "Pavasaris" veikla: religinis ir tautinis jaunimo ugdymas". Tiltai (in Lithuanian). 15 (Tikėjimas ir kultūra): 358–368. ISSN 1648-3979.
- Mikalkėnaitė, Lina (30 July 2021). "Prieš 100 metų: pirmasis Lietuvos lengvosios atletikos čempionatas" (in Lithuanian). Kauno miesto muziejus.
- Puodžiukaitienė, Marija (2013). "Sintautai senolių atsiminimuose". In Girininkienė, Vida (ed.). Sintautai (PDF) (in Lithuanian). Vol. II. Vilnius: Versmė. ISBN 978-9955-589-75-4.
- Remecas, Eduardas (2016). "Lietuvių katalikų jaunimo sąjungos "Pavasaris" ženkleliai: datavimas, gamintojai, tiražai ir simboliai". Lietuvos istorijos studijos (in Lithuanian). 37: 139–153. doi:10.15388/LIS.2016.37.10057. ISSN 1392-0448.
- Subačius, Rokas (2007). Dramatiškos biografijos: kovotojai, kūrėjai, karjeristai, kolaborantai (in Lithuanian). Vilnius: Mintis. ISBN 978-5-417-00920-4.
- Survilaitė, Janina (18 October 2016). "Keli prisiminimai sutinkant profesoriaus Juozo Ereto 120-ąsias gimimo metines". Bernardinai.lt (in Lithuanian).
- Svarauskas, Artūras (2007). "Eretas Juozas (Ehreh Joseph)". In Ragauskas, Aivas; Tamošaitis, Mindaugas (eds.). Lietuvos Respublikos Seimų I (1922–1923), II (1923–1926), III (1926–1927), IV (1936–1940) narių biografinis žodynas. Didysis Lietuvos parlamentarų biografinis žodynas (in Lithuanian). Vol. 3. Vilniaus pedagoginis universitetas. pp. 251–254. ISBN 978-9955-20-345-2.
- Tapinas, Laimonas; et al., eds. (1997). Žurnalistikos enciklopedija (PDF) (in Lithuanian). Vilnius: Pradai. ISBN 9986-776-62-7.
- Vasiliauskienė, Aldona (July–September 2000a). "Juozas Eretas (Joseph Ehret) Lietuvoje 1919–1941". Logos (in Lithuanian). 22: 137–155. ISSN 0868-7692.
- Vasiliauskienė, Aldona (October–December 2000b). "Juozas Eretas (Joseph Ehret) Lietuvoje 1919–1941". Logos (in Lithuanian). 23: 148–165. ISSN 0868-7692.
- Vasiliauskienė, Aldona (2011a). "Juozas Eretas (Joseph Ehret): darbai Lietuvai". Mokslo ir technikos raida (in Lithuanian). 3 (1): 86–99. ISSN 2029-2449.
- Vasiliauskienė, Aldona (9 March 2011b). "Juozas Eretas (Joseph Ehret): "skolos" grąžinimas". Voruta (in Lithuanian).
- Vasiliauskienė, Aldona (2012). "Juozas Eretas (Joseph Ehret): veikla Lietuvai, sugrįžus į gimtinę" (PDF). Mokslo ir technikos raida (in Lithuanian). 4 (1): 62–79. ISSN 2029-2449.
- Vitkūnas, Jonas (2022). "Juozas Eretas". Lietuvos universitetui 100 (1922–2022) (in Lithuanian). Vytautas Magnus University.
- Zolubas, Algimantas (1 August 2016). "Kuklios pagarbos ženklai Juozui Eretui Jakaičiui". Alkas.lt (in Lithuanian).
