= Catholic Action Center =

Lay Catholic movement in Lithuania (1919–1940)

The Catholic Action Center (Lithuanian: Katalikų veikimo centras or KVC) was a Catholic Action organization active in interwar Lithuania from 1919 to 1940. It was an umbrella organization uniting and coordinating activities of various Roman Catholic societies and organizations in Lithuania.

== Activities ==
The center was officially registered on 20 December 1919. It published a few books and reproduction of paintings. Further publishing activities were taken over by the Catholic Press Office (Katalikų spaudos biuras) established in 1921. Activities of the Catholic Action Center intensified after the coup d'état of December 1926. The center adopted the Italian model of Catholic Action which relied on four key organizations for Catholic men, women, male youth, and female youth. In 1927, the center organized its first conference which became an annual event. In 1928–1940, it published weekly newspaper Mūsų laikraštis. In 1938, it established a fund to support the arts; this fund awarded two prizes in literature and one prize in art.

In 1931, the ruling Lithuanian Nationalist Union reduced the Faculty of Theology of Vytautas Magnus University and laid off 18 professors. This prompted Lithuanian clergy to revive ideas about a separate Catholic university. The Catholic Action Center was involved in organizing this university which was approved by the Holy See in June 1932, but the Lithuanian Nationalist Union postponed it indefinitely.

The center became a gathering place for the activists of the Lithuanian Christian Democratic Party which faced pressure and persecution by the Lithuanian Nationalist Union. The government was reluctant to take actions against the Catholic Action Center as its protection was guaranteed in the agreements between Lithuania and the Holy See.

The center was closed on 17 July 1940, shortly after the Soviet occupation of Lithuania in June 1940.

== Structure ==
The center was governed by a 13-member board. Six members were elected by the general meeting of center's members and other six plus the spiritual leader were elected by the Lithuanian bishops. The center divided its activities in regions that were based on dioceses and districts based on parishes.

== Membership ==
In 1938, the center united 23 different Lithuanian Catholic organizations, including:

- Catholic children's organization Angelaičiai (Angelo sargo vaikų sąjunga)
- Catholic youth organization Ateitis
- Labor union Lithuanian Work Federation
- Lithuanian section of Caritas
- Lithuanian Catholic Temperance Society
- Charitable Fund of Leo XIII
- Catholic Organizations' Union
- Lithuanian Catholic Teachers' Organization
- Lithuanian Catholic Women's Union
- Lithuanian Catholic Men's Union
- Book publishing Society of Saint Casimir
- Educational Žiburys Society

== Chairmen and board members ==
The center's chairmen included Aleksandras Stulginskis, Vincentas Mieleška, Antanas Tumėnas, Teofilius Matulionis, Jonas Pankauskas.

Its long-term spiritual leader was Povilas Dogelis. Other board members included Stasys Šalkauskis, Juozas Eretas, Pranas Būčys, Pranas Kuraitis, Jonas Galvydis-Bykauskas, Zigmas Starkus, Zenonas Ivinskis, Edvardas Turauskas, Pranas Dovydaitis.

Antanas Maceina and Kazys Pakštas resigned from the board due to disagreements with the bishops, while Ignas Skrupskelis and Pranas Dielininkaitis resigned in support of Maceina and Pakštas.
