= Naujoji Romuva =

Catholic arts magazine in Lithuania (1931–1940)

- Categories: Arts magazine
- Frequency: Weekly
- Founded: 1931
- Final issue: 1940
- Country: Lithuania
- Based in: Kaunas; Vilnius
- Language: Lithuanian

Naujoji Romuva (Lithuanian: New Romuva) was a weekly Catholic cultural and arts magazine which was published in Lithuania between 1931 and 1940. Its title was a reference to a Catholic association entitled Romuva. The magazine was one of the most significant publications in the country during its lifetime.

== History and profile ==
Naujoji Romuva was started as a weekly magazine in Kaunas in 1931. Juozas Keliuotis was both the founder and editor of the magazine which targeted public figures, scholars, teachers, and artists. Soon after its start, the magazine became very popular. Its goal was to present a contemporary version of the Catholic belief. However, its content was secular. It attempted to organize the right-wing intellectuals and to harmonize the relations between the Christian Democrats and the Lithuanian Nationalist Union.

Naujoji Romuva featured not only articles but also rich visual materials to reinforce a conservative approach in Lithuanian art. In addition to the writings of the Lithuanian authors, the magazine covered translation of the works by Paul Valéry, Franz Kafka, James Joyce, Jean-Paul Sartre, Marcel Proust and Aldous Huxley. Following the screening of the American pacifist film All Quiet on the Western Front in Lithuania, Naujoji Romuva published an interview with the German pacifist philosopher Friedrich Wilhelm Foerster who claimed that The Big Parade, a 1925 pacifist film, was much better than All Quiet on the Western Front criticizing the latter's depiction of Germany.

Naujoji Romuva sold 5,000 copies in 1933 and 10,000 copies in 1939. The headquarters of Naujoji Romuva was moved from Kaunas to Vilnius in 1940. The magazine was closed by the Soviet authorities the same year shortly after the invasion of Lithuania.

A quarterly magazine with the same title was established in Lithuania in the 1990s.

== Contributors ==
The contributors of Naujoji Romuva included Vytautas Alantas, Vytautas Kazimieras Alseika, Juozas Balčikonis, Vytautas Bičiūnas, Bernardas Brazdžionis, Bronė Buivydaitė, Juozas Eretas, Ernestas Galvanauskas, Juozas Grušas, Liudas Gira, Juozapas Albinas Herbačiauskas, Adomas Jakštas, Fabijonas Kemėšis, Faustas Kirša, Steponas Kolupaila, Antanas Maceina, Juozas Miltinis, Antanas Salys, Balys Sruoga, Paulius Slavėnas, Matas Šalčius, Adolfas Šapoka, Mykolas Vaitkus, Antanas Vienuolis, Juozas Tumas-Vaižgantas.
