= American Lithuanian Cultural Archives =

Archive in the United States

Coordinates: 41°55′37″N 71°52′08″W

American Lithuanian Cultural Archives or ALKA (Lithuanian: Amerikos lietuvių kultūros archyvai) is located at 37 Mary Crest Drive in Putnam, Connecticut next to the convent of the Sisters of the Immaculate Conception of the Blessed Virgin Mary. It is dedicated to the preservation of Lithuanian culture in the United States. ALKA comprises a museum, a library and the archives. It is maintained by the Lithuanian Catholic Academy of Science.

== History ==
The history of ALKA is traced to 1922 when Catholic priest Pranciškus Mykolas Juras (Francis M. Juras) began collecting Lithuanian books and periodicals at his parish in Lawrence, Massachusetts. He also collected Lithuanian art and crafts, including samples of weaving and knitting, national folk costumes, jewelry, wood carvings, and various implements and utensils. As the collection grew, it moved to the offices of the newspaper Darbininkas in South Boston in 1935. ALKA was officially established in 1941. When the newspaper moved to Brooklyn in 1951, the collection temporarily moved to a garage of the Lithuanian convent in Brockton, Massachusetts. In 1963, using his personal funds, Juras built a small house in Putnam, CT and moved his collection there. In 1973, Juras officially sold his collection for the symbolic $1 to the Lithuanian Catholic Academy of Science and ALKA became its subsidiary. The collection continued to grow and it became necessary to expand its modest premises. In 1978–1981, an extension with a basement was built bringing the total area to 814 square metres (8,760 sq ft).

== Collections ==
=== Museum ===
The ALKA museum houses artwork by over 40 Lithuanian American artists, including Adomas Galdikas, Adomas Varnas, Kazys Varnelis, Viktoras Vizgirda, Romas Viesulas, Vytautas Ignas, Jadvyga Paukštienė, Antanas Petrikonis, Bronius Murinas and Vytautas Kasiulis; collections of wood carvings by Končius, Motuza and others; old photographs of significant events in American Lithuanian history; medals of societies dating from the second half of the 19th century; textiles with Lithuanian designs; several items exhibited in the Lithuanian pavilion at the 1939 New York World's Fair, including sculptures by Robertas Antinis and Vytautas Kašuba as well as artwork by Mstislav Dobuzhinsky, Petras Kalpokas, Adomas Smetona, and Adomas Galdikas.

=== Library ===
The ALKA library contains over 30,000 books about topics of interest to Lithuanians, or written by Lithuanians; over 1,000 Lithuanian periodicals dating from 1883 to the present; old and rare books (the oldest being Tabellen zur Übersicht der Geschichte aller europäischen Länder und Staaten by C. Kruse, published in 1802); calendars dating from the late 19th century to the present; prayerbooks dating from 1859 to the present (some with dedications). In 2012, the library joined LIBIS (Lithuanian Integral Information System of Libraries).

=== Archives ===
The ALKA archives contain over 300 collections of manuscripts, letters and other documents. Collections include, among others, those of composers Jeronimas Kačinskas, Julius Gaidelis and Vytautas Marijošius, poet Faustas Kirša, priest Stasys Yla. The archive also preserves documents of various organizations, including Supreme Committee for the Liberation of Lithuania (VLIK), United Lithuanian Relief Fund of America (BALF), Lithuanian Foundation, Knights of Lithuania, Ateitis Federation, American Professional Partnership for Lithuanian Education (APPLE), Lithuanian Consulate in New York, various Lithuanian societies from the end of the 19th century. Professional archivists from Lithuania help ALKA to categorize and describe the various archives. For example, in 2014–2015, the archivists cataloged 124 boxes of documents from BALF.

== Leaders ==
ALKA was chaired by:

- Alfonsas Stankaitis (1973–1984)
- Juozas Kriaučiūnas (1984–2000)
- Juozas Rygelis (2000–2010)
- Mirga Girniuvienė (since May 2010)
