= Aidai (disambiguation) =

Aidai may refer to:

- Naujasis Židinys-Aidai
- Aichi University
- Ehime University
