= College of St. Casimir =

Priestly seminary in Rome, Italy

Coordinates: 41°52′52″N 12°31′08″E

The Pontifical College of St. Casimir (Italian: Collegio Lituano S. Casimiro, Latin: Collegium Lithuanicum S. Casimiri, Lithuanian: Popiežiškoji lietuvių Šv. Kazimiero kolegija) is a priestly seminary in Rome, Italy. Named after Saint Casimir, the patron saint of Lithuania, it was established on 19 October 1945 to educate priests who had fled Soviet-occupied Lithuania.

== History ==
In 1944, as Red Army steadily pushed westward leading to the occupation of the Baltic states, many prominent Lithuanians retreated into Germany to avoid Soviet persecutions. A group of Lithuanian priests gathered at a seminary in Eichstätt (predecessor to the Catholic University of Eichstätt-Ingolstadt). Bishop Juozapas Skvireckas began organizing a Lithuanian seminary in Rome. At the end of 1945, twenty Lithuanian clerics under prelate Ladas Tulaba, former rector of the Vilnius Priest Seminary, were sent to Rome. They were temporarily housed at the Pontifical Latin American College and attended lectures at the Pontifical Gregorian University. In December 1946, with the help from Cardinal Giuseppe Pizzardo, the college bought a former monastery of the Poor Clares for $27,000 (equivalent to $435,363 in 2024) and spent another $6,000 (equivalent to $96,747 in 2024) on renovations. In May 1947, priest Antanas Briška from United States repaid the full $33,000 to the Vatican and transferred the ownership of the building to the college.

The college received official canonical recognition on 1 May 1948. Its statute and regulations were approved by the Congregation for Catholic Education in September 1950 and it received the right to use "pontifical" in its name from Pope Paul VI in December 1960. Pope John Paul II held a mass at the college's chapel twice, on 6 May 1979 and 1 July 1991. The college educated Lithuanian priests and became a center of Lithuanian culture in Rome. The clergy cared for Lithuanian press, including the smuggling and translation of the Chronicle of the Catholic Church in Lithuania, and organized Lithuanian-language radio programs on the Vatican Radio. They were also instrumental in reestablishing the Lithuanian Catholic Academy of Science. In February 1990, the college helped Cardinal Vincentas Sladkevičius to initiate the beatification process for Lithuanian bishops Teofilius Matulionis, Mečislovas Reinys, and Vincentas Borisevičius.

In 1959, the college bought its twin building across Via Casalmonferrato and converted it to a guest house named after Villa Lituania, the pre-war Lithuanian embassy in Rome taken over by the Soviets in 1940. Sisters of St. Catherine of Alexandria and Sisters of the Holy Family (Lithuanian congregation founded in 1931 by Elžbieta Bendoravičiūtė) help administer the hotel. Profit from the guest house is used to financially support the college. It received further support from Knights of Lithuania and from bequests of various Lithuanian priests. The college also had a farm in Tivoli where students could spend summer vacations and that supplied fresh produce to its canteen. After Lithuania regained independence in 1990, most students chose to return home for the summer and the farm was sold.

After 1990, priest seminaries could freely operate in Lithuania and it was decided to change the status of the college to a priest house where clerics could stay while they pursued advance studies, like licentiate or doctorate, at the various pontifical colleges in Rome. It became subordinated to the Episcopal Conference of Lithuania (previously it was under the Congregation for Catholic Education).

== Students ==
The college was intended for Lithuanian students, but as the number of Lithuanians dwindled, it also accepted clerics from other countries, mainly South America. Soviet authorities allowed a selected few Lithuanians – some of them working for the KGB – through the Iron Curtain to study at the college. A group of 20 students arrived in 1991. Up to 2008, the college educated a total of 306 students. In 1945–1957, it had 85 students (40 priests and 45 clerics). Since 1991, it had 70 students. Among the students were Cardinal Audrys Juozas Bačkis, bishops John Bulaitis, Romualdas Krikščiūnas, Rimantas Norvila, Jonas Ivanauskas, Gintaras Grušas.
