= Juozas Girnius =

Lithuanian philosopher (1915–1994)

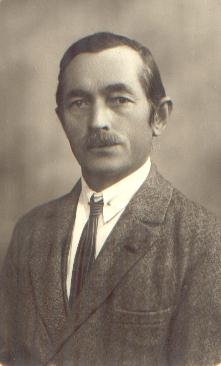
Juozas Girnius (1915–1994), Lithuanian existentialist philosopher

Juozas Girnius (May 23, 1915 in Sudeikiai, Utena district – September 13, 1994 in Boston, Massachusetts) was a Lithuanian existentialist philosopher. His philosophy combined existentialism, Catholicism, and Lithuanian nationalism. Together with Antanas Maceina and Stasys Šalkauskis, Girnius became a cornerstone of modern Lithuanian philosophy. In 1994, he was awarded the Order of the Lithuanian Grand Duke Gediminas.

In 1932, he enrolled in philosophy studies at Vytautas Magnus University in Kaunas. He studied at European universities, including Catholic University of Leuven, University of Freiburg, and Collège de France, where he attended lectures by Martin Heidegger. Girnius became interested in existentialism and chose this theme for his graduation thesis, titled The Principles of Heidegger's Existential Philosophy. During 1941–1943 he taught philosophy and psychology at Vytautas Magnus University. At the end of World War II, he left Lithuania as a displaced person. While in Germany he published a pamphlet on the Lithuanian character. In this work, Girnius favorably compared the Lithuanians with neighboring nationalities and concluded that they are warmer than the Germans and more open than the Russians. In 1949, Girnius settled in the United States.

In 1951, Montreal University (Canada) awarded him PhD for his thesis Liberty and Being. Existential Metaphysics of Karl Jaspers (original in French: La metaphysique existentielle de K. Jaspers). Thus educated in Lithuania and Western universities, Girnius managed to avoid influence of Russian philosophers, common among other Lithuanian thinkers. In 1964 he published his major work A Man Without God (original in Lithuanian: Žmogus be Dievo), a psychological analysis of non-believers. Girnius expressed his concerns regarding spreading atheism. According to him, believers strive for infinity while those who reject god lead empty lives. Later he devoted himself to Lithuanian cultural activity, editing Lithuanian encyclopedias (1953–1969) and Aidai (1965–1980), participating in various events or organizations, including Ateitininkai (a Lithuanian Catholic organization).
