= Stasys Šalkauskis =

Lithuanian philosopher

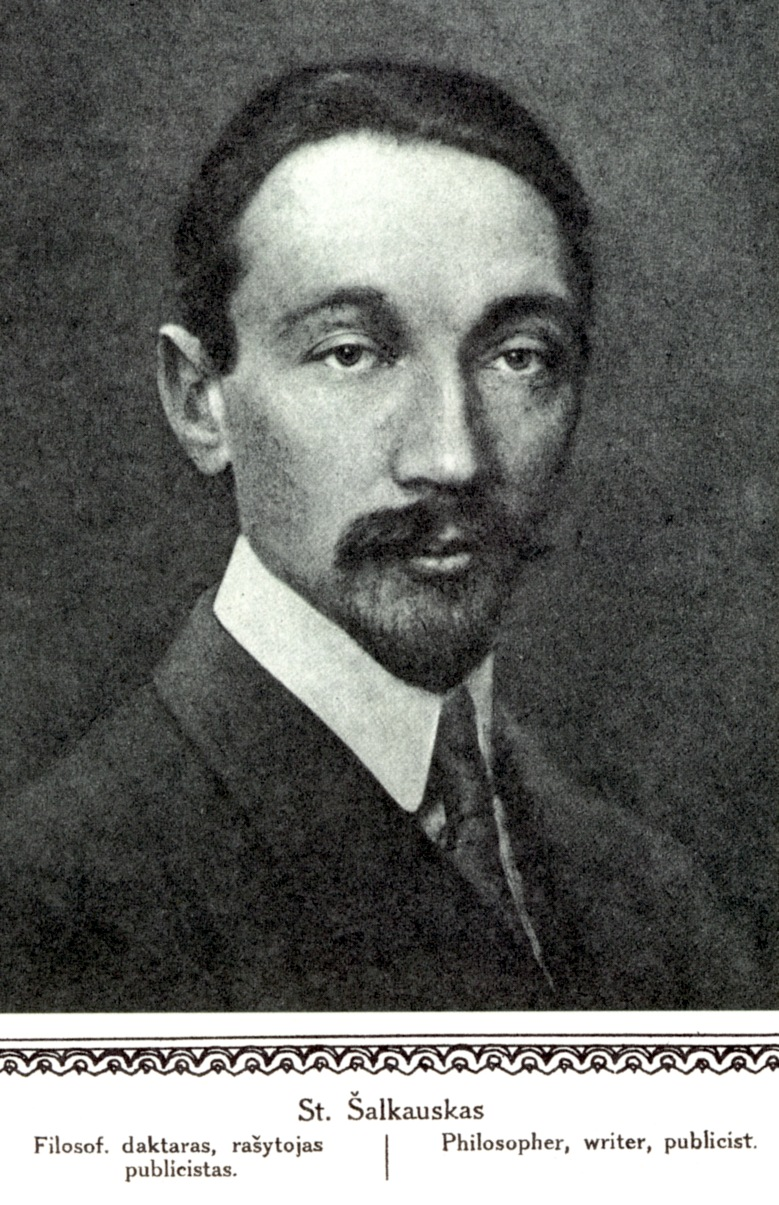
Šalkauskis in the Album of Lithuania in 1921

Stasys Šalkauskis (May 16, 1886 in Ariogala, Lithuania – December 4, 1941 in Šiauliai, Soviet Union) was a Lithuanian Catholic philosopher, educator, and rector of Vytautas Magnus University. The Stasys Šalkauskis Prize was established in 1991 to honor outstanding figures in science, art, and national culture from the Šiauliai region.

== Biography ==
Šalkauskis was born in Ariogala on May 16, 1886. His father Julijonas Šalkauskis was a doctor and the Mayor of Šiauliai from 1905 to 1915, while his mother Barbora was a Polish-speaking noble from the Goštautai family. The family's nine children, including Stasys, learned both Lithuanian and Polish languages.

Šalkauskis graduated from the Faculty of Law of Imperial Moscow University in 1911. During his studies in Moscow, he came to contact with nihilist and positivist philosophy prevalent in the faculty, which gave him a crisis of faith and encouraged him to seek answers in the Catholic faith. He then graduated from the University of Fribourg with a doctorate in philosophy in 1920.

He taught philosophy in Vytautas Magnus University from 1922 to 1940 and served as its rector from 1939 to 1940. In 1922, he was one of the founders of the Lithuanian Catholic Academy of Science and was elected as a member of its board. In university, he met one of his students, Julija Paltarokaitė, whom he married in 1927.

After the Soviet occupation of Lithuania, he was fired from his position in the university. By then, he was already in poor health and passed away in December 1941.

== Philosophy ==
=== Cultural philosophy ===
According to Šalkauskis, there exist three stages of life: nature, culture, and religion. Each higher stage of life is based on the lower one, completing, supplementing, and perfecting it. Nature and culture alone are unable to fulfill the deepest desires of man, hence the final goal of life is religion, whose purpose is a union of man and God. At the same time, true understanding of religion is impossible without a developed culture. Šalkauskis also drew a distinction between culture, which he identified as inner richness of personhood and humanity, and civilization, which is the material development of humanity.

=== Lithuanian cultural synthesis ===
Šalkauskis developed a theory of Lithuanian civilization as a synthesis between "Western" and "Eastern" cultures, which he first formulated in the 1917 essay "At the Border Between Two Worlds. A Synthetic Essay on the Problem of Lithuanian National Civilization" (Lithuanian: Ties dviejų pasaulių riba. Sintetinis esė apie lietuvių tautinės civilizacijos problemą) and developed further in his subsequent writings. According to Šalkauskis, the purpose of Lithuanian civilization is to "create a synthesis of two worlds" and this gives it a central role in European history. The content of this synthesis consists of the universalization of Eastern and Western culture, which in turn is related to the individualization of its form. According to Šalkauskis, the goal of Lithuanian intellectuals, whom he called the "organ of public understanding" of society, is to give Lithuanian culture universal content. In this context, Šalkauskis also outlined his own philosophical work program.

Šalkauskis' views on the importance of Lithuanian culture in European history have been compared to Polish messianism.

=== Nationalism ===
Šalkauskis based his concept of nationalism on Christian universalism and ardently criticised the chauvinism and "exclusivism" of the concepts of nationalism promoted by tautininkai ideologues and authors; this view was also informed by his bilingual upbringing. Because of this, he was criticized by Juozas Keliuotis during his life and by nationalist authors such as Vincas Žemaitis and Jonas Balys after his death, who accused him of overly criticizing nationalism.

== Politics ==
Šalkauskis' home was frequently visited by influential Christian Democratic political figures and intellectuals, among them bishop Kazimieras Paltarokas, former prime minister Pranas Dovydaitis, Pranas Kuraitis, Vasily Seseman, Vladimiras Šilkarskis, Lev Karsavin, Kazys Pakštas, Antanas Maceina, Juozas Eretas, Pranas Dielininkaitis and others. He avoided getting involved in political life, but in 1927, he became the chairman of the Lithuanian Catholic Federation "Ateitis", whom he led for three years.

Šalkauskis opposed the regime of Antanas Smetona. In 1935, he wrote a letter protesting against his introduction of an authoritarian regime in Lithuania. A year later, he lauded the proclamation "To the Creation of an Organic State" (Lithuanian: Į organiškos valstybės kūrybą), written by younger members of the Christian Democratic movement who opposed the authoritarian regime and proposed an alternate political system based on Christian principles.

=== "Full Democracy" ===
Šalkauskis developed a concept of "full democracy" (Lithuanian: pilnutinė demokratija) as an alternative to both authoritarianism and liberal democracy, founded upon Christian philosophy. Before his death, in 1941, he wrote a draft project for a "full democratic" constitution, titled "Dimensions of a New Order". The goal of "full democracy" is to encompass three fields of society - economy, culture and politics - in a democratic system through a three-house parliament. One of the three houses would be elected, one of the three would be formed through a corporatist system of representatives from various economic sectors, and one of the three would be formed from cultural autonomies. The project included a separation of powers between the legislature, the cabinet of ministers, the justice system, and the president. Only a draft was left behind by Šalkauskis before his death.

== Legacy ==
Šalkauskis is considered to be one of the most influential Christian philosophers in Lithuania. His philosophy was a major influence for Antanas Maceina and Juozas Girnius. He has been cited as an inspiration and influence by National Alliance founder and leader Vytautas Sinica.

== Works ==
- Bažnyčia ir kultūra (studija), 1913
- Kultūros filosofijos metmenys, 1926
- Bendrosios mokslinio darbo metodikos pradai, 1926, 1933
- Visuomeninis auklėjimas, 1932
- Ateitininkų ideologija, 1933
- Lietuvių tauta ir jos ugdymas, 1933
- Bendroji filosofijos terminologija, 1938
- Raštai [Writings], Vilnius, Mintis, 1990
- Rinktiniai raštai [Selected Writings]. Vilnius, Vaivorykštės, 1992
