= Juozas Jakštas =

Lithuanian historian

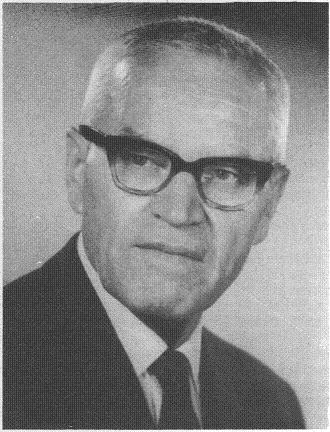
- Born: 9 September 1900; Slabada, Kovno Governorate, Russian Empire
- Died: 31 July 1989 (aged 88); Cleveland, Ohio, United States
- Education: Vytautas Magnus University
- Occupations: Historian, writer, publicist
- Writing career
- Subject: Lithuanian medieval history

Juozas Jakštas (9 September 1900 – 31 July 1989) was a Lithuanian medieval historian, author, and docent of Vytautas Magnus University. Jakštas was the first Lithuanian historian to propose that the Gediminids originated in Aukštaitija.

== Biography ==
Juozas Jakštas was born on 9 September 1900 in the village of Slabada in the modern-day Ukmergė district, then the Kovno Governorate of the Russian Empire. In 1928 he graduated from Vytautas Magnus University. He studied history abroad, in Berlin from 1929 to 1931 and in Vienna from 1934 to 1936. From 1932 to 1939 he was a lecturer in the Vytautas Magnus University. Upon the Soviet occupation of Lithuania, after which Lithuania received Vilnius from Poland, Jakštas lectured at Vilnius University from 1940 to 1943. He became a docent in 1940. In 1944 Jakštas fled Lithuania, and in 1949 he settled in the United States. From 1953 he edited what would become the Encyclopedia Lituanica's medieval section. From 1971 to 1982 he edited Lietuvių tautos praeitis (The Past of the Lithuanian Nation; published as Lithuanian Historical Review). From 1971 to 1983 Jakštas was the chairman of the Lithuanian Historical Society. He worked in a factory up until his death on 31 July 1989 in Cleveland, Ohio.

== Works ==
- Jogailos ir Vytauto kovos su Vokiečių ordinu (Jogaila's and Vytautas's Fight with the Teutonic Order), 1935
- Vokiečių ordinas ir Lietuva Vytenio ir Gedimino metu (The Teutonic Order and Lithuania During the Times of Vytenis and Gediminas), 1935
- Jogaila, 1935, (co-author)
- Lietuvos istorija (History of Lithuania), 1936, (co-author)
- Vakarų krikščionių mintys apie Romos imperiją iki V a. (Western Catholic Thoughts on the Roman Empire Until the 5th Century), 1937
- Žvilgsnis į Mažosios Lietuvos istoriografiją (A Look into the Historiography of Little Lithuania), 1968
- Lietuva (Lithuania), 1969, (co-author)
- Mažosios Lietuvos apgyvendinimas iki XVII a. pabaigos (Little Lithuania's Settlement Until the end of the 17th century), 1970
- Žinios apie Lietuvą prancūzų XIV a. autoriaus Pilypo de Mézières traktate (News on Lithuania in Philippe de Mézières's 14th Century Work), 1976
- Daktaras Jonas Šliūpas. Jo raštai ir tautinė veikla (Doctor Jonas Šliūpas. His writings and National Activities), 1979

== See also ==
- History of Lithuania
- Lithuanian Americans
