= Villa Lituania =

Building in Roma, Italy

- Click on the map for a fullscreen view

General information
- Location: Rome
- Coordinates: 41°55′06″N 12°30′56″E

Villa Lituania is a villa in Rome, Italy, at Via Nomentana 116. Located next to Villa Mirafiori, the former villa of Rosa Vercellana, it housed the Lithuanian embassy from 1933 to 1940. After the occupation of Lithuania, it was transferred to the Soviet Union in August 1940 and today it houses a consular section of the Embassy of Russia. After regaining its independence in 1990, Lithuania demanded to be compensated for the loss in 1940. After prolonged diplomatic negotiations, Italy and Lithuania agreed on compensation in February 2013. For Lithuania, it was the last unrecovered diplomatic property of the interwar republic.

== History ==
The villa, built by George Blunt Page (1857–1930), descendant of John Page and director of Banca Commerciale Italiana, and his wife Maria Luisa Roca (1881–1974), was known as Villa Maria Luisa or Villa Page and had a 9,000 m^{2} (97,000 sq ft) park. The building and park were designed by Pio Piacentini and his son Marcello Piacentini. Lithuanian ambassador Voldemaras Čarneckis, a close friend of the Page family, arranged a below-market rental of the villa and moved the Lithuanian embassy from its much smaller premises on Via Nicolò Porpora in 1933. In July 1937, Lithuania purchased the building for 3 million lire (one-third paid upfront, the rest by installments through 1952). In 1938, the embassy hosted a celebration of the 20th anniversary of Lithuania's independence which attracted 800 guests.

After Lithuania was occupied by the Soviet Union in June 1940, Lithuanian ambassador Stasys Lozoraitis did not recognize the new Soviet regime and continued to represent independent Lithuania. He refused to hand over the villa to Russian diplomats. He protested to the Italian Ministry of Foreign Affairs and attempted to transfer the property to the Lithuanian envoy to the Holy See, Stasys Girdvainis. After two months of diplomatic pressure, Lozoraitis moved out of the villa on August 26. Lithuanians took all movable property (archives, furniture, vehicles, etc.), cut electric wires, and even mowed flowers in the gardens. They left only a flag of Lithuania decorated with black ribbons.

In June 1941, after the German invasion of the Soviet Union, Russians became an enemy of Italy and had to abandon the villa leaving it under the protection of the Embassy of Sweden, as a representative of a neutral country. Seizing the opportunity, a group of Lithuanians returned to the villa and attempted to return it to the Lithuanian embassy. They found the villa in a deplorable state: chancellery was converted into two classrooms, all other rooms had beds and small corners for food preparation, ceiling suffered damage from a burst water pipe. The seizure of the building provoked protests from the Italian and Swedish diplomats, and Lithuanians left the villa the next day.

The Soviet Union made two installment payments (4.3% of the purchase price) before defaulting on the mortgage. The building was foreclosed by the bank and sold to a real estate company. The Italian government purchased the villa and transferred it to the Soviet Union in 1945.

In 1959, the Lithuanian Pontifical College established a guest house in Rome and named it Villa Lituania after the former embassy building.

After Lithuania regained independence in March 1990, Lithuanian diplomats and top-ranking state officials demanded that Italian authorities return the former legation building to Lithuania, or compensate the loss in cash or real estate. In 2007, Lithuanian artists Nomeda and Gediminas Urbonas presented an art project dedicated to Villa Lituania at Venice Biennale. After prolonged negotiations and several rejected proposals, Lithuania agreed to accept the fourth floor of Palazzo Blumenstihl in February 2013. The agreement is valid for 99 years and has a renewal option. The premises measure 700 m^{2} (7,500 sq ft) and are valued at 9 million euros. The Lithuanian embassy officially moved in to the building on March 28, 2019.
