= Naujasis Židinys-Aidai =

Aidai
- Discipline: Lithuanian language and culture
- Language: Lithuanian

Publication details
- History: 1944–present
- Frequency: monthly
- Open access: Archive online

Standard abbreviations
- ISO 4: Naujas. Židin.-Aidai

Indexing
- ISSN: 0002-208X

Links
- Journal homepage

Aidai and since 1992 Naujasis Židinys-Aidai (literally: Echoes and New Fireplace-Echoes) is a magazine about Lithuanian culture and literature. It was established in Munich, Germany, as a successor of the traditions of Naujoji Romuva and Židinys magazines published in interbellum Lithuania. Since 1992, Aidai is published monthly in Lithuania.

In 1949, the editorial staff moved to the United States. Around that time, the first articles about politics and society appeared. In 1953, the politics section was canceled. Among notable authors of the time were Kazys Bradūnas and Juozas Girnius. First it was published monthly, then it reduced publication to six times a year in 1982 and then to four times a year in 1986. After Lithuania regained independence the magazine moved back to Lithuania in 1992. Here it merged with Naujasis Židinys and was renamed to Naujasis Židinys-Aidai. In 1994, publishing house Aidai was established, publishing magazines and books.
