= Slabada =

Slabada, Lithuanian and Belarusian form of the word "Sloboda", probably from Polish "Słoboda". It may refer to:

== Lithuania ==
- lt:Slabada (Anykščiai)
- lt:Slabada (Juodupė)
- lt:Slabada (Kaišiadorys)
- lt:Slabada (Kazlų Rūda)
- Slabada, Kėdainiai
- lt:Slabada (Kelmė)
- lt:Slabada (Krekenava)
- lt:Slabada (Kupiškis)
- Slabada (Lavoriškės)
- lt:Slabada (Linkaučiai)
- lt:Slabada (Lyduokiai)
- lt:Slabada (Marijampolis)
- lt:Slabada (Medininkai)
- lt:Slabada (Molėtai)
- lt:Slabada (Obeliai)
- lt:Slabada (Panevėžys)
- lt:Slabada (Prienai)
- lt:Slabada (Šalčininkai)
- lt:Slabada (Šešuoliai)
- lt:Slabada (Šilutė)
- lt:Slabada (Švenčionys)
- lt:Slabada (Pabaiskas)
- lt:Slabada (Trakai)
- lt:Slabada (Vepriai)

== Belarus ==
- Slabada, Krupki District, agrotown
- Slabada, Slabada Selsoviet, Lyepyel District, agrotown
- Slabada, Mazyr District, agrotown
- Slabada, Slabada Selsoviet, Myadzyel District, agrotown
- Slabada, Shumilina District, agrotown
- Slabada, Azyarkaslabadski Selsoviet, Smalyavichy District, agrotown
- Slabada, Pekalina Selsoviet, Smalyavichy District, agrotown
- Slabada, Stowbtsy District, agrotown
- Slabada, Talachyn District, major rural settlement
- Slabada, Uzda District, agrotown
