= Antanas Vaičiulaitis =

Lithuanian writer (1906–1992)

- Born: June 23, 1906; Didieji Šelviai, Lithuania
- Died: August 22, 1992 (aged 86) (United States) Washington, D.C.
- Resting place: Vilkaviškis city cemetery, Vilkaviškis, Lithuania (reinterred 1999)
- Education: University of Lithuania (now Vytautas Magnus University)
- Occupations: Writer; translator; editor; diplomat
- Notable work: Valentina (1936)

Antanas Vaičiulaitis (June 23, 1906 – July 22, 1992) was a Lithuanian diplomat, writer, and translator. Vaičiulaitis started writing in the 1930s, creating works distinguished by his particularly bright humanistic worldview and attention to the aesthetic perfection of literary form. Vaičiulaitis is one of the most prominent representatives of Christian humanism in Lithuanian literature, comparable to such 20th-century French and Italian literary masters as André Maurois, François Mauriac, and Giovanni Papini. Through his stylistic refinement and Western creative orientation, he resembles Jurgis Savickis and Henrikas Radauskas, and like them, represents the mature and free artistic culture of independent Lithuania.

== Biography ==
Antanas Vaičiulaitis was born on June 23, 1906, in Didieji Šelviai, near Vilkaviškis, in the Suvalkija region, then part of Congress Poland. Antanas Vaičiulaitis graduated from the Vilkaviškis “Žiburio” Gymnasium. At the University of Lithuania, he studied Lithuanian and French language and literature, as well as pedagogy and psychology. He later pursued further studies in French literature at the universities of Grenoble and the Sorbonne.

Antanas Vaičiulaitis worked for the Lithuanian Telegraph Agency (ELTA). In early 1940, Lithuania’s foreign minister, Juozas Urbšys, appointed him to the diplomatic service at the Lithuanian mission to the Holy See in the Vatican. After the Soviet Union occupied Lithuania in 1940, he was unable to return to his homeland and after accepting an offer from Father J. Navickas, he moved to the United States.

Vaičiulaitis served as editor of "Studentų žodis" from 1934-1943 and later edited the journals "Vytis" and "Aidai" from 1950-1964.In Brooklyn from 1945-1947, he edited the weekly newspaper "Amerika."

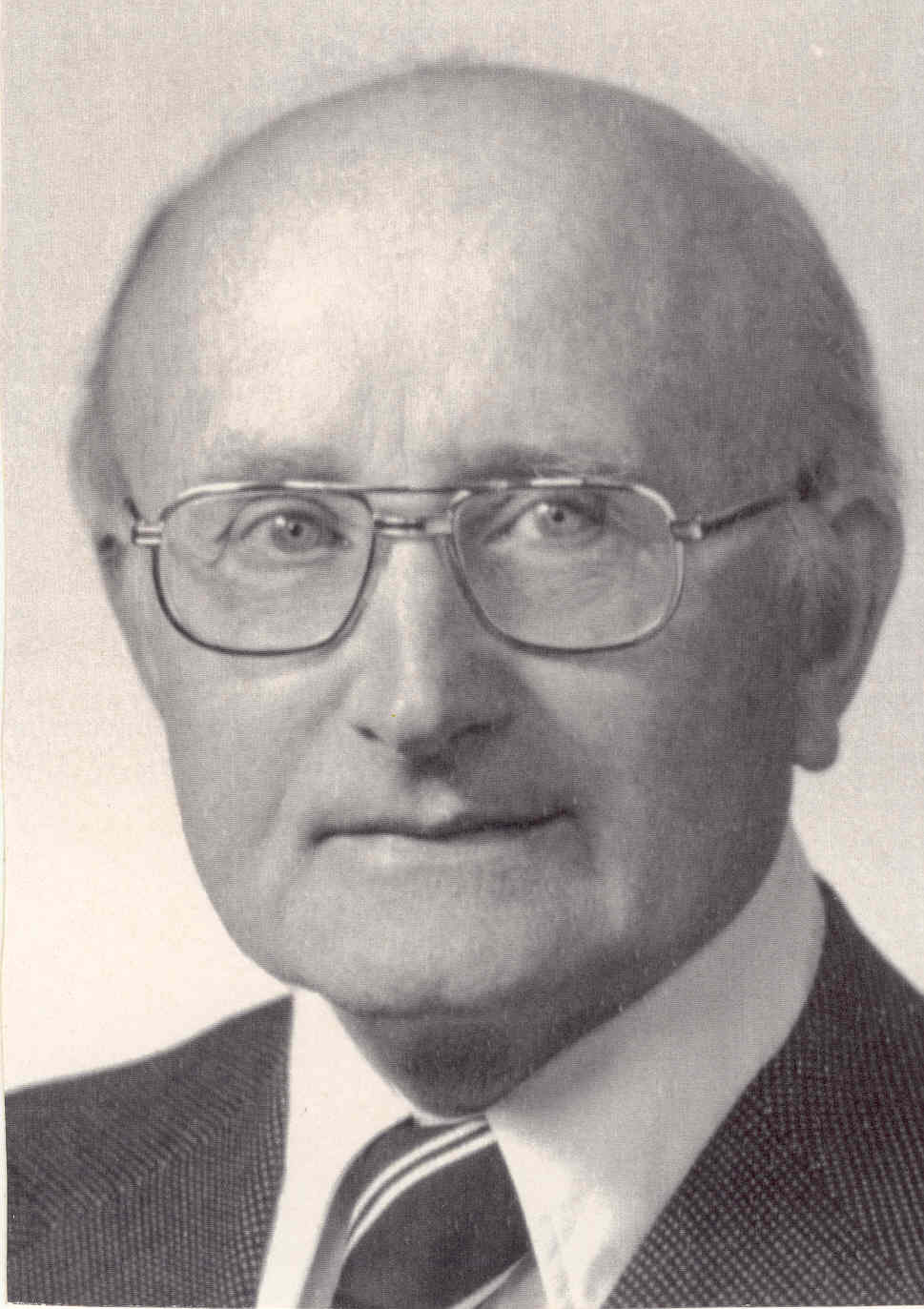
Vaičiulaitis in the 1980s

He taught at Marianapolis College in Thompson and studied English and American literature at Fordham University. He later taught French language and literature at the University of Scranton. He worked for 25 years at the Voice of America, first in New York and later in Washington, D.C. Vaičiulaitis contributed essays and travel sketches to the Lithuanian diaspora press. In November 1972 he published the piece “Terrecina” in Lietuvių dienos (Los Angeles).

== Works ==
- Vakaras sargo namely: (short stories) - 1932, 1944, 1976, 2006
- Vidudienis kaimo smuklėj: (short stories) - 1933
- Mūsų mažoji sesuo - 1936, 1970
- Valentina: (novel) - 1936, 1951, 1992
- Natūralizmas ir lietuvių literatūra - 1936
- Nuo Sirakūzų lig Šiaurės elnio: (travel writing) - 1937, 2014
- Pelkių takas: (short stories) - 1939
- Outline history of Lithuanian literature: (essays) - 1942
- La Literatura, Guardian de la Nation: (essays)- 1943
- Kur bakužė samanota: (historical fiction) - 1947
- Italijos vaizdai: (travel writing) - 1949, 2015
- Pasakojimai: (short story collection). - 1955
- Auksinė kurpelė: (folk tale collection). - 1957
- Noon at a country inn: (short story collection) / English translation by A.Baranauskas & others 1965
- Gluosnių daina: (legends) - 1966
- Apaštalų iškeliavimas - 1970
- Ir atlėkė volungė: (poetry) - 1980
- Vidurnaktis prie Šeimenos: (short stories) -1986
- Pasakos: (folk tale collection) - 1989
- Tavo veido šviesa: (short stories, legends, novel collection) - 1989
- Knygos ir žmonės: (essay collection) - 1992
- Popiežiaus paukštė: (short story collection) - 1996

== Awards and honors ==
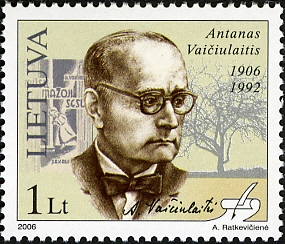

- Valentina won the Sakalas publishing house prize (1936).
- Reinterred in Vilkaviškis in 1999.
- Featured on a 1-litas Lithuanian postage stamp (Žymūs žmonės / Famous People series), issued 11 February 2006.
- Since 1994, the biennial "Antanas Vaičiulaitis Literary Prize" has been awarded for the best Lithuanian short prose published in Metai (established by Vilnius Pedagogical University, the journal Metai, and the Vaičiulaitis family).
