= Knights of Lithuania =

- Formation: April 27, 1913
- Type: patriotic and religious organization
- Website: knightsoflithuania.org

The Knights of Lithuania (Lithuanian: Lietuvos vyčiai) is a Lithuanian cultural organization in the United States, established in 1913 as the Lithuanian Falcons in an effort to develop conservative and patriotic values in Lithuanian-American youth. Changing its name to the current form after just one year, the Knights of Lithuania organization grew to peak in size and influence in the mid-1920s, when its membership approached 5,000 and its local councils exceeded 100. Decline soon followed, however, due to declining use of the Lithuanian language and loss of national consciousness among the American-born youth. Organization size was further impacted by the emergence of the Catholic Youth Organization in 1932.

Open to both women and men from its first years, as immigration from Lithuania halted and its membership grew older, the age requirements of the group's early days were dropped. Despite its numerical decline and evolution into an English-speaking organization, the Knights of Lithuania has nevertheless managed to survive into the 21st century, with a continued focus upon educational, cultural, and religious activities for Lithuanian-American young people.

== Organizational history ==
=== Establishment ===
The 1912 annual convention of the Lithuanian Catholic Alliance, held in Boston, Massachusetts, received a report by Mykolas Norkūnas calling for establishment of a new patriotic youth organization in an effort to combat a decline in national feeling, rise in ethnically-mixed marriages, and growing tendency towards political radicalism among Lithuanian-American youth. This call was subsequently echoed in the pages of the conservative Lithuanian-language press, gaining the support of a number of prominent Catholic leaders and further inspiring Norkūnas in his efforts.

A two-day convention was called at a church hall in Lawrence, Massachusetts for April 27–28, 1913, to launch a new Catholic organization along the lines advocated by Norkūnas. Ten delegates gathered and a new group was born, called the Lithuanian Falcons. A report on the new group was delivered to the 1913 congress of the Lithuanian Roman Catholic Federation, which approved the new group while recommending a name change to a more historically-oriented moniker, the Knights of Lithuania (see vytis). This change immediately followed.

The Knights of Lithuania grew significantly during its first year of existence, so that by the time of its 1914 convention there were a total of 12 local councils. A periodical was launched for distribution to the group's members, called Vytis (The Knight), with a pair of Lithuanian-American students handling the editorial duties. The bulk of original members of the organization were individuals in their teens and 20s.

=== Development ===
The Knights of Lithuania were established as an alternative social and cultural organization to the popular youth activities organized by the anti-religious Lithuanian Socialist Federation (Amerikos lietuvių socialistų sąjunga, ALSS) and were from its inception directed towards working class and lower-middle class Lithuanian-American youth. Comparatively few intellectuals were attracted to the organization during its early years. While professing Catholicism as a fundamental aspect of organizational identity, the group nevertheless was a product of the Catholic laity rather than the formal church apparatus and periodically local councils came into conflict with local parish priests, culminating with a short-lived effort in the 1920s for the organization of a new youth movement by the Lithuanian Priests' League.

The organization was open to both women and men and advanced a program of Lithuanian cultural identity, including the collection of funds for the Lithuanian national independence movement. Membership in the Knights of Lithuania was never large, peaking in the 1920s at approximately 4,500. American restrictions upon European immigration and the inevitable assimilation of American-born children of immigrants took their toll, and as early as 1923 the magazine of the organization, Vytis, began to publish a column in English.

Membership fell during the 1930s, with Lithuanian troops of the Boy Scouts of America and Lithuanian branches of the American Catholic Youth Organization competing with the Knights of Lithuania for members. Meetings of local councils increasingly began to be conducted in English as the proportion of Lithuanian-speaking members fell.

As many as 800 members of the organization entered the United States Armed Forces during World War II and the organization responded to the dwindling pool of available members in 1944 by expanding its age range, allowing the participation of older members. From the youth organization of its early years, the Knights of Lithuania transformed itself into a family organization as its membership aged, thereby helping it to retain critical mass for its survival.

The Knights of Lithuania considered cultural assimilation regrettable at best and advocated for ethnically pure marriages up to about 1950. It was only in 1959 that the organization's bias against inter-ethnic marriage appears to have been finally laid to rest through the introduction of associate memberships to the non-Lithuanian spouses of Knights of Lithuania members.

While these demographic changes negatively impacted the size of the organization and watered down its nationalistic orientation, it nevertheless survived as an educational and cultural entity, through the promotion of language training, choral and dramatic performances, craft displays, and ethnic dinners.

=== Contemporary activities ===
The Knights of Lithuania today provides college scholarships for many of its members and conducts periodic cultural events.

From July 25–28, 2013, the 100th Annual Convention of the Knights of Lithuania was held in Boston, celebrating a century of continuous existence. The gathering was attended by Deputy Chief of the Lithuanian Mission to the United States Simonas Šatūnas and by the Lithuanian General Consul in New York, Valdemaras Sarapinas.

The Knights of Lithuania continue to prosper and grow throughout the United States. Its most recent national convention, their 111th, was held in June of 2025 in Las Vegas, NV. Their 112th National Convention will be co-sponsored by Council 7 - Waterbury, CT and Council 141 - Bridgeport, CT from July 31, 2026 - August 2, 2026 in Southbury, CT.
