= Zenonas Ivinskis =

Lithuanian historian

Zenonas Ivinskis (25 May 1908 in Kaušėnai village, near Plungė – 24 December 1971 in Bonn, West Germany) was a noted Lithuanian historian.

== Education ==
Ivinskis studied at Telšiai and Plungė gymnasiums. In 1925, he entered the University of Lithuania to study philosophy, but later changed the subject to history. In 1929, Ivinskis received a grant to continue his studies in Germany. There, under the direction of prof. Albert Brackmann, he received a Ph.D. for his thesis Geschichte des Bauerstandes in Litauen (English: History of the Conditions of Lithuanian Farmers) in 1932. In 1933, in Gdańsk, he was habilitated for his work Lietuvių ir prūsų prekybiniai santykiai pirmojoje XVI a. pusėje (English: Lithuanian and Prussian trade in the first half of the 16th century).

After returning to Lithuania, he was drafted into the army. During his free time, he gave lectures at the Vytautas Magnus University and in 1940, he became an extraordinary professor. In that year, he was invited to work at Vilnius University. He served as the dean of Faculty of Theology–Philosophy at the Vytautas Magnus University from 1941 to 1942. For his active public defense of university autonomy, the Nazis listed him among other prominent public figures to be transferred to Stutthof concentration camp. Ivinskis was saved from death because he was ill, and was hospitalized for half a year.

== Emigration ==
In 1944, Ivinskis retreated to the West. Unlike most other Lithuanian refugees, he did not emigrate to the United States and chose to live in Germany. He gave lectures as Gastprofessor at Baltisches Forchungsinstitut in Bonn, and from 1963, he taught the history of Eastern Europe at Bonn University. The next year, he received his second habilitation in Lithuanian and Polish history and was appointed as a full-time professor. While living in Germany, he often traveled to Rome and conducted research at the Vatican archives. Ivinskis contributed to the Lithuanian encyclopedias published in Boston.

== Important works ==
- Geschichte des Bauerstandes in Litauen, Berlin 1933
- Lietuvių ir prūsų prekybiniai santykiai pirmojoje XVI a. pusėje (English: Lithuanian and Prussian trade in the first half of 16th century), 1933
- Šv. Kazimieras (English: Saint Casimir), 1955
- Vyskupas Merkelis Giedraitis ir jo laikų Lietuva (English: bishop Merkelis Giedraitis and Lithuanian of his time), manuscript based on research in Vatican archive
- Lietuvos istorija (iki Vytauto Didžiojo mirties) (English: History of Lithuania (until death of Vytautas the Great)), Rome 1978
