= Bernardas Brazdžionis =

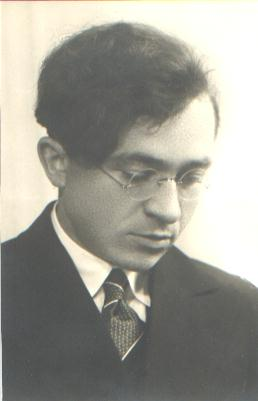
Bernardas Brazdžionis

Bernardas Brazdžionis (January 11, 1907 in Stebeikėliai – July 11, 2002 in Los Angeles) was a Lithuanian poet. He used various pen names, including Vytė Nemunėlis and Jaunasis Vaidevutis.

== Biography ==
Bernardas Brazdžionis was born in Stebeikėliai in 1907, however, after one year Brazdžionis' family emigrated to United States. Brazdžionis along with his family stayed in the US until 1914 when they returned to Lithuania. Brazdžionis finished Biržai gymnasium in 1929, soon after graduation, he enrolled at Vytautas Magnus University, which Brazdžionis finished in 1934. He was a member of the Catholic youth and student organization Ateitis.

Brazdžionis helped to edit various Lithuanian journals and papers, like Ateities spinduliai and Pradalgės. He also wrote critiques of various books. In 1939 Brazdžionis was awarded the State literature prize for his poetry book Kunigaikščių miestas. In 1944, Brazdžionis moved to Germany, where he lived until 1949. Brazdžionis finally settled in the US, actively participating in Lithuanian community activities. Patriotic songs based on his poems were performed during the Singing Revolution in Lithuania; the complete edition of Brazdžionis' poetry Poezijos pilnatis was sold with great success.

Brazdžionis died in Los Angeles, 2002 and in the same year was reburied in Kaunas Petrašiūnai Cemetery.
