= Ateitis =

Catholic youth organization based in Lithuania

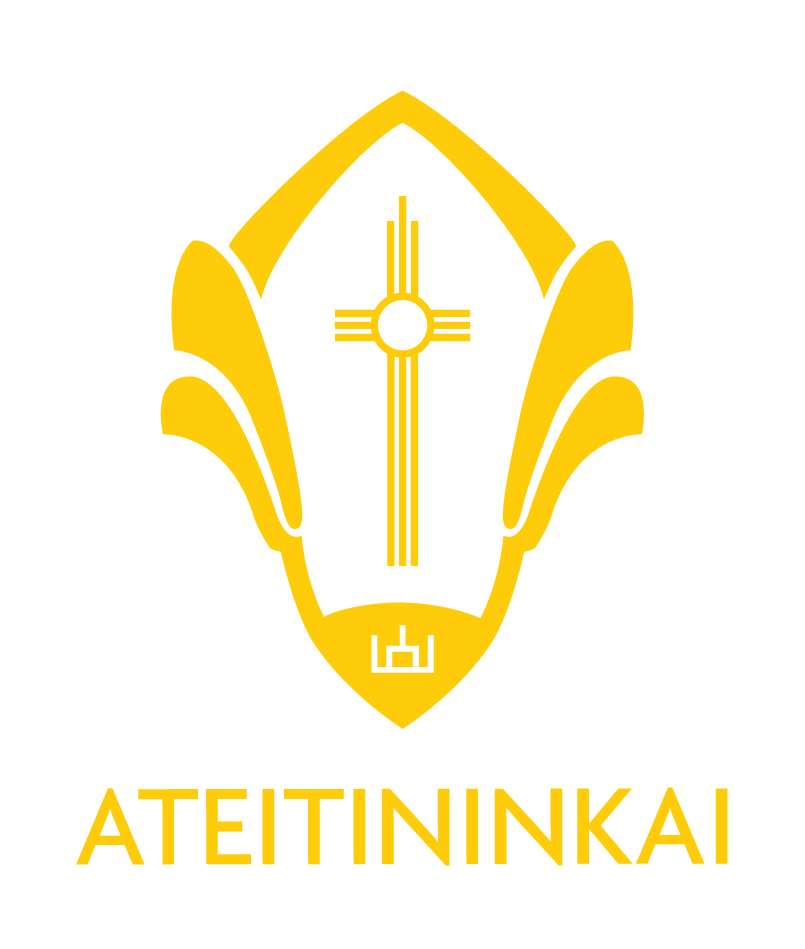
- Abbreviation: Ateitis
- Formation: February 19, 1910; 116 years ago
- Type: Lithuanian non-profit youth organization
- Purpose: Association of Catholic youth and student groups
- Headquarters: Kaunas, Lithuania
- Members: 3,000 members
- Website: www.ateitininkai.lt

The Lithuanian Catholic Federation Ateitis (literally, 'future') is a youth organization in Lithuania uniting Catholic-minded schoolchildren, university students, and alumni. Members of the Ateitis Federation are known as ateitininkai.

== Name and aims ==
The aim of Ateitis is the integral development of young people enabling them to be effective apostles of Christ and creative agents capable of changing society according to Christian values. For historical reasons another central aim is to preserve the national heritage and culture of Lithuania. The five principles of Ateitis are: Catholicism, community spirit, social responsibility, education and patriotism. The motto of Ateitis is To Renew All Things in Christ (Latin: Omnia Instaurare in Christo, Lithuanian: Visa atnaujinti Kristuje).

The Ateitis magazine is associated with the organization.

== Emblem ==
The emblem of Ateitis depicts a tulip that symbolizes spiritual youth. It consists of five petals representing the five principles. In the middle of the emblem is a cross, made up of three lines - that symbolize the three theological virtues of faith, hope, and love. In the center of the cross is a sun, which symbolizes the light of faith. At the bottom of the emblem is a semicircle representing the world. Further below are the Columns of the Gediminids, which symbolize Lithuania.

== History ==
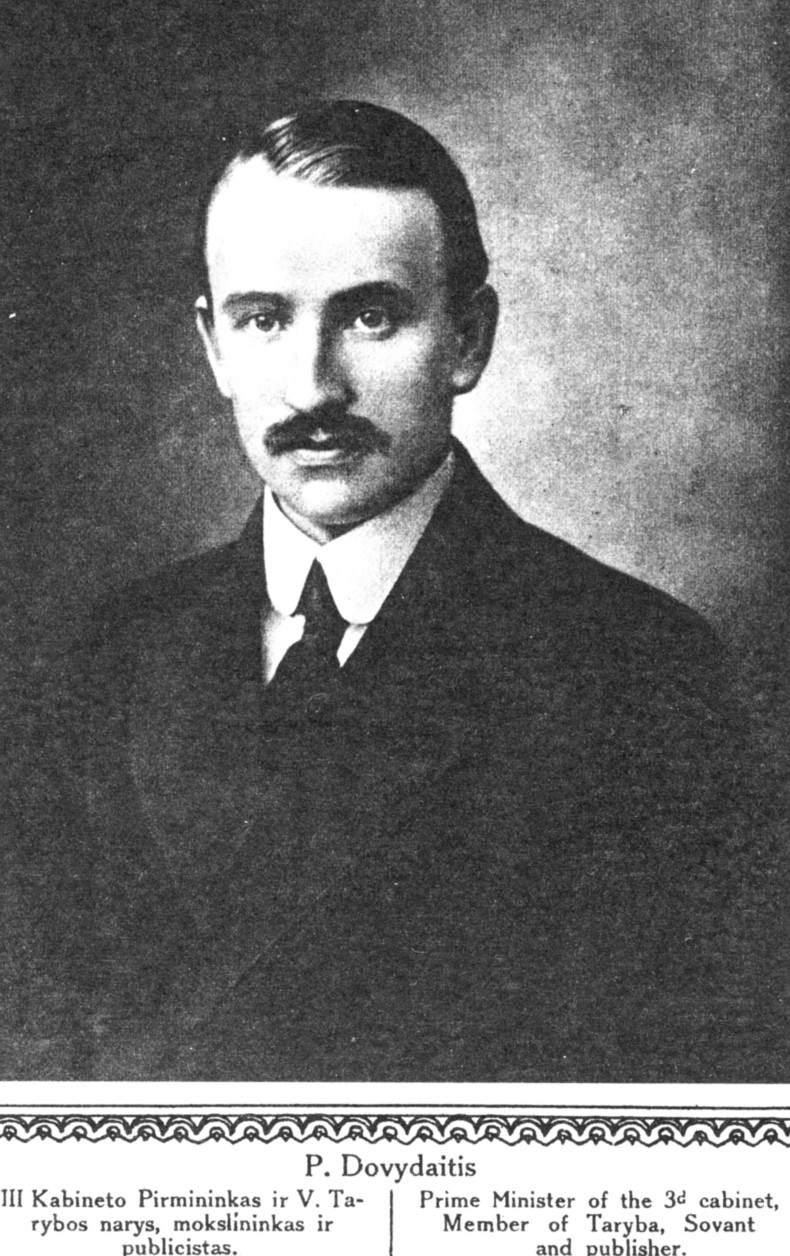
In February of 1911 Pranas Dovydaitis published the first edition of "Ateitis" and article "Three Fundamental Questions".

Ateitis was founded on February 19, 1910, the day on which the Executive Committee of the newly organized Lithuanian Catholic Student association was elected in the Catholic University of Louvain.

In 1927 during the Palanga Conference the Ateitis Federation was formed, uniting the then three associations (High School students, University students and alumni).

In the 1930s the authoritarian nationalist regime of President Antanas Smetona made it illegal to join Ateitis during the high school in order to slow down the growth of the organization, as many members of Ateitis later on had become leaders of the oppositional Christian Democratic Party.

During both Soviet occupations, the Ateitis Federation was considered anti-state. There was barely any presence of Ateitis in Lithuania during this period; however, many members of the organization fled to Western Europe and the US during and after the Second World War.

During the Lithuanian movement for Independence, the Assembly of Restoration occurred on November 25-26, 1989, in Vilnius, restoring the organization in Lithuania.

By 1998 the governing body of the Ateitis Federation had returned back to Lithuania, and in the following year was followed by the official journal Ateitis.

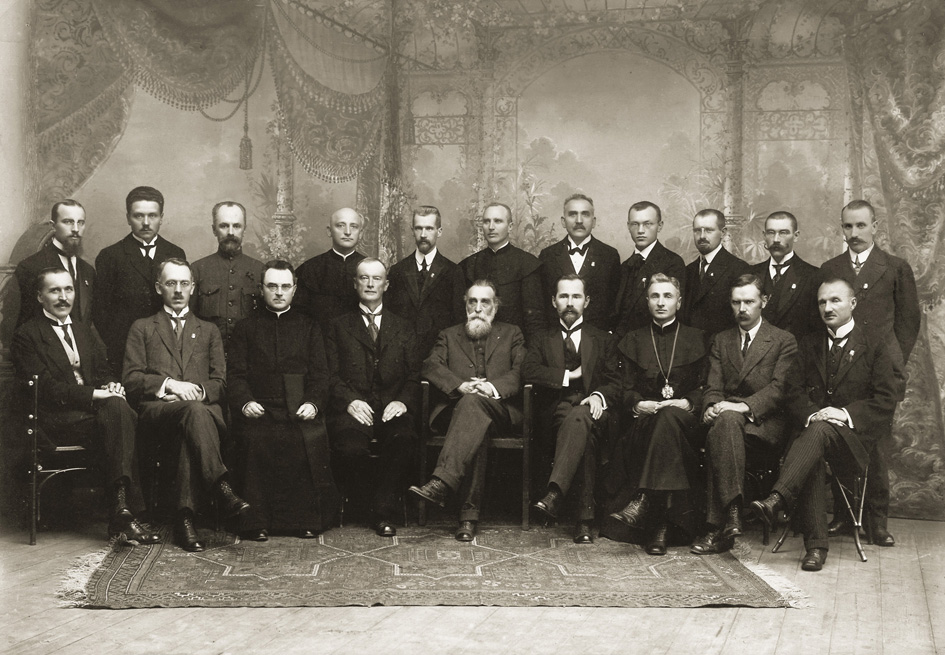
Of the 20 signatories of the 1918 Act of Independence, 3 were members of Ateitis. Standing left to right, Kazys Bizauskas is on the very left, Aleksandras Stulginskis is the third person from the right, and Pranas Dovydaitis is on the very right.

Ateitis is member of the international umbrella of Catholic youth organizations Fimcap since the General Assembly in Ghana in 2001. The first contact between Fimcap and Ateitis took place in Kehl, Germany, in 1999 during the Eurocontact seminar of Fimcap. After that, contacts between Fimcap and Ateitis became more frequent, ties grew stronger and this finally resulted in Ateitis being a full member of Fimcap.

== Principles ==
The Federation refers to five principles:

Catholicism: Part of the organization's identity is the common Catholic faith. This faith plays an active role in the lives of its members and forms the basis of the organization's ideology. Before and after many activities members often pray. Mass is also often celebrated together during camps, events, and various commemorations.

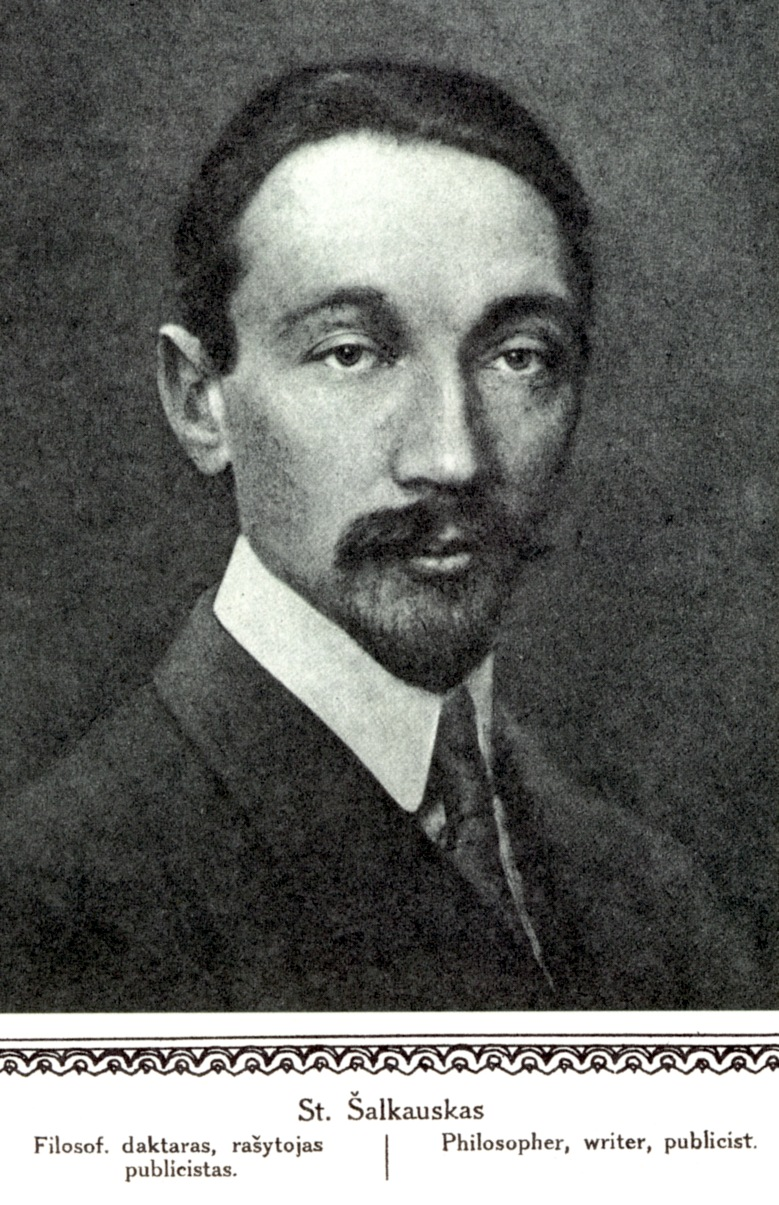
Stasys Šalkauskis - the father of the five principles of Ateitis

Patriotism: can be understood as the preservation and nurturing of Lithuanian cultural heritage. Among many things maintaining the Lithuanian language and Lithuania's national sovereignty. Over the history of the organization, its members have been involved in many of the main movements seeking to restore independence and defend Lithuania. Members often attend events that occur during national holidays and commemorations.

Family and Community: It is also vital that members make a special effort to maintain a good relationship with their own family and with other members of the association. Members are encouraged to be faithful Catholics in their respective homes and seek to instill the faith in their children.

Academic tradition: Ateitis has maintained an academic tradition with its various events. For example, during school holidays, Academies are organized, where participants delve deeper into a given topic by listening to various lectures. It is also encouraged to be curious about various cultural, apologetic and scientific topics.

Community spirit: Under the motto: "To renew all things in Christ" the Federation aims to play an active role in society and be a force for positive change. For example, during the Advent season, the Ateitis Association of High School Students organizes a charity to raise money for various causes.

== Philosophy and Identity ==
While the five principles are defined in terms of member activities and organisational aims, the federation's leadership has elaborated on their deeper meaning and the relationship between them.

=== Hierarchy of principles ===
Catholicism is regarded as the primary principle, taking precedence over the other four. The federation's leadership has emphasised that universal Christian solidarity can take precedence over national or regional belonging, and that Ateitis members may find more in common with Catholics in Africa or Asia than with secular compatriots. General Secretary Ignas Kriaučiūnas has noted that this hierarchy was evident at international FIMCAP events, where representatives from Central and Eastern Europe and from African and Asian countries were often the most natural allies on questions of religious identity.

=== Nationality as civic rather than ethnic ===
The principle of nationality has evolved in meaning across different periods of the organisation's history. In the early 20th century its emphasis was on building a distinct Lithuanian national state. During the post-World War II diaspora, as the governing body relocated to North America, it served primarily to preserve Lithuanian identity abroad. The organisation's leadership has clarified that belonging to the nation is understood in terms of contribution to its common good rather than ethnic origin, a position informed by Catholic universalism. Kriaučiūnas has illustrated this by noting that a foreign-born priest devoted to Lithuania's spiritual welfare may embody the nationality principle more fully than many native Lithuanians.

=== Active resistance over passive preservation ===
The organisation's leadership has described the principles not as a passive cultural inheritance but as a framework for active engagement. Kriaučiūnas has argued that what sustained the federation's religious identity through the Soviet period was "not passive preservation but active resistance" against Soviet communism, a spirit the organisation continues to cultivate. This position stands in contrast to arguments that Lithuanian religiosity was simply an artifact of Soviet-era social freezing, and that secularisation is merely delayed rather than avoided — a theory the federation's leadership explicitly rejects.

== Associations ==
The Ateitis Federation is divided into 4 Associations by age group. Each association has a separate governing body, the Board, elected by the association members during an assembly, which is responsible for coordinating the activities of each association.

== Ateitis Association of Primary School Students ==
The Ateitis Association of Primary School Students brings together Catholic-minded schoolchildren aged 7-14. The Association aims to enable young people to develop and to participate actively in the cultural, social, and religious life of society. In pursuing this goal, the Association follows the same five principles as the other associations.

Every summer a 10-day summer camp is organized in Berčiūnai. During the camp, they have informal education activities, catechesis, and daily Mass alongside playful evening programs.

== Ateitis Association of High School Students ==
The Ateitis Association of High School Students is an organization of Catholic students that participates in social, cultural, and religious life. Its academies, courses, camps, and activities support Catholic faith, reinforce values, encourage regard for homeland and neighbor, and promote education. Lectures, discussions, and seminars cover various topics and develop logical thinking and communication skills. During trips, holidays, and games, members interact and cooperate. Members participate in organization activities.

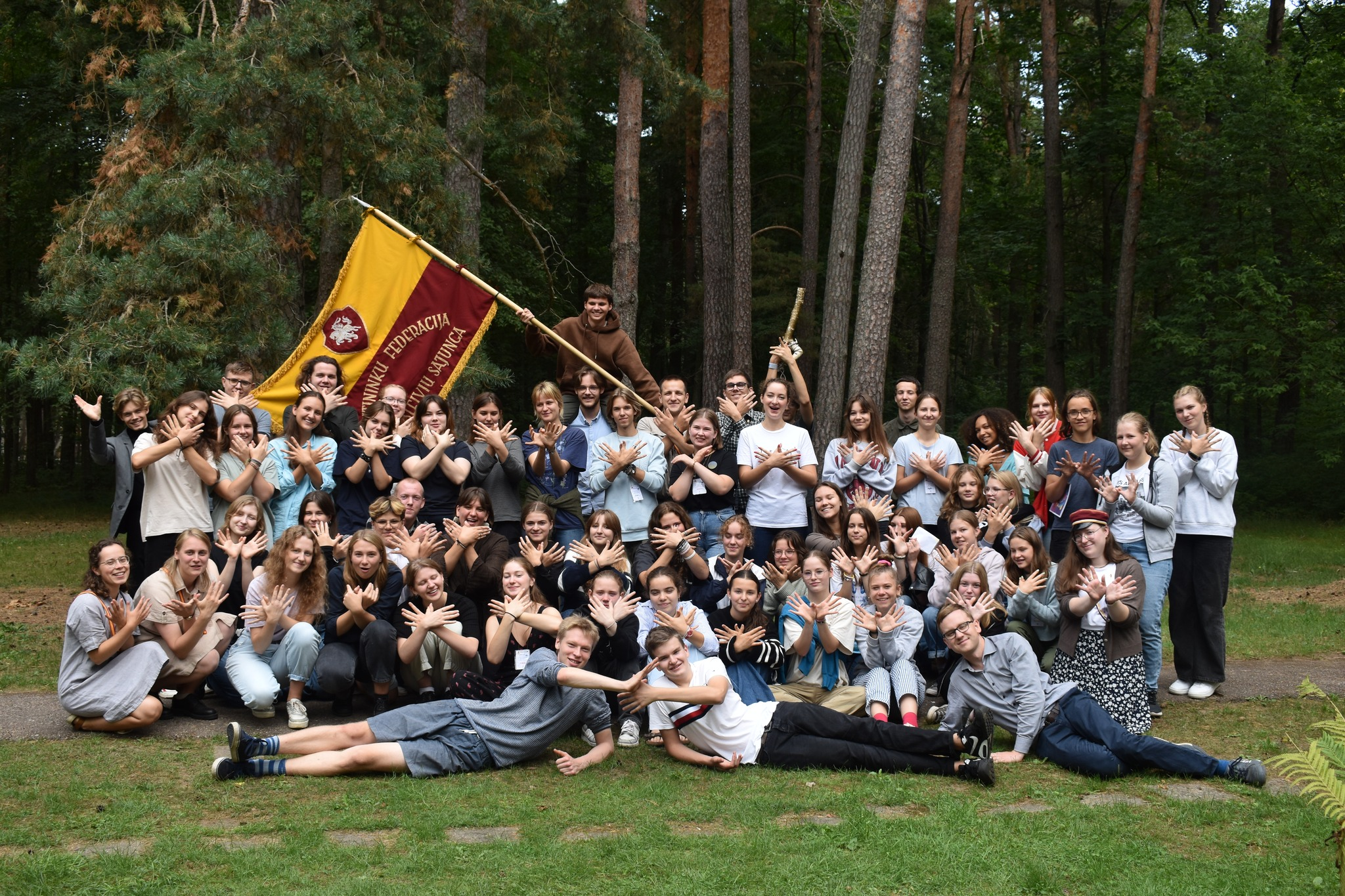
A photo of the participants and organizers during an academy

== Ateitis Association of University Students ==
The day-to-day activities of university student members of Ateitis take place in individual groups on campus or in the city as a whole, where they meet regularly to discuss issues of worldview and social concern.

The Ateitis Association of University Students also organizes the traditional winter and summer University Student Academies of Ateitis (SAŽA and SAVA), courses on the ideology of Ateitis, theology, and conferences. University Students are also the main organizers of camps for the members of the Youth and High School associations of Ateitis.

In addition, the Ateitis Association of University Students expresses its positions on topical issues (e.g. the reform of higher education).

== Ateitis Alumni Association ==
This Association is made up of members who have completed their education and who help educate younger members. They are often invited to read lectures and also provide assistance wherever needed.

== Chairmen ==
- Arvydas Petras Žygas (1989-1997)
- Vygantas Malinauskas (1997-2000)
- Vidas Abraitis (2000-2003)
- Liutauras Serapinas (2003-2006)
- Vygantas Malinauskas (2006-2010)
- Rozvita Liūdžiūtė-Vareikienė (2010-2014)
- Vaidotas Vaičaitis (2014-2018)
- Justinas Juknys (2018-2020)
- Vytis Turonis (2020-2024)
- Gediminas Plečkaitis (2024- )

== Spiritual leaders ==
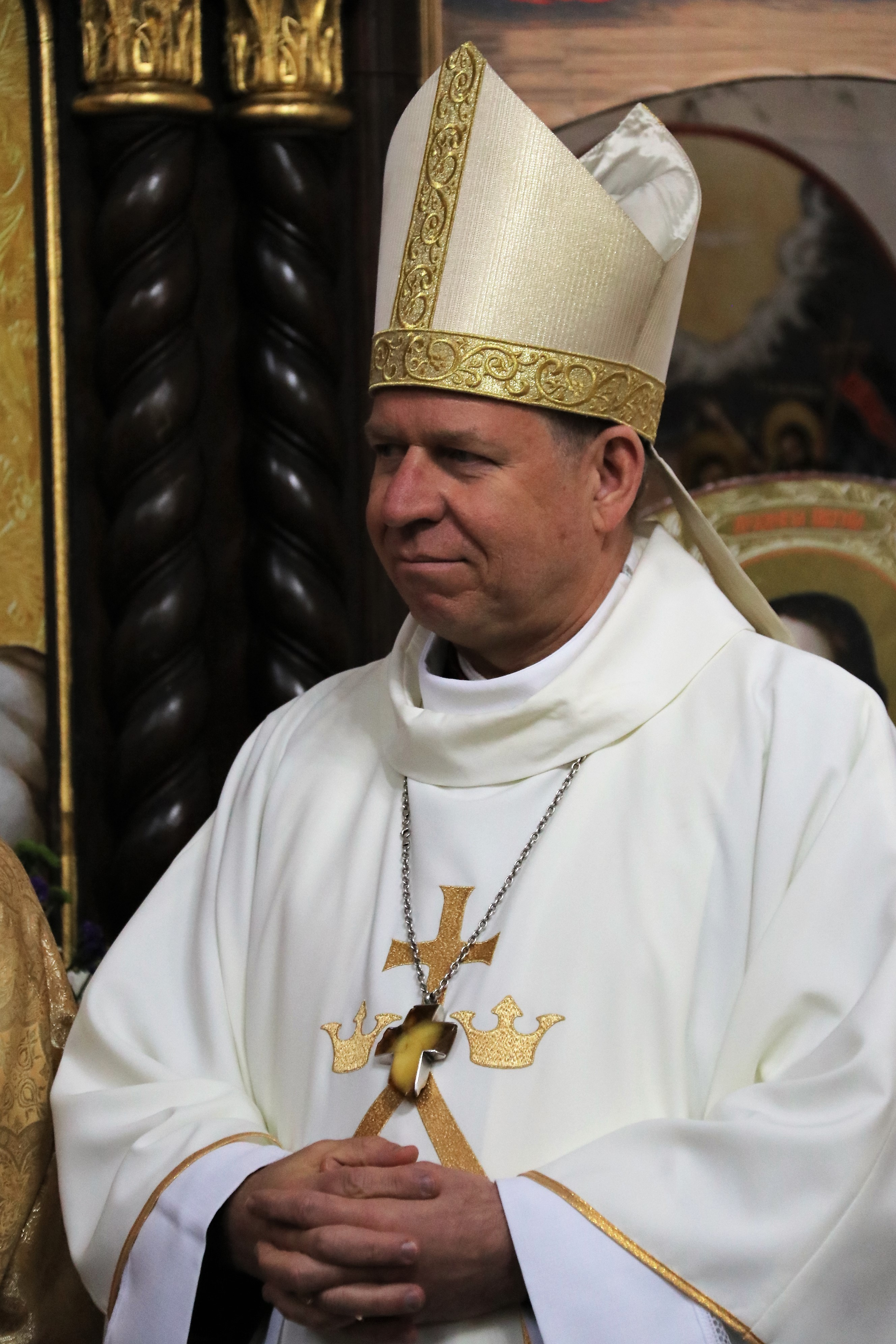
Gintaras Grušas currently serves as the Spiritual Leader of the Ateitis Federation.

- Pranas Kuraitis (1927–1940)
- Jonas Gutauskas (1946–1952)
- Viktoras Gidžiūnas MIC (1952–1959)
- Jonas Kidykas SJ (1959–1963)
- Stasys Yla (1963–1983)
- Valdemaras Cukuras (1963–1983)
- Vaclovas Aliulis MIC (1989–1992)
- Sigitas Tamkevičius SJ (1996–2000)
- Jonas Kauneckas (2000–2006)
- Gintaras Grušas (2006 - )

== Notable members ==
- Kazys Bobelis (1923–2013): Lithuanian surgeon and politician, member of the Seimas
- Vytautas Bogušis (born 1959): dissident and politician, member of the Seimas
- Bernardas Brazdžionis (1907–2002): poet
- Pranas Dovydaitis (1886–1942): university professor and politician, Prime Minister of Lithuania
- Vladas Jurgutis (1885–1966): cleric and politician, professor, Foreign Minister of Lithuania, member of the Seimas, first chairman of the Bank of Lithuania
- Aleksandras Stulginskis (1885–1969): President of Lithuania
- Sigitas Tamkevičius SJ (born 1938): Archbishop of Kaunas
- Gintaras Grušas (born 1961): Archbishop of Vilnius
- Stasys Šalkauskis (1896-1941): Lithuanian philosopher, educator, rector of Vytautas Magnus University
- Kazys Pakštas (1883-1964): geographer and political theorist
- Leonas Prapuolenis:(1913-1972): leader of the 1941 Lithuanian Uprising, economist
- Antanas Maceina (1908-1987): philosopher, theologian, educator, poet
- Vytautas Mačernis (1921-1944): poet
- Juozas Lukša-Daumantas (1921-1951): Lithuanian partisan
