= Pranas Dovydaitis =

Lithuanian politician (1886–1942)

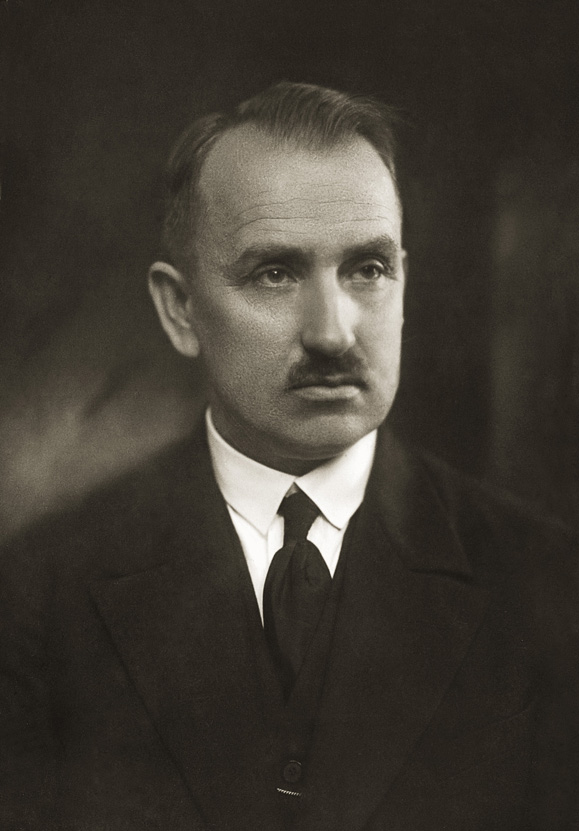

3rd Prime Minister of Lithuania
- In office 12 March 1919 – 12 April 1919
- President: Antanas Smetona
- Preceded by: Mykolas Sleževičius
- Succeeded by: Mykolas Sleževičius

Personal details
- Born: 2 December 1886 Runkiai, Suwałki Governorate, Congress Poland
- Died: 4 November 1942 (aged 55) Sverdlovsk, Russian SFSR
- Party: Lithuanian Christian Democratic Party
- Education: Veiveriai Teachers' Seminary; Imperial Moscow University

Pranas Dovydaitis (2 December 1886 – 4 November 1942) was a Lithuanian politician, Prime Minister of Lithuania, teacher, encyclopedist, editor, and professor.

== Biography ==
Pranas Dovydaitis was born in Marijampolė County, Runkiai, and attended Veiveriai Teachers' Seminary, later studying at the Imperial Moscow University. In 1913, he became an editor of the newspaper Viltis in Vilnius. It was closed in 1915 and Dovydaitis went to Kaunas, where he started to participate actively in its academic circles, and from 1922 to 1940, he was a professor at the University of Lithuania (now - Vytautas Magnus University). The range of topics of his articles was quite wide - religious science, philosophy and natural science, but in all his articles, some synoptical-historical interest could be found. The topics of primitive man and culture were one of his priorities. He was a Signatory of the Act of Independence of Lithuania. After the Soviet occupation of Lithuania, Dovydaitis was arrested in 1941 with his family and sent to one of the Soviet Gulag camps in the northern Ural. His remains have not yet been found. Dovydaitis was a member and one of the founders of the Catholic youth and student organization Ateitis in Lithuania, which is now a full member of Fimcap.

== Family ==
Pranas Dovydaitis was the eldest of 15 children in his family. His wife was Marcelė Bucevičiūtė-Dovydaitienė. They had three sons and two daughters.

| Preceded by Mykolas Sleževičius | Prime Minister of Lithuania; 12 March 1919 – 12 April 1919 | Succeeded by Mykolas Sleževičius |
