= Antanas Maceina =

Antanas Maceina (27 January 1908 – 27 January 1987) was a Lithuanian philosopher, existentialist, educator, theologian, and poet.
