= Šatrija art circle =

Lithuanian art society

- Formation: 1926
- Headquarters: Kaunas, Vilnius, Chicago

The Šatrija art circle was a Lithuanian art society focused primarily on literature. It was established in 1926 by various students belonging to the Ateitis movement (ateitininkai). Its component members included some of the most notable intellectuals of Lithuanian literature. It was also contemporary to other movements like the Žemininkai and Trečiafrontininkai.

== History ==
=== Founding ===
The origins of the circle date back to literary gatherings hosted by Juozas Eretas and Vincas Mykolaitis-Putinas from 1924 to 1926. Putinas sought to create a more liberal alternative to the conservative line of the faculty of theology-philosophy and Lithuanian Catholic culture in general. In 1924 Putinas told Juozas Paukštelis and Ignas Petrušaitis to gather various literates. The gatherings would include the reading of original fiction, translations, and literary criticism. They would take place in nature, in universities, and sometimes in Putinas's apartment. The gatherings lacked formality and strict convention, as the members feared it would impact creative thinking.

The Šatrija art circle itself was established in 1926. It was made official by the senate of the Vilnius University on 10 March 1927. The name was chosen by Putinas as well, in reference to the writer Šatrijos Ragana. An official celebration of the group was first organized on 29 May 1927 in a manor near Kaunas, in which everybody received special caps, seen usually in photos taken of the group. The chairman of the group was chosen to be Petrušaitis, and Putinas would be an honorary member and also patron of the group. Literature and academic life, as well as Catholic culture and aesthetic modernism (avant-garde, neo-romanticism, existentialism) were present in the works of the members. Members would also usually discuss classical music by Haydn, Mozart, and Beethoven.

=== First generation ===
The first generation of the circle included students of the Vytautas Magnus University and its faculties of humanitarian sciences and theology-philosophy, such as Juozas Brazaitis, Bernardas Brazdžionis, Jonas Grinius, Juozas Grušas, Petras Karuža, Juozas Keliuotis, Salomėja Neris, Petronėlė Orintaitė, Juozas Paukštelis, Vincas Ramonas, Alfonsas Šešplaukis-Tyruolis, Antanas Vačiulaitis, and Kazys Zupka. Members would publish their works in newspapers. Due to some inner conflict, the circle became largely inactive in 1932, due in part to Putinas stepping down as patron.

=== Second generation ===
Around 1937 a newer generation of students, also called the Žemininkai, emerged, such as Kazys Bradūnas, Česlovas Grincevičius, Mamertas Indriliūnas, Bronius Krivickas, Paulius Jurkus, Eugenijus Matuzevičius, Alfonsas Nyka-Niliūnas, Antanas Strabulis, and Leonardas Žitkevičius. During World War II meetings would take place in Vilnius University. Putinas would sometimes call six members to his home to discuss not only political relevancies but also the aesthetics of art. Putinas especially held Vytautas Mačernis, Mamertas Indriliūnas, and Bronius Krivickas in high regard. These meetings would stop in 1944.

=== In exile ===
In 1947 the art circle was restored in Germany under the initiative of Vincas Kazokas and Antanas Maceina, as well as others. In 1952 it was opened in Chicago. In the United States the activity of the group continued, with new members such as Vakarė Aistytė, Elenutė Braidūnaitė, Aleksandras Pakalniškis, Laima Underytė, Laima Nainytė, Stasys Rastonis, and Jurgis Bradūnas joining the circle. Like its predecessor, the members would share their creative work with each other.
