= Vytautas Mačernis =

Lithuanian writer

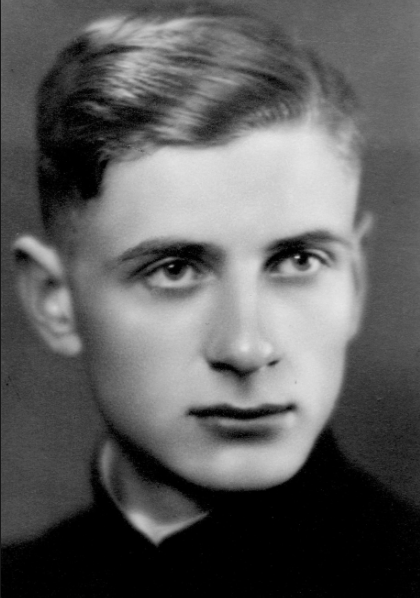
- Vytautas Mačernis in 1939
- Born: 5 June 1921; Šarnelė, Lithuania
- Died: 7 October 1944 (aged 23); Žemaičių Kalvarija, Reichskommissariat Ostland
- Cause of death: Killed by a splinter of an artillery projectile explosion
- Resting place: Šarnelė
- Occupation: Poet
- Parents: Vladislovas Mačernis (father); Elžbieta Mačernienė née Vičiulytė (mother)

Vytautas Mačernis (5 June 1921 – 7 October 1944) was a Lithuanian existentialist poet.

== Biography ==
Vytautas Mačernis was born in the village of Šarnelė (present-day Plungė district municipality) to Vladislovas Mačernis and Elžbieta Mačernienė née Vičiulytė. He was the second eldest among his thirteen siblings (of whom six died in early childhood). His father, a nobleman, was killed by a bull. Mačernis grew up in his home village, where he wrote most of his poems. His grandmother, who died in 1944, appears in most of his poems as a warm and pleasant memory, as the poet's relationship with his grandmother was much closer than that with his mother.

While studying at the Seda Gymnasium, Mačernis belonged to the Ateitininkai movement. After graduating in 1935, Mačernis continued his education in Telšiai Žemaitė Gymnasium. During these years, Mačernis began writing poems. His biographers describe his personality as withdrawn and thoughtful. In 1939 Mačernis graduated and began studying English language and literature at the University of Lithuania in Kaunas, the temporary capital of Lithuania. Mačernis especially liked the poetry of Edgar Allan Poe. He also belonged to the Šatrija art circle.

After Lithuania was annexed by the Soviet Union in 1940, Mačernis began studying at the University of Vilnius. He later studied philosophy. Here he met future historian Bronė Vildžiūnaitė (1920–2022). They planned on marrying, but the marriage was rejected by Vildžiūnaitė's mother. Mačernis attended lectures related to Lithuanistics, as well as those delivered by Vincas Krėvė and Vincas Mykolaitis-Putinas. Mačernis took part in seminars headed by Balys Sruoga. Mačernis also worked as a guide of the Vilnius Old Town. In 1943, when the university was shut down during Nazi occupation, he went back to his home village of Šarnelė, where he self-studied astronomy and physics, translated the works of Oscar Milosz, and studied French, having had plans to study at the University of Paris. While in his home village, Mačerrnis was preparing to write his thesis on the relationship between Friedrich Nietzsche and Jesus Christ. Mačernis was keen on languages and could, apart from his native Samogitian and Standard Lithuanian, speak German, English, French, Italian, Russian, Latin, and Greek languages.

Mačernis was preparing to leave Šarnelė due to the increasing approach of the Soviet front. However, he died on 7 October 1944 after a splinter of artillery projectile explosion hit his head. He was buried on a hill near the village.

== Works ==
The only completed work of Mačernis, a cycle of poems entitled Vizijos, was written in 1939–1942. Despite that, Mačernis is regarded as a classic writer in Lithuanian literature. In Vizijos, Mačernis accents the homeland as a person's most important spiritual pillar, the value of which is understood only after leaving it. Mačernis's sonnets and triolets are marked by strict logical connections and abstract concepts. Most of Mačernis's poems deal with the stoicism and skepticism of a person in front of the metaphysical absurd.

Mačernis's works were not published until 1970 due to prohibition. Despite that, Mačernis's legacy was taken care of by contemporary émigré poets by Alfonsas Nyka-Niliūnas, Kazys Bradūnas, and others.
