= List of Lithuanian diplomats (1940–1990) =

List of Lithuanian diplomats includes Lithuanian diplomats that continued to represent independent Lithuania after it was occupied by the Soviet Union in June 1940.

United States did not recognize the Soviet annexation as legitimate according to the long-standing Stimson Doctrine. The Welles Declaration of July 23, 1940, applied the doctrine to the Baltic situation. Many western countries followed the American example and did not recognize the occupation. This formed the basis for the state continuity of the Baltic states and enabled Lithuanian diplomats stationed in various embassies and consulates continue their work on behalf of the independent Lithuania until the collapse of the Soviet Union in August 1991.

== Locations before the occupation ==
According to the Ministry of Foreign Affairs, as of 1 January 1939, Lithuania had 14 legations (London, Paris, Berlin, Washington, D.C., Moscow, Rome, Holy See, Brussels, Buenos Aires, Riga, Tallinn, Geneva (to the League of Nations), Prague, and Warsaw), eight general consulates (New York, Copenhagen, Toronto, Königsberg, Zürich, Rotterdam, Tel Aviv, Klaipėda), six consulates (Chicago, São Paulo, Riga, Daugavpils, Liepāja, Tilsit), seven honorary general consulates, 33 honorary consulates, and six honorary vice-consulates.

In fall 1940, the Lithuanian diplomatic service had five legations (Washington, D.C., London, the Holy See, Geneva and Buenos Aires), two general consulates (New York and Tel Aviv), and three consulates (Chicago, São Paulo, and Harbin). By the time Lithuania declared independence in March 1990, it was left with three legations and two consulates.

== List ==
Location	Function	Name	Notes
Chief of Diplomacy		Stasys Lozoraitis (1940–1983†); Stasys Antanas Bačkis (1983–1991)	
Washington, D.C., United States	Embassy	Povilas Žadeikis (1934–1957†); Juozas Kajeckas (1957–1976); Stasys Antanas Bačkis (1976–1987); Stasys Lozoraitis Jr. (1987–1993)	
London, United Kingdom	Embassy	Bronius Kazys Balutis (1934–1967†); Vincas Balickas (1967–1993)	
Holy See, Vatican	Embassy	Stasys Girdvainis (1939–1970†); Stasys Lozoraitis Jr. (1970–1992)	
Geneva/Bern, League of Nations	Embassy	Jurgis Šaulys (1939–1946)	League of Nations was dissolved in 1946.
Buenos Aires, Argentina	Embassy	Kazimieras Graužinis (1939–1947)	Moved to Montevideo, Uruguay, after Argentina established diplomatic relations with the Soviet Union in June 1946.
Montevideo, Uruguay	Embassy	Kazimieras Graužinis (1947–1961); Anatolijus Grišonas (1961–1977†)	Moved from Buenos Aires. Graužinis suffered a heart attack in 1961 and died in 1962. Closed when no replacement could be found for Grišonas.
Rio de Janeiro, Brazil	Embassy	Fritz J. Meier (1941–1961)	Opened and appointed after the occupation. Closed after Brazil established diplomatic relations with the Soviet Union in November 1961. Unofficially continued until Meier's death in 1967.
New York City, United States	General consulate	Jonas Budrys (1936–1964†); Vytautas Stašinskas (1964–1967†); Anicetas Simutis (1967–1994)	
Tel Aviv, Mandatory Palestine	General consulate	Nachmanas Rachmilevičius (1935–1942†); Geršonas Valkauskas (1942–1947)	Closed when Mandatory Palestine revoked recognition of Lithuanian diplomats in February 1947.
Chicago, United States	(Honorary) Consulate	Petras Povilas Daužvardis (1937–1971†); Juzefa Daužvardienė (1971–1985); Vaclovas Kleiza (1985–1998)	After Daužvardis' death in 1971, his wife Juzefa was recognized as General Honorary Consul. She did not have Lithuanian citizenship, thus could not be General Consul. She resigned in 1985 due to poor health and was replaced by General Honorary Consul Kleiza.
Harbin, Manchukuo	Consulate	Eduardas Jatulis (1939–1945)	Continued to function until the Soviet invasion of Manchuria.
São Paulo, Brazil	Consulate	Aleksandras Polišaitis (1938–1961)	Closed after Brazil established diplomatic relations with the Soviet Union in November 1961. Unofficially continued until Polišaitis' death in 1966.
Note: † symbol indicates person's year of death

== See also ==
- List of Lithuanian diplomats (1918–1940)

== Bibliography ==
- Blasier, Cole (1988). The Giant's Rival: The USSR and Latin America (Revised ed.). University of Pittsburgh Press. ISBN 978-0-8229-7436-9.
- BNS (2003-12-10). "Lietuvai - archyviniai dokumentai iš konsulato Palestinoj". Delfi.lt.
- Jonušauskas, Laurynas (2003). Likimo vedami: Lietuvos diplomatinės tarnybos egzilyje veikla 1940–1991. Vilnius: Lietuvos gyventojų genocido ir rezistencijos tyrimo centras. ISBN 978-9986-757-56-6.
- Miller, Nicola (1989). Soviet Relations with Latin America, 1959–1987. CUP Archive. ISBN 978-0-521-35193-5.
- Remienė, Marija (3 March 2004). "Lietuvos Respublikos konsulatas Čikagoje 1924–2004 metais". XXI amžiaus horizontai. 5 (74). ISSN 2029-1299.
- Satkauskas, Rytis (June 8, 2017). "Lithuanians in Harbin". Draugas.
