= Bronius Kazys Balutis =

Lithuanian diplomat

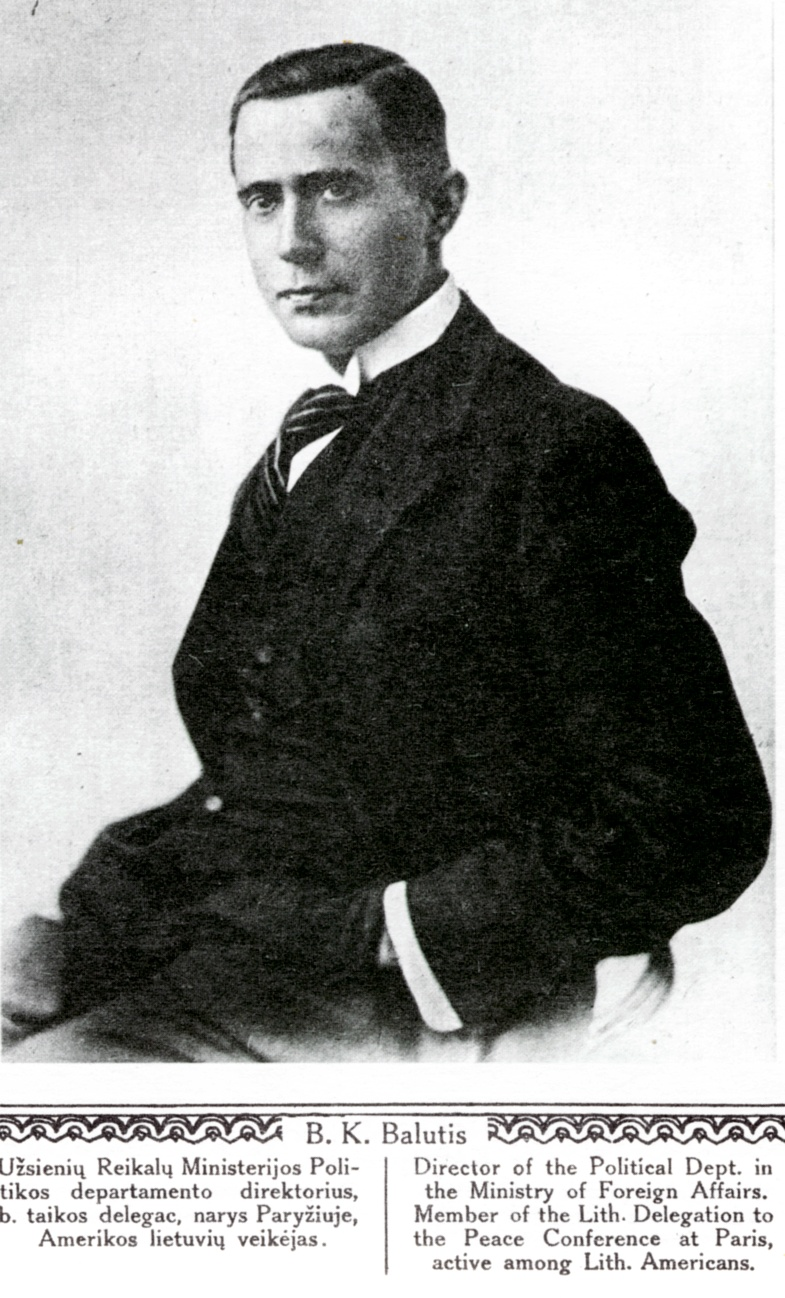
- Balutis in Lithuania Album (1921)
- Born: 5 January 1880; Seirijai, Suwałki Governorate, Russian Empire
- Died: 30 December 1967 (aged 87); London, United Kingdom
- Resting place: St Patrick's Roman Catholic Cemetery in Leytonstone
- Education: Pedagogical seminary in Skępe; Land surveyor school in Pskov; Valparaiso University (attended for six months); Chicago-Kent College of Law
- Occupation: Diplomat
- Spouse: Marija Rehenmaher-Balutienė (m. 1910; died 1960)

Bronius Kazys Balutis (1880–1967) was a Lithuanian diplomat. He worked at the Ministry of Foreign Affairs of Lithuania in 1919–1928 and was involved in many of the major international negotiations of the period. He was the Lithuanian envoy to United States (1928–1934) and to the United Kingdom (1934–1967).

With the help of his uncle, Catholic priest Juozas Židanavičius, Balutis graduated from a teachers' seminary in Skępe (Poland) and a school for land surveyors in Pskov (Russia). He was drafted for the Russo-Japanese War but decided to escape to the United States where his uncle had founded a Lithuanian parish in Amsterdam, New York. In the United States, Balutis worked as a cartographer at Rand McNally for six years and as editor of the Lithuanian weekly Lietuva for seven years. He joined the cultural life of Lithuanian Americans and was a member of the Lithuanian Alliance of America (SLA) and chairman of the Association of Lithuanian Patriots (Lithuanian: Tėvynės mylėtojų draugija).

Balutis started his diplomat career when he was delegated to represent Lithuanian Americans at the Paris Peace Conference in 1919. The delegation was recalled in December 1919 and Balutis was offered a job dealing with "particularly important matters" at the Ministry of Foreign Affairs in Kaunas. Balutis was involved in negotiating essentially every major international agreement in the difficult post-war years. He was involved in negotiating the Latvia–Lithuania border and the Soviet–Lithuanian Peace Treaty of July 1920. During the Polish–Soviet War, Balutis was a member of the Lithuanian delegation that concluded the Suwałki Agreement of October 1920 with Poland. After Poland staged the Żeligowski's Mutiny and captured Vilnius Region, Balutis represented Lithuania at the mediation efforts by the League of Nations. When Lithuania staged the Klaipėda Revolt in January 1923 and captured Klaipėda Region, Balutis and Vaclovas Sidzikauskas negotiated the Klaipėda Convention which was concluded in May 1924.

Though Balutis sympathized with the Lithuanian Nationalist Union, he stayed away from party politics and survived many cabinet changes at the Ministry of Foreign Affairs. He was offered the post of the Minister of Foreign Affairs at least three times, including during the coup d'état of December 1926, but he refused. Pushed by Prime Minister Augustinas Voldemaras, Balutis agreed to join the Lithuanian Diplomatic Service and become the Envoy Extraordinary and Minister Plenipotentiary to the United States in 1928. In 1934, he was reassigned as the envoy to the United Kingdom. When Lithuania was occupied by the Soviet Union in June 1940, the Lithuanian diplomats refused to accept the new Soviet rule and continued to represent independent Lithuania thus preserving the legal continuity of the Lithuanian state. Balutis continued his duties as the Lithuanian envoy until his death in 1967.

== Biography ==
=== Early life and education ===
Balutis was born on 5 January 1880 [O.S. 24 December 1879] though later in life Balutis always indicated that he was born on 29 December 1879. He was the eldest surviving child (an older sister died in infancy). His parents were educated and his first cousin once removed was painter Antanas Žmuidzinavičius. His birth record recorded his surname both in Polish (Balewicz) and in local Dzūkian dialect (Baliucis); he started consistently using Balutis when he moved to the United States.

He attended a primary school in Ūdrija for five years. Balutis' uncle Juozas Židanavičius, a Catholic priest, took Balutis to Skępe (Wymyślin) where he was teaching at a pedagogical seminary. With uncle's help, Balutis graduated from the pedagogical seminary with distinction in 1898. After the graduation, Balutis worked as a teacher in the Płock district and helped his brother to attend the same seminary. In 1901, Balutis applied to a school for land surveyors in Pskov and graduated in 1904. He was drafted to the Russo-Japanese War but decided to escape to the United States where his uncle Židanavičius had founded a Lithuanian parish in Amsterdam, New York.

Balutis arrived to the United States in February 1905 and lived with his uncle. In early 1906, Balutis enrolled into the Valparaiso University which provided introductory English courses, charged low tuition fees, and provided an opportunity to cover some of the tuition by manual labor. Therefore, it was a favorite university among the newly arrived Lithuanian Americans who struggled with English and with finances. Balutis studied English and calculus used in civil engineering. He joined a Lithuanian student society and became its chairman. The university agreed to establish a two-hour daily class on the Lithuanian language and, when the first lecturer left for another job, Balutis became the teacher.

=== Cartographer ===
After six months at Valparaiso, Balutis got a job at Rand McNally as a cartographer and worked there for six years. He later used his mathematical education to decode and develop his own diplomatic ciphers. As a cartographer, Balutis decided to prepare and publish a detailed map of ethnographic Lithuania in Lithuanian. He wanted to mark every inhabited locality and geographic object (lakes, rivers, etc.). In this effort, he was hindered by the lack of a list with Lithuanian typographic names – there were some maps and lists but they were in Russian, German, Polish. Therefore, Balutis spent considerable amount of time – he estimated some 5,000 hours – collecting data on the proper and accurate Lithuanian place names. He interviewed Lithuanian immigrants, corresponded with local parish priests to determine locality's ethnic composition, etc.

Unable to cover entire Lithuania, he published a color map of Suvalkija, his native ethnographic region, in 1915. Its scale was 1:252,000 and it is the only known Lithuanian map to use the Paris meridian. It marked about 3,000 inhabited locations and drew a line between Lithuanian and Polish-inhabited areas. However, due to World War I, the map was not noticed or utilized by the Lithuanian society and maps of other parts of Lithuania were never published.

=== Lithuanian American activist ===
Balutis joined the Lithuanian American cultural life. He attended a Lithuanian conference in Philadelphia on 22 February 1906, which was inspired by the Great Seimas of Vilnius and organized by Jonas Šliūpas and Jonas Žilius. After the conference, Balutis delivered public speeches in Amsterdam and Schenectady about the event and raised money for Lithuanian textbooks to be published by Jonas Basanavičius in Vilnius. He joined the Lithuanian Alliance of America (SLA) and attended its congress in Chicago in May 1906. He delivered a speech on the importance of education which was well received. The following year, he returned to the SLA congress as a deputy secretary and member of the literary commission. He returned to SLA congresses in 1908–1910 and 1914 working to draft SLA's constitution and otherwise improve its organization and procedures.

He also joined the Association of Lithuanian Patriots (Lithuanian: Tėvynės mylėtojų draugija) which was established in 1896 but suffered a decline. Balutis became its chairman in 1907. Together with Juozas Gabrys, he undertook an ambitious project to collect and publish all writings of Vincas Kudirka, editor of Lithuanian newspaper Varpas. The six volumes (a total of 1,770 pages) were published in 1909. Balutis further organized events to commemorate the 50th birth anniversary of Kudirka thus invigorating the society, but resigned as its chairman in 1910. Balutis also joined the Birutė choir established by Mikas Petrauskas.

=== Newspaper editor ===
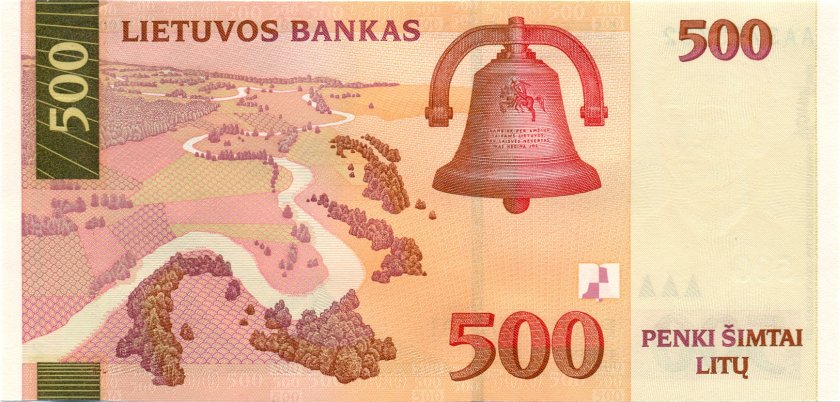
Obverse of the 500 litas banknote (issued in 2000) which features loops of the Neman River and the Lithuanian Liberty Bell inscribed with Balutis' quatrain

In March 1912, he became deputy editor of the Lithuanian weekly Lietuva edited by Juozas Adomaitis-Šernas. Balutis effectively took over the newspaper and edited it until June 1919. He disliked both major branches of the Lithuanian movement – the socialist and Catholic camps – and advocated for the "middle road", i.e. Lithuanian nationalism. As an editor, Balutis stayed away from party politics and instead valued fact checking, polite discussions, and arguments based on facts. A the same time, Balutis studied at the Chicago-Kent College of Law and graduated with a master's degree in 1916. During World War I, Lietuva published a daily two-page supplement with news from the war and Lithuania that was also edited by Balutis.

In 1919, Lithuania Americans inspired by the American Liberty Bell decided to gift a bell to Lithuania. The bell was decorated with the coat of arms of Lithuania and a quatrain by Balutis declaring that those who do not defend liberty are not worth it. The Lithuanian Liberty Bell reached Lithuania in 1922 and is kept at the Vytautas the Great War Museum.

=== International negotiator ===
After the outbreak of World War I, Balutis joined the Lithuanian National League of America (Amerikos lietuvių tautinė sandara), organized by Jonas Šliūpas in October 1916. When the Council of Lithuania declared independence of Lithuania on 16 February 1918, Balutis was a delegate at the large conference organized on 13–14 March 1918 in New York to support the declaration. The conference elected the Lithuanian Executive Committee chaired by Tomas Naruševičius which was supposed to lobby for the Lithuanian political aspirations in Washington, D.C. Balutis attended meetings of the Lithuanian National League of America and the Lithuanian Executive Committee, and, together with Jonas Žilius, was delegated to represent Lithuanian Americans at the Paris Peace Conference. He departed to Europe on 9 July 1919. The Lithuanian delegation in Paris, headed by Augustinas Voldemaras, was not officially recognized or invited to the Peace Conference. Balutis was in charge of monitoring the press and trying to publish pro-Lithuanian articles. He later became delegation's secretary responsible for note taking, archives, and finances. He also worked to obtain economic aid (financial loans, medical supplies, weapons for the newly established Lithuanian Army) until the delegation was recalled in December 1919.

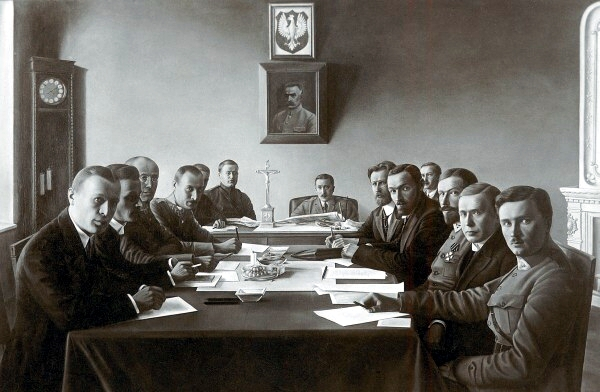
Polish (right) and Lithuanian (left) delegations negotiating the Suwałki Agreement. Balutis is second on the left

Balutis was offered a position at the Ministry of Foreign Affairs in Kaunas. He was assigned "particularly important matters" putting him third in the ministry's hierarchy after minister Augustinas Voldemaras and deputy minister Petras Klimas. In this capacity, Balutis negotiated with Poland regarding an exchange of prisoners of war and with Latvia regarding the Latvia–Lithuania border. In March 1920, he was promoted to director of the Political Department of the ministry. Balutis was in charge of maintaining direct contact with the Lithuanian delegation that negotiated the Soviet–Lithuanian Peace Treaty which was concluded in July 1920. When the Red Army captured Vilnius, the proclaimed capital of Lithuania, Balutis had to negotiate with the Soviets regarding the status of the city and Red Army's breaches of Lithuania's neutrality in the Polish–Soviet War. While Lithuanian and Polish armies clashed in the Suwałki Region, diplomats sparred at the League of Nations. Balutis was a member of the six-men Lithuania delegation that concluded the Suwałki Agreement with Poland on 7 October 1920 under pressure and supervision of the League. During the negotiations, every evening, Balutis had to drive to Kalvarija to confer with the Lithuanian government. The lead Polish negotiator, Mieczysław Mackiewicz, was Balutis' classmate from the primary school in Ūdrija. Poland began the Żeligowski's Mutiny just hours after the Suwałki Agreement was concluded and captured Vilnius starting a long and bitter diplomatic fight over the Vilnius Region. When the League proposed to hold a plebiscite in Vilnius, Balutis headed a Lithuanian delegation to outline the logistics on how and when the plebiscite should be carried out. His primary task was to break the negotiations without putting Lithuania at fault. He used the same tactics when he negotiated with Poland regarding the Hymans' Plans that called for some sort of union between Poland and Lithuania in the spirit of the former Polish–Lithuanian Commonwealth.

After the Klaipėda Revolt in January 1923, Balutis and Petras Klimas helped Prime Minister Ernestas Galvanauskas to coordinate Lithuanian diplomatic communication with the League of Nations. Together with Vaclovas Sidzikauskas, he later negotiated with a three-member commission, chaired by American Norman Davis, of the League of Nations regarding the future of the Klaipėda Region (Memel Territory). The League decided on an unofficial exchange: Lithuania would receive the Klaipėda Region for the lost Vilnius Region. After lengthy and difficult negotiations, the Klaipėda Convention was concluded in May 1924 and Klaipėda became an autonomous region of Lithuania. Balutis also negotiated the Soviet–Lithuanian Non-Aggression Pact of September 1926. In May–June 1927, Balutis negotiated with Tadeusz Hołówko regarding security issues and failed attempt to normalize the relationship with Poland.

=== Ministry of Foreign Affairs ===
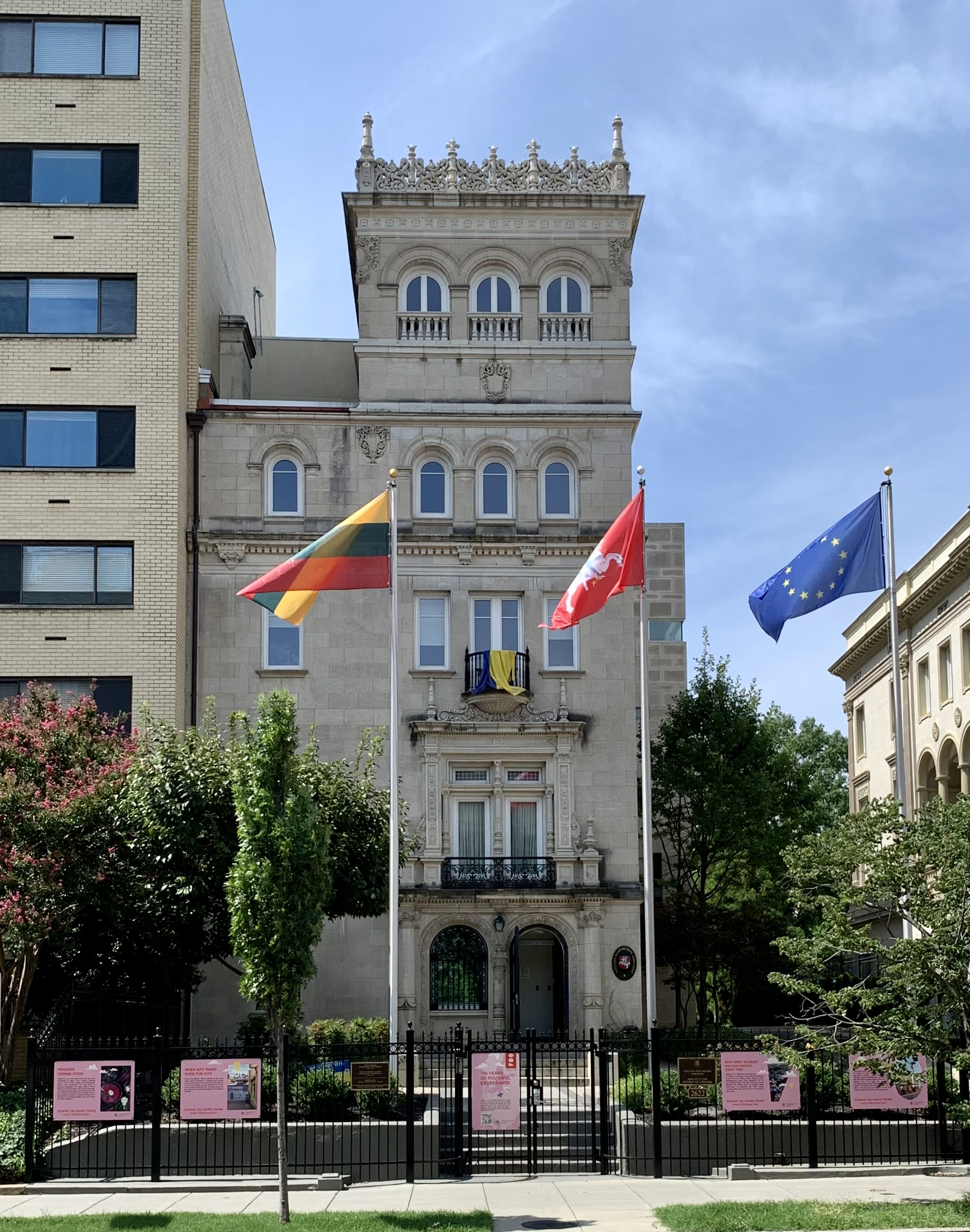
Lithuanian embassy in Washington D.C. where Balutis worked in 1928–1934

Balutis was promoted to the director of the Political Department of the Ministry of Foreign Affairs in March 1920. A year later, the ministry was reorganized into separate departments dealing with Western (headed by Balutis), Eastern, and Central Europe. However, it was not an efficient structure and was abandoned within few months. Balutis resumed directorship of the Political Department. In 1923, due to budget cuts, Political and Economy Departments were merged into one. Balutis continued to head the combined department as during the tenure of Mykolas Sleževičius, who was Prime Minister and Minister of Foreign Affairs at the same time, was effectively in charge of the ministry.

In his memoirs, Balutis claimed that he had heard rumors about the preparations for the coup d'état of December 1926, but did not take them seriously. On the day of the coup he was ordered to take over the Ministry of Foreign Affairs as Sleževičius was arrested. Despite sympathizing with the Lithuanian Nationalist Union, Balutis refused. The major concern was that Poland could use the internal crisis as an excuse to intervene in Lithuanian affairs. One of Balutis' priorities was to communicate the developments to Lithuanian diplomats abroad. In March 1927, the ministry added the position of the general secretary (i.e. vice minister) which was assumed by Balutis. Balutis continued to work at the Ministry of Foreign Affairs until July 1928. He worked under ten different cabinets and eleven Ministers of Foreign Affairs. His status was approaching that of a permanent secretary. He was offered to become the Minister of Foreign Affairs at least on three occasions, but refused.

=== Envoy to the U.S. and UK ===
In his memoir, Balutis claimed that he wanted to remain in Kaunas and continue working at the ministry, but Prime Minister Augustinas Voldemaras and President Antanas Smetona pushed him to choose a post in either London or Washington D.C. Reportedly, the move was also motivated by Balutis' frequent gambling. Balutis served as the Envoy Extraordinary and Minister Plenipotentiary to United States from 1 July 1928 to 31 May 1934. The Lithuania–United States relations were friendly, United States followed the general policy of isolationism and generally stayed out of European politics, and there was very little foreign trade between the two countries. Therefore, the Legation of Lithuania in Washington, D.C. mainly worked on matters of the sizable Lithuanian American community. Balutis was received with suspicion that he arrived as an agent of the new authoritarian regime of President Smetona, which was unpopular with the Lithuanian Americans. Balutis, however, promised to stay away from political intrigues. He served as the envoy during the Great Depression and advised the Lithuanian government to exchange U.S. dollars to gold.

During Christmas 1933, Balutis received an order to return to Kaunas from where he was to head a trade delegation to London and remain there as the new envoy. He officially became the envoy to United Kingdom and Holand on 1 June 1934. The new post presented the opposite challenges from the work in the United States: the Lithuanian community in the United Kingdom was relatively small, but London was at the center of European politics and an increasingly important trade partner with Lithuania. At the time, the Legation of Lithuania in London employed about twenty people.

=== Envoy of occupied Lithuania ===
After Lithuania concluded the Soviet–Lithuanian Mutual Assistance Treaty in October 1939 and agreed to station up to 20,000 Soviet troops in Lithuania on a permanent basis, Lithuanian envoys Stasys Lozoraitis, Petras Klimas, and Balutis prepared a memorandum with contingency plans for the possible Soviet occupation. They advised strengthening the army, depositing funds abroad, reinforcing the 1934 Baltic Entente alliance with Latvia and Estonia, and making preparations to establish a government-in-exile, but nothing tangible was accomplished. When Lithuania was occupied by the Soviet Union in June 1940, the Lithuanian Diplomatic Service refused to accept the new Soviet rule and continued to represent independent Lithuania thus preserving the state continuity. The new People's Government of Lithuania responded by revoking diplomats' – including Balutis' – citizenship, forbidding them to return to Lithuania, and confiscating their property.

Afraid of bomb damage during The Blitz, the legation moved all its furniture to a warehouse in Bermondsey. The warehouse suffered a direct hit and the furniture was lost. No longer receiving funding from Lithuania, Balutis and the legation faced bankruptcy, but Balutis managed to get a loan of £1,500 (equivalent to £72,600 in 2025). After the war, he sold the legation building at 19 Kensington Palace Gardens to the Syrians for £11,000 (equivalent to £410,478 in 2025) and purchased a smaller house at 17 Essex Villas for £5,500 (equivalent to £266,201 in 2025). It was put in Balutis' name so that the Soviet Union could not confiscate it. The Lithuanian legation lived on the proceeds from the sale until 1951 when it started receiving funds from Washington D.C. from the proceeds of selling pre-war Lithuanian gold reserves kept by the Federal Reserve. Due to financial difficulties, the legation's staff was reduced to just Balutis and secretary Vincas Balickas. Balutis' position was further complicated by the Anglo-Soviet Treaty of 1942 and his removal from the list of officially recognized and accredited diplomats in the United Kingdom (together with Latvian and Estonian representatives, his name was moved to an appendix listing people of certain diplomatic status without naming the country they represented). The Baltic diplomats unofficially received advice from the Foreign Office to continue their work as if nothing happened.

The legation helped hundreds of Lithuanian displaced persons straighten out their identity and immigration paperwork. Balutis organized assistance to some 10,000 Lithuanians who immigrated to the United Kingdom after the war. Balutis frequently corresponded with Mykolas Krupavičius, chairman of the Supreme Committee for the Liberation of Lithuania (VLIK), and acted as a mediator between VLIK and the Diplomatic Service and in their disagreement on who was the ultimate representative of the Lithuanian hopes to restore independence. Balutis also established and maintained contacts with MI6, the British foreign intelligence service (his main contact was Alexander McKibben codename Sandy). Balutis worked on freeing up pre-war Lithuanian gold reserves (some 2.9 tonnes) held by the Bank of England. Initially, England froze the reserves and refused to transfer it to either Lithuanian diplomats or the Soviet Union; however, in 1967, the First Wilson ministry used the reserve in settling mutual claims with the Soviet Union.

Despite the difficulties, Balutis continued his duties as the Lithuanian envoy until his death in 1967. After Balutis' death, the legation was taken over by Balickas who continued to represent Lithuanian until 1993.

== Personal life ==
In 1910, Balutis married Marija Rehenmaher of mixed Russian and German parentage whom he met in Pskov. They had one daughter, Ada, but their marriage was troubled. British diplomat Thomas Hildebrand Preston compared Marija to Madame de Staël and claimed that she was a close friend with Sofija Smetonienė, the First Lady of Lithuania. In summer 1940, Marija and Ada traveled to Lithuania for a vacation, but were caught by the Soviet occupation of Lithuania. Separately, they managed to escape from occupied Lithuania and reunite in Stockholm. After the war, they moved to Toronto, Canada and later Los Angeles, United States. Marija died on 3 January 1960 and was buried in the Forest Lawn Cemetery.

== Bibliography ==
- 15min (7 June 2019). "Išskirtinis jubiliejus: prieš 100 metų Čikagoje pirmąkart suskambo Lietuvos Laisvės varpas" (in Lithuanian).
- Anušauskas, Arvydas; et al., eds. (2005). Lietuva, 1940–1990 (in Lithuanian). Vilnius: Lietuvos gyventojų genocido ir rezistencijos tyrimo centras. ISBN 9986-757-65-7.
- Ashbourne, Alexandra (1999). Lithuania: The Rebirth of a Nation, 1991–1994. Lexington Books. ISBN 0-7391-0027-0.
- Banionis, Juozas (2010). Lietuvos laisvinimas Vakaruose 1940–1975 m. (in Lithuanian). Lietuvos gyventojų genocido ir rezistencijos tyrimo centras. ISBN 978-609-8037-03-6.
- Čepėnas, Pranas (1986). Naujųjų laikų Lietuvos istorija (in Lithuanian). Vol. II. Chicago: Dr. Griniaus fondas. ISBN 5-89957-012-1.
- "Mirė Marija Balutienė" (PDF). Dirva (in Lithuanian). 3. 8 January 1960.
- Gaigalaitė, Aldona (4 January 2003). "Lietuvos užsienio politika ir diplomatas B. K. Balutis" (PDF). Draugas. Literatūra, menas, mokslas (in Lithuanian). 2 (1).
- Gaigalaitė, Aldona; Skirius, Juozas; Kasparavičius, Algimantas; Veilentienė, Audronė (1999). Lietuvos užsienio reikalų ministrai: 1918–1940 (PDF) (in Lithuanian). Kaunas: Šviesa. ISBN 5-430-02696-4.
- Girkus, Romualdas; Lukoševičius, Viktoras (2009). "Pirmasis lietuviškas Suvalkijos žemėlapis". Geodezija Ir Kartografija (in Lithuanian). 3 (35): 104–109. Bibcode:2009GeCar..35..104G. doi:10.3846/1392-1541.2009.35.104-109. ISSN 1392-1541. S2CID 131636902.
- IIT Chicago-Kent College of Law. "Class of 1916".
- Jakštas, Juozas (1979). Dr. Jonas Šliūpas (in Lithuanian). Chicago: Akademinės skautijos leidykla. OCLC 5223546.
- Jonušauskas, Laurynas (2003). Likimo vedami: Lietuvos diplomatinės tarnybos egzilyje veikla 1940–1991. Vilnius: Lietuvos gyventojų genocido ir rezistencijos tyrimo centras. ISBN 9986-757-56-8.
- Lietuvos Respublikos ambasada Jungtinėje Karalystėje (2018-11-01). "Ambasados kolektyvas aplankė Londone palaidotų Lietuvos diplomatų kapus" (in Lithuanian).
- Lukšas, Arnas (29 December 2017). "Bronius Kazys Balutis: atlikęs patrioto pareigą" (in Lithuanian). Lietuvos žinios.
- Petraitytė-Briedienė, Asta (2014). Tylieji priesaikos riteriai. Lietuvos pasiuntinybė Vašingtone šaltojo karo metais (PDF) (in Lithuanian). Vytauto Didžiojo universitetas. ISBN 978-609-467-076-3.
- Senn, Alfred Erich (1966). The Great Powers, Lithuania and the Vilna Question 1920–1928. Studies in East European history. Vol. 11. E.J. Brill. OCLC 398265.
- Širvydas, Vytautas (1951). Bronius Kazys Balutis: jo gyvenimas ir darbai (in Lithuanian). Sodus, Michigan: J. J. Bachunas. OCLC 1090100911.
- Skirius, Juozas (2000). "Tautos vienybės idėjos propagavimas B.K. Balučio redaguojamoje "Lietuvoje" 1912-1916 m." (PDF). Istorija (in Lithuanian). 45. ISSN 1392-0456.
- Snyder, Timothy (2004). The Reconstruction of Nations: Poland, Ukraine, Lithuania, Belarus, 1569–1999. Yale University Press. ISBN 0-300-10586-X.
- Žalys, Vytautas (2007). Lietuvos diplomatijos istorija (1925–1940) (in Lithuanian). Vol. I. Vilnius: Versus aureus. ISBN 978-9955-699-50-7.
- Žalys, Vytautas (2012). Lietuvos diplomatijos istorija (1925–1940) (PDF) (in Lithuanian). Vol. II, part I. Vilnius: Edukologija. ISBN 978-9955-20-801-3.
- Ziemele, Ineta (2005). State Continuity and Nationality: The Baltic States and Russia. Martinus Nijhoff Publishers. ISBN 90-04-14295-9.
