= Anthony A. Olis =

- Born: August 25, 1898; Chicago, United States
- Died: June 3, 1958 (aged 59); Chicago, United States
- Other names: Anton A. Olis; Antanas Olis
- Education: University of Chicago Law School
- Occupations: Attorney, activist
- Father: Antanas Olšauskas

Anthony A. Olis (August 25, 1898 – June 3, 1958) was a Lithuanian American attorney and activist. He was the president of the Metropolitan Sanitary District of Greater Chicago from 1950 to his death.

Born into a family of the Lithuanian entrepreneur Antanas Olšauskas, Olis studied law at the University of Chicago Law School and worked as an attorney. As a member of the Republican Party, he was elected to the board of the Metropolitan Sanitary District of Greater Chicago in 1946. In 1956, Chicago American praised Olis' leadership as the sanitary district reduced costs and local taxes while expanding service area and serving more people. Olis campaigned for increased water diversion from Lake Michigan into the Illinois Waterway, though such legislation was twice vetoed by President Dwight D. Eisenhower.

Olis was active in the Lithuania American cultural and political life. He was a member of the Lithuanian Birutė Choir and organized various Lithuanian events, particularly concerts of classical music. In 1934, Olis was a conductor of the Chicago Symphony Orchestra which performed Lithuanian music at the Century of Progress (Chicago World's Fair). Politically, Olis was a member of the nationalist (tautininkai) camp. After the Soviet occupation of Lithuania in June 1940, he used his connections in the Republican Party to publicize the issue of the Soviet occupation of the Baltic states and advocate for continued non-recognition of the occupation. Olis was the chairman or vice-chairman of several Lithuanian American political organizations, including the American Lithuanian Council.

== Biography ==
=== Early life and education ===
Olis was born on August 25, 1898, in Chicago. His father was Antanas Olšauskas (also known by his Polonized last name Olszewski), a Lithuanian immigrant who founded a bank and published the Lithuanian weekly Lietuva. Olis is the shortened and Americanized surname that replaced his birth name Olszewski. His mother died when he was six years old. After graduating from the Calumet High School in 1915, he served in the United States Navy during World War I.

He then enrolled at the University of Chicago where he received a bachelor in philosophy (Ph.B.) in 1919. He then studied at the University of Chicago Law School receiving a doctor of law (JD) in 1921. He was admitted to the Illinois State Bar Association the same year. He worked at the law firms of Goss and Rooney and William Beebe. He later became a partner in Olis, Vasalle & Lapinskas.

=== Government service ===
Olis joined the Republican Party and was active in the 7th ward. In 1941–1946, he was a Hearing Referee with the Illinois Department of Revenue. He unsuccessfully ran in the elections for judge in the Municipal Court of Chicago in 1942 and in 1944.

In November 1946, he was elected to the board of the Metropolitan Sanitary District of Greater Chicago and became its president on December 5, 1950. He was reelected as president in 1952 and 1956 and served until his death. His work at the sanitary district was well received. In 1952, he received endorsements from all four major Chicago newspapers – Chicago Sun-Times, Chicago American, Chicago Daily News, Chicago Tribune. In 1956, Chicago American praised Olis for reducing costs and local taxes while expanding service area and serving more people. During his tenure, the sanitary district was expanded twice: by 121 square miles (310 km^{2}) in 1955 and by 412 mi^{2} (1,070 km^{2}) in 1956 for a total of 920 mi^{2} (2,400 km^{2}) encompassing 106 municipalities. Olis campaigned for increased water diversion from Lake Michigan into the Illinois Waterway, though such legislation was twice vetoed by President Dwight D. Eisenhower. In 1956, the sanitary district moved to the newly built headquarters that was initiated by Olis.

Despite a severe illness, Olis continued to work at the sanitary district until he entered the Albert Merritt Billings Hospital where he died a week later on June 3, 1958.

=== Lithuanian activist ===
==== Cultural activities ====
Olis was particularly active among Lithuanian Americans. He spoke fluent Lithuanian even though he never visited the country. From an early age, he showed affinity for music. In 1920, he joined the Lithuanian Birutė Choir (originally established by Mikas Petrauskas). When its choirmaster Stasys Šimkus returned to Lithuania, Olis was selected as his successor. In 1923, Birutė Choir and Olis performed operetta Bailus daktaras (a Lithuanian translation and adaption of The Doctor of Alcantara by Julius Eichberg). The evening generated a profit of US$2,000 (equivalent to $37,793 in 2025).

Together with his brother-in-law Antanas Vanagaitis, Olis organized and often performed at various Lithuanian events. He particularly liked concerts of classical music. Even though such events were usually not profitable, Vanagaitis and Olis pursued an ambitious cultural program and rented large music venues in Chicago (e.g. Stevens Hotel or Morrison Hotel). On 19 August 1934, Olis was the conductor of the Chicago Symphony Orchestra which performed Lithuanian music at the Century of Progress (Chicago World's Fair). In 1954, to celebrate the 30th anniversary of Vanagaitis' public work, they organized a particularly large concert at the Civic Opera Building. It included performances by the opera singer Polyna Stoska and the Chicago Symphony Orchestra directed by Vytautas Marijošius.

Olis composed a few music scores (they remained unpublished). He also wrote the script and directed two Lithuanian movies (one of them for the 30th anniversary of Vanagaitis).

In 1935, Olis worked to erect a monument to the Lithuanian-American aviators Steponas Darius and Stasys Girėnas in Marquette Park. In 1949–1950, Olis organized exhibitions of works by Lithuanian artists in New York, Waterbury, Boston, Detroit, and Chicago.

==== Political activities ====
Politically, Olis was a member of the nationalist (tautininkai) camp – the middle road between conservative Catholics and liberal socialists. However, this camp was divided and did not have a unifying organization. The nationalists gathered around the Lithuanian periodicals Margutis (published by Antanas Vanagaitis), Dirva, Sandara. Olis became more politically active after the Soviet occupation of Lithuania in June 1940. He saw former President Antanas Smetona who emigrated to the United States as a key to promoting the cause of Lithuania's independence. Olis organized various events, including lectures by Smetona, promoting the cause.

After World War II, Olis used his political connections within the Republican Party to publicize the issue of the Soviet occupation of the Baltic states and advocate for continued non-recognition of the occupation. Olis organized two large gatherings in Washington DC on March 21–24, 1945 and November 16–17, 1945, that were attended by hundreds of politicians. Olis' speech at the gathering was added to the Congressional Record on 29 March 1945 by Senator Charles W. Tobey. In this speech, Olis demanded a free referendum in Lithuania to determine its relationship with the Soviet Union. That same year, Olis and other Lithuanian representatives traveled to the United Nations Conference on International Organization in San Francisco and presented a memorandum calling to admit Lithuania to the United Nations. In 1952, Olis worked to add the issue of Lithuania and other captive nations to the Republican electoral program.

To facilitate his political activities, Olis was a leader of several Lithuanian political organizations. He was the chairman of the Association to Liberate Lithuania (Lietuvai vaduoti sąjunga) founded in 1941 (it later morphed into the American Lithuanian Mission). In 1949, three nationalists organizations (including the American Lithuanian Mission) united into the Lithuanian-American National Union (Amerikos lietuvių tautinė sąjunga) which was chaired by Olis until 1951. In 1948, the nationalists joined the American Lithuanian Council and Olis became its vice-chairman.

The nationalists organized the Lithuanian National Relief Fund, which thanks to Olis' political connections, was the only Lithuanian fund registered with the National War Fund. After intense negotiations, nationalists agreed to join the United Lithuanian Relief Fund of America (established in 1944) with other Lithuanian American organizations. Olis became the vice-chairman of this united fund.

==== Memberships ====
Olis was a member of the American Legion and various gentlemen's clubs in Chicago, including the South Shore Country Club, Union League Club of Chicago, City Club of Chicago.

Olis was also a member of various Lithuanian American organizations. He was a founder of a local youth chapter of the Lithuanian Alliance of America (LAA). He was elected chairman of LAA's finance committee and assisted with LAA's organizational matters. He was offered chairmanship of LAA several times, but refused.

== Bibliography ==
- Dapkutė, Daiva (2018). "Antanas Olis: "Aš neturėjau laimės pamatyti Lietuvos"". Istorija. 1 (109): 77–99. ISSN 1392-0456.
