= Antanas Olšauskas =

Lithuanian American publisher and banker (1863–1942)

- Born: June 13, 1863; Aštruliai, Suwałki Governorate, Russian Empire
- Died: May 10, 1942 (aged 78); Chicago, United States
- Other names: Anton Olszewski
- Occupations: Newspaper publisher, banker
- Children: Anthony A. Olis

Antanas Olšauskas (June 13, 1863 – May 10, 1942) was a Lithuanian American businessman. He was the publisher of the Lithuanian weekly newspaper Lietuva and founder of A. Olszewski Bank.

Orphaned at an early age, Olšauskas did not receive any formal education. He worked as a carpenter before emigrating to the United States at the age of 25. He managed to get a job at a Polish printing press. In 1893, he took over the struggling Lithuanian weekly newspaper Lietuva and turned it around. It became a popular liberal periodical. He then established A. Olszewski Bank which served the Lithuanian American community. It became successful and customer deposits peaked at $1 million. Olšauskas used customer deposits to build offices and open other business ventures (Theater Milda, clothing shop, car dealership, residential real estate). A bank run in 1916 forced him to sell these businesses and liquidate the bank. However, he was able to raise capital and establish the Universal State Bank in 1917. After quarrels with the new leadership of the Universal State Bank, Olšauskas resigned in 1919. He then made a modest living selling ship tickets and insurance.

== Biography ==
=== Early life ===
Olšauskas was born on June 13, 1863, in Aštruliai, a small village near Liudvinavas, to a family of petty Lithuanian nobles. He was orphaned at the age of four and his family's farm was sold to pay debts. He was raised by his maternal grandparents who taught him to read. Olšauskas never received any formal education. Due to poor health, he could not perform hard physical labor and searched for better means of living. He learned carpentry and worked to construct furniture, repair church altars, etc. For two years, he worked to restore the Catholic church in Krasnopol. In 1889, having saved 300 rubles, Olšauskas decided to emigrate to the United States.

=== Publisher of Lietuva ===
He arrived to Plymouth, Massachusetts, in April 1889. He tried to pursue carpentry, but could not get a better job due to poor English language skills. Olšauskas was inspired by the example of two Lithuanian businessmen who published the Lithuanian newspaper Vienybė lietuvininkų and pursued jobs at emigrant publishing houses. Eventually, he was hired by the Polish Gazeta Polska published in Chicago. He also worked for Dziennik Chicagoski and Reforma. In 1892, Olšauskas worked as a typesetter for Polish newspaper Nowe Życie but it went bankrupt. He convinced the new owner, Stasys Rakošius, to publish the first Lithuanian newspaper in Chicago Lietuva. The first issue was published on December 6, 1892, but Rakošius sold the printing press to Vincas Žaliauskas who fired Olšauskas.

The printing press of Lietuva continued to struggle. Olšauskas and three other men agreed to take it over for $300 (equivalent to $10,750 in 2025). Olšauskas was primarily in charge of content starting with the 24th issue. The newspaper became a liberal publication which advocated for unity among Lithuanian immigrants, campaigned for a Lithuanian representative in the U.S. Congress, promoted entrepreneurship and self-improvement, discussed relations between Poles and Lithuanians, and debated political issues concerning Lithuania. The newspaper gained popularity and the printing press relocated to more spacious premises in 1894. Experienced journalist Juozas Adomaitis-Šernas became chief editor of Lietuva in December 1895.

In addition to publishing Lietuva, the printing house also published Lithuanian books. In 1894–1917, it published a total of 131 books, of which 45 were original and others were translations. These included 28 books on fairytales, legends, novellas, 31 theater plays, 20 popular science works, 15 texts on history, ethnography, culture, and three dictionaries.

=== Banker ===
Olšauskas became known as a reliable man. Thus, Lithuanians began bringing him sums of money for safekeeping. This inspired Olšauskas to establish a bank which primarily served as a bank of the Lithuanian American community. He built two-floor house on the 33rd Street for $5,000 (equivalent to $193,500 in 2025) in 1896. He lived on the second floor, while the first floor had the printing press, bookstore, and A. Olszewski Bank. The business was going well and Olšauskas was able to buy out other owners of Lietuva remaining the sole shareholder of the printing press in 1901. In 1905, socialists inspired printing press workers to go on strike. When Lietuva missed an issue, rumors spread that Olšauskas was going bankrupt, but his bank withstood a bank run and continued to grow. Customer deposits at A. Olszewski Bank peaked at $1 million. Lithuanians sent some $4 million to relatives at home via the bank in 1895–1914.

In 1906, Olšauskas decided to build a three-floor house on the corner of 33rd and Halsted Street at a cost of $100,000 (equivalent to $3,583,333 in 2025). It housed not only the printing press and bank, but also a clothing store, medical offices, and rented apartments. He used customer deposits for other business ventures – opening a clothing and a furniture store, establishing a car dealership, building residential houses, etc. He built the 1200-seat Milda Theater at a cost of $250,000. He also planned on publishing the first Lithuanian-language encyclopedia.

In 1916, Olšauskas started raising the required $200,000 capital for the establishment of a state bank. However, another Lithuanian community bank (Tananevicz Savings Bank) failed which caused a bank run on Olšauskas' bank. It is estimated that at the time, the bank had about $600,000 in customer deposits and only $100,000 in cash. Olšauskas was forced to sell the various businesses (including Lietuva) and personal assets at prices that were deflated due to the ongoing war. Nevertheless, he managed to return the deposits to customers and establish the Universal State Bank in 1917. However, because he lacked any financial education, Olšauskas was allowed only a role as vice-president. He quarreled with chairman Juozapas J. Elias and resigned from the bank in 1919.

Olšauskas then opened a small office that sold ship tickets to new Lithuanian emigrants, sold insurance, provided notary services, etc. He did not regain his business fortune and died on May 10, 1942, in Chicago.

== Bibliography ==
- Kasparavičius, Gediminas (2019). "XIX a. pab. – XX a. pr. lietuviai verslininkai JAV" [Lithuanian businessmen in the United States at the turn of the 20th century]. Oikos: Lietuvių migracijos ir diasporos studijos (in Lithuanian). 28 (2): 21–47. doi:10.7220/2351-6561.28.2. hdl:20.500.12259/102936. ISSN 1822-5152.
