= Mamertas Indriliūnas =

Lithuanian writer (1920–1945)

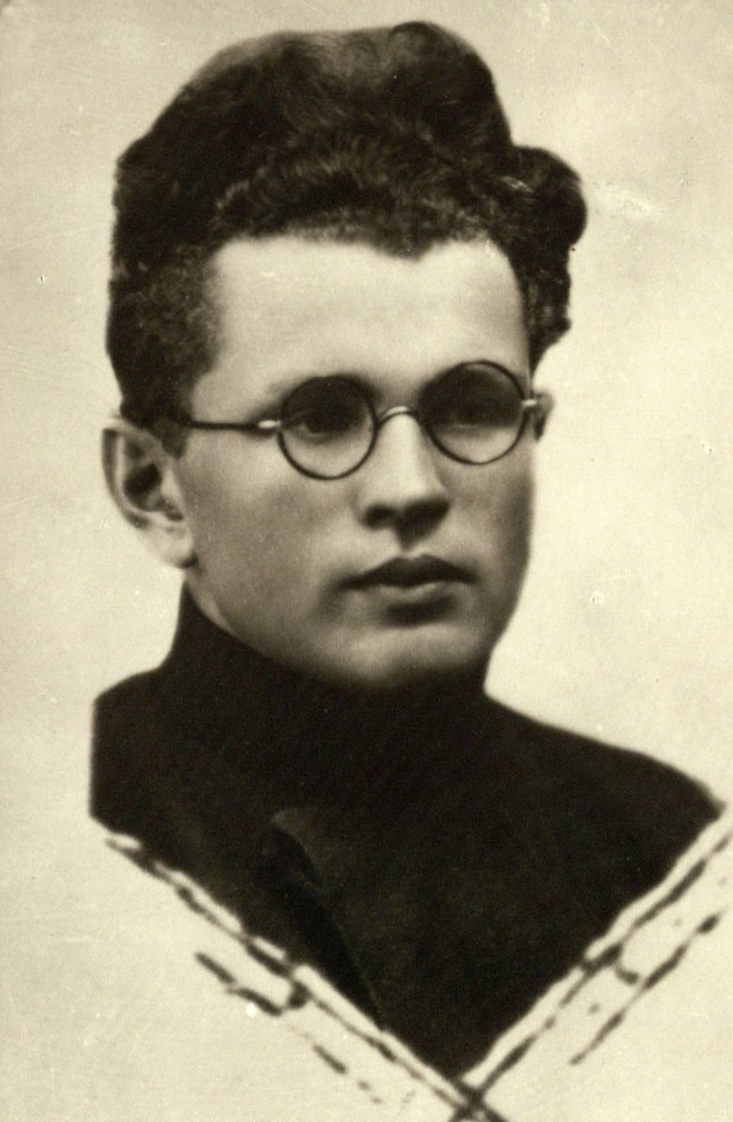
- Born: 28 January 1920; Gataučiai, Lithuania
- Died: 21 February 1945 (aged 25); Leliškiai forest, Lithuanian SSR, USSR (now Lithuania)
- Education: Vytautas Magnus University; Vilnius University
- Occupations: Writer, partisan, literary critic, translator
- Writing career
- Years active: 1938–1945
- Subjects: Creativity, heroism

Mamertas Indriliūnas (28 January 1920 – 21 February 1945) was a Lithuanian writer, literary critic, translator, and anti-Soviet partisan. He attended the Biržai gymnasium and established himself as a worthy literary critic. In Vytautas Magnus University he studied Lithuanian language and literature and joined Vincas Mykolaitis-Putinas's Šatrija art circle, as well as the theatre seminar headed by Balys Sruoga, developing a strong friendship with Bronius Krivickas. After completing his education in Vilnius University, Indriliūnas joined the Lithuanian partisans after the Soviet re-occupation of Lithuania in 1944.

== Biography ==
=== Early life ===
Mamertas Indriliūnas was born on 28 January 1920 in the village of Gataučiai of the Biržai district to farmers Gasparas Indriliūnas and Uršulė Paliulytė in a family of six children. Gasparas Indriliūnas worked in the United States for four years loading wagons for money. In 1914 he was mobilized for World War I, but surrendered to the Germans in Macedonia on the first day of fighting. In 1918 he returned to Lithuania. A local pastor encouraged Mamertas Indriliūnas' parents to let him attend school. Indriliūnas finished the Nausėdžiai primary school, after which he self-educated at home and then joined the Biržai gymnasium. Here he established himself as a competent literary critic and reviewer, although Indriliūnas was most interested in poetry. He completed education in the gymnasium in 1938.

=== Studies in university ===
He entered the Theology-philosophy faculty of Vytautas Magnus University in 1938 and chose Lithuanian language and literature as his main branches of study, with pedagogy and psychology being side-studies. He joined the Šatrija art circle, a group of writers with Christian-leaning views, overseen by the writer Vincas Mykolaitis-Putinas, and also joined the theatre seminar headed by the writer Balys Sruoga. During his time at university, Indriliūnas met many writers, one of which was Bronius Krivickas, with whom he developed a friendship. From 1941 to 1943 Indriliūnas continued his studies at Vilnius University at the faculty of humanitarian sciences and later completed his exams. In newspapers like Ateitis and Naujoji Romuva Indriliūnas wrote about the works of poet Jonas Aistis and also the modernist tendencies of Bronius Krivickas. In his 1944 diploma work entitled V. Mykolaičio-Putino lyrikos kelias (The Lyric Path of V. Mykolaitis-Putinas), Indriliūnas characterized a poet's struggle for personality and creative freedom as a rebellion of the soul against an oppressive being. His plans to get a higher education diploma were interrupted by World War II. Indriliūnas would hear of persecutions in Vilnius and would quickly inform his family.

=== Resistance and death ===
In 1944, during the Soviet re-occupation of Lithuania, fearing mobilization and persecution, right before Christmas, Indriliūnas joined the partisan resistance movement as a member of the Šatas partisan squad. In the two last months of his life, Indriliūnas was reading Dante's Divine Comedy in Italian. Indriliūnas and his brother Jonas died on 21 February 1945 in the forest of Leliškiai after a battle with the NKVD. He and his colleagues were buried on the shore of the Tatula river, at which a monument dedicated to the partisans stands.

== Literary work ==
Indriliūnas was an active literature critic, writer, and translator. Most of his works were written between 1938 and 1939. Indriliūnas wrote works both on literature, such as Literatūrinis gyvenimas Vilniaus universitete (Literature Life in Vilnius University), and on art, such as Žmogaus išsilaisvinimas mene (A Humans Emancipation in Art) and M. K. Čiurlionis. Indriliūnas reportedly knew six languages. Indriliūnas also translated the works of Francis Jammes, W. B. Yeats, Rainer Maria Rilke and Oscar Milosz.
