= Bronius Krivickas =

Lithuanian writer and partisan

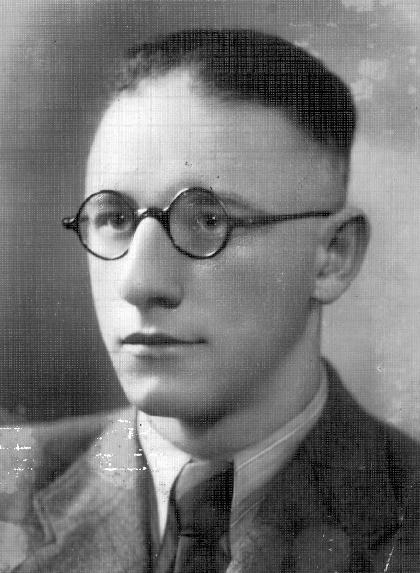
- Krivickas in 1939
- Born: 17 November 1919; Pervalkai, Lithuania
- Died: 21 September 1952 (aged 32); Raguva forest, Lithuanian SSR
- Resting place: Putiliškiai village cemetery
- Education: Vytautas Magnus University; Vilnius University
- Occupations: Writer, poet, partisan, literary critic, translator
- Spouse: Marytė Ziemelytė
- Relatives: Father: Antanas Krivickas Ona Krivickienė (Čingaitė)
- Writing career
- Years active: 1938–1952
- Genres: Satire, realism, grotesque, absurdism
- Subjects: Religion, partisan lifestyle, heroism
- Literary movement: Lithuanian partisans

Bronius Krivickas (17 November 1919 – 21 September 1952) was a Lithuanian writer, poet, literary critic, and anti-Soviet partisan. His work is mainly characterized by satire and literary criticism against the occupying Soviet state. Among the partisans he was also widely known by his codename Vilnius.

Having enjoyed writing at an early age, Krivickas studied Lithuanian and French languages and literature at the Vytautas Magnus University. He participated in the activities of Vincas Mykolaitis-Putinas's Šatrija art circle and Balys Sruoga's theater seminar. Krivickas established himself as a literary and theater critic, as well as poet and novella writer, and also developed a friendship with Mamertas Indriliūnas. He joined the Lithuanian partisan movement in 1945 and participated in their activities as a communicator, being dubbed by fellow partisans as "the professor" until his death in 1952 when he was found hiding in a bunker and subsequently executed. Krivickas and his works were one of the main voices of anti-Soviet resistance.

== Biography ==
=== Early life ===
Bronius Krivickas was born on 17 November 1919 in the Pervalkai village of the Pasvalys district. Born in a family of peasants, Krivickas had six siblings, three sisters and three brothers. In 1929, the family moved to the Kiauliškės village in the Biržai district as Krivickas' parents sold their farm for a bigger one.

Krivickas went to the Suostas primary school, and in 1938 he finished the Antanas Smetona gymnasium in Biržai, in which he read his works in social literary evenings and once even won the prize of 30 litai in an essay contest. The same year Krivickas started to study at the Vytautas Magnus University at the faculty of theology and philosophy, specifically Lithuanian and French language and literature.

In the university he joined the Šatrija art circle, a group of writers with Christian-leaning views, overseen by the writer Vincas Mykolaitis-Putinas in whose conventions Krivickas met many Lithuanian writers. Krivickas also was a part of the theatre seminar headed by the writer Balys Sruoga. From 1938 he wrote short novellas which appeared in the newspapers Ateitis and Studentų dienos (which he also edited). Krivickas was also friends with Mamertas Indriliūnas, a fellow writer and partisan.

=== Activity in Vilnius ===
When Lithuania received the capital Vilnius after the Soviet–Lithuanian Mutual Assistance Treaty in 1939, Krivickas and his colleagues moved there to study at Vilnius University, participating in various social activities and establishing himself as a theatre critic. In 1943, he completed his studies, however the university was shut down in the same year due to the Nazi occupation. To continue earning money and out of fear of being sent to Germany for work, from 1944 he assisted in editing the newspapers Naujoji Romuva, Darbininkas, Kūryba, XX amžius. On 1 October 1944, he briefly became a teacher at the Biržai gymnasium as Lithuania had a shortage of teachers. However, he started getting called to the NKVD headquarters, and fearing arrest, he subsequently went into hiding.

=== Activity as a partisan ===
In February 1945, he joined the partisan movement in the same outskirts in which two of his brothers also were active. In the same year, his brother Juozas was killed and their parents were driven out from their homes with the homestead burned. From 1947 to 1948, Krivickas would stay in bunkers, such as his wife's parents' homestead bunker in Tylinava in the winters, and would hide in the forests in the summers. In 1948, a priest in Suostas quietly wed Krivickas and a school teacher from Smilgiai. Krivickas belonged to the partisan Eastern Lithuanian (King Mindaugas) Area, for which he edited partisan newspapers. The partisans reportedly respected Krivickas. Working as a communicator between them, intensely studying languages, keeping a large amount of books in his bunkers, and also briefly being the second-in-command of another partisan squad led by Petras Tupėnas, Krivickas was known as "the professor". Krivickas used to seclude himself, write poems, and then recite them by the fire in the evening for fellow partisans.

=== Final years and death ===
Under fear of his wife being persecuted, Krivickas moved to the partisans in Biržai. This period was the most creatively productive for him, as he notably translated 80 of Goethe's poems and wrote numerous sonnets. As the number of partisans increasingly lowered, from 1951 Bronius found himself in the eastern Lithuanian partisan headquarters editing the newspapers Aukštaičių kova and Laisvės kova.

On 21 September 1952, not being able to resist interrogation, the area commander Jonas Kimštas was forced to reveal the location of the eastern headquarters. About a thousand soldiers surrounded the forest of Raguva, and after finding one of the three bunkers in which Krivickas hid, they executed him immediately.

On April 6, 1953, Bronius' brother, Jonas Krivickas (also known as Jonas or Kirvis), was killed in the Skaistakalnis forest (Surgieniai), in the Bauska district of Latvia.

== Literary style ==
At the time of studying, he established himself as a critic, novelist, and dramaturg. Krivickas upheld the strict aesthetic qualities of his critical literature throughout his literary career. Krivickas's short stories are characterized by psychologically resilient characters and philosophical undertones. His poetry mainly focused on a person's relationship with existence, the world, and death.

Krivickas's first poem from the partisan period is dated 1945. At first, his works, which were poems, sonnets, and satires, were only spread by word of mouth or transcripts among the partisans or their supporters. His work was characterized by the promotion of classical values, as well as heroism and the fearlessness of death, which were values he himself upheld. Because of his time as a partisan, many of his works include describing the life of living with partisans – hiding in bunkers and forests, the death of close friends and family, and most importantly – leaving the last bullet to yourself. Some of his works are characterized by religion as in multiple poems he mentions the wrath of god, describing also that through pain and death one can achieve peace and come to god. His satires included elements of grotesque and absurdism, and in them he chooses to mock the Soviet government and reveal the truth of its occupation, propaganda, and cruelty, also ironizing the supposed "allies" of the Soviet Union.

Krivickas compared the partisan struggle for freedom with the Israelite fight for the promised land and various other heroic medieval tales. In such context, however, Krivickas realizes that there is very little hope, and embraces a stoic mindset in his poems, which are now one of his most famous works, Pralaimėjimas, Migla, Partizano mirtis, and Deividas prieš Goliatą (David versus Goliath).

== Legacy ==
Krivickas is mainly remembered as a poet-partisan.

His surviving works and pictures are displayed at the Maironis Museum of Lithuanian Literature.

- In 1996, a sculpture of Krivickas was uncovered in the Putiliškiai cemetery.
- In 1998, he was recognized as a war volunteer, was given the rank of captain, and was awarded the Commander's Grand Cross of the Order of the Cross of Vytis.
- In 1999, a collection of Krivickas's works titled Broniaus Krivicko raštai was published by Virginijus Gasiliūnas.
- In 2008, a remembrance sign was built at the death site.
