= Roslyn Historical Cemeteries =

Cemeteries in Kittitas County, Washington

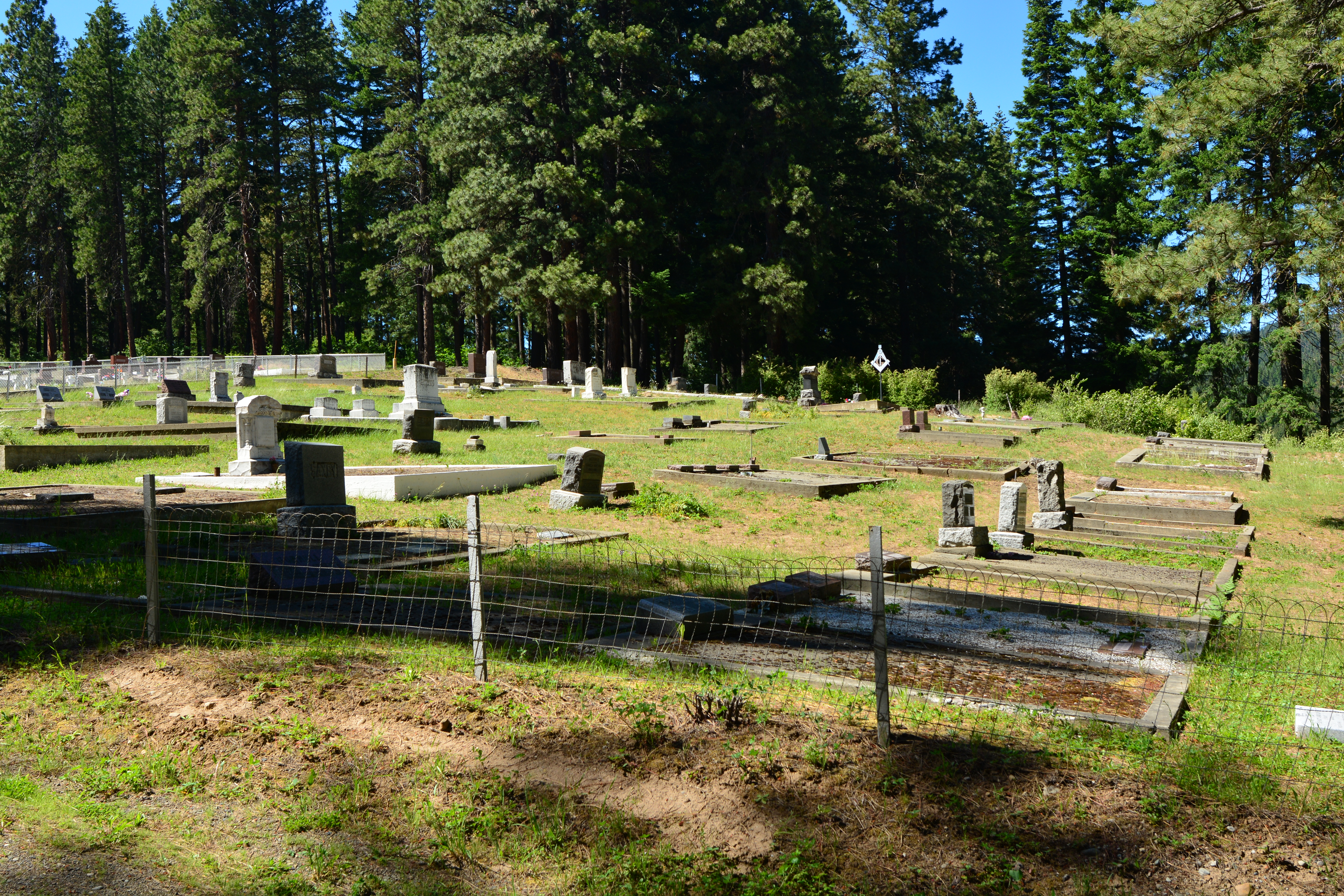

Details
- Established: 1887
- Location: Roslyn, Washington
- Country: United States
- Type: Historic
- No. of graves: 5,000+ Known
- Website: Official

The Roslyn Historical Cemeteries is a collection of 26 separate cemeteries in Roslyn, Washington, US. Situated on 15 acres, the cemeteries include an estimated 5,000 graves and represent at least 24 different nationalities.

== History ==
Shortly after coal was discovered in the nearby area, Roslyn, Washington was founded in 1886 by Logan M. Bullet, the Vice President of the Northern Pacific Coal Company. Many immigrants moved to the town seeking employment in the mines, and by 1890, the town had grown to a population of 1,481 residents. As the town's population grew, many local clubs were founded, in which upon membership was dependent on monthly fees and the applicant's ethnic background, religious beliefs, or cultural customs. These clubs were popular, as they offered their members a way to connect to the communities they had left behind in their native countries, while also making them active participants in their new community. Additionally, in many of the groups, a percentage of the monthly dues provided members with other perks, such as health insurance, disability, and death benefits, which the mining company did not.

Beginning in 1887, the mining company began to either donate or sell land for the cemeteries to these local groups for their members to use. Most of the cemetery sections are privately owned by the groups they represent, although many of the clubs don't actually have deeds or any other paperwork that proves ownership, due to fires, mishandled records, or simply the passage of time. Additionally, some of the groups are no longer active in the area. The city of Roslyn owns Old City Cemetery, New City Cemetery, and the Memorial Gardens. In 1978, the cemeteries were entered into the National Register of Historic Places. In 1999, a city ordinance established the Cemetery Commission, which works as an advisory board to the City Council and Mayor about matters concerning the care and keeping of the city-owned cemeteries and the cemeteries which don't have active clubs. The commission is composed of seven appointees, who serve five-year terms. The main responsibilities of the commission include working on historical preservation of the cemeteries and handling any secretarial tasks concerning renovations or maintenance efforts. In February 2017, the Cemetery Commission was briefly disbanded by the City Council after it was discovered that members of the commission also worked with other groups who managed preservation efforts, the Roslyn Cemetery Beneficiary Committee and the Roslyn-Ronald-Cle Elum Heritage Club. This caused concern about potential conflicts of interest. After much public support, the commission was brought back a few months later in August 2017. In 2018, work began on a kiosk database, where visitor's can learn about the individual cemeteries and find specific grave sites. The development of the kiosk finished in 2021, with the grand-opening taking place over Memorial Day weekend.

== Cemetery Sections ==
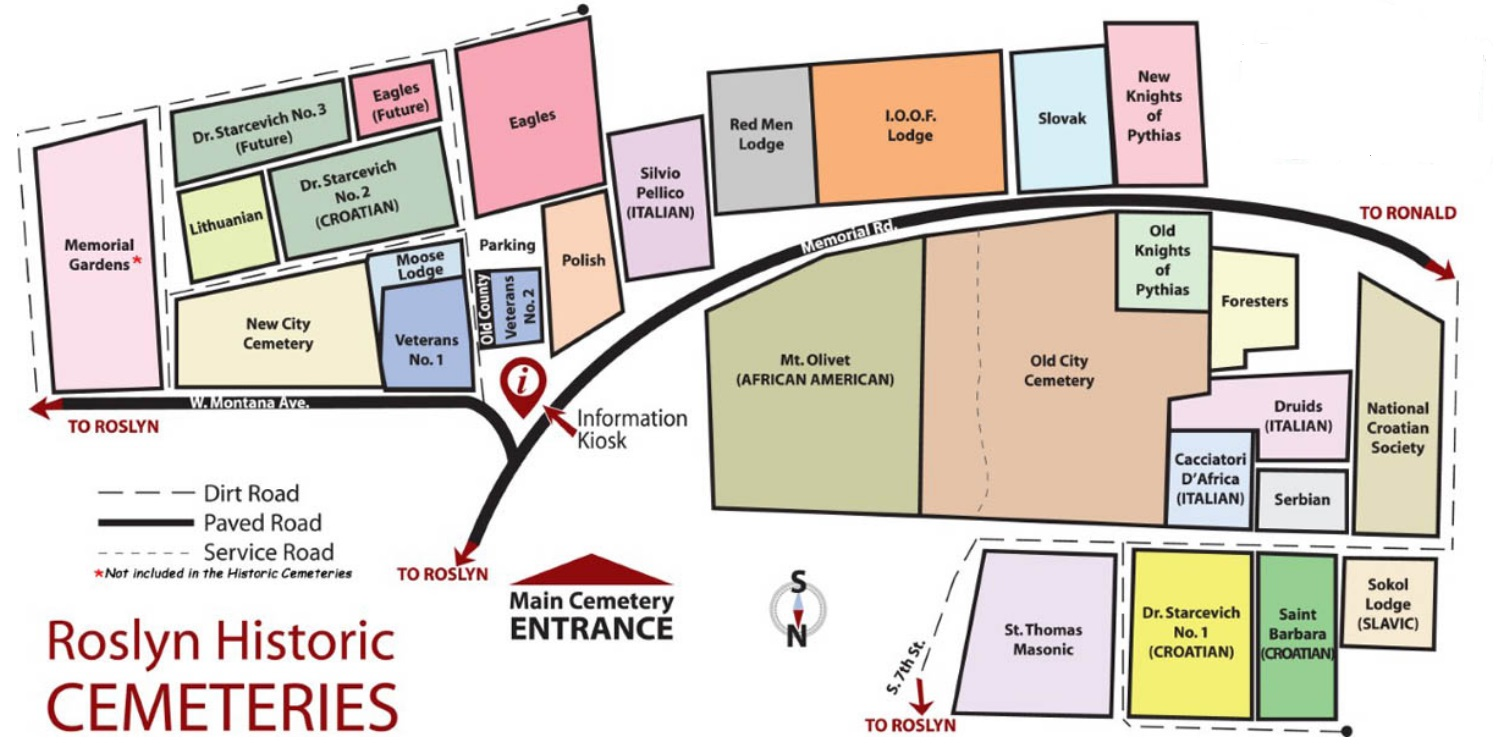

=== Cacciatori D'Africa ===
Directly translated from Italian, meaning "Hunter of Africa", Cacciatori D'Africa was an Italian hunting lodge formed on April 28, 1890. Their cemetery section was founded in 1900.

=== Dr.Starcevich ===
The Dr. Starcevich Croatian Fraternal Union (Lodge #56) was founded on October 11, 1897, by Filip Tonkovic, although the club wasn't officially incorporated until April 5, 1898 . The lodge is named after David Starčević, a Croatian politician in the 1880s and one of the founders of the Party of Rights, a nationalist party who wanted Croatia to gain their independence.

The groups owns three sections of the cemetery, with Dr. Starcevich No.1 being formed in the late-1890's. Dr. Starcevich No. 2 is currently being used, while Dr.Starevich No.3 is meant for future interments. Lodge #56 is still an active part of the Croatian Fraternal Union.

=== Druids ===
The Druids, an Italian club, was founded in 1900.

=== Eagles ===
The Fraternal Order of Eagles was founded in 1898 in Seattle, WA. The Roslyn chapter was founded on April 26, 1904. Many of the gravestones in this section feature symbols of eagles in flight, in honor of the lodge.

=== Foresters ===
The Ancient Order of the Foresters was founded in England in 1834, with clubs in North America following shortly after. The Roslyn Chapter of the Foresters was founded in the 1890s. Their cemetery's earliest grave dates back to 1894. Conversely, the most recent grave is from 1994.

=== Independent Order of the Oddfellows (I.O.O.F) ===
The Roslyn Chapter of the Independent Order of the Oddfellows, also known as I.O.O.F, was in 1888. Oddfellows organizations were first seen in the England social scene during the 1730s. After similar groups starting appearing in the United States, the American groups distinguished themselves from the original groups by calling themselves the Independent Order of the Oddfellows. The group is known by a symbol of triple rings, which appears frequently in their cemetery. While the Roslyn charter is no longer active, there are active groups in Washington state.

=== Lithuanian ===
The Lithuanian Alliance of America, also known as Susivienijimas Lietuviy Amerikoje, was founded in 1907. In addition to weekly social events, the group was also known for having age and insurance benefits. The Lithuanian Cemetery was formed in 1909. In 2009, a monument was erected in the cemetery as a celebration of the 100-year anniversary of the cemetery.

=== Moose Lodge ===
The Moose Lodge was founded in Roslyn in 1911. In 1931, the lodge combined with the Ellensburg Moose Lodge, which is still active.

=== Mt. Olivet ===
Mt. Olivet is an African-American cemetery founded in 1888. Many African American miners came to Roslyn during labor strikes, which started in the summer of 1888 and continued for a few years. During the strikes, more than 300 miners moved to the town with the families, which was the largest migration of African Americans to Washington State at the time. Cemeteries at the time were still segregated, so Mt. Olivet was founded for the local black community.

=== National Croatian Society ===
This cemetery was founded in Roslyn in the early 1900s by local members of the National Croatian Society, who had formed their own social club in the nearby town of Ronald, WA. The club merged with another local Croatian club, Dr. Starcevich Lodge.

=== New City Cemetery ===
New City Cemetery is an active section, owned and maintained by the city.

=== New Knights of Pythias ===
The New Knights of Pythias was founded in the 1930s to serve as additional room for the original cemetery, named Old Knights of Pythias.

=== Old City Cemetery ===
Old City Cemetery was founded in March 1888 and is the oldest section of the cemeteries.

=== Old Knights of Pythias ===
The Old Knights of Pythias, also known as Welcome Lodge #30, was founded in 1887.

=== Polish ===
The Polish cemetery is sometimes referred to as the Polish-Lithuanian cemetery, due to the close ties of the two nationalities throughout history.

=== Red Men Lodge ===
The Improved Order of the Red Men was founded in 1834 as an off-shoot from the political group Sons of Liberty, inspired by the Native American costumes worn during the Boston Tea Party. In July 1898, the Roslyn chapter, known as Kitchelas Tribe No.73 I.O.R.M, was formed. The group was known for their fierce patriotism and high moral standards. They were also known for being supporters of the 18th Amendment, which prohibited the sale and consumption of alcohol during the 1920s and early 30's. As such, no bartenders or other bar workers were allowed to be buried in their cemetery. In addition to burial benefits, the club also provided members with sickness and accident insurance. The Roslyn chapter disbanded in 1950, although the I.O.R.M is still active in other states.

=== Serbian ===
The Serbian Cemetery was founded in 1902 by a local lodge, S.N.F Lodge.

=== Silvio Pellico ===
Silvio Pellico was an Italian club founded in 1900. The name of the lodge comes from Italian writer Silvio Pellico, who was an active member of the revolutionary group, the Carbonari. Translatable as "charcoal makers", the Carbonari were a patriotic group that participated in protests against Italy being involved with Napoleon's government and worked towards the Unification of Italy. Pellico was arrested for his involvement with the Cabonari in October 1820. Although he was originally sentenced to death, his sentence was reduced to 15 years in prison.

=== Slovak ===
The National Slovak National Assembly #36 was founded in Roslyn on April 6, 1892. While the club was active throughout the early days of the town, it has since been disbanded.

=== Sokol Lodge ===
Sokol Lodge was formed in 1904 as a Croatian club. One of the main tenets of the club was to promote athleticism among its members. After WWI, the club dropped in popularity and soon went defunct.

=== St. Barbara's ===
In 1902, St. Barbara's was founded by locals Anton Janáček, Lucas Notar, and John Gresnik. During the same year as its founding, the Croatian-based group founded the cemetery. The group is named after Saint Barbara, an Eastern Orthodox Christian martyr from 3rd Century Lebanon. In many Eastern European countries, families regularly celebrate Saint Barbara's day, known as Варвара (Varvara), on December 17. Originally, the group was associated with G.S.K.J Union, before changing its name in 1944 to the American Fraternal Union. Many tombstones feature pictures of the deceased, which continues a long-standing tradition from native Croatia.

=== St. Thomas Masonic ===
St. Thomas Masonic Lodge was founded on June 15, 1888.

=== Veterans ===
There are two sections reserved for Veterans. Typically, volunteers take care of upkeep and also decorate the cemeteries for Memorial Day and Veterans Day.
