= Lietuva (newspaper) =

Lietuva (transl. Lithuania) was the name of several Lithuanian-language periodicals:

- Lietuva (4 issues in 1883) published by clerics at Kaunas Priest Seminary
- Lietuva (Chicago) (1892–1920) published weekly (daily in 1918–1920) by Lithuanian Americans in Chicago
- Lietuva (daily) (1919–1928) published daily in Kaunas. It was the official newspaper of the Lithuanian government. It was replaced by Lietuvos aidas.
- Lietuva (1930) published weekly by Brazilian Lithuanian in São Paulo
- Lietuva (1939–1941) published monthly in Brooklyn, New York
- Lietuva (1943–1944) published in Šiauliai by anti-Nazi resistance
- Lietuva (6 issues in 1952–1956) published in New York
- Lietuva (1992–1997) published by the Lithuanian Catholic Mission in Hamburg
- Lietuva (125 issues in 1995) published daily in Vilnius
