= Jonas Žilius-Jonila =

Lithuanian priest and critic (1870–1932)

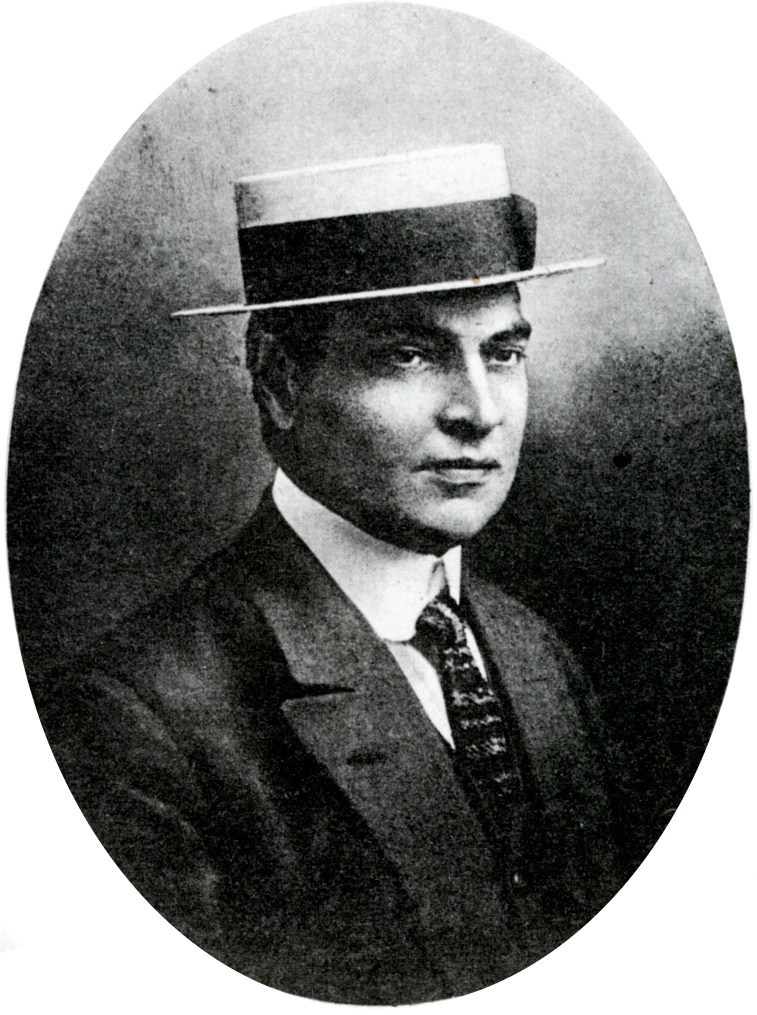

Governor of the Klaipėda Region
- In office 8 November 1925 – 29 July 1926
- Preceded by: Jonas Budrys
- Succeeded by: Karolis Žalkauskas

Personal details
- Born: 18 October 1870; Jurkšai, Suwalki Governorate, Congress Poland
- Died: 2 March 1932 (aged 61); Kopgalis, Lithuania
- Occupation: Writer, priest, poet, governor

Jonas Žilius-Jonila (born Jonas Žilinskas; 18 October 1870 – 2 March 1932) was a Lithuanian priest, writer, poet, and the governor of Lithuania's Klaipėda Region from 1925 to 1926.

== Biography ==
=== Early life ===
Jonas Žilius-Jonila was born on 18 October 1870 in the village of Jurkšai, then the Suwalki Governorate of Congress Poland. He was educated in the Marijampolė Gymnasium and Płock Seminary. In 1893 he graduated from Overbrook Priest Seminary and became a priest. In 1893 Žilius-Jonila began publishing poems and stories which were marked by romantic nationalism. From 1894 to 1898 he was the chairman of the Lithuanian Alliance of America. Žilius-Jonila was also an editor of the US-based Tėvynė newspaper and chairman of the Lithuanian committee at the 1900 Paris Exposition. In 1903, Žilius-Jonila established the Motinėlė Society. Although he stopped being a priest in 1908, he officially retired in 1921. From 1910 to 1914 Žilius-Jonila studied in Zürich and Berlin. He was active in the Lithuanian Society for the Relief of War Sufferers. From 1917 to 1919 he was a part of the Lithuanian National Council. In 1918 he was the secretary of the executive committee of the Lithuanian Seimas in New York City, where he advocated for the recognition of Lithuania's independence. In the Paris Peace Conference, Žilius-Jonila represented the Lithuanian-American community.

=== Klaipėda revolt ===
Žilius-Jonila returned to Lithuania in 1921. He resided in Klaipėda and became the consul of the Lithuanian representation in the city, as the city was not under Lithuanian control at the time, although Žilius-Jonila advocated for that:

"Due to the Allies' delay in solving the Klaipėda issue, consul Žilius suggested preparing and occupying Klaipėda by force. He asked the Lithuanian government to send a strategist officer to work at the consulate, who would prepare a plan for the uprising."

Žilius-Jonila also reported to the Lithuanian intelligence that the occupying French troops and police of Klaipėda were preparing a defense of the city. Žilius-Jonila believed that the locals would not revolt, and so instead the Lithuanian Riflemen's Union should take lead in the uprising. According to Žilius-Jonila's memoirs, an anonymous Lithuanian captain leaked the revolt's plan to Gabriel Petisné one day before it began. Jonas Budrys, who was one of the main commanders of the Klaipėda Revolt and also the region's governor, was replaced by Žilius-Jonila on 8 November 1925, although Žilius-Jonila himself would be replaced by Karolis Žalkauskas on 29 July 1926.

=== Later years ===
In 1928–1929, Žilius-Jonila published a series of books about Lithuanian mythology. Žilius-Jonila translated Adam Mickiewicz's Konrad Wallenrod, Grażyna, and the second part of Dziady. Žilius-Jonila was one of the organizers of the Land Bank of Lithuania. He regularly published articles on politics, religion, culture and society. Jonas Žilius-Jonila died on 2 March 1932 in Klaipėda. He was buried in the Kopgalis cemetery.

== Sources ==
=== Works cited ===
- Janina Markevičaitė; Liudas Gira; Adomas Kliučinskis, eds. (1921). Lietuvos albumas [Lithuanian album] (in Lithuanian). Berlin: Otto Elsner.
- Safranovas, Vasilijus (2023). 1923-ieji: Klaipėdos prijungimas prie Lietuvos. Dalyviai ir jų liudijimai [1923: The annexation of Klaipėda to Lithuania. Participants and their testimonies] (in Lithuanian). ISBN 9786094811548.
- Vaitiekus, Severinas (2023). Kas mūsų – kova įgysim [What is ours – we will win the fight] (in Lithuanian). ISBN 9786098298390.
