= Vincas Balickas =

Lithuanian diplomat

- Born: 11 May 1904; Virbalis, Suwałki Governorate, Russian Empire
- Died: 19 December 1996 (aged 92); London, United Kingdom
- Resting place: St Patrick's Roman Catholic Cemetery in Leytonstone
- Education: Vienna School of Commerce
- Occupation: Diplomat
- Known for: Long-serving diplomat for the Lithuanian government

Vincas Balickas (11 May 1904 – 19 December 1996) was a Lithuanian diplomat. He was the Lithuanian representative to the United Kingdom from 1967 to 1993. Posted to London in 1938, he continued to represent interwar Lithuania despite the Soviet occupation in 1940 thus preserving the state continuity of Lithuania.

== Career ==
After attended a gymnasium in Vilkaviškis, he went on to study at the Vienna School of Commerce graduating in 1929. From 1929 until 1931 he worked at the information and statistics department of the Bank of Lithuania. In 1931, he joined the Ministry of Foreign Affairs and headed the economics section of ELTA, the official news agency of Lithuania. In 1935, he became deputy director of the economics department at the Ministry of Foreign Affairs.

In 1938, Balickas was assigned to the Lithuanian Legation in London as an advisor on economy and trade. After the Soviet occupation of Lithuania in 1940, the United Kingdom continued to recognise the diplomats appointed by their pre-war governments throughout the Cold War. These diplomats continued to be included in the London Diplomatic List, under the heading: "no longer included in the list but still accepted by Her Majesty's Government as personally enjoying certain diplomatic courtesies". They however maintained a relatively low profile given the precarious nature of their position and did not form a government in exile during the period of the Soviet rule of Lithuania. In the post-war years, the legation worked with Lithuanian refugees by organizing aid and helping with passports and other paperwork. As late as 1988, the legation still issued Lithuanian passports to sailors.

In 1967, after the death of Bronius Kazys Balutis, who served as Lithuania's Envoy Extraordinary and Minister Plenipotentiary in London since 1934, Balickas became chargé d'affaires. The building of the Lithuanian legation at 17 Essex Villas was left to the "People of Lithuania" but formally recorded in Balickas' name so that the Soviets could not confiscate it in case UK revoked its recognition of the pre-war Lithuania. Over the years, Balickas transformed the legation into a personal residence. Balickis actively participated in the cultural life of the Lithuanian community in London, particularly in the activities of the Lithuanian Association in Great Britain.

Lithuania declared independence in March 1990 and was recognized de jure by UK on 27 August 1991. Official diplomatic relations were re-established on 4 September 1991. Despite objections by the Lithuanian community in London, Balickas was chosen as the first Ambassador of Lithuania on 23 October 1991. Balickas was of frail health, did not speak fluent English despite the years spent in UK, and was unwilling to participate in various events advocating for Lithuania's independence. He treated the legation building as his personal residence and allowed the new embassy to use only the attic. He officially presented his credentials to Queen Elizabeth II on 8 July 1992. In June 1993, he was awarded the Commander's Cross of the Order of the Lithuanian Grand Duke Gediminas. Due to increasingly poor health, Balickas officially retired as ambassador on 7 July 1993, though continued to be the honorary advisor to the embassy until his death in December 1996.

== See also ==
- List of Lithuanian diplomats (1940–1990)
