= Pilotiškės =

Village in Lithuania

Coordinates: 54.552°N 23.714°E

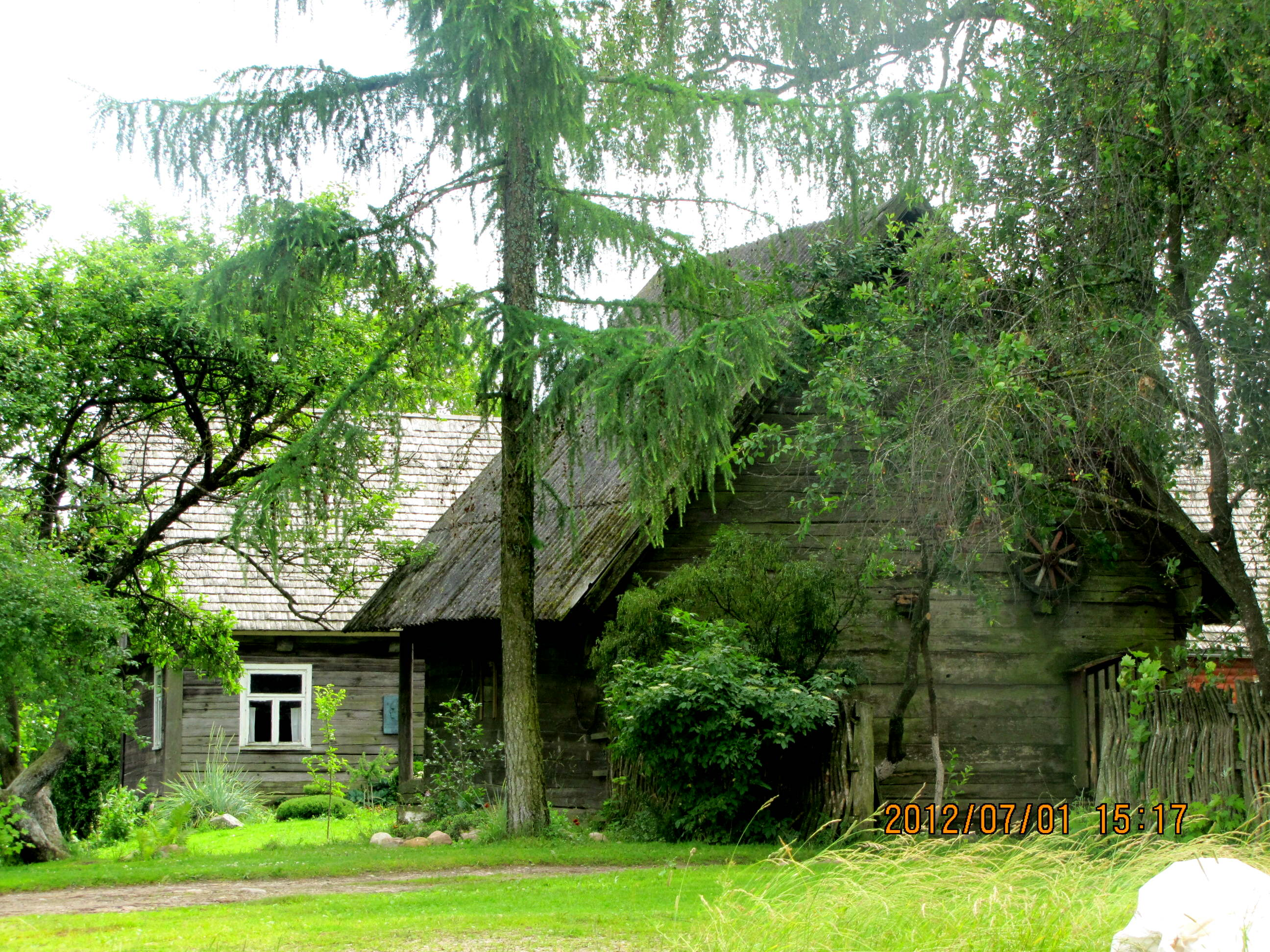
The homestead of Putinas

Pilotiškės is a village in Prienai District Municipality, Kaunas County, Lithuania.

In 2001 its population was 44. In 2021 it dropped to 17.

The village is best known as the birthplace of Vincas Mykolaitis-Putinas, Lithuanian poet and writer, and there is Putinas's house museum in his birth home.

The mound Krušakalnis by the village was described in Putinas's novel Altorių šešėly (In the Shadow of the Altars) under the name Aušrakalnis, and the mound has become known as Aušrakalnis since then.
