= Draugas =

Lithuanian newspaper in Chicago, Illinois

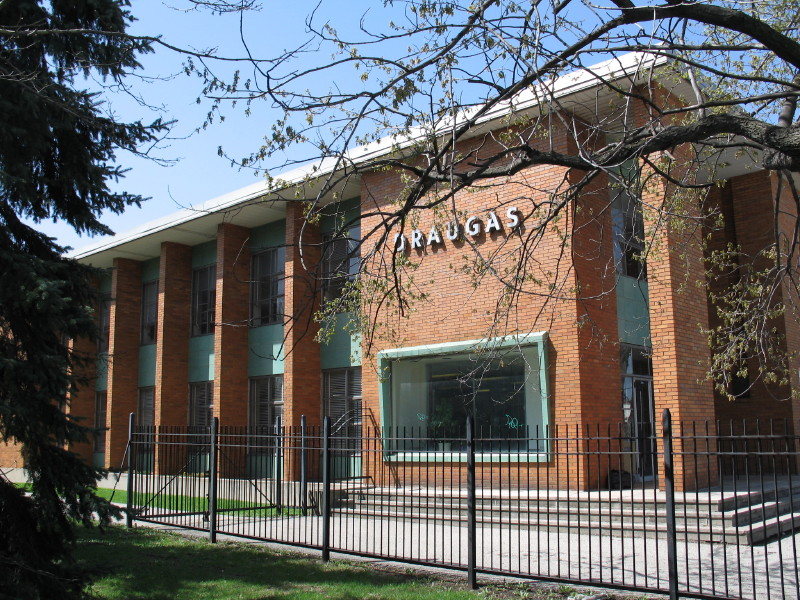
- Draugas building in Chicago, Illinois
- Type: currently thrice-weekly newspaper
- Format: Tabloid
- Publisher: Lithuanian Catholic Press Society
- Editor-in-chief: Ramunė Lapas
- Founded: 1909
- Language: Lithuanian
- Headquarters: 4545 W. 63rd Street; Chicago, IL 60629; United States
- Price: US$2 (In the US)
- Sister newspapers: Draugas News
- Website: draugas.org

Draugas (English: Friend) is a Lithuanian-language newspaper based in Chicago. It is the only Lithuanian daily newspaper published outside of Lithuania. Until 2011, the newspaper was published five days a week, except Sundays and Mondays. It is currently published three days a week, Tuesday, Thursday, and Saturday. It is read not only in the United States, but in Canada, South America, Australia, and Europe as well.

== History ==
Draugas is the oldest continuously published Lithuanian language newspaper anywhere in the world.

Founded as a weekly Roman Catholic paper, Draugas published its first edition on July 12, 1909, in Wilkes-Barre, Pennsylvania. In July 1912, editorial offices were relocated to Chicago, Illinois. During the first 3 months of 1916, Draugas continued to be published as a weekly edition (vol 8), and beginning March 31, 1916, a daily (6 times per week) edition was added (volume 1). Beginning in 1917, Draugas continued as a daily, with volume 2, publishing initially 6 days per week, and later 5 days per week. In 2011 publication frequency was reduced to three days per week.

The Marian Fathers have been involved in the publishing of Draugas since 1916, and the current publisher, the Lithuanian Catholic Press Society, was established as a partnership between lay members and members of the Marian Order.

During the Soviet occupation of Lithuania up to now, the newspaper was and still remains the backbone of the Lithuanian diaspora.

Currently, Draugas is published by the Lithuanian Catholic Press Society in Chicago, Illinois. Draugas contains news and public interest articles on political, religious, cultural, social, economic, sports, and other public interest themes, often on Lithuanian-related topics, and announcements, and paid advertising. The Tuesday issue is twelve pages, the Thursday issue is sixteen pages, and the Saturday issue is twenty-four pages, which includes a weekly eight-page supplement Kultūra meaning Culture and subtitled Menas Literatūra Mokslas meaning Art Literature Science. A searchable digital archive of PDF files of all issues going back to 1909 is currently under development and is accessible through the Draugas website, for free up until the year 2008, and for subscribers to the newspapers for the years 2008 to the present.

Numerous Lithuanian books are available via the Draugas publishing office. Draugas used to print both its newspaper and many books in-house at its headquarters, but now outsources all of its printing.

Draugas celebrated its 100th anniversary in 2009. In November 2013, the Lithuanian Catholic Press Society also started publishing Draugas News, a monthly newspaper on Lithuanian topics written in the English language, available by separate subscription. In November 2014, the Lithuanian Catholic Press Society assumed publication of a bimonthly glossy magazine, titled Lithuanian Heritage, previously published by Baltech, Inc., a company owned by Valentinas Ramonis. Lithuanian Heritage which comes out every 2 months, and the monthly Draugas News are available as a single subscription, and are targeted at readers interested in getting information about Lithuanian culture and life in English.

== Staff ==
Such prominent Lithuanian émigré writers and public figures as Aloyzas Baronas, Kazys Bradūnas, Česlovas Grincevičius, Bronius Kviklys, Rev. Vaclovas Bagdanavičius, Aušrelė Liulevičienė, Kazys Pakštas, Rev. Juozas Prunskis, Leonardas Šimutis, and others worked on the editorial staff.

The current chief editor of the newspaper is Ramunė Lapas. The editor of the Saturday Kultūra supplement is Renata Šerelytė. The layout artist is Jonas Kuprys. The editor of Draugas News is Vida Kuprytė.
