= Dirva =

Lithuanian-language newspaper in the United States

- Owner(s): Apolonas B. Bartuševičius; Kazys S. Karpius
- Publisher: Ohio Lithuanian Publishing Company; American Lithuanian Press & Radio Association "Viltis"
- Editor: Vincas K. Jokubynas, then Kazys S. Karpius (Karpavicius)
- Founded: August 28, 1916; 109 years ago
- Language: Lithuanian
- City: Cleveland, Ohio
- Country: United States
- ISSN: 2641-0060

Dirva (transl. field) is a Lithuanian-language weekly newspaper of Cleveland, Ohio established in 1916.

== History ==
The paper started as Santaika ("Peace") on November 25, 1915 and was renamed as Dirva ("Field") on August 28, 1916. In 1920, Dirva was the only Lithuanian newspaper in Cleveland. Dirva circulated to other cities, particularly Pittsburgh and Detroit, and other states with Lithuanian American communities (Connecticut, Pennsylvania, Maryland, Michigan).

Initially, Dirva was published by the Ohio Lithuanian Publishing Company, run by businessman Apolonas B. Bartuševičius (Bartoszewicz). In 1925, newspaper's editor Kazys S. Karpius (Karpavicius) gained a controlling interest in the newspaper. During World War II, owner-editor Karpius maintained a centrist position as both anti-fascist and anti-communist. The newspaper generally published local, national, and international news especially if related to Lithuania or Lithuanians. It also published other items, including announcements, movie reviews, union news, excerpts from fiction, and articles about authors.

In 1952, the publishing of Dirva was taken over by the non-profit American Lithuanian Press & Radio Association "Viltis". On 30 July 1975, the printing press of Dirva burned down together with equipment and archives. However, the newspaper was quickly reestablished.

As more Lithuanians arrived to United States from displaced persons camps in post-World War II Europe, Dirva was able to increase its circulation from weekly to twice a week in 1958–1959 and three times a week in 1960–1968. It reduced its circulation to twice a week in 1968, returning to its original weekly schedule in 1980 and then reducing the circulation to twice a month in 2006. In 1995, its circulation was 3,000 copies per issue.

As of 2022, Dirva remained as one of the last Lithuanian-language American newspapers.

== Editors ==
The newspaper was edited by:

- Vincas K. Jokubynas – 1916–1917
- Kazys S. Karpius (Karpavičius) – 1918–1948
- Vincas Rastenis – 1948–1950
- Balys Gaidžiūnas – 1951–1962, 1985–1994
- Jonas Čiuberkis – 1962–1968
- Vytautas Gedgaudas – 1968–1985
- Anicetas Bundonis – 1994–1995
- Jonas Jasaitis – 1996–2001
- Editorial board – 2001–2005
- Vytautas Radžius – 2005–2013
- Gediminas Markevičius – since 2014
