= Juozas Adomaitis-Šernas =

Scientific writer, book smuggler

- Born: Juozas Adomaitis; 7 August 1859; Šmuiliškė, Augustów Governorate, Congress Poland
- Died: 5 August 1922 (aged 62); Chicago, United States
- Resting place: Lithuanian National Cemetery
- Education: Marijampolė Gymnasium
- Occupations: Writer, journalist, editor

Juozas Adomaitis known by his pen name Šernas (1859–1922) was a Lithuanian non-fiction writer. He contributed to the Lithuanian-language newspapers Aušra and briefly served as editor of Varpas. In 1895, he moved to the United States where he worked as editor of the Lithuanian weekly Lietuva. He published about 20 popular science books about biology, ethnology, geography, history of writing.

== Biography ==
=== In the Russian Empire ===
Adomaitis was born in a small village near Lukšiai where he attended a primary school. He then studied at the Marijampolė Gymnasium, but in the sixth year his father died and he returned to the family farm. Adomaitis wanted to continue his studies and left for Warsaw in 1882. He began contributing to the Lithuanian press in 1885. He published articles in Aušra printed in East Prussia and Unija and Lietuviškasis balsas published in the United States. He also wrote about the Lithuanian National Revival for the Polish weekly Kraj in Saint Petersburg. Adomaitis joined a group of Lithuanian students in Warsaw which established Varpas and became its editor.

Since Lithuanian-language publications were banned, he attracted police attention. He first fled to Ragnit (now Neman) in 1890, but the German police intended to hand him over to the Russians. He then returned to Šakiai with fake papers and left for Bremen in 1892. In 1894, he briefly returned to Lithuania to live with Vincas Kudirka, but soon emigrated to the United States.

=== In the United States ===
In December 1895, Adomaitis became editor of the Lithuanian weekly Lietuva published in Chicago and continued to edit it until 1912. He was replaced by Bronius Kazys Balutis as the editor, but continued to work as an assistant editor until June 1918. Adomaitis emphasized the need for education as it was the primary means to lift oneself from poverty and misery.

In addition to writing some 2,000 articles to various periodicals, he also published about 20 popular science books about the planet Earth and the Solar System (1896), geography (1899, 1902, 1906), dinosaurs (1900), biology (1901), forces of nature (1904), meteorology (1907), domesticated animals and plants (1901), hygiene and microbes (1905), ethnology (1903), ancient history (1904), history of writing (1906), etc. These books, published before there were any Lithuanian schools, were intended to fill the education gap.

Adomaitis remained unmarried. He died in 1920 in Chicago and was buried at the Lithuanian National Cemetery.
