= Kazys Bradūnas =

Lithuanian poet and editor

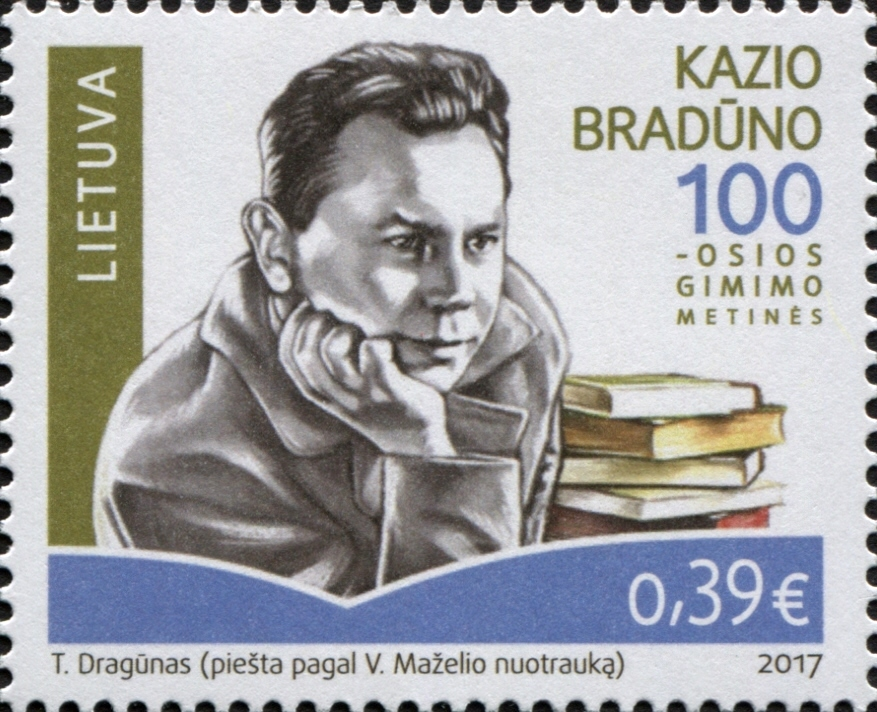
Kazys Bradūnas on a 2017 stamp of Lithuania

Kazys Bradūnas (11 February 1917 – 9 February 2009) was a Lithuanian émigré poet and editor.

== Life ==
Kazys Bradūnas was born in Kiršai in the Lithuania District of Ober Ost, a territory occupied by the German Empire, now in the Vilkaviškis District Municipality, Lithuania.

He graduated from Vilnius University where he studied Lithuanian language and literature. During the post-war period he lived in displaced persons camps in Germany. In 1944 Bradūnas emigrated to the United States, and lived in Baltimore and Chicago. In 1995 he returned to Lithuania and lived in the capital, Vilnius, until his death.

== Editorial work ==
Bradūnas edited literary and cultural journals Literatūros lankai, Aidai and the Saturday cultural supplement of the Lithuanian daily Draugas in Chicago.

He was one of the most virile émigré editors of collective works on poetry and literature. Bradūnas together with the literature critic and professor of Ohio State University, Rimvydas Šilbajoris, edited an anthology Lietuvių egzodo literatūra, 1940–1990 (Literature of Lithuanian Exodus, 1940–1990) published in Chicago, 1992.

== The Earth Literary Movement ==
Bradūnas was one of the founders of the "Žemė" (Earth) literary movement and one of the editors of the same name anthology published in 1951 in Los Angeles. The participants of the "Žemė" anthology were Kazys Bradūnas, Juozas Kėkštas, Vytautas Mačernis (post-humously), Henrikas Nagys, Alfonsas Nyka-Niliūnas.

The movement was advocating Lithuanian poetry with distinct roots in the earth, drawing its strength from Lithuania's agricultural heritage and folklore. "They fused the Lithuanian spirit with the pathos of the modern world's poetic forms and, it can be said, laid the foundation for the modern poetry to be written later in Lithuania" () (per Kornelijus Platelis).

== Poetry ==
Linguist, author and professor at Ohio State University Rimvydas Šilbajoris wrote about Bradūnas’ poetry in Lithuanian Quarterly Journal of Arts and Sciences "Lituanus": "Lyric poetry, consisting as it does of brief statements of experience, was able to respond most quickly and sensitively to the fact of exile. Some poets reacted in simple and naive anguish, like small children awakened suddenly in an unfamiliar place.

Of these, Bradūnas communicated most directly the physical sense of loss which overwhelms a farmer torn away from the familiar objects in his native house and field. His first book in exile, The Alien Bread (1945), is full of small painful vignettes of daily experience where the smell of a flower, a bend in the river, or the pale light of the morning would deceive and comfort the traveler by their intimate familiarity — only to shock him afterwards with the realization that the flower was not known at home, the river bears some strange German name, and the morning promises another day of hard labor for alien masters. Naturally enough, the dispossessed farmer, Bradūnas, was at the center of the new mythology.

In several collections of poetry entitled Nine Ballads (1955), Marshland Fires (1958) and The Silver Bridles (1964), he elaborated the concept of man's existence as a sacrifice at the altar of life and thus also at the altar of both pagan and Christian God, in the native land, over the course of centuries.

His poems are complex in their implied references to the continuum of life through all the Lithuanian generations which had sacrificed themselves in order that their land should prosper green again and again".

== Works ==
=== Poetry collections ===
- Vilniaus varpai : sonetai. (1943)
- Pėdos arimuos : eilėraščiai. (1944)
- Svetimoji duona : eilėraščiai. (1945)
- Apeigos : eilėraščiai. (1948)
- Devynios baladės. (1955)
- Morenų ugnys : eilėraščiai. (1958)
- Sidabrinės kamanos. (1964)
- Alkana kelionė : [eilėraščiai]. (1976)
- Užeigoje prie Vilniaus vieškelio (1981)
- Prierašai : [eilėraščiai]. (1983)
- Krikšto vanduo Joninių naktį : [eilėraščiai]. (1987)
- Duona ir druska : poezija. (1992)
- Apie žemę ir dangų : eilėraščiai. (1997)

=== Selected works ===
- Įaugom Nemuno upyne : rinktinė. (1990)
- Prie vieno stalo : poezijos rinktinė. (1990)
- Iš grumsto ir iš dvasios. (1994)
- Lietuviškoji trilogija. (1994)
- Sutelktinė : eilėraščiai. (2001)

=== Poems ===
- Maras : poema. (1947)
- Sonatos ir fugos : susitikimai su Čiurlioniu. (1967)
- Donelaičio kapas : eilėraščiai. (1970)
- Pokalbiai su karalium : anno domini 1323–1973. (1973)

=== Edited works of poetry and literature ===
- Žemė (1951)
- Lietuvių poezija išeivijoje, 1945–1971 (1971)
- "Poezija" by Vytautas Mačernis (1961)
- Lietuvių literatūra svetur, 1945–1967 (1968)
- Antologija "Keturi" (1986)
- Lietuvių egzodo literatūra, 1940–1990 (1992)

=== Libretto ===
- Libretto for the opera, Magnus Dux, by Darius Lapinskas (1984).

== Awards and honors ==
- Lithuanian National Prize for Culture and Arts (1992)
- Officer's Cross of the Order of the Lithuanian Grand Duke Gediminas (1994, decree no. 343)
- Winner of National Poetry Contest of the Poetry Spring festival (2002)

== Sources ==
- Lithuanian Literature Encyclopedia
- Poetry of Kazys Bradunas in English
- Poetry of Kazys Bradunas in Lithuanian
