= Lietuva (Chicago) =

Lietuva (transl. Lithuania) was a Lithuanian-language newspaper published by Lithuanian Americans in Chicago from 1892 to 1920. It was a liberal weekly. It was one of the earliest Lithuanian-language newspapers published in the United States and played an important role in promoting unity and cultural development among Lithuanian immigrants during the late 19th and early 20th centuries. Its primary owner was Antanas Olšauskas who was forced to sell the newspaper due to financial difficulties in 1917. The new owners turned the newspaper into a daily in 1918, but Lietuva was discontinued in May 1920.

== History ==
=== Establishment ===
In 1892, Polish newspapers Nowe Życie and Reforma went bankrupt. Stasys Rakošius (also known as Stanley Rokos, Rokosz or Ragaišis), owner of the printing press, decided to establish the first Lithuanian newspaper in Chicago Lietuva. At the time, there were three Lithuanian periodicals in the United States: Vienybė lietuvninkų, Saulė, and Garsas, and all of them were published in Pennsylvania. The first 4-page issue was published on December 10, 1892. Rakošius had disagreements with newspaper's editor Jonas Girnius and quickly sold the printing press to Vincas Žaliauskas. The feud between Rakošius and Žaliauskas ended in Žaliauskas' arrest. The newspaper was sold for the second time in six months, but continued to struggle financially.

In the end, Antanas Olšauskas and three other men agreed to take over Lietuva for US$350 (equivalent to $12,542 in 2025) in June 1893. At the time, the newspaper had only 400 subscribers. Despite difficult economic conditions (see: Panic of 1893), the newspaper gained popularity and the printing press relocated to more spacious premises in 1894. Olšauskas established a successful bank and other businesses and was able to buy out other owners of Lietuva remaining the sole shareholder of the printing press in 1901.

=== Growth and dissolution ===
The newspaper and the printing press continued to grow. In 1900, Lietuva participated in a collective exhibit of American periodicals at the Paris Exposition. In January 1906, Lietuva doubled from four pages to eight. In December 1907, the printing acquired a Linotype machine – the first among Lithuanian publishers in the United States. By 1917, the printing press had three Linotype machines and seven permanent employees. The press workers complained of long hours and low pay. In 1906, they were able to negotiate 49-hour work week (reduced from 55 hours) and weekly pay of $16.50.

In 1916, Olšauskas' bank experienced a bank run and Olšauskas was forced to sell his businesses, including Lietuva. The printing press was acquired by J. J. Bačiūnas and Jonas P. Pajauskas in 1916, followed by the newspaper in June 1917. They established the Lithuanian Publishing Co. which had capital of $20,000 (equivalent to $502,597 in 2025). The new owners turned the newspaper into a daily in 1918, but Lietuva was discontinued in May 1920.

== Content ==
Antanas Olšauskas was primarily in charge of content starting with the 24th issue. Experienced journalist Juozas Adomaitis-Šernas became chief editor of Lietuva in December 1895. In March 1912, Bronius Kazys Balutis effectively took over the newspaper and edited it until June 1919.

The newspaper became a liberal publication which advocated for unity among Lithuanian immigrants, campaigned for a Lithuanian representative in the U.S. Congress, promoted entrepreneurship and self-improvement, discussed relations between Poles and Lithuanians, debated political issues concerning Lithuania. Under Adomaitis-Šernas, the newspaper printed works of Lithuanian literature and was even classified as a literary newspaper. Balutis disliked both major branches of the Lithuanian movement – the socialist and Catholic camps – and advocated for the "middle road", i.e. Lithuanian nationalism. As an editor, Balutis stayed away from party politics and instead valued fact checking, polite discussions, and arguments based on facts.

During World War I, Lietuva shifted to cover the news of the war and political developments in Lithuania. It published a daily two-page supplement with news from the war and Lithuania that was also edited by Balutis. The war called for unity among the various political fractions, and Lietuva actively supported and promoted the efforts to create a unified political organization of Lithuanian Americans.

== Other publications ==
In addition to publishing Lietuva, the printing house also published Lithuanian books. In 1894–1917, it published a total of 131 books, of which 45 were original and others were translations. These included 28 books on fairytales, legends, novellas, 31 theater plays, 20 popular science works, 15 texts on history, ethnography, culture, and three dictionaries. Most important books included the Lithuanian–English dictionary by Antanas Lalis (1903), history of Lithuanians in Chicago by Antanas Olšauskas (1900), work on the origins of Lithuanians (promoting the discredited theories that Lithuanians hailed from the Balkans or Anatolia) by Jonas Šliūpas (1899), three-volumes of Lithuanian fairytales collected by Jonas Basanavičius (1903–1904), translation of drama about king Mindaugas by Juliusz Słowacki (1900), various popular science books by Juozas Adomaitis-Šernas.

== Editors ==
The newspaper editors were:

- Jonas Girnius (1892–1893)
- Petras Zacharevičius (1893)
- Antanas Olšauskas (1893–1895)
- Juozas Adomaitis-Šernas (1895–1912)
- Bronius Kazys Balutis (1912–1919)
- Pijus Norkus (1919–1920)
- Juozas Gedeminas (1920)

== See also ==
- List of Lithuanian-language periodicals (up to 1904)

== Bibliography ==
- Dapkutė, Daiva (June 12, 2019). "Juozas Bačiūnas: pirmasis ir vienintelis grynorius, tapęs PLB pirmininku". Pasaulio lietuvis (in Lithuanian). Pasaulio lietuvių bendruomenė.
- Gargasaitė, Dalia (1983). "JAV Lietuvių spaustuvės (iki 1904 m.)". Knygotyra (in Lithuanian). 16 (9–1): 82–94.
- Kasparavičius, Gediminas (2019). "XIX a. pab. – XX a. pr. lietuviai verslininkai JAV" [Lithuanian businessmen in the United States at the turn of the 20th century]. Oikos: lietuvių migracijos ir diasporos studijos (in Lithuanian). 28: 21–47. ISSN 1822-5152.
- Raguotis, Bronius (2015). "Amerikos lietuviškos spaustuvės ir spaustuvininkai (1874–1919)". Žurnalistikos tyrimai (in Lithuanian). 9. ISSN 2029-1132.
- Raguotis, Bronius (March 25, 2022) [2018]. "Lietuva". Visuotinė lietuvių enciklopedija (in Lithuanian). Mokslo ir enciklopedijų leidybos centras.
- Širvydas, Vytautas (1951). Bronius Kazys Balutis: jo gyvenimas ir darbai (in Lithuanian). Sodus, Michigan: J. J. Bachunas. OCLC 1090100911.
- Skirius, Juozas (2000). "Tautos vienybės idėjos propagavimas B.K. Balučio redaguojamoje "Lietuvoje" 1912-1916 m." (PDF). Istorija (in Lithuanian). 45. ISSN 1392-0456.
