= Lithuanian Alliance of America =

Club based in Manhattan, New York

- U.S. National Register of Historic Places
- New York State Register of Historic Places
- New York City Landmark
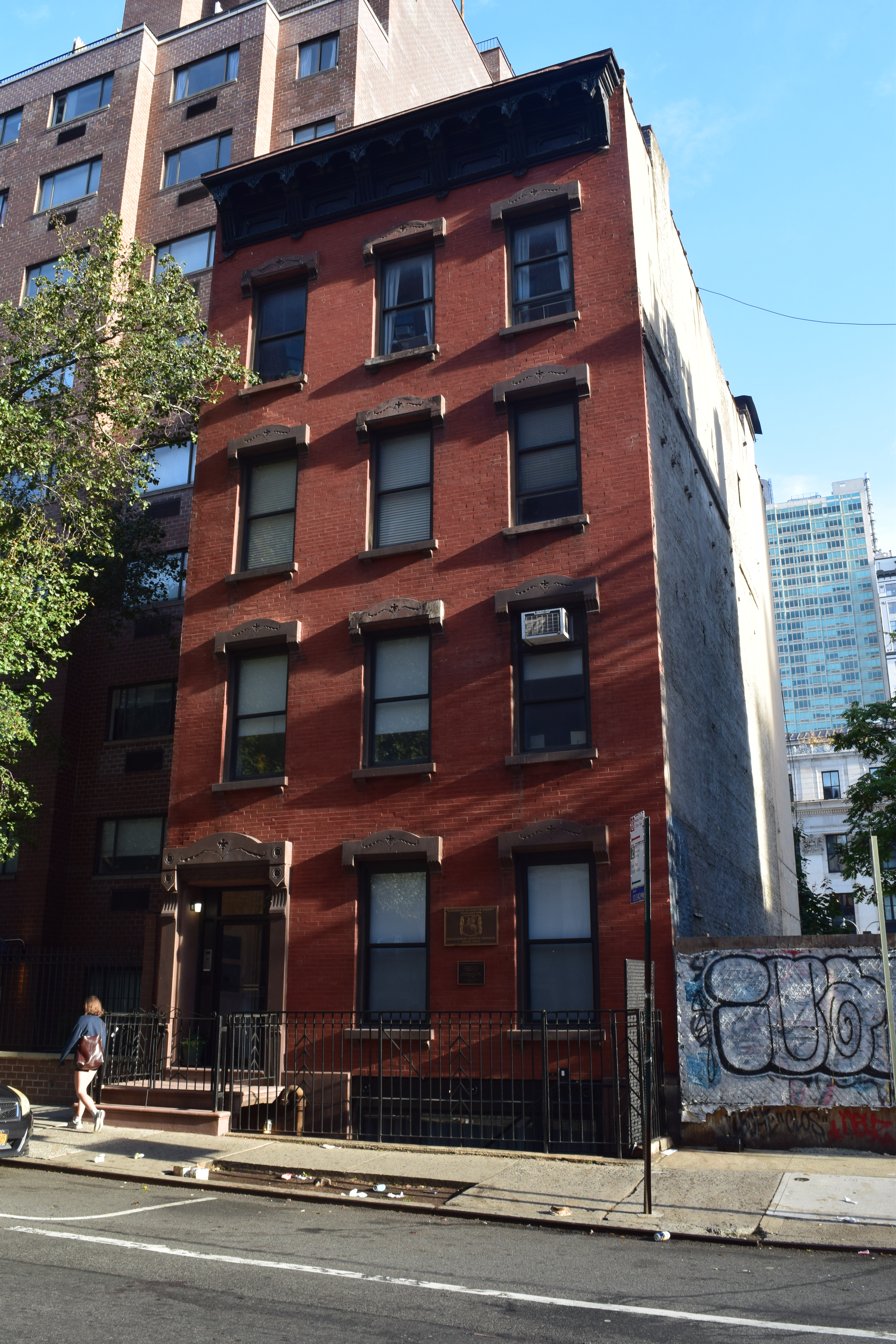

- Location within Manhattan Location within New York City Location within New York Location within the United States
- Location: 307 West 30th St., Manhattan, New York
- Coordinates: 40°45′00″N 73°59′45″W
- Area: 0.06 acres (0.024 ha)
- Built: 1876–1877
- Architect: James C. Springstead
- Architectural style: neo-Grec
- NRHP reference No.: 100008334
- NYSRHP No.: 06101.021779
- NYCL No.: 2695

Significant dates
- Added to NRHP: 2022-11-02
- Designated NYSRHP: 2022-09-08
- Designated NYCL: 2026-04-04

The Lithuanian Alliance of America (LAA; Lithuanian: Susivienijimas lietuvių Amerikoje or SLA) is an organization of Lithuanian Americans. The club, founded in 1886 and incorporated in 1889, initially sold insurance and published a periodical, Tėvynė. The LAA's clubhouse since 1910 is located at 307 West 30th Street in the Chelsea neighborhood of Manhattan in New York City, New York, U.S. The clubhouse, a converted brick rowhouse, is on the National Register of Historic Places and a New York City designated landmark.

The LAA, established by Jonas Šliūpas and his associates, was initially based in Pennsylvania. Originally, the LAA included both secular pro-independence and Catholic members. The Catholics split off in 1906 due to schisms over the organization's leadership. The organization moved to New York in 1910, and the club had over 300 nationwide chapters by the mid-1920s. Communist members split off into their own group in 1930. Membership declined after World War II, in part because of changing insurance laws and increasing assimilation of Lithuanians. By the 1970s, the LAA had pivoted more toward presenting events at its clubhouse. The LAA building also displays Lithuanian art and holds records of its members, and the LAA continues to publish Tėvynė as an online periodical.

== History ==
=== 1880s to 1900s ===
The Lithuanian Alliance of America (LAA) was established in 1886 by Jonas Šliūpas and his associates. Initially, it was known in Lithuanian as Susivienijimas visų lietuvninkų Amerike (in English, Union of All Lithuanians in America). It was one of several fraternal societies for Lithuanian Americans; within the U.S., nine such groups had been founded by 1886. Three years elapsed before the LAA was formally incorporated in 1889. Initially located in Pennsylvania, it recorded 400 members at its convention that year. In its early years, the LAA's members were split ideologically between nationalists (who favored Lithuanian independence from the Russian Empire) and other groups. The nationalists won out, appointing Alexander Burba as the LAA's president.

The LAA's duties initially included distributing funds to sick and disabled members and to deceased members' families, as well as helping the unemployed. In the 1890s, the LAA began publishing books to help Lithuanian immigrants acclimate to American customs, and it also published Lithuanian-language works and literature by Lithuanian authors that had been banned by the Russian Empire. The LAA also began helping newly arrived immigrants passing through Ellis Island in New York Harbor. By 1896, the LAA had 2,080 members across 61 chapters or "lodges". The alliance also engaged in political advocacy; in 1897 alone, they protested an immigration restriction bill along with the deaths of five Lithuanian miners in the Lattimer massacre. That year, the LAA changed its Lithuanian name to Susivienijimas lietuvių Amerikoje (SLA).

Initially, the LAA had large amounts of secular nationalist and Catholic members, who disagreed on whether the organization should focus on Lithuanian independence or religious matters. Šliūpas's anti-clerical views exacerbated the disputes between the two groups, and he was himself ejected from the LAA. The disputes between the secular nationalists and Catholics deepened during the LAA's 1901 convention, and the Catholics created the Lithuanian Roman Catholic Alliance of America in 1906; the LAA remained under the nationalists' leadership. The LAA helped Lithuanian prisoners-of-war and exiled Lithuanians during the Russian Revolution of 1905. The LAA continued to grow, requiring them to find a new headquarters.

=== 1910s to 1950s ===
In 1910, the LAA acquired a rowhouse on 30th Street in Chelsea, Manhattan, from the Ashley brothers. The LAA had chosen that house for its central location near Ellis Island and the new Pennsylvania Station, having rejected other sites as far away as Boston. The LAA converted the house to a clubhouse with a printing press and offices, and it began hosting board meetings in the house. The New York Times described the LAA's acquisition of the house as "evidence of the modern day changes" in the surrounding neighborhood. By then, the alliance had about 9,500 members nationwide, and was administering in-house life insurance policies. Upon the LAA's 25th anniversary the next year, it hosted a convention in Chicago (a major Lithuanian-American population center) with various celebrations. The LAA remained active as a pro-independence organization; Jonas Basanavičius, who later became the first signatory of the 1918 Act of Independence of Lithuania, was among the LAA clubhouse's visitors.

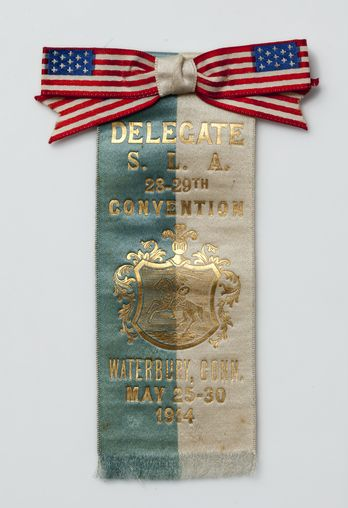
Badge of a delegate to the LAA (SLA) convention, 1914

During the German Imperial Army's occupation of Lithuania in World War I, the LAA sought to aid occupied Lithuania and its inhabitants, and members demanded that the Germans recognize Lithuania. Because of the Spanish flu in 1918, the LAA could not afford to pay out such a large amount of death benefits simultaneously; to remain solvent, it raised fees on insurance policy holders. After Lithuania declared independence that year, the LAA helped raise funds for the country itself and for Lithuanian educational institutions. The LAA also sponsored an ultimately successful petition in 1921–1922 to convince U.S. president Warren G. Harding to recognize Lithuania. By the mid-1920s, the LAA had over 300 nationwide chapters; these chapters, located in 24 U.S. states and Canada, counted over 18,000 members between them.

When the Great Depression began in 1929, the LAA offered short-term loans and mortgages to help unemployed members who could not pay insurance premiums. Some members defaulted on their loans and mortgages and had to give up bonds and property to the LAA, which formed a finance committee. Communist members also disagreed with the LAA's leadership, sometimes resulting in conflicts; for instance, one-third of the delegates at the LAA's 1930 convention were removed when the communists disrupted the meeting. After that convention, 6,000 LAA members left to form their organization, the Association of Lithuanian Workers. During the 1930s, the LAA continued to advocate for an independent Lithuania, and it issued literature to Lithuanian Americans; it published a commemorative booklet in 1936 for its 50th anniversary. The LAA also rented out the upper floors of its building. Several thousand members joined during the decade, raising the LAA's assets to almost $2 million by 1938. With the outbreak of World War II, about 1,200 LAA members were enlisted into the United States Armed Forces, of which 17 died in combat. To cover military members' dues, civilian members paid an extra 15 cents a month for 11 months.

The LAA recorded 14,855 members in 1944 (spread across 346 lodges), although membership would decline from then onward. Increasing social safety nets in the United States, such as Medicaid and private health insurance, began to supplant the LAA's insurance services. Changes in New York state's insurance laws prompted many members to stop buying insurance policies from the LAA, and the LAA itself had to restructure its insurance policies. In the mid-20th century, the LAA began focusing on helping new immigrants from Soviet-occupied Lithuania, and it also funded specialized political and cultural groups. Internal rivalries within the LAA subsided, as members united against the Soviet occupation. The LAA building was used for meetings of LAA's board and two of its lodges; the printing plant and offices of the LAA's newspaper, Tėvynė; and storage facilities for the LAA's records.

=== 1960s to present ===
In the late 1960s, the LAA began paying out dividends to policy holders, and it established a pension plan. The LAA also combined 13 of its charity funds—which dealt with specific causes such as orphans and widows—into a single philanthropic fund in 1968. By the next year, the LAA's membership had declined to 8,663, split across 262 chapters. By then, Lithuanian immigrants tended to assimilate into American society, decreasing the need for the LAA's services. At the LAA's 1972 convention, its president Paul P. Dargis noted that the club would continue to support Lithuanian Americans and that it "in one way or another will contribute to the restoration of Lithuania's independence".

The LAA's newspaper, Tėvynė, was relocated out of the LAA building in 1971, and the LAA commissioned a 630-page historical study of itself. The LAA continued to support philanthropic causes, such as in 1972–1973, when floods in Pennsylvania's Wyoming Valley destroyed many members' homes. In 1976, the LAA renovated its Manhattan building to allow events to be hosted there. By then, the neighborhood around the building was undergoing redevelopment, spurred by the construction of the nearby Madison Square Garden. The crumbling exterior was reclad with aluminum panels. The first-floor administrative offices became an assembly hall for community events, such as Day of Restoration of the State of Lithuania celebrations every February 16. Thereafter, the LAA focused more on cultural activities. After Lithuanian independence from the Soviet Union in 1990, the LAA's members provided financial support for the newly independent country.

The LAA building continued to host the organization's archives in the 21st century. The LAA divested its insurance business in 2012. With this divestment, the LAA modified its charter and focused primarily on cultural events. The interior was renovated into a multipurpose event and exhibit space in 2015. The LAA headquarters underwent further renovations in 2018, when the panels were removed from the facade, restoring the exterior to its original design. When plans to expand the neighboring New York Penn Station were announced in the early 2020s, the LAA sought to have its clubhouse protected as a landmark to prevent it from being redeveloped and demolished. The building was added to the National Register of Historic Places in 2022, and it became a New York City designated landmark in 2026.

== Building ==
The Lithuanian Alliance of America clubhouse, seen in September 2026

The clubhouse of the LAA is at 307 West 30th Street, just south of the James A. Farley Building (Moynihan Train Hall) in the Chelsea neighborhood of Manhattan, New York City, New York, U.S. The building, a converted rowhouse, was the LAA's headquarters and hosted various events and activities, and also provided advice and assistance to the Lithuanian diaspora in the U.S. Built by Edward E. Ashley and dating from c. 1876, the residence is designed in the Neo-Grec style and is four stories high. It was originally used as a rental apartment building; before the LAA bought the house, the occupants had included several relatively well-off tenants and some immigrant families.

The primary elevation of this building's facade is divided vertically into three bays and is made of brick. There is masonry trim around the door and window openings, as well as brownstone windowsills and lintels. A stoop with three steps ascends to an entrance with a metal-and-glass door surrounded by sharp, angular design elements. There is also an areaway in front of the house, where a stair descends to a basement doorway with a cast-iron lintel; next to this door is a storefront window. The upper stories have double-hung aluminum-framed windows with incised stone lintels, while the top of the building has an angular cornice made of sheet metal. The eastern elevation is visible from the street and originally abutted a three-story building, whose outline is visible in the brickwork; there are two chimneys. The rear elevation is made of stucco with bluestone window details and an iron fire escape. The concrete-paved rear yard is surrounded by a wood fence and concrete masonry unit wall. The western elevation is partially visible as well.

The building was originally a single-family home with a first-floor parlor and upper-floor bedrooms. It was subdivided into a four-unit tenement building by 1902, with each unit's rooms arranged linearly in a railroad apartment layout. Upon the LAA's acquisition, the organization put the printing press in the basement; a reception room on the first floor; private offices on the 2nd floor; and apartments on the 3rd and 4th floors. The 1st-floor rooms have been combined since 1976. The 3rd and 4th floors have seen a variety of uses over the years, and they have been modified with such decorations as partitions and gypsum board ceilings.

== Operation ==
The Lithuanian Alliance of America has been designated as a 501(c)(8) fraternal beneficiary society since March 1972. The LAA hosts cultural events for the Lithuanian-American community. These include performing arts, exhibits, and concerts. The SLA 307 gallery displays Lithuanian art on the 30th Street building's ground level. In addition, the headquarters hosts speeches and other events featuring visiting officials and dignitaries from Lithuania.

The LAA building also hosts the LAA's archives, including photographs and membership records. Local Lithuanian Americans have described the clubhouse as "perhaps the largest archive of our ancestors". In addition to publishing Tėvynė (see § Tėvynė), the LAA published a periodical called Ataskaita ("The Report"), with 32 issues between 1901 and 1910.

=== Tėvynė ===
The LAA publishes the newspaper Tėvynė ("Fatherland"), which was, for several decades, published at the LAA building in Manhattan. Established in January 1896 and distributed free of charge, Tėvynė provided news and commentary, particularly relating to Lithuanian culture and the Lithuanian diaspora around the world. Lithuania's "Patriarch of the Nation" Jonas Basanavičius, along with poet Adam Mickevičius, were among those whose works were published in Tėvynė. Although originally published as a monthly periodical, with 32 pages per issue, Tėvynė became a weekly publication in 1900. It briefly ceased operation c. 1901–1902 and resumed publication in 1908 as a weekly, printing out of Boston.

Tėvynė moved to the Manhattan building likely in 1910, when that building was acquired. The printing press was in the basement, while the offices were on the Manhattan building's 4th floor. Tėvynė published a women's and children's supplement from 1917 to 1919. With the outbreak of Spanish flu and World War I, in 1918, Tėvynė began publishing a health and medical advice column, and it was exempted from a requirement that U.S. government monitors examine English translations of its content. Each issue was reduced to four pages in 1920 before returning to eight in 1922, at which point it was the U.S.'s highest-circulating Lithuanian-language periodical. During World War II, the issues were cut back to six and then four pages, and a subscription fee was introduced; the issue size was increased back to six pages after the war.

Linotype machines were used to print Tėvynė from its founding until 1969, when increased costs and the death of its last skilled linotypist prompted the introduction of photo-offset printing. Around that time, Tėvynė began printing in English as well as Lithuanian. The publication's printing press moved out of the LAA building in 1971, after a burglary forced it to move to Brooklyn. Tėvynė decreased its publication frequency to once every two weeks in 1972, and publication temporarily ceased entirely later that year. The LAA removed the printing press as part of the clubhouse's 1970s renovation. Tėvynė again halted publication in 2001; it resumed in 2006 in Chicago. By the 21st century, Tėvynė was an online newspaper.

== See also ==
- List of New York City Designated Landmarks in Manhattan from 14th to 59th Streets
- National Register of Historic Places listings in Manhattan from 14th to 59th Streets

== Sources ==
- Lithuanian Alliance Building (PDF) (Report). New York City Landmarks Preservation Commission. 2026-04-04.
- Lithuanian Alliance of America (Report). National Register of Historic Places, National Park Service. 2022-09-05. Report hosted on cris.parks.ny.gov (On "Search" tab: Criteria → Lookup → National Register number: 21NR00038 → NR Nomination Form).
- Širvydas, Vytautas; Diržys, Antanas; Budreckis, Algirdas M. (1976). History of the Lithuanian Alliance and its Condensation in English. Lithuanian Alliance of America.
- Tamošiūnas, Julius (1991). Lietuviškų periodinių leidinių bibliografija 1832–1982 [Bibliography of Lithuanian periodicals 1832–1982] (in Lithuanian). Kaunas: Julius Tamošiūnas. OCLC 35388671.
