= Vincas Mykolaitis-Putinas =

Lithuanian author (1893–1967)

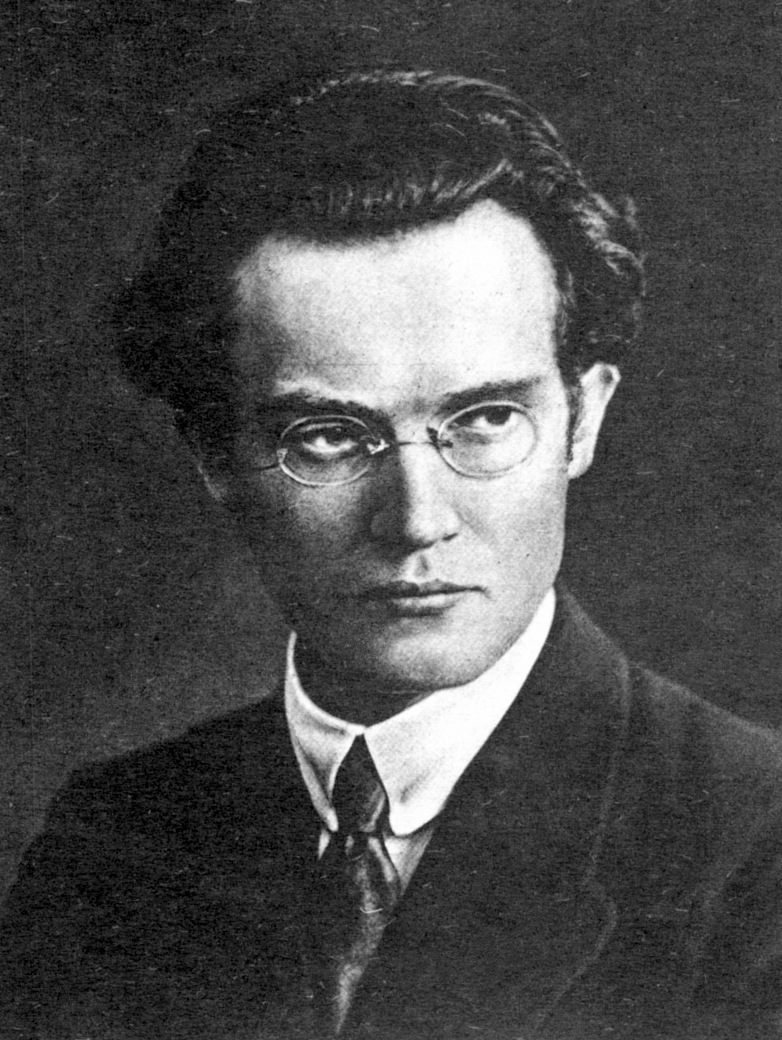
- Born: 6 January 1893; Pilotiškės, Suwałki Governorate, Russian Empire
- Died: 7 June 1967 (aged 74); Kačerginė, Lithuanian SSR
- Resting place: Rasos Cemetery
- Education: Sejny Priest Seminary; Saint Petersburg Roman Catholic Theological Academy; University of Fribourg
- Occupations: Poet, dramatist, literary critic, translator
- Years active: 1911–1967
- Spouse: Emilija Kvederaitė

Vincas Mykolaitis, known by his pen name Putinas (literally Viburnum); 6 January 1893 – 7 June 1967), was a Lithuanian writer, poet and translator, accorded the honour of being a People's Writer of the Lithuanian SSR in 1963. He was also a Catholic priest, but renounced his priesthood in 1935.

== Biography ==
In 1909, Mykolaitis enrolled to the Sejny Priest Seminary, after few years he published his first poem. In 1915, he was ordained as a priest, however he questioned his mission as a priest. Later he continued studies at the Saint Petersburg Roman Catholic Theological Academy. In Saint Petersburg, Mykolaitis published his first collection of poems in 1917. After Saint Petersburg, Mykolaitis continued his studies at the University of Fribourg, Switzerland, and received doctoral degree in 1922.

After studies in western Europe, Mykolaitis settled in Lithuania, teaching at the University of Lithuania. During his stay in France, Mykolaitis started to work on his most famous novel — Altorių šešėly (In the Shadow of the Altars). The 3-part novel was published in 1933 and caused a scandal in Lithuania as it described a priest doubting and eventually renouncing his calling. In 1935, Mykolaitis renounced his priesthood. In 1940, he started to work at Vilnius University, there he became professor.

Other notable works of Mykolaitis were novel Sukilėliai (Rebels; unfinished) and Tarp dviejų aušrų (Between Two Dawns).

Mykolaitis died in 1967 in Kačerginė near Kaunas and was buried in Rasos Cemetery, Vilnius.

== Commemoration ==
There is Putinas's house museum in his birth home in the village of Pilotiškės.

In 2002, a memorial museum of Putinas was opened at Rygiškių Jonas Gymnasium in Marijampolė.
