= Julija Pranaitytė =

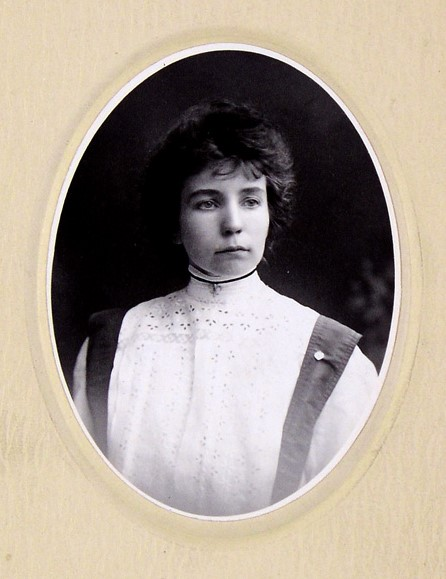
- Pranaitytė around 1896
- Born: 26 June 1881; Panenupiai, Suwałki Governorate, Congress Poland
- Died: 29 January 1944 (aged 62); Philadelphia, United States
- Other names: Pranaičių Julė; Julė Pranaičiūtė
- Occupations: Magazine editor, book publisher
- Relatives: Brother Justinas Pranaitis

Julija "Julė" Pranaitytė (26 June 1881 – 29 January 1944) was a Lithuanian newspaper editor, book publisher, and traveler in the Russian Empire and later United States of America.

She was educated in Saint Petersburg (Russia), La Chapelle-Montligeon (France), and Ingenbohl (Switzerland). After the death of her fiancé, poet Pranas Vaičaitis, in 1901, she moved to the United States where she collaborated with the priest Antanas Milukas and edited the Catholic magazine Žvaigždė until her death. Using her personal funds, she published about 35 Lithuanian books. Together with Milukas, she published about a hundred books. She translated religious texts from French and wrote travel books on her journeys to Uzbekistan, Turkmenistan, Caucasus (published in 1914), Lithuania (1928), and Spain (1932). She died in poverty and obscurity in 1944.

== Biography ==
=== Early life and education ===
Pranaitytė was the 8th child in a family of well-off Lithuanian farmers in the Panenupiai village near Griškabūdis, Suwałki Governorate, Congress Poland. After attending a local primary school, her elder brother priest Justinas Pranaitis took her with him to Saint Petersburg to attend the girls' gymnasium attached to the Catholic Church of St. Catherine. She sang at the church choir, directed by Lithuanian Česlovas Sasnauskas. In summer 1896, Pranaitytė met Pranas Vaičaitis at the home of her brother-in-law Saliamonas Banaitis. At the time, Vaičaitis was a law student at the Saint Petersburg University and they developed a close friendship that culminated in their engagement.

Upon graduation in 1896, Pranaitytė attended a school in La Chapelle-Montligeon that, upon graduation, granted the right to teach French in schools. In France, she started contributing to Lithuanian press – she wrote articles for Varpas, Tėvynės sargas, Vienybė Lietuvninkų. She also published nine issues of a religious bulletin translated from French. In 1901, during her summer vacation, she cared for her terminally ill fiancé Vaičaitis who had returned to his native Santakai near Sintautai. Despite her efforts, Vaičaitis died of tuberculosis on 21 September 1901. It was a severe emotional loss for Pranaitytė and she remained unmarried.

=== In the United States ===
==== Publisher and editor ====
Encouraged by her brother, Pranaitytė continued her French studies at Ingenbohl, Switzerland, where she met priest Antanas Milukas, studying canon law at the University of Fribourg. Their friendship and collaboration continued for the rest of their lives. Milukas, active in the Lithuanian American press, invited Pranaitytė to move to the United States. Towards the end of 1902, she arrived to Shenandoah, Pennsylvania, a coal mining town with a large Lithuanian population.

There she was employed by Milukas as editor of the Catholic magazine Žvaigždė (Star). She also edited various books published by Žvaigždė Press and personally financed about thirty books, including a poetry collection of Pranas Vaičaitis (1903), a biography of priest Motiejus Gustaitis (1915), as well as works of bishop Motiejus Valančius (1925). In addition, she translated French religious books into Lithuanian, often pseudonymously as Pranaičių Julė. In 1909, she moved to Philadelphia where she attempted to study medicine at the University of Pennsylvania.

==== Traveler ====
Pranaitytė visited Lithuania three times. In 1911, she visited the grave of Vaičaitis and persuaded his brother Jonas to name his newborn son Pranas in Vaičaitis' honor and memory. From there, she traveled to Tashkent where her brother Justinas Pranaitis worked as a missionary. She also visited Samarkand, Bukhara, Merv, Krasnovodsk, Baku, Tbilisi, traveled via the Georgian Military Road to Vladikavkaz. She published a 370-page book on the journey in 1914. It was the first travel memoir by a Lithuanian woman.

She visited Lithuania again in 1923. A surviving photograph shows her and professor Eduards Volters, who supported Vaičaitis during his university studies, standing by the grave of Vaičaitis. She toured Lithuania, including the seaside, and again published her two-volume travel memoirs in 1928.

She returned to Lithuania again in 1932 to an official reception to honor Milukas' 40-year and her 30-year work for the Lithuanian press. The reception featured speeches by Adomas Dambrauskas-Jakštas, Juozas Tumas-Vaižgantas, Kazys Bizauskas, Jonas Vileišis, and others. She wrote and published Milukas' biography in 1931. Before visiting Lithuania, Pranaitytė traveled to Spain and published a travel book in 1932.

==== Later life and death ====
Pranaitytė continued to edit Žvaigždė and publish books, but it was not a profitable activity and she suffered severe financial hardship. In 1938, the Lithuanian government allotted her a special monthly pension of 250 litas. However, it stopped after the occupation of Lithuania by the Soviet Union in June 1940. After Milukas' death in 1943, she inherited his archive, but it was lost after her death on 29 January 1944. Due to financial difficulties, she was buried in an unmarked grave in one of the cemeteries of Philadelphia.
