= Antanas Milukas =

Lithuanian Roman Catholic priest, book publisher, and newspaper editor

- Born: 13 June 1871; Šeštokai, Congress Poland
- Died: 19 March 1943 (aged 71); Brooklyn, New York
- Education: Sejny Priest Seminary; St. Charles Borromeo Seminary
- Occupations: Priest, book publisher, newspaper editor

Antanas Milukas (13 June 1871 – 19 March 1943) was a Lithuanian Roman Catholic priest, book publisher, and newspaper editor working among the Lithuanian Americans.

As a student at the Sejny Priest Seminary, he was involved in the publication and distribution of illegal Lithuanian publications. He was searched by the Tsarist police for violating the Lithuanian press ban and fled to the United States where he completed his education at the St. Charles Borromeo Seminary. Ordained a priest in 1896, Milukas was a parson in various Lithuanian parishes in Pennsylvania and New York. In addition to his pastoral duties, Milukas was a member and co-founder of numerous Lithuanian American organizations and societies as well as a prolific Lithuanian-language book publisher and newspaper editor. Together with Julija Pranaitytė, Milukas published some 190 Lithuanian books. These included three-volume photo album compiled by Milukas and exhibited at the World's Fair in Paris, history of Lithuania translated into English by Milukas and distributed to diplomats at the Paris Peace Conference, 1919, and four-volume history of the Lithuanian Americans written by Milukas. He established and edited the quarterly cultural magazine Dirva (1898–1906) and edited the Catholic Žvaigždė for forty years (1903–1943). He assisted in editing Varpas (1891–1892) and Tėvynės sargas and Žinyčia (1901–1902).

== Biography ==
Milukas was born in Šeštokai, Suwałki Governorate, Congress Poland. After graduating from a primary school in Rudamina and the Gymnasium in Marijampolė, he enrolled at the Sejny Priest Seminary in 1899. At the seminary, he was an active participant in the Lithuanian National Revival. He organized a handwritten Lithuanian-language weekly newsletter, initially known as Knapt. It grew from 8 pages to 24 pages and changed titles to Visko po biskį (A Little About Everything) and Viltis (Hope). He contributed articles to the banned Lithuanian press, including Varpas and Ūkininkas, and was involved in its smuggling and distribution. In 1891, he was expelled from the seminary when prohibited publications were found in his dormitory. He was also searched by the police in connection with the Sietynas case.

To avoid the police, he fled to Tilsit in East Prussia (present-day Sovetsk, Kaliningrad Oblast) where for a few months he helped to edit and publish Varpas. With financial assistance from priest Aleksandras Burba, Milukas arrived to Plymouth, Pennsylvania, where he took over the editorial duties of Vienybė Lietuvninkų. After a year, in 1893, he enrolled at the St. Charles Borromeo Seminary to finish his studies. Upon graduation, he was ordained a priest on 30 May 1896 by Archbishop Patrick John Ryan. He was assigned to the Lithuanian parish of St. George in Shenandoah, Pennsylvania. In 1901–1902, he studied canon law at the University of Fribourg in Switzerland. There he met Julija Pranaitytė and invited her to the United States starting their life-long collaboration on Lithuanian publications. In Fribourg, he also learned about the Sisters of Saint Paul, a women's congregation that worked on publishing and distributing Catholic press, and brought the idea to the United States and prompted Maria Kaupas to establish the Sisters of Saint Casimir in 1907.

Upon his return to the United States, he was appointed to a Lithuanian parish in Brooklyn, New York. He worked at the Church of St. Mary of the Angels, a former Methodist church located at the end of the Williamsburg Bridge. In 1907, he organized the Lithuanian parish in Girardville and Gilberton, Pennsylvania. He was the parson of Lithuanian parishes in Philadelphia at the Church of St. George (1909–1914) and in Maspeth, Queens at the Transfiguration Roman Catholic Church (1914–1933). The Maspeth church burned down twice, in 1919 and 1925. First, Milukas rebuilt the church, but the second time he moved it to the former St. Stanislaus Kostka Roman Catholic Church. In 1931, the Lithuanian government awarded Milukas the Order of Vytautas the Great (3rd class) in recognition of his dedication to Lithuanian causes and on the occasion of the 40th anniversary of his public work and his 60th birthday. He later was a chaplain at the St. Catherine's Hospital in Brooklyn and at the St. Francis Sanatorium for Cardiac Children in Roslyn, New York. He died in Brooklyn on 19 March 1943.

== Activities ==
=== Societies and organizations ===
Milukas was active in the Lithuanian American public life, becoming co-founder and member of numerous societies and devoting his time to Lithuanian publications. He organized the Bishop Motiejus Valančius Library Society (Lithuanian: Vyskupo Motiejaus Valančiausko skaitinyčios draugystė), which published 10,000 copies of his book on how to learn to write in Tilsit in 1893. In 1894, he was a co-founder of the Society of Laurynas Ivinskis which organized the Lithuanian exhibition at the World's Fair in Paris in 1900. Milukas created a poster showing the difficult cultural and educational conditions in Lithuania and exhibited his three-volume Lietuviškas albumas, a photo album with explanatory text in Lithuanian and English, which was awarded a gold medal at the fair. In 1900, he co-founded the Motinėlė Society, which provided financial aid to Lithuanian students.

In 1907, he was elected as the "spiritual leader" of the Lithuanian Roman Catholic Union of America (Lithuanian: Lietuvių Romos katalikų susivienijimas Amerikoje) and claimed that he outranked the chairman of the union. 23 priests signed a protest letter against such claims and forced Milukas to resign in 1909. The conflict pushed Milukas out of the Catholic leadership into the margins of Lithuanian American cultural life. During World War I, Milukas and other Lithuanians petitioned President Woodrow Wilson to proclaim the Lithuanian Day when all across United States donations would be collected for the benefit of Lithuanian war refugees. On 1 November 1916, Lithuanians collected $176,863 (equivalent to $5,232,873 in 2025). After the Żeligowski's Mutiny in 1920, Milukas established a charitable society for the Relief for the Little Martyrs of Vilnius to support Lithuanian orphans and schools in Vilnius Region and published about the Polish government's repression of Lithuanians.

=== Publications ===
Together with Julija Pranaitytė, Milukas published some 190 Lithuanian books. The books included folk tales collected by Jonas Basanavičius, epistolary novel Viktutė by Marija Pečkauskaitė (Šatrijos Ragana), poetry of Pranas Vaičaitis, works by Kristijonas Donelaitis, Vincas Pietaris, Antanas Baranauskas, Antanas Strazdas, Motiejus Valančius. He translated and published The History of the Lithuanian Nation and Its Present National Aspirations based on articles originally published in Žvaigždė by Antanas Jusaitis. The book was gifted to President Woodrow Wilson and other diplomats during the Paris Peace Conference, 1919. It was a popular book and required a second edition within three months. This edition included a facsimile of a thank-you letter from President Wilson. Milukas wrote and published two major books on the Lithuanian Americans, two-volume Pirmieji Amerikos lietuvių profesijonalai ir kronika (The First Lithuanian Professionals in United States and Chronicle, 1929–1931) and Amerikos lietuviai XIX šimtmetyje (Lithuanian Americans in the 19th Century, 1938–1942). In total, the circulation of Milukas' books exceeded 500,000 copies, but it was not a profitable activity and Milukas died in poverty.

Milukas edited various Lithuanian newspapers, including Vienybė Lietuvninkų (1892–1893) and Garsas Amerikos lietuvių (1897–1898). In 1898, he established the quarterly cultural magazine Dirva and edited it until it ceased publication in 1906. While studying in Switzerland, he assisted Juozas Tumas-Vaižgantas with editing Tėvynės sargas and Žinyčia. When Tumas could no longer edit Žinyčia, Milukas merged the magazine with Dirva. In 1903, he purchased Žvaigždė published in Brooklyn and edited it until his death. Initially, it was a weekly, but became a monthly in 1923 and quarterly in 1926. Until 1909, it was the official periodical of the Lithuanian Roman Catholic Union of America.

== Sources ==
- Merkys, Vytautas (1994). Knygnešių laikai 1864–1904 (in Lithuanian). Vilnius: Valstybinis leidybos centras. pp. 271, 286. ISBN 9986-09-018-0.
- Misiūnas, Remigijus (2004). Informacinių kovų kryžkelėse: JAV lietuvių informacinės kovos XIX a. pabaigoje – 1922 m. (PDF) (in Lithuanian). Vilnius: Versus Aurius. ISBN 9955-601-39-6. Archived from the original (PDF) on 2018-04-14.
- Prendergast, Edmond (1917). The Philadelphia Theological Seminary of St. Charles Borromeo: A Record of Its Foundation, Charter, and Career, Comprising a List of the Trustees, Members of the Faculty and of the Priests Therein Ordained, 1832-1917. Catholic Standard and Times Pub. Co. OCLC 977840843.
- Riordan, Michael J. (1914). The Catholic Church in the United States of America. Vol. III: The Province of Baltimore and The Province of New York, Section I. New York: Catholic Editing Company. OCLC 956654650.
- Tamošiūnas, Julius (1991). Lietuviškų periodinių leidinių bibliografija (in Lithuanian). Vol. I. Kaunas: J. Tamošiūnas. OCLC 35388671.
- Wolkovich-Valkavičius, William L. (Summer 1994). "Immigrants Who Become Lithuanian by Becoming American". Lituanus. 2 (40). ISSN 0024-5089. Archived from the original on 2017-05-19.

=== Lithuanian encyclopedias ===
- Račis, Antanas, ed. (2009). "Antanas Milukas". Visuotinė lietuvių enciklopedija (in Lithuanian). Vol. XV (Mezas-Nagurskiai). Vilnius: Mokslo ir enciklopedijų leidybos institutas. p. 148.
- Raguotis, Bronius (1997). "Dirva" (PDF). In Tapinas, Laimonas (ed.). Žurnalistikos enciklopedija (in Lithuanian). Vilnius: Pradai. p. 106. ISBN 9986-776-62-7.
- Sužiedėlis, Simas, ed. (1978). "Žinyčia". Encyclopedia Lituanica (in Lithuanian). Vol. VI. Boston, Massachusetts: Juozas Kapočius. pp. 336–337. OCLC 174676519.

=== Lithuanian journals ===
- Misiūnas, Remigijus (2005). "Kitakalbė lietuvių išeivių leidyba JAV iki 1922 metų". Knygotyra (in Lithuanian). 45 (86). ISSN 0204-2061.
- Skirius, Juozas (2011). "Lietuvos ordinų ir medalių teikimo JAV lietuviams politika 1927–1940 metais". Istorija. Mokslo darbai (in Lithuanian). 83. ISSN 1392-0456.

==== Aidai ====
- Kučas, Antanas (September 1960). "Kelias į lietuvių mokyklas Amerikoje". Aidai (in Lithuanian). 7 (132). ISSN 0002-208X.
- Kučas, Antanas (October 1962). "Amerikos lietuvių spaudos pionierius". Aidai (in Lithuanian). 8 (153). ISSN 0002-208X.

==== XXI amžius ====
- Krikštaponis, Vilmantas (15 June 2011a). "Degęs Dievo ir Tėvynės meile. Kun. Antano Miluko 140-osioms gimimo metinėms". XXI amžius (in Lithuanian). 45 (1925). ISSN 2029-1299.
- Krikštaponis, Vilmantas (13 July 2011b). "Primiršta lietuviškos spaudos darbuotoja. Julijos Pranaitytės 130-osioms gimimo metinėms". XXI amžius (in Lithuanian). 52 (1932). ISSN 2029-1299.

=== Websites ===
- Calise, Joseph P. (2015). "History of Transfiguration". Parishes of Transfiguration and Saint Stanislaus Kostka. Archived from the original on 26 July 2015.
- McNamara, Pat (March 19, 2009). "Apostle of the Lithuanians". Patheos.
- Petrauskienė, Virginija (19 January 2018). "Lietuvos 100-mečiui – unikali paroda Balzeko muziejuje". Amerikos lietuvis (in Lithuanian). Archived from the original on 31 March 2018.
