= Žinyčia =

Žinyčia (literally: temple of pagan Lithuanians or treasury of knowledge) was the first Lithuanian-language cultural magazine targeting Lithuania proper. Established in 1900 by priest Juozas Tumas-Vaižgantas, it targeted members of the Catholic intelligentsia. Due to the Lithuanian press ban, it had to be printed in Tilsit, East Prussia (present-day Sovetsk, Kaliningrad Oblast) and smuggled into Lithuania. The circulation was 500 copies. Due to its limited audience, the magazine could not financially support itself and after five issues was merged with Dirva, published in United States.

== History ==
Lithuanian clergy began publishing Catholic-minded newspaper Tėvynės sargas in January 1896. From December 1897 to May 1902, it was edited by Juozas Tumas-Vaižgantas. Tėvynės sargas was geared towards the uneducated villagers and Tumas yearned for a magazine for the intelligentsia. He understood that the magazine would not be able to support itself financially and solicited donations. He obtained 885 rubles from Jonas Balvočius, dean of Vadokliai. The plan was to publish four issues a year, but due to financial difficulties the issues were irregular. Two issues (155 and 96 pages) were published in 1900, one issue (99 pages) in 1901, and one double issue (127 pages) in 1902. For government purposes, the magazine needed to identify an editor who was a resident of East Prussia. Such official editor of Žinyčia was Prussian Lithuanian Jurgis Lapinas.

Tumas, reassigned from Kuliai to Micaičiai near Kuršėnai in July 1901 and to Vadaktėliai near Naujamiestis in May 1902, could no longer edit either Tėvynės sargas or Žinyčia. In 1903, priest Antanas Milukas merged Žinyčia with Dirva, published in Shenandoah, Pennsylvania, since 1898. The combined quarterly magazine was known as Dirva-Žinynas. Eight issues appeared before the joint publication was discontinued in 1904. The stand-alone Dirva continued to be published until 1906.

== Content ==
Žinyčia was a cultural, not political magazine. In his opening letter, Tumas invited intellectuals of all political views to contribute. Tumas published translated works of bishop Motiejus Valančius and an article for the 100th anniversary of his birth. He also published a resume of a work by Princeton professor John Grier Hibben on self-identity (ego). The magazine devoted substantial attention to the issues of Lithuanian language, including grammar and spelling. Other articles analyzed the history of Lithuania, including an article by Jonas Basanavičius in which he presented his hypothesis that Lithuanians were descendants of Thracians and Phrygians. Vincas Pietaris (pen name Savasis) published a review of Basanavičius' and Jonas Žilius' theories of Lithuanians' origins (issue 4–5, pages 1–8). Adomas Jakštas contributed several articles, including on Latin books published in the former Grand Duchy of Lithuania and on Bible translations into Lithuanian. Kazimieras Macius (pen name Samogita) published a lengthy study on the Lithuanian folk songs, Pranciškus Būčys (signed P.B.) wrote a short article on what civilization is, Jurgis Šaulys (pen name Mažagetas) raised the issue of the national anthem and proposed Kur bėga Šešupė, kur Nemunas teka by Maironis (issue 4–5, pages 51–52). The magazine also published reviews of Lithuanian books and publications and literary works – poetry by Juozas Šnapštys (pen name Margalis), Mikalojus Šeižys (pen name Dagilėlis), short stories by Kazimieras Pakalniškis (pen name Dėdė Atanazas), Marija Pečkauskaitė (pen name Šatrijos Ragana).
