= Pranaitis =

- Lithuanian surname
- m.: Pranaitis
- f.: (unmarried): Pranaitytė
- f.: (married): Pranaitienė
- f.: (short): Pranaitė

Pranaitis is a Lithuanian surname. Notable people with the surname include:

- Julija Pranaitytė (26 June 1881 – 29 January 1944) was a Lithuanian newspaper editor, book publisher, and traveler
- Justinas Pranaitis (1861-1917), Lithuanian Catholic priest, professor of Hebrew
- Salomėja Pranaitienė (born 1955), Lithuanian radio and television journalist and editor
