= Žvaigždutė =

Žvaigždutė (transl. Little Star) is the name of three Lithuanian magazines for children:

- Žvaigždutė (Kaunas) published in 1923–1940 in Kaunas
- Žvaigždutė (1950–1957) published in 1950–1957 in Vilnius
- Žvaigždutė (1971–2023) published in 1971–2023 in Vilnius
