= Sintautai Eldership =

Eldership of Lithuania

Sintautai Eldership Sintautų seniūnija
- Eldership
- Location of Sintautai Eldership in Lithuania
- Coordinates: 54°52′40″N 22°59′40″E
- Country: Lithuania
- County: Marijampolė County
- Municipality: Šakiai District Municipality
- Seat: Sintautai

Area
  - Total: 95 km^{2} (37 sq mi)

Population (2021 census)
  - Total: 1,329
  - Density: 14/km^{2} (36/sq mi)
- Time zone: UTC+2 (EET)
  - Summer (DST): UTC+3 (EEST)
- Postal code: LT-71336

The Sintautai Eldership (Lithuanian: Sintautų seniūnija) is an eldership of Lithuania, located in the Šakiai District Municipality. In 2021 its population was 1329.
