= Lithuanian Catholic Temperance Society =

Coordinates: 54°53′54″N 23°53′34″E

The Lithuanian Catholic Temperance Society (Lithuanian: Lietuvių katalikų blaivybės draugija or LKBD) was a temperance society active in 1908–1915 and 1919–1940 in Lithuania.

Established by the Lithuanian clergy after the Russian Revolution of 1905, LKBD quickly grew to 212 chapters and about 60,000 members becoming the largest Catholic organization in Lithuania. However, its activities were interrupted by World War I. It was reestablished in 1919 and became active in 1921. In 1926, LKBD had about 22,500 members. Its youth section was spun off as independent organization Angelaičiai for children under the age of 15. Angelačiai had about 60,000 members in 1933. Both organizations were closed after the Soviet occupation of Lithuania in June 1940.

LKBD organized various events, including temperance weeks in January and June, lectures, congresses, mock trials, theater performances, etc. It published periodicals Sargyba and Žvaigždutė as well as more than a hundred books and brochures. LKBD cooperated with various other Catholic organizations and helped them organizing their own temperance sections or committees. Its activities diminished in the 1930s when it lost most of government funding.

== History ==
Lithuanians were allowed to organize their own societies after the Russian Revolution of 1905. A group of Lithuanian priests registered LKBD on 3 April 1908 in Kovno Governorate though it could operate in all Lithuanian-inhabited governorates (Kovno, Vilna, Suwałki, and Courland). The temporary board was elected on 28 April 1908 (chaired by the auxiliary bishop Gasparas Cirtautas). Until 1911, board members had to be confirmed by the Bishop of Samogitia.

The society was closed due to World War I in 1915. After the war, LKBD was officially reestablished on 10 December 1919 in Kaunas, but became active in 1921. Its activities diminished in 1930s after it lost majority of government funding. The society was liquidated after the Soviet occupation of Lithuania in June 1940.

== Activities ==
=== Pre-war ===
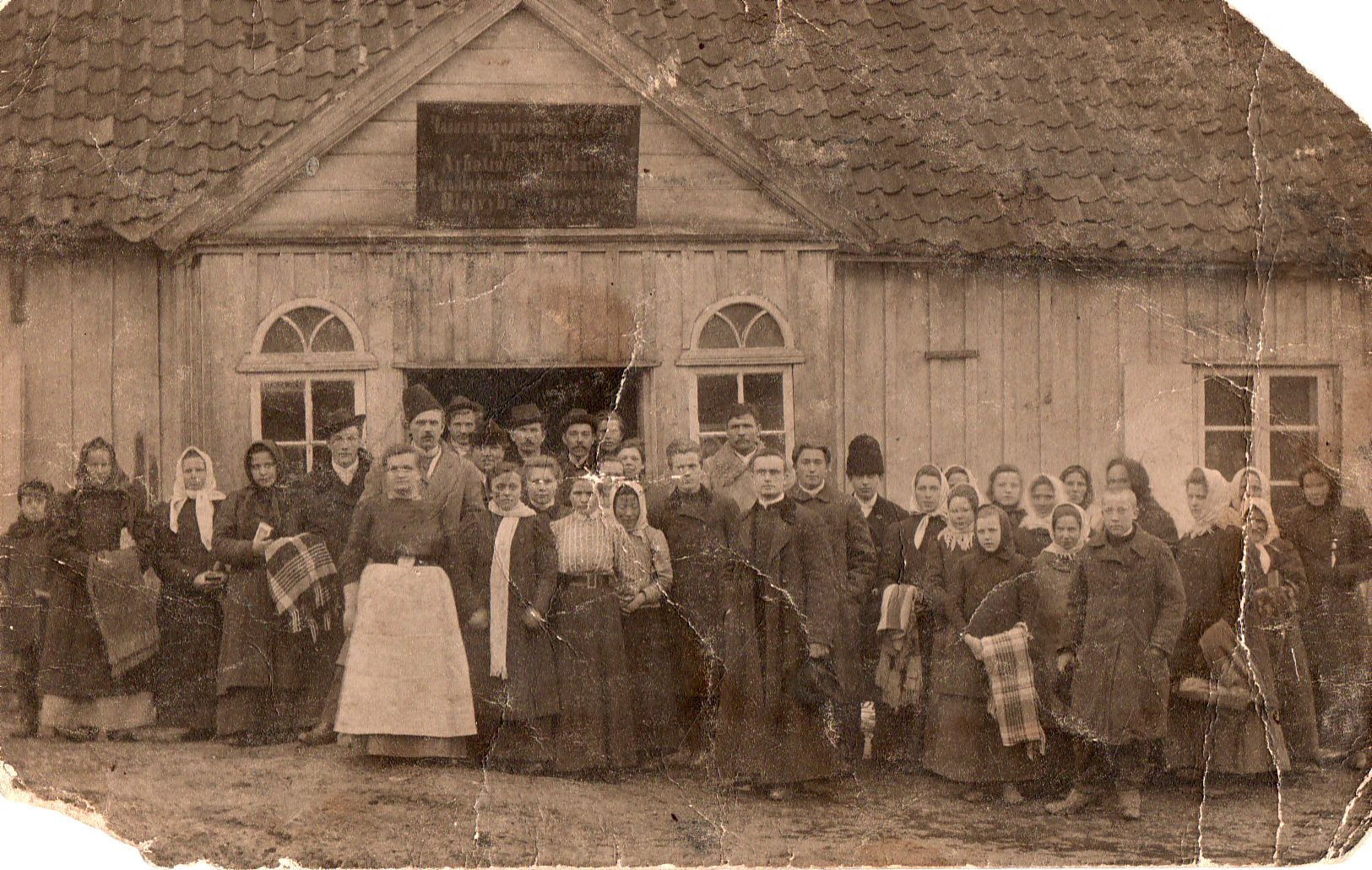
Society's tea house in Raguva

LKBD organized local chapters that organized various events and establishments. For example, chapters frequently organized teahouses as an alternative to inns and bars. However, the Tsarist government was reluctant to issue various permits. It is estimated that about 30 establishments could not be opened due to bureaucratic difficulties. Vast majority of the local chapters were led by a local priest. Historian Jonas Matusas counted just seven chapters led by laypeople. The largest local chapters were in Marijampolė (1,763 members), Subačius (1,301 members), and Svėdasai (1,043 members). Reportedly, under the leadership of Juozas Laukaitis, the chapter in Leipalingis grew to 1,350 members.

The society became more active and began to grow under the leadership of chairman Kazimieras Marma (he was replaced by Jurgis Galdikas when his reelection was not approved by the Kovno governor in 1914). In 1913, LKBD had 191 chapters with 49,068 members that maintained 72 teahouses, 20 libraries, 3 shelters for the poor, 26 choirs, 2 orchestras. In 1910, LKBD had six bakeries. During 1913, LKBD organized 60 amateur theater performances and concerts and 15 celebrations of gegužinė (Lithuanian version of May Day). It also published 258,985 copies of various publications. In 1914, LKBD grew to 212 chapters and about 60,000 members becoming the largest Catholic organization in Lithuania.

Members of LKBD attended international temperance congresses, including the First All-Russian Temperance Congress in December 1909 (LKBD sent five representatives, including Fabijonas Kemėšis), international congress in Hague in August–September 1911, and the 14th International Congress on Alcoholism in Milan in September 1913. LKBD participated in exhibitions, including the All-Russian Hygiene Exhibition of 1913 in Saint Petersburg.

=== Interwar ===
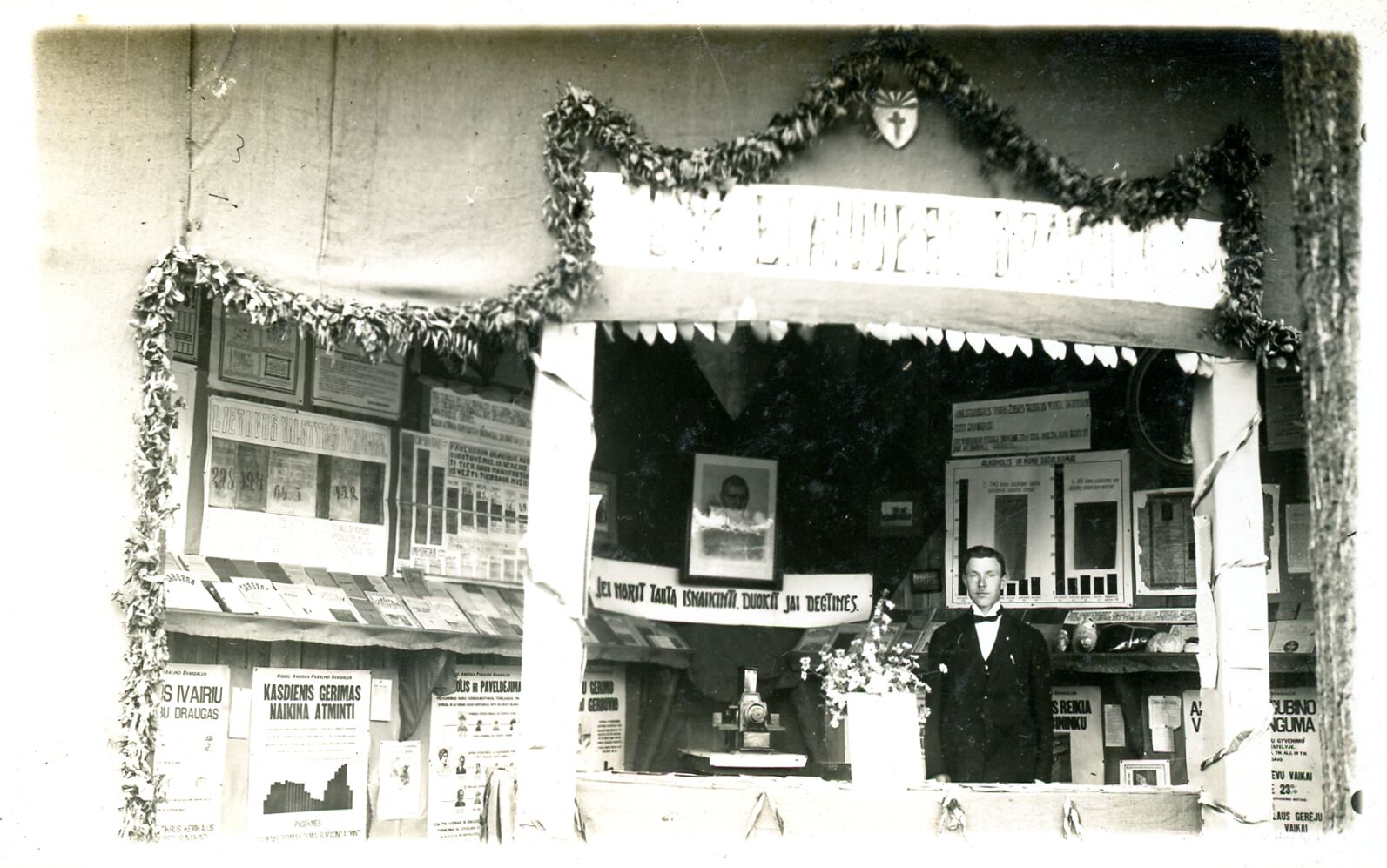
Display of LKBD at an exhibition in 1925

==== Events ====
Joseph Ehret initiated temperance weeks which were organized twice a year, in January and June. They became popular and grew to involve schools, military, Lithuanian Riflemen's Union, etc.

LKBD organized various public lectures (more than 500 lectures were given between September 1922 and September 1923) and courses (for example, two-day courses in Ukmergė attended by 233 people in 1925). It also organized anti-alcohol congresses; the largest conferences were First Congress on the Education of Sober Youth in January 1931 and the First Antialcohol Congress in December 1933 (75th anniversary of the temperance movement started by bishop Motiejus Valančius). The congress in 1933 was accompanied by an antialcohol exhibition which devoted significant attention to fruit juices and healthy, accessible nutrition, including a demonstration on how to organize a party without alcohol. The exhibition was visited by about 10,000 people.

LKBD organized other events, such as mock public trials and demonstrations. It organized annual conferences to report on its activities and discuss future plans.

==== Relations with the government ====
LKBD had ambitions to implement full prohibition in Lithuania. Article 101 of the 1922 Constitution of Lithuania allowed each district (valsčius) to vote whether to allow local establishments to sell alcohol. LKBD helped organizing such local referendums and by 1926 there were 13 dry districts. In 1920, LKBD resolved to adopt the Gothenburg Public House System, but there was a lack of experienced businessmen supporting the idea and it was abandoned by 1924.

LKBD was supported by the Lithuanian Christian Democratic Party which had the majority in the Second Seimas. LKBD received substantial sums from the government (about 100,000 litas per year in 1923–1924). Government's support gradually decreased after the December 1926 coup d'état and was just 15,000 litas in 1932. LKBD had other sources of revenue, including membership fees, donations, fundraisers (e.g. lotteries), support from other organizations, revenue from tea houses, etc. However, without government's support, LKBD began struggling and its activities diminished.

==== Relations with other organizations ====
In its temperance mission, the society was supported by other Catholic organizations, including youth associations Ateitis and Pavasaris as well as the Lithuanian Catholic Women's Organization. These and other Catholic organizations belonged to the Catholic Action Center, an umbrella organization. In 1922, LKBD began organizing temperance sections inside these organizations. In 1924, LKBD and other temperance-minded organizations established the Temperance Council of Lithuania (Lietuvos blaivybės taryba), an umbrella organization, but it was short-lived.

In 1937, physician Juozas Bagdonas established the Lithuanian Temperance Union (Lietuvos blaivinimo sąjunga), which was supported by the president Antanas Smetona and did not cooperate with LKBD.

LKBD maintained contacts with organizations in about ten countries, including the International Bureau for Combating Alcoholism (Internationale Bureau zur Bekämpfung des Alkoholismus) in Lausanne, Switzerland.

== Publications ==
In 1910–1915, LKBD published the annual calendar Dieve, padėk (God, Help [Us]). The reestablished society published the calendar Laimės kalendorius (Calendar of Happiness) in 1924–1933; these calendars had 94 to 128 pages.

Before the war, the Catholic journal Vienybė acted as the organ of LKBD. The interwar LKBD published two periodicals – Sargyba (The Guard) and Žvaigždutė (Little Star). Sargyba was published in 1922–1934 and 1937–1939; its frequency varied between monthly and twice per month. Sargyba published several supplements, including Saulėtos pramogos (Sunny Entertainment) in 1923 and Jaunimo sportas (Youth Sport) in 1928–1929 about sports. Žvaigždutė was first published as a supplement to Tėvynės sargas and was merged with Angelas sargas (The Guardian Angel) in July 1923. It was a children's newspaper and became the organ of the Angelaičiai. LKBD published Žvaigždutė until 1934 when, due to financial difficulties, it was taken over by the Jesuits.

A couple of chapters of LKBD had their own periodicals, including Kas girdėt? (What Have You Heard?) in Marijampolė and Blaivybės balsas (Voice of Temperance) in Biržai.

In 1924, LKBD established a press bureau that employed about 20 people. In 1924–1925, it published 316 articles in 11 different Lithuanian periodicals. The following year, it expanded it reach to 19 periodicals, including Lietuva, Rytas, Klaipėdos žinios, Tėvynės sargas, Trimitas, Lietuvos žinios, Karys. Due to financial difficulties, the press bureau was closed in 1927.

LKBD published various brochures, booklets, and books. By 1933, it published a total of 86 such publications. By 1940, it published more than 100 books and brochures. These were translations (including works by Leo Tolstoy, Wilhelm Friedrich Bode, bishop Augustin Egger) or original works by Lithuanian authors (including Juozas Tumas, Jonas Martinaitis).

== Membership ==
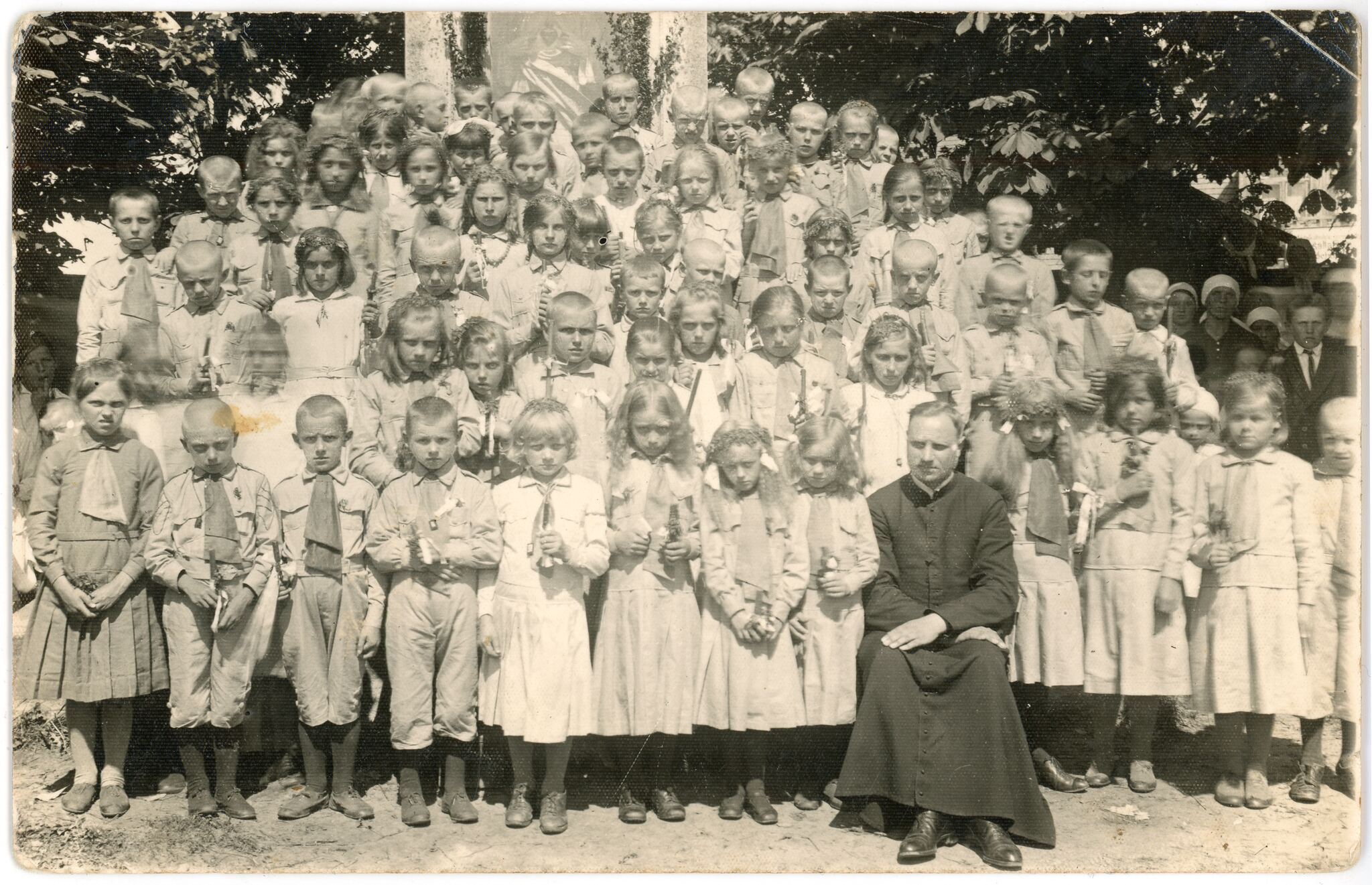
Members of Angelaičiai in Skuodas in 1930s

Initially, LKBD accepted members who were teetotalers and those who drank in moderation. There was a separate section for youth under the age of 21. Tsarist officials did not allow Lithuanians to organize a separate Catholic youth organization; in 1914, Pavasarininkai decided to organize around LKBD. In 1913, there were a total of 49,068 members: 34,766 adults (8,288 of which were teetotalers), 7,793 youth ages 16–21, and 6,509 children ages 6–15.

The interwar society limited the membership only to those who consumed drinks containing less than 2% alcohol content. In 1926, LKBD had about 22,500 members. In 1927, the rules were revised that true members had to be teetotalers. The reestablished society no longer had a children's section. A separate youth organization Angelaičiai for children ages 5 to 15 was established in 1922. It became popular and had 406 chapters with about 60,000 members in 1933.

Most of the members were women (in 1913, there were 10,719 men and 24,047 women members), though they rarely took leadership positions. They joined the society not because alcoholism was prevalent among women, but because they were subject to violence by intoxicated men (fathers, husbands). Anti-alcohol campaigns was one of the few times that domestic violence was mentioned in public discourse. It was difficult for women to join societies because frequently their husbands disapproved of such activities.

== Headquarters ==
In September 1922, the government rented the People's House (Liaudies namai) for the next 18 years to LKBD. It was a large two-floor building constructed in 1899 but neglected during the war. The society repaired it and used it as its headquarters. The building housed antialcohol museum which operated in 1927–1935. Additionally, the building housed editorial offices of society's periodicals, bookshop, library, hotel, theater, club houses.

The northern part of the building was demolished in 1936 for street enlargement. In December 1940, i.e. after the Soviet occupation, plans were adopted for an extensive reconstruction – the main wing was demolished while the rest was turned into an apartment building.

== Symbols ==
The society's emblem was a gold cross with a rising sun above it on a dark blue shield. Its flag had the motto "Brothers, be sober and vigilant."

== Chairmen ==
LKBD was chaired by:

- Gasparas Cirtautas (temporary, 1908)
- Povilas Korzonas (temporary, 1908)
- Juozapas Kerpauskas (1908–1910)
- Kazimieras Marma (1910–1914 and 1920–1922)
- Jurgis Galdikas (1914–1915)
- Juozapas Bikinas (temporary, 1919–1920)
- Juozas Stakauskas (1923–1925)
- Antanas Gylys (1926–1936)
- Jupzas Gvildys (1937–1938)
- Petras Lažinskas (1939)
- A. Jodelis (1939)
- K. Lapinskas (1939–1940)

== Bibliography ==
- Butkus, Martynas (2023). "Lietuviškos draugijos 1906-1915 metais: teisinė padėtis ir draugijų politika Vilniaus, Kauno ir Suvalkų gubernijose". Istorija (in Lithuanian). 131: 32–65. ISSN 2029-7181.
- Jasaitis, Domas (December 1968). "Dr. Antanas Gylys". Aidai (in Lithuanian). 10 (216–229).
- Kačerauskas, Jonas (2013). Blaivybė Lietuvoje: istorija ir dabartis (PDF) (in Lithuanian). Vilnius: Diemedžio leidykla. ISBN 9789986231776.
- Karčiauskaitė, Indrė (2007). Katalikiškoji moterų judėjimo srovė Lietuvoje (1907–1940) (PhD thesis) (in Lithuanian). Vytautas Magnus University. ISBN 978-9955-12-234-0.
- Kuckailis, Juozas (3 December 2008). "Prelato Juozapo Laukaičio metai, atiduoti Leipalingio parapijai". XXI amžius (in Lithuanian). 91 (1684).
- Sinkevičius, Rokas (2020). "Prarasti Kauno pastatai" (in Lithuanian). Kauno miesto muziejus.
- Tapinas, Laimonas; et al., eds. (1997). Žurnalistikos enciklopedija (PDF). Vilnius: Pradai. ISBN 9986-776-62-7.
- Tijūnaitis, Stasys (1932). "Dešimties metų "Žvaigždutė"". Sargyba (in Lithuanian). Vol. 23. pp. 350–354.
- Vasiliauskaitė-Dančenkovienė, Skaistė (17 May 2021). "Blaivybės kursai skatino tapti abstinentais". Ukmergės žinios (in Lithuanian).
- "Lietuvių katalikų blaivybės draugija". Visuotinė lietuvių enciklopedija (in Lithuanian). Mokslo ir enciklopedijų leidybos centras. 7 October 2024 [2018].
