= Angelaičiai =

Catholic children's organization in Lithuania

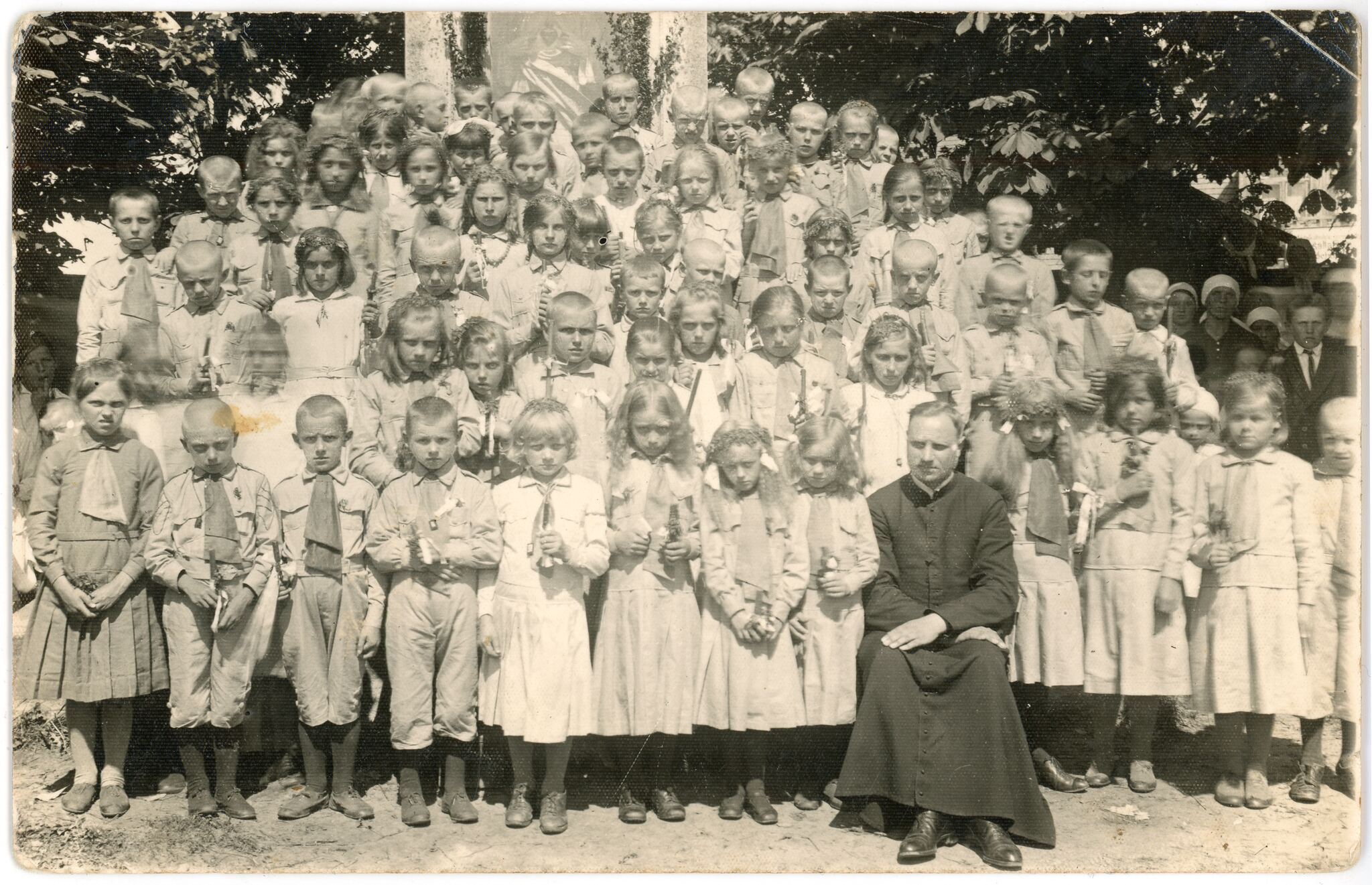
A group of children from Angelačiai in Skuodas in c. 1930

Angelaičiai were members of the Children's Union of the Guardian Angel (Lithuanian: Angelo sargo vaikų sąjunga), a Roman Catholic children's organization in interwar Lithuania. It was established as a youth section of the Lithuanian Catholic Temperance Society (LKBD) and became an independent organization in 1922. It became popular and its membership reached 60,000 members in 1933. It was closed after the Soviet occupation of Lithuania in June 1940.

== History ==
The Lithuanian Catholic Temperance Society (LKBD) was established in 1908. At the time, Tsarist officials did not allow to establish a separate Catholic youth organization. Therefore, LKBD had a section for youth and children. In 1913, there were a total of 49,068 members: 34,766 adults, 7,793 youth ages 16–21, and 6,509 children ages 6–15.

LKBD was closed due to World War I in 1915. After the war, LKBD was officially reestablished on 10 December 1919 in Kaunas, but became active in 1921. In 1922, LKBD spun off its children's section (ages 7–15) into the new Union of the Guardian Angel (renamed to Children's Union of the Guardian Angel in 1927). The two organizations remained closely related (e.g. they shared headquarters in Kaunas, LKBD published Angelaičiai's magazine Žvaigždutė, chair of Angelaičiai was a member of the board of LKBD, etc.)

Membership of Angelaičiai
Year	Members	Chapters	Ref
1927	15,000	120	
1929	27,500	232	
1932	50,000	?	
1933	60,000	406	

In 1929, the Catholic Action Center decided to merge several other Catholic children's organizations into Angelaičiai. Another reform followed in 1932. The society organized 13 courses for 500 local leaders to improve children's engagement and apply new work methods. As a result, the membership quadrupled in six years (from about 15,000 members in 1927 to 60,000 members in 1933).

Angelaičiai, along with LKBD and many other Lithuanian societies, was closed after the Soviet occupation of Lithuania in June 1940. In their mission, Angelaičiai and LKBD were succeeded by the Temperance Movement of Bishop Motiejus Valančius and its children's section Valančiukai established in 1989 during the Glasnost.

== Activities ==
Angelaičiai focused on raising responsible Catholic citizens with strong religious faith, moral virtue, respect for family, and patriotism. Additionally, they emphasized healthy living by promoting physical education and strictly prohibiting tobacco, alcohol, and gambling.

Angelaičiai organized local chapters (known as pulkas or kuopa) in various towns and villages. One of the largest chapters in Prienai had 930 members in 1929. Local chapters organized various events, including festivals, congresses, parades, amateur concerts and theater performances. Most of these events took place in summer. In summer 1932, Angelaičiai organized about 150 such local events.

Angelaičiai maintained a kindergarten for poor children in Kaunas.

== Publications ==
Angelaičiai published published the first issue of its magazine Angelas sargas (Guardian Angel) in October 1922. It was replaced by Žvaigždutė (Little Star) in July 1923. It was published monthly in 1923–1930 and twice per month in 1931–1940.

In 1931–1938, Angelaičiai published calendars Vaikų draugas (Friend of Children).

== Leadership ==
Angelaičiai was chaired by Elena Kačerauskaitė, V. Žymantas, teacher Stefanija Jonkutė, Liudas Tamošauskas, Adelė Dirsytė (1937–1938).

== Bibliography ==
- Butkus, Martynas (2023). "Lietuviškos draugijos 1906-1915 metais: teisinė padėtis ir draugijų politika Vilniaus, Kauno ir Suvalkų gubernijose". Istorija (in Lithuanian). 131: 32–65. ISSN 2029-7181.
- Kačerauskas, Jonas (2013). Blaivybė Lietuvoje: istorija ir dabartis (PDF) (in Lithuanian). Vilnius: Diemedžio leidykla. ISBN 9789986231776.
- "Vaikų draugas". Lietuvos integrali bibliotekų informacijos sistema (in Lithuanian). Lietuvos nacionalinė Martyno Mažvydo biblioteka.
- "Lietuvių katalikų blaivybės draugija". Visuotinė lietuvių enciklopedija (in Lithuanian). Mokslo ir enciklopedijų leidybos centras. 7 October 2024 [2018].
