= Anzelmas Matutis =

- Born: Anzelmas Matulevičius; 7 January 1923; Zomčinė, Lithuania
- Died: 21 September 1985 (aged 62); Alytus, Lithuanian SSR
- Resting place: Alytus
- Occupations: Poet; teacher
- Spouse: Marija Mažeikaitė
- Writing career
- Years active: 1942–1985
- Period: Soviet period in Lithuania
- Genres: Children's poetry

Anzelmas Matulevičius (7 January 1923 – 21 September 1985), better known by his pen name Anzelmas Matutis, was a Lithuanian teacher and children's poet.

== Biography ==
Anzelmas Matulevičius was born on 7 January 1923 in the village of Zomčinė to Vladas Matulevičius and Julija Šelmytė. Matulevičius had two brothers (Julius and Rolandas) and two sisters (Kazimiera and Gražina). Matulevičius already began writing poems for children in 1937, and in 1938 he began co-editing the children's newspaper Žvaigždutė. In 1939, at the age of sixteen, Matulevičius won two literary competition awards of the Žiburėlis magazine. He graduated from a teachers' seminary in Marijampolė in 1942 at the age of nineteen. On 22 February 1946, Matulevičius married Marija Mažeikaitė, with whom he had three sons, including the future endocrinologist Valentinas Matulevičius. Matulevičius worked as a teacher in Santaika, Simnas, Seirijai, and Alytus from 1942 to 1972. As a teacher, Matulevičius organized after-class literary classes and stagings of fairy tales. Although Matulevičius was poor, the parents of the students respected him and brought food such as a bottle of milk or some butter. He built a home in Alytus in 1961, which is now a memorial museum. In 1971 he built a small summerhouse in Pauosupė, nicknamed Drevė; the house, now a museum, is notable for hosting "poetry spring" ever second spring, during which the most beautiful poem for children about nature, the Earth, and Lithuania is published. The winner is awarded the Matutis Prize (young poets are also awarded since 1995). The following year he retired from teaching and began writing as a full-time occupation. In 1976 Matulevičius, along with the poet Antanas Drilinga, set sail across the Baltic, North and Atlantic oceans, and visited ports in Africa and Spain.

Matulevičius died on 21 September 1985 in Alytus, and was buried there.

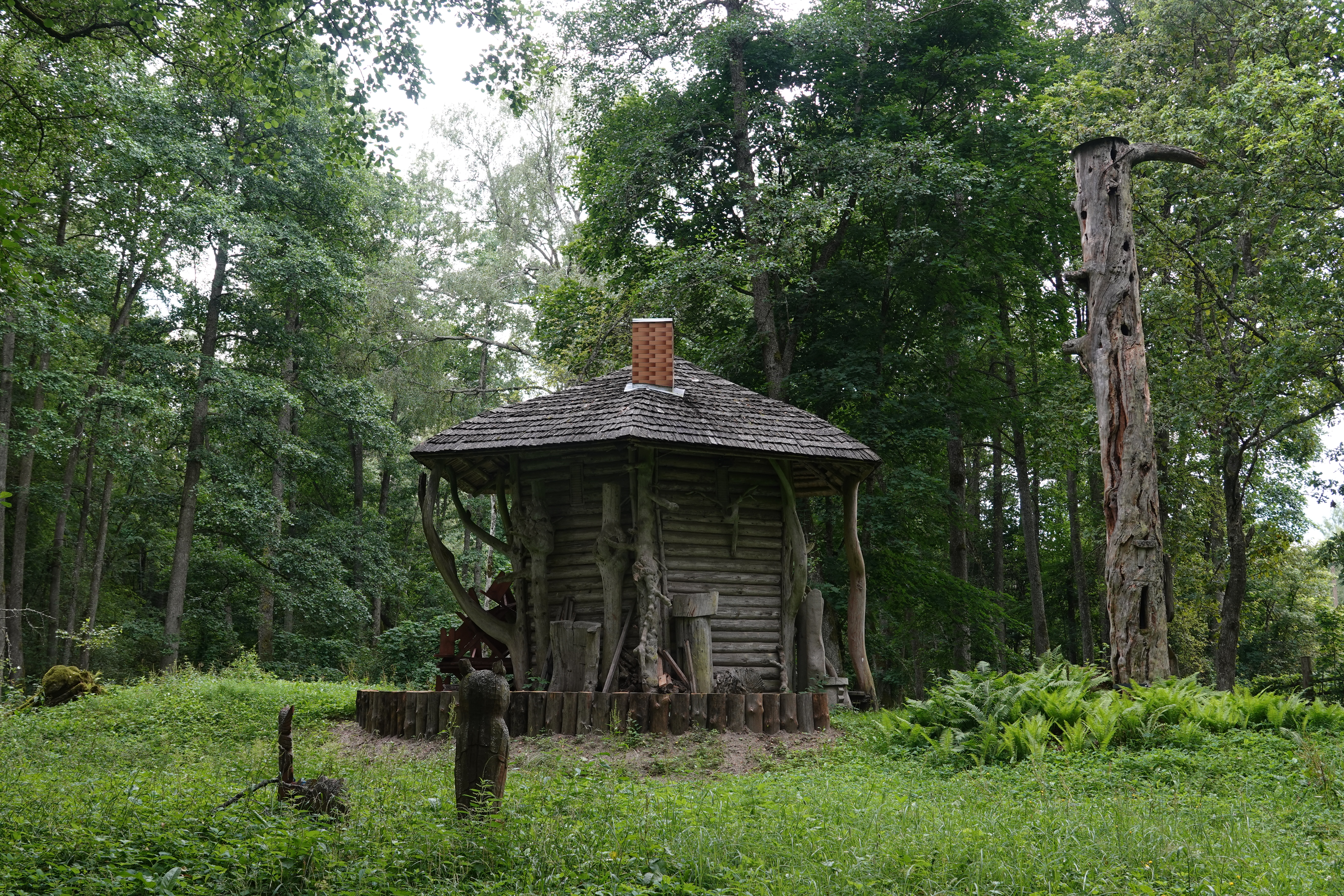
Matulevičius's summerhouse Drevė near the village of Pauosupė

== Works ==
The core focus of Matulevičius's poems was a child enjoying the world, the people around him, and childhood itself. With elements of folklore, nature and animals play a role in the poems. For his literary work, Matulevičius was awarded the Rojus Mizara prize in 1969. Three years later he was awarded the Komsomol prize, and in 1974, the USSR State Prize. In 1984 he was awarded the Hans Christian Andersen Award.
