= Pranas Vaičaitis =

Lithuanian poet

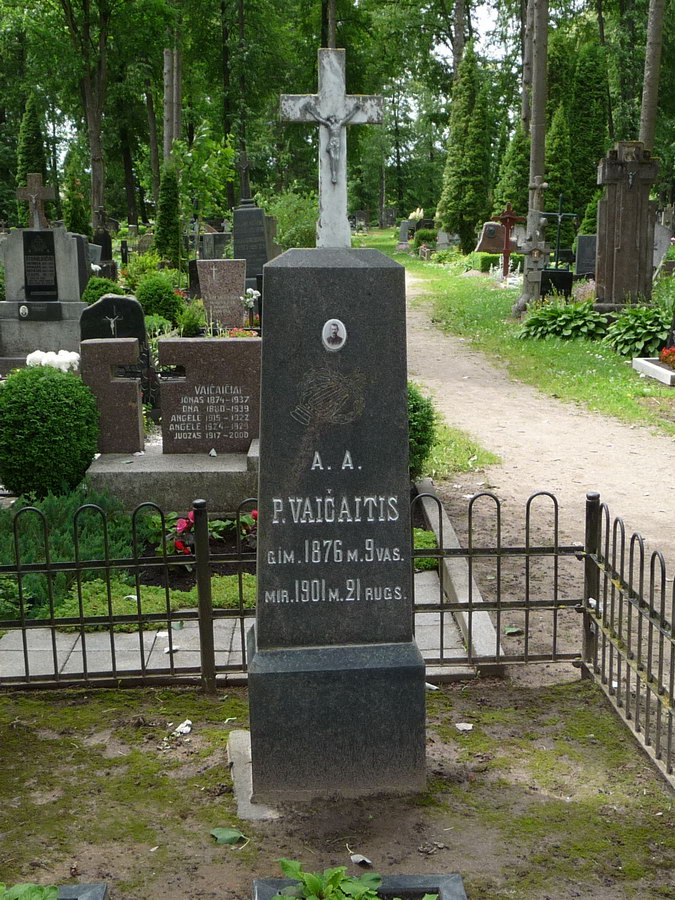
- Vaičaitis' tomb in Sintautai
- Born: 10 February 1876; Santakai, Suwałki Governorate, Congress Poland
- Died: 21 September 1901 (aged 25); Santakai, Suwałki Governorate, Congress Poland
- Burial place: Sintautai
- Other name: Pranciškus Sekupasaka (pen name)
- Education: Saint Petersburg University
- Occupation: Poet
- Partner: Fiance Julija Pranaitytė

Pranas Vaičaitis (10 February 1876 – 21 September 1901) was a Lithuanian poet. After graduation from the Marijampolė Gymnasium, he studied law at the Saint Petersburg University. Due to the violations of the Lithuanian press ban, he was imprisoned for a month in 1899 and could not find a jurist job.

With the help of professor Eduards Volters, he obtained a job at the library of the Russian Academy of Sciences before progressing tuberculosis forced him to return home. He died at the age of 25 and left less than a hundred original poems. His first poems were published in 1896 in Varpas though the vast majority of them were published in Vienybė lietuvninkų, a Lithuanian newspaper published in Plymouth, Pennsylvania. The first collection of his poems was published posthumously in 1903 in the United States. His poems are popular, particularly those about nature in Lithuania, and have been adopted to folk songs. His poetry is sensitive, intimate, without more complex metaphors or lyrical devices, and with a depth of feeling that distinguishes it from other poetry of the period.

== Biography ==
=== Early life and education ===
Vaičaitis was born in the Santakai village on the Penta river near Sintautai, Suwałki Governorate, Congress Poland. He attended a primary school in Sintautai and Marijampolė Gymnasium. He started writing poetry at age 13, but his earliest poems have not survived. As typical of the period, his parents wanted him to become a priest and continue education at the Sejny Priest Seminary, but he felt no calling for priesthood and instead chose to study law at the Saint Petersburg University in 1895. His parents refused to support him financially due to his refusal to become a priest; his father remained cold and distant until his death. He received assistance from professor Eduards Volters, but struggled financially. According to visitor logs kept by Volters, he was visited by Vaičaitis 29 times in 1895 (the first time on 23 August), 33 times in 1896, and 69 times in 1897.

At the university, he met fellow Lithuanian student Povilas Višinskis, who became known as a mentor of literary talent. Višinskis sent three of his poems to Varpas even though the editors discouraged submissions of poetry as too many of the submitted poems were too amateurish and dilettantish; the poems were published in 1896 with an editor's note that while Vaičaitis' poetry was better than average, it was still weak. Perhaps insulted by such a reception, Vaičaitis sent his other poems to Vienybė lietuvninkų, a Lithuanian newspaper published in Plymouth, Pennsylvania. This newspaper published more than sixty of his poems under pen name Pranciškus Sekupasaka in 1897.

In the summer of 1896, Vaičaitis met Julija Pranaitytė at the home of her brother-in-law Saliamonas Banaitis. At the time, Pranaitytė was a gymnasium student in Saint Petersburg and they developed a close friendship that culminated in their engagement.

=== Arrest and illness ===
In 1897, Vaičaitis was implicated in the Sietynas case. Sietynas was an organization of Lithuanian book smugglers that smuggled and distributed the banned Lithuanian press. Police found a small library of the illegal books with his cousin Antanas Pranas Daniliauskas. Since one of his seized letters discussed obtaining the history of Lithuania by Simonas Daukantas for Vaičaitis, he was also searched by the police which found a handwritten copy of a Lithuanian poem by Antanas Baranauskas. This was a particularly difficult time for Vaičaitis as he lost his university stipend and was monitored by the police for a year. He was imprisoned for a month in 1899 at the Peter and Paul Fortress.

Vaičaitis graduated from the university in June 1899, but as politically compromised, he could not obtain a jurist job with the Russian government. He had plans to study commerce in Belgium, but he did not have funds. With the help of Volters (there are hints that Vaičaitis lived with Volters for about six months), he managed to get a job at the library of the Russian Academy of Sciences, but, due to progressing illness, he had to return home in April 1901. He was treated by Jonas Staugaitis and cared for by his fiancé Pranaitytė, but the family had no money for more extensive treatments and the tuberculosis progressed. He died on 21 September 1901 in his parents' home. His tombstone was organized by Saliamonas Banaitis. He collected 95 rubles, purchased the monument in Kaunas, and transported it to the cemetery in Sintautai. It was installed for the first anniversary of his death. The tombstone cost more than 95 rubles and Volters covered the difference of 23.5 rubles.

== Works ==
Vaičaitis left 98 known original poems and 21 translations of poems by Russian and Polish authors, including Alexander Pushkin, Mikhail Lermontov, Nikolay Nekrasov, Nikolay Yazykov, and Maria Konopnicka. His manuscripts have not survived. In 2008, three new poems and one quatrain were discovered among other papers that belonged to Martynas Jankus during a renovation of a house in Kaunas. The booklet also contained a loose and shortened translation of Christmas Eve by Nikolai Gogol, which was published by Jankus in 1892. One of the poems is dated 1883, but that would mean that Vaičaitis wrote it when he was seven years old. The neat handwriting indicates that it was written by a gymnasium student, thus dating the text to 1890–1891.

Vaičaitis' poetry is sensitive, intimate, natural, and without more complex metaphors or lyrical devices. The depth of feeling distinguishes him from other late 19th-century Lithuanian poets. His poetry has features of both romantic poetry and literary realism. It includes both traditions of Lithuanian folk songs (including common folk personifications, parallels, and precision of poetic scenes) – several of his poems have been transformed into popular folk songs – and elements of well known Russian and Polish poets. The poetry varies in topic (nature, history, patriotism, social inequality, religion, personal experiences) and in mood (love, regret, nostalgia, anger, irony), but often expresses ideas of serving your nation and seeking justice. His later poetry is particularly melancholic due to the sense of his approaching death; he was the first to write elegies in Lithuanian. Other genres included sonnets, ballads, satires, and epigrams. His works have influenced other poets, including Jonas Krikščiūnas (Jovaras), Liudas Gira, Julius Janonis.

Vaičaitis' poems were first collected and published by the editorial staff of Vienybė lietuvninkų in the United States in 1903. In 1904, Eduards Volters published a collection of Pushkin's poems translated into Lithuanian, which was dedicated to Vaičaitis and included two of his translations. The second edition (1912) of his poems was also published in the United States. His collected works, edited by Liudas Gira, though incomplete, were published in Lithuania in 1921. Various poetry collections followed: Lyrika ir satyra (1951), Rinktinė (1956), Yra šalis (1964), Lėkite, dainos (1975), Kas našlaičius priglaus? (1988). A new edition of collected works was prepared by Albertas Zalatorius and Zenius Šileris and published in 1996. His biography was published by Juozas Klimaitis (1994) and Zenius Šileris (2001).

== Memory ==
In 1936, Vincas Grybas prepared a model for a monument to Vaičaitis, but it was not erected due to financial difficulties and the outbreak of World War II. A small museum exposition was collected in 1965; it was housed at the secondary school in Sintautai before it was moved to the homestead of the Vaičaitis family in 1995. A wooden sculpture by Kęstutis Krasauskas was installed at the homestead in 1996. A granite monument to Vaičaitis by sculptor Juozas Šlivinskas was unveiled in Sintautai in 2013.
