= Žvaigždutė (Kaunas) =

Lithuanian-language children's magazine (1923–1940)

Žvaigždutė (transl. Little Star) was a Lithuanian-language children's magazine published in Kaunas from February 1923 to June 1940. It was an organ of Angelaičiai, a Roman Catholic children's organization which promoted temperance. It published mainly religious and didactic texts, but also poetry and fairytales. Its circulation was 18,000 copies in 1938.

== History ==
Angelaičiai published published the first issue of its magazine Angelas sargas (Guardian Angel) in October 1922. It was merged with Žvaigždutė in July 1923. Žvaigždutė was first published as a supplement to Tėvynės sargas but quickly grew to become an independent publication.

It was published monthly in 1923–1930 and twice per month in 1931–1940. Circulation of Žvaigždutė grew from 2,000 to 10,000 copies in 1932 and 18,000 copies in 1938. The first issues were without illustrations, but it soon began publishing various drawings and photographs. The number of pages varied from 8 in 1923 to 24 in 1931. The annual subscription cost two litas in 1923 and four litas in 1932.

Žvaigždutė financially was not self-sustaining. By 1932, only in 1930 it was able to cover its expenses from subscription fees. The magazine was published by the Lithuanian Catholic Temperance Society until 1934 when, due to financial difficulties, the publication was taken over by the Jesuits. It was later published by Malda Company (1938) and by the Catholic Action Center (1940). The last issue was published on 16 June 1940, a day after the Soviet occupation of Lithuania.

== Content ==
Texts of Žvaigždutė (1923–1932)
| Category | Number of texts | % |
|---|---|---|
| Poetry | 837 | 31.2% |
| Religious texts | 625 | 23.3% |
| Lithuanian fairytales | 272 | 10.1% |
| Foreign fairytales | 62 | 2.3% |
| Temperance related | 160 | 6.0% |
| World news | 155 | 5.8% |
| Biographies | 68 | 2.5% |
| Nature and technology | 51 | 1.9% |
| About Vilnius | 46 | 1.7% |
| About Lithuania | 28 | 1.0% |
| Works for children's theater | 15 | 0.6% |
| Other | 364 | 13.6% |

The title was suggested by a daughter of the magazine's first editor Stasys Tijūnaitis. He had previously worked with Šaltinis and contributed articles to its supplement for children Šaltinėlis. Thus the first issues continued their traditions.

The magazine's content was mainly didactic and reflected Angelaičiai's mission of raising responsible Catholic citizens with strong religious faith, moral virtue, respect for family, and patriotism. Additionally, they emphasized healthy living by promoting physical education and strictly prohibiting tobacco, alcohol, and gambling. The magazine was criticized for boring, overly didactic content. For example, it kept preaching about the harms of alcohol to children who did not consume alcoholic drinks.

The magazine also published secular texts and articles on local geography and history. For example, it paid attention to Vilnius Region which was disputed between Lithuania and the Second Polish Republic. The magazine published fiction and poetry by various Lithuanian writers, including Bernardas Brazdžionis, Matas Grigonis, Anzelmas Matutis, Leonardas Žitkevičius, Vytautas Tamulaitis, Leonas Vitkauskas, Paulius Drevinis, Antanas Zabulionis, and others.

Žvaigždutė published reports from the various chapters of Angelaičiai highlighting their activities and achievements.

The magazine encouraged children to collect examples of Lithuanian folklore (fairytales, riddles, proverbs, etc.). As a result of these efforts, five volumes with 79 fairytales were published in 1927–1932 and additional two volumes with 28 fairytales were planned.

== Editors ==
The magazine was edited by:

- 1923–1933: Stasys Tijūnaitis
- 1933–1934: Jonas Mikulevičius
- 1935: J. Blažys
- 1936–1937: Jonas Paukštys
- 1938–1940: Jonas Kuzmickis
