= Liudas Gira =

Lithuanian poet, writer and literary critic

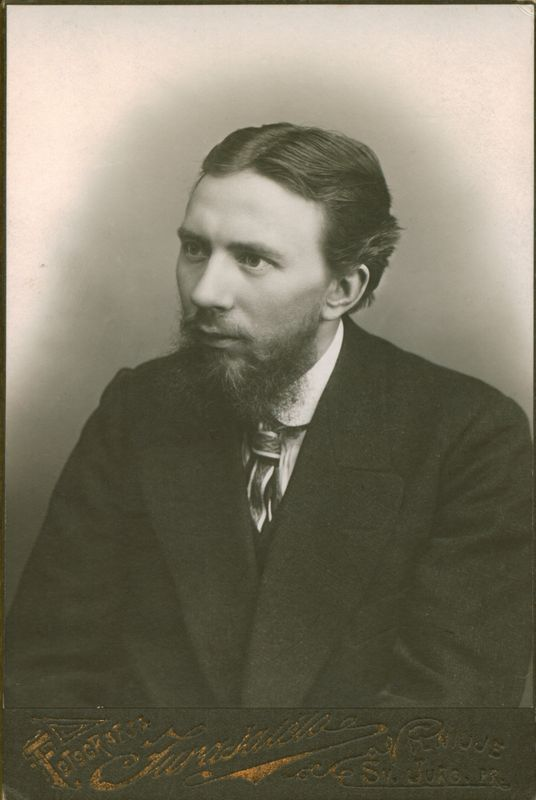
Liudas Gira around 1915

Liudas Gira (27 August 1884 in Vilnius – 1 July 1946 in Vilnius) was a Lithuanian poet, writer, and literary critic. His is noted for his early poetry, which resembles traditional Lithuanian folk songs. Gira was active in cultural and political life, gradually shifting towards communism in 1930s. He supported the Soviet Union and helped to transform independent Lithuania into the Lithuanian Soviet Socialist Republic. His son, Vytautas Sirijos Gira, is also a known poet and writer.

== Biography ==
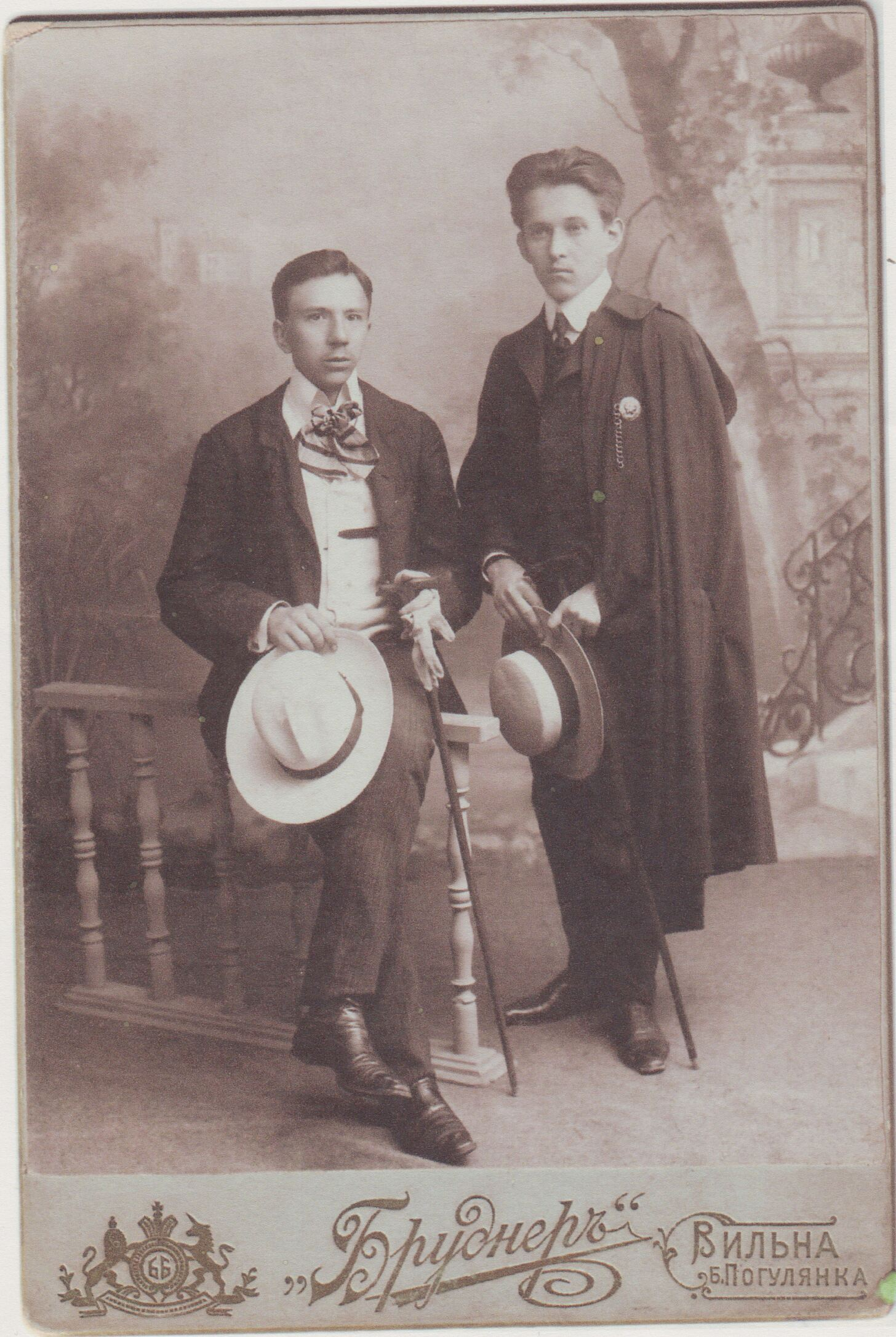
Vincas Krėvė and Liudas Gira, early 20th century

In 1905, Gira graduated from the Vilnius Theological Seminary, but was not ordained into priesthood. He was active in cultural and political life. Gira participated in the Great Seimas of Vilnius. He was one of the founders of the Lithuanian Populists' Union and one of the leaders of the Lithuanian Christian Democratic Party. In the aftermath of World War I, Gira joined the Lithuanian army, but was jailed by the Bolsheviks during the Lithuanian–Soviet War for six months. He briefly headed the Lithuanian intelligence and helped to discover and liquidate the attempted Polish coup d'état against the Lithuanian government in 1919. Later he worked as theater director (1922–1926) and as secretary of commission responsible for book publishing under the Ministry of Education (1926–1936).

In 1930s his political views shifted to communism and he supported the occupation and annexation of Lithuania by the Soviet Union in June 1940. Elected to the People's Seimas, Gira was one of the 20-member delegation sent to petition the Soviet Union to accept the newly proclaimed Lithuanian SSR into the union. He served as Assistant Commissar of Education until occupation by Nazi Germany in June 1941. Gira fled to the Russian SFSR and joined the 16th Rifle Division. After the war he returned to Lithuania, became a full member of the Lithuanian Academy of Sciences and was recognized as the People's Poet of the Lithuanian SSR.

== Works ==
Poetry is most important of Gira's works. The early works borrowed from traditional Lithuanian folk songs of Dzūkija region. Because they resembled songs, several poems were set to music and became popular songs. These works idealize Lithuanian history and have features of romanticism. The poems also describe emotional, intimate experiences; they are melancholic and elegant. The early poems were published in several collections, including Dul dul dūdelė (1909), Žalioji pievelė (1911), Laukų dainos (1912), Tėvynės keliais (1912). Later works were influenced by symbolism and feature love and patriotism. Compilations from this period include Žiežirbos (1921), Žygio godos (1928), Šilko gijos (1928), Amžių žingsniai (1929). The last works were produced under the Soviet influence, reflected the official Soviet propaganda, and conformed to demands of Socialist realism. These poems rejoiced Lithuania's conversion into a soviet socialist republic, praised the Soviet Union, and described heroic Soviet struggle against Nazi Germany. They were published in Žalgirio Lietuva (1942), Smurtas ir ryžtas (1942), Tolimuos keliuos (1945). Gira also wrote several plays, including Kerštas (1910), Svečiai (1910), Paparčio žiedas (1928). These works borrowed plots from heroic episodes of the Lithuanian history and were influenced by Vincas Krėvė-Mickevičius, Vydūnas, and Stanisław Przybyszewski. Posthumously his works were published in five volumes in 1960–1963. Gira began writing for periodicals in 1901. He wrote for and edited newspapers Vilniaus žinios (1905–06), Šviesa (1906), and Lietuvos ūkininkas (1907), literary almanac Švyturys (1911–12), first Lithuanian literary journal Vaivorykštė (1913–14), Literatūros naujienos (1938–39). He also translated poems by Alexander Pushkin, Mikhail Lermontov, Konstantin Balmont, Władysław Syrokomla, Heinrich Heine, Taras Shevchenko into the Lithuanian language. He also experimented in writing poetry in Polish, Russian, Belarusian languages. Gira compiled and published works by Lithuanian writers Antanas Strazdas, Lazdynų Pelėda, Ksaveras Sakalauskas-Vanagėlis, Pranas Vaičaitis, and Edmundas Steponaitis. He also compiled several anthologies of Lithuanian poetry, including Lietuva pavasarį, vasarą, rudenį ir žiemą (1911), Cit, paklausykit (1914), Aš deklamuoju! (1929), Mūsų tėvynė (1930).
