= Matas Grigonis =

Lithuanian activist, writer, educator (1851–1927)

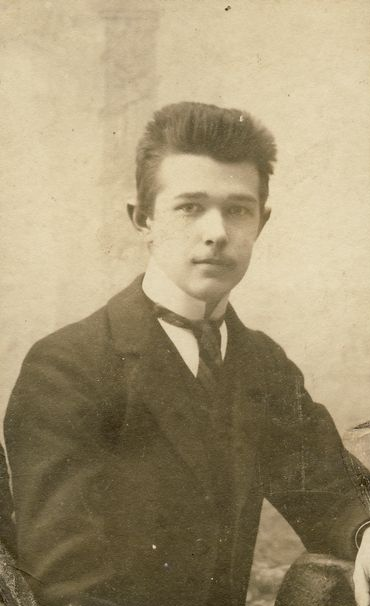
- Grigonis in his youth
- Born: 3 October 1889; Miškiniai, Panemunėlis, Russian Empire
- Died: 7 January 1971 (aged 81); Vilnius, Lithuania
- Resting place: Rokantiškės Cemetery
- Education: Mitau Gymnasium (1900–1906), Vilnius Gymnasium (1906–1907)
- Children: Matas Kastytis Grigonis
- Parents: Dominykas Grigonis (father); Julijona Bareišytė-Grigonienė (mother)
- Relatives: Pranciškus Grigonis (brother), Ignas Grigonis (brother)
- Awards: Officer's Cross of Order of the Lithuanian Grand Duke Gediminas (1928)

Matas Grigonis (also known in his pseudonyms: Svirno Žvynė, Matas Gojelis, Dile Matas; 3 October 1889 – 7 January 1971) was a Lithuanian writer, educator, ethnographer, naturalist and is considered as one of the most active Lithuanian cultural figures of the early 20th century.

== Biography ==
Grigonis was born in Miškiniai village in a family of peasant farmers Dominykas Grigonis and Julijona Bareišytė-Grigonienė. He had two brothers Pranciškus and Ignas (died being just one year old). His mother died early when he was just one year old and in 1893 his father married for a second time, thus he grew up with his stepmother.

In 1897–1900, Grigonis studied at Rokiškis Elementary School. Subsequently, Grigonis studied at the Mitau Gymnasium in 1900–1906 and the Vilnius Gymnasium in 1906–1907. He gained a qualification of the Lithuanian language teacher and has written tens of Lithuanian books for children, while his collection of poems Kvietkelis is the first Lithuanian children's poetry book, which was published in 1913.

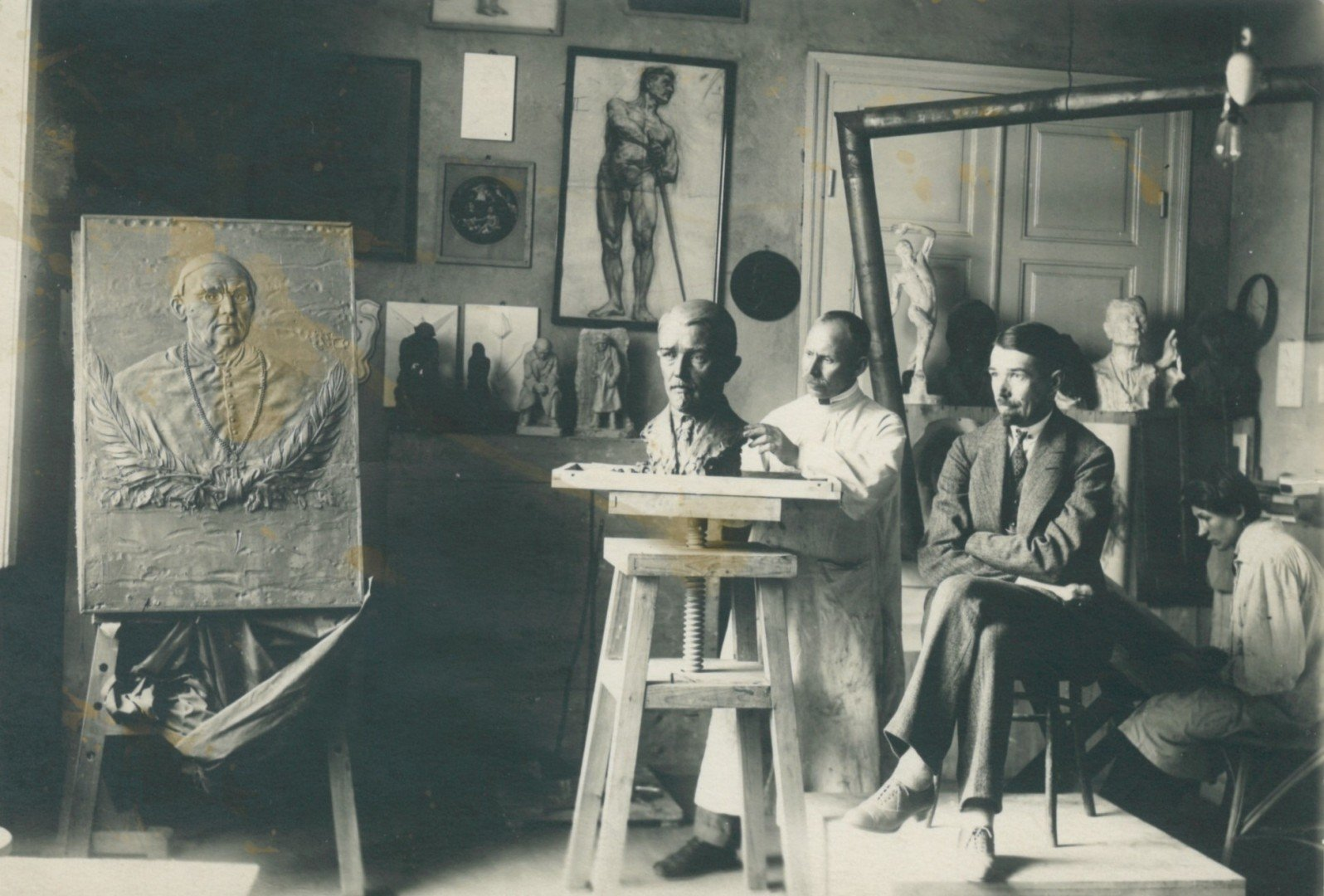
Juozas Zikaras creating a bust of Grigonis in Panevėžys in 1925

Since 1907–1909 for many years (with breaks) Grigonis lived and taught in Panevėžys and actively contributed to its cultural and educational life. He also visited Rokiškis to participate in Lithuanian events. Moreover, Grigonis since 1908 actively participated in the Lithuanian periodical press where his works were printed titled with his pseudonyms.

During the World War I in 1915 he departed deeper to the territory of the Russian Empire (e.g. lived in Kineshma, Voronezh, Yaroslavl) where he worked as a teacher of the Lithuanian language and literature (e.g. for Lithuanian war refugees).

In the summer of 1918 Grigonis returned to Lithuania and once again worked in the education sphere in Panevėžys. Furthermore, in the interwar period he closely interacted with Lithuanian intellectuals, writers Juozas Tumas-Vaižgantas, Antanas Vienuolis, Bronė Buivydaitė, etc. In 1928, he was awarded with the Officer's Cross of Order of the Lithuanian Grand Duke Gediminas.

After the World War II Grigonis stayed in the Soviet occupied Lithuania and since 1948 specialized in plant breeding. Since 1957 his health significantly deteriorated and he stopped participating in plant breeding.

Since 1965 Grigonis lived in Lithuania's capital city Vilnius in his son Matas Kastytis Grigonis' home and lost his sight in the late years.

Grigonis died on January 7, 1971 in Vilnius and was buried in the Rokantiškės Cemetery in Vilnius.
