= Vincas Pietaris =

Lithuanian author and doctor (1850–1902)

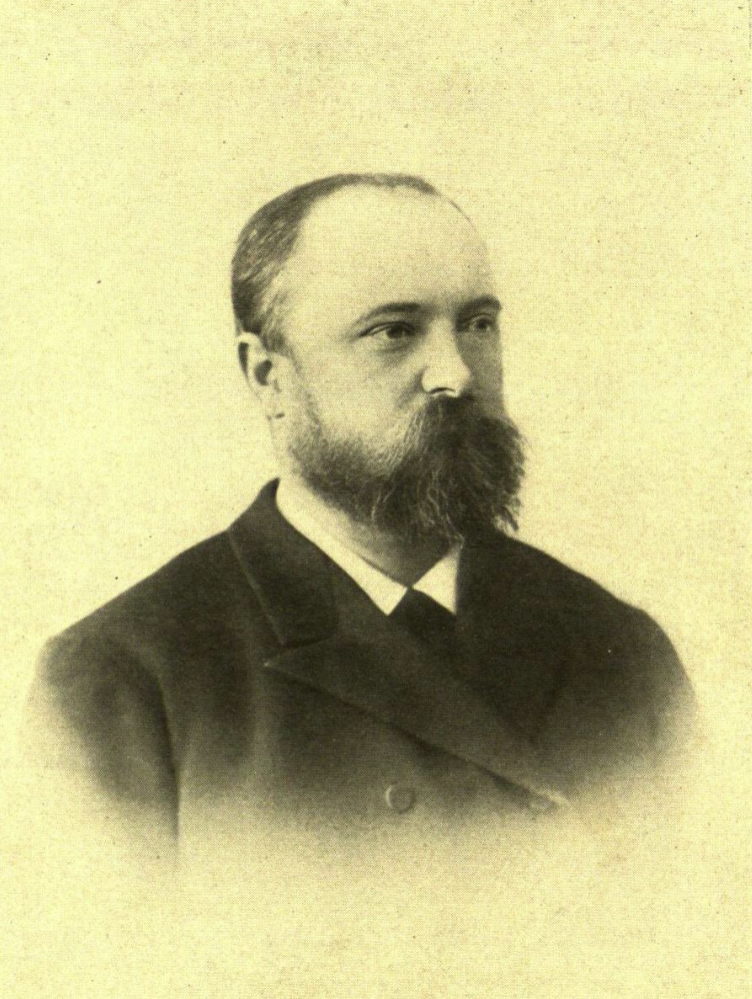
- Born: 9 October [O.S. 27 September] 1850; Žiūriai, Russian Empire
- Died: 3 October 1902 (aged 51); Ustyuzhna, Russian Empire
- Resting place: Ustyuzhna cemetery
- Education: Imperial Moscow University
- Occupations: Writer, publicist, literary critic, doctor
- Spouse: Maria Nikolayevna Kosovich
- Writing career
- Notable work: Algimantas

Vincas Pietaris (9 October [O.S. 27 September] 1850 – 3 October 1902) was a Lithuanian doctor and writer active during the Lithuanian National Revival. He is best known as the author of Algimantas, the first Lithuanian historical novel.

== Biography ==
Vincas Pietaris was born on 9 October [O.S. 27 September] 1850 in the village of Žiūriai, then part of the Russian Empire (modern-day Vilkaviškis District). He was the youngest child of his family.

Pietaris learned to read and write at home with a private village teacher (daraktorius in Lithuanian). He began attending primary school in Pilviškiai in 1859. From 1861 to 1870 Pietaris attended the Marijampolė Gymnasium and the Suwałki Boys' Gymnasium, although periodically due to famine at his home. In 1870 he received a government stipend to study in Moscow. In 1875 he graduated from the faculty of physics and mathematics of the Imperial Moscow University, and in 1879 graduated from the faculty of medicine. After his studies, Pietaris married Maria Nikolayevna Kosovich, with whom he had six children. In Moscow, Pietaris met Jonas Basanavičius, a fellow student. From 1879 to 1883 Pietaris worked as a doctor in Demyansk, his wife's hometown. Pietaris also researched diseases such as tuberculosis and typhus, for which he developed effective cures. Pietaris could draw, paint, and play the violin. He translated Ignacy Łysowski's Trzy nauki gospodarskie, which was published in Ragainė.

Pietaris and his wife moved to Ustyuzhna in 1883, where he would spend the rest of his life. In Ustyuzhna, Pietaris met the deported priest and philosopher Adomas Jakštas, who encouraged the doctor to write. Pietaris promptly began working on magazines including Varpas, Tėvynės sargas, and Ūkininkas under various pen-names, although Savasis would be his most popular pen-name. Jakštas remembered Pietaris as "Plump, round-faced, healthy red, of medium height, he made a very pleasant impression on me. From this first meeting, we felt close to each other, as if we had known each other for several years". As Lithuania was part of the Russian Empire, Jakštas and Pietaris theorized over a potential new home for Lithuanians, including Madagascar (many years before Kazys Pakštas's ideas) and Argentina. Pietaris briefly lived in Kaunas in 1896, where he raised his six children before leaving them in the city to return to Ustyuzhna. He also briefly taught at the Ustyuzhna Girls' Gymnasium from 1901 to 1902.

Pietaris died in Ustyuzhna on 3 October 1902. He was buried in the town's cemetery. In 1903 after his death, Jonas Basanavičius and Adomas Jakštas exchanged letters on the possibility of releasing his works in two volumes for the Lithuanian public.

== Writing ==
Pietaris wrote about twenty stories that had elements of folklore and didactic autobiography. A large number of his works have the village life setting. For example, in Spragaručio žiedas (1894), a poor peasant family wishes to become rich by finding a fern blossom. Pietaris also describes the decay of the foundations of old villages in Kreivose atžalose. In these stories, Pietaris marks industriousness and nationalism of the wealthier man. He also wrote a story for children entitled Lapės gyvenimas ir mirtis (1905). That same year, Pietaris began the autobiographical genre in Lithuania with Iš mano atsiminimų. His story Keidošių Onutė (1899) displayed the formation of Lithuanian intelligentsia, described ideas of the Lithuanian national movement and encouraged women's education.

Along with his literary career, Pietaris also wrote articles on linguistics, history, ethnology, geology, and engaged in literary criticism. His works have been compared to that of Juozas Tumas-Vaižgantas.

=== Historical fiction ===
Pietaris was also known for his historical works, such as the historical drama Kova ties Žalgiriais (1906), which elevates Vytautas the Great and satirizes the Poles and Jogaila during the Battle of Grunwald. In the Lietuviai amžių glūdumose (1894), Pietaris presents an idealized picture of Lithuania's past in contrast to his bleak modern-day counterpart.

Algimantas, written from 1900 to 1902, but not published until 1904, is Pietaris's most famous work. In its preface, Pietaris explains that he sought to paint Lithuania's past as in his imagination as a counter to the negative treatment of Lithuanian history presented in the chronicles of other nations. The multi-layered, unbalanced novel portrays a unified formation of the Lithuanian state against the deceptive duke of Volhynia Roman as well as his ally in Lithuania Aršusis. Along with being Algimantas's uncle, Aršusis married an Orthodox foreigner. The novel has elements of romanticism. Probably inspired by the works of Henryk Sienkiewicz and Mirko Jelusich, it is the first novel and work of historical fiction in Lithuania. Although criticized for its predictable characters and bland portrayal of good and evil, the novel is noted for its greater cultural than aesthetic significance. Algimantas was published after the author's death in 1904–1906 in the United States (Shenandoah, Pennsylvania). The manuscripts were also handed over to Jakštas through Pietaris's wife.

== Remembrance ==
A street in Aukštieji Šančiai was named after him in 1924. In 1970, a memorial plaque was uncovered in the old town of Kaunas. The plaque was destroyed in 2004. In 2002, a cenotaph dedicated to Pietaris was uncovered in the Marijampolė old cemetery by Stanislovas Gediminas Ilgūnas.

== Bibliography ==
- Bučys, Algimantas (1979). Literatūros atvaizdai (in Lithuanian). Vaga.
- Subačius, Paulius (2001). Tekstologija: teorijos ir praktikos gairės (in Lithuanian). Aidai. ISBN 9955-445-28-9.
- Riškus, Jonas (1982). Lietuvių literatūra: XIX a. pirmoji pusė (in Lithuanian). Vilnius: Mokslas.
