= Eduards Volters =

Baltic German scholar

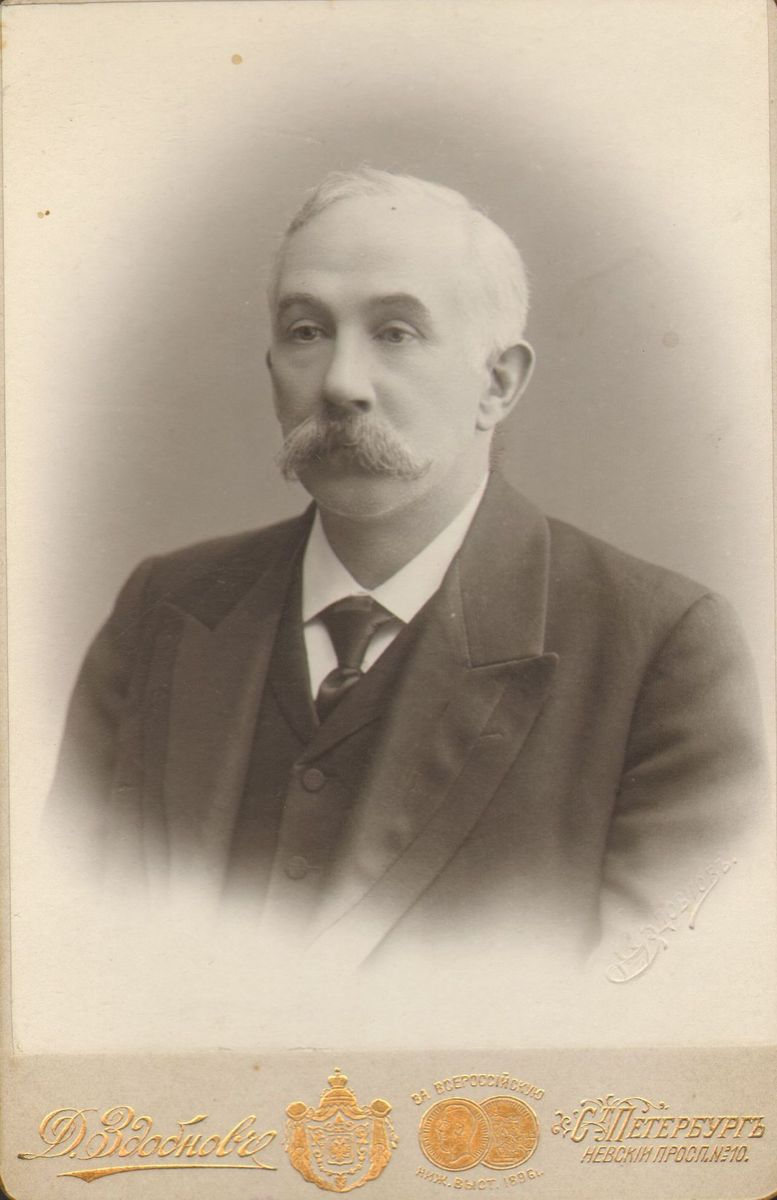
- Volters around 1900
- Born: Karl Eduard Gottfried Wolter; 18 March 1856; Riga, Russian Empire
- Died: 14 December 1941 (aged 85); Kaunas, Reichskommissariat Ostland
- Education: Leipzig University; Dorpat University; Kharkiv University
- Occupations: Linguist, archaeologist, university professor, librarian
- Employer(s): Saint Petersburg University; Vytautas Magnus University
- Spouse: Aleksandra Maslauskaitė-Volterienė

Eduards Volters (18 March 1856 – 14 December 1941) was a linguist, ethnographer, archaeologist who studied the Baltic languages and culture. He was a long-time professor at the Saint Petersburg University (1886–1918) and Vytautas Magnus University (1922–1934).

Volters, born in Riga, studied linguistics in Germany, present-day Estonia, and Ukraine earning his master's degree in 1883. In 1886–1918, he lived in Saint Petersburg where he taught at the Saint Petersburg University and worked as a librarian at the Library of the Russian Academy of Sciences. He supported and encouraged Lithuanian and Latvian students and joined their cultural activities. In 1918, Volters moved to Vilnius and started organizing the Central Library of Lithuania (considered to be the predecessor of the Martynas Mažvydas National Library of Lithuania). Due to the Polish–Soviet War, he moved to Kaunas where he lived until his death. He established and headed the Central Library (1920–1922), was director of the Kaunas City Museum (1922–1936), and taught various courses at the Vytautas Magnus University (1922–1934).

Volters' interests were varied – linguistics, ethnology, folklore, archaeology. He was a prolific writer and authored more than 400 articles in Lithuanian, Latvian, German, Russian, though much or his collected material remains unpublished. In 1883–1887, he organized expeditions to collect ethnographic data and folklore examples in Lithuania and Latvia. In 1908–1909, Volters made the first audio recordings of Lithuanian folk songs. In total, Volters and his assistants collected some 1,000 fairy tales, 300 songs, and 2,000 examples of riddles, proverbs, jokes, etc. He prepared and published methodologies and instructions on how to collect ethnographic data to preserve accuracy and authenticity. Initially supportive of the Lithuanian press ban, Volters soon became its critic and managed to get a few Lithuanian publications approved and published for academic purposes, including the reprint of the Catechism, or Education Obligatory to Every Christian by Mikalojus Daukša in 1884. He published a statistical work on the inhabited localities in the Suwałki Governorate in 1901 and had similar works planned for the Kovno and Vilna Governorates. He also carried out or supervised several archaeological excavations – various tumuli in 1888–1889, Apuolė hill fort and tumulus in 1928–1931, Kaunas Castle in 1930 and 1932.

== Biography ==
Volters was born on 18 March [O.S. 6 March] 1856 in Hagensberg (Āgenskalns), a district of Riga, to a family of a pharmacist of Baltic German origin. His nationality is ambiguous and there is no consensus whether he should be considered German, Latvian, or Lithuanian. He attended the Nicholas I Gymnasium in Riga. He studied linguistics and Slavic languages at the Leipzig University and Dorpat University and defended his master's thesis (advisor Alexander Potebnja) at the Kharkiv University in 1883. Encouraged by professors August Leskien, Karl Brugmann, Aleksander Brückner, Adalbert Bezzenberger, Volters decided to study Baltic languages and culture.

In 1884, he was elected a true member of the Imperial Russian Geographical Society. In 1886–1918, he taught at the Saint Petersburg University as a privatdozent. The subjects included bibliography, Lithuanian and Latvian languages and ethnography, ancient history of Lithuania. He supported Lithuanian and Latvian students, including Pranas Vaičaitis, Povilas Višinskis, Kazimieras Būga, Antanas Smetona, Rainis, Pēteris Šmits. From 1894, he also worked as a librarian at the Library of the Russian Academy of Sciences. In 1904–1917, he was state censor of Lithuanian theater plays. He had a reputation as a lenient censor who allowed patriotic and historical plays that glorified episodes from the former Grand Duchy of Lithuania but was stricter on any commentary related to social inequality. He was a member of the Lithuanian Literary Society and the Lithuanian Scientific Society and gifted them 1,037 and 1,337 books, respectively.

In November 1918, Volters traveled to Germany and Austria-Hungary to purchase Polish books for the Library of the Russian Academy of Sciences. Due to wartime chaos, he got stuck in Vilnius. Here he worked with Vaclovas Biržiška, People's Commissar of Education of the Lithuanian Soviet Socialist Republic, on establishing the Central Library of Lithuania (considered to be the predecessor of the Martynas Mažvydas National Library of Lithuania). When the city was captured by Poland in the Vilna offensive during the Polish–Soviet War, the library was closed in May 1919 and Volters was invited to Kaunas by President Antanas Smetona. He established the Central Library and headed it until 1922. He then became director of the Kaunas City Museum. He also taught at the Higher Courses and headed its humanities section. He was one of the key figures working to transform the courses into the University of Lithuania in 1922. He headed the archaeology section (established in 1926) and taught various courses on archaeology, numismatics, Baltic prehistory, philology of Latvian, German, Bulgarian, Old Church Slavonic. However, he had a stutter and didn't have success in public speaking.

Volters retired in 1934 and devoted his time to writing memoirs and articles on history. He died on 14 December 1941 and was buried in the Lutheran corner of the old Kaunas city cemetery. His grave was destroyed when the cemetery was turned into the present-day Ramybė Park. During his life, Volters amassed a large personal library. After his death, about 4,000 volumes were donated to the Central Library which promised to keep the books as a single collection. But due to World War II and chaotic post-war years, the collection was dispersed among various libraries.

== Research and publications ==
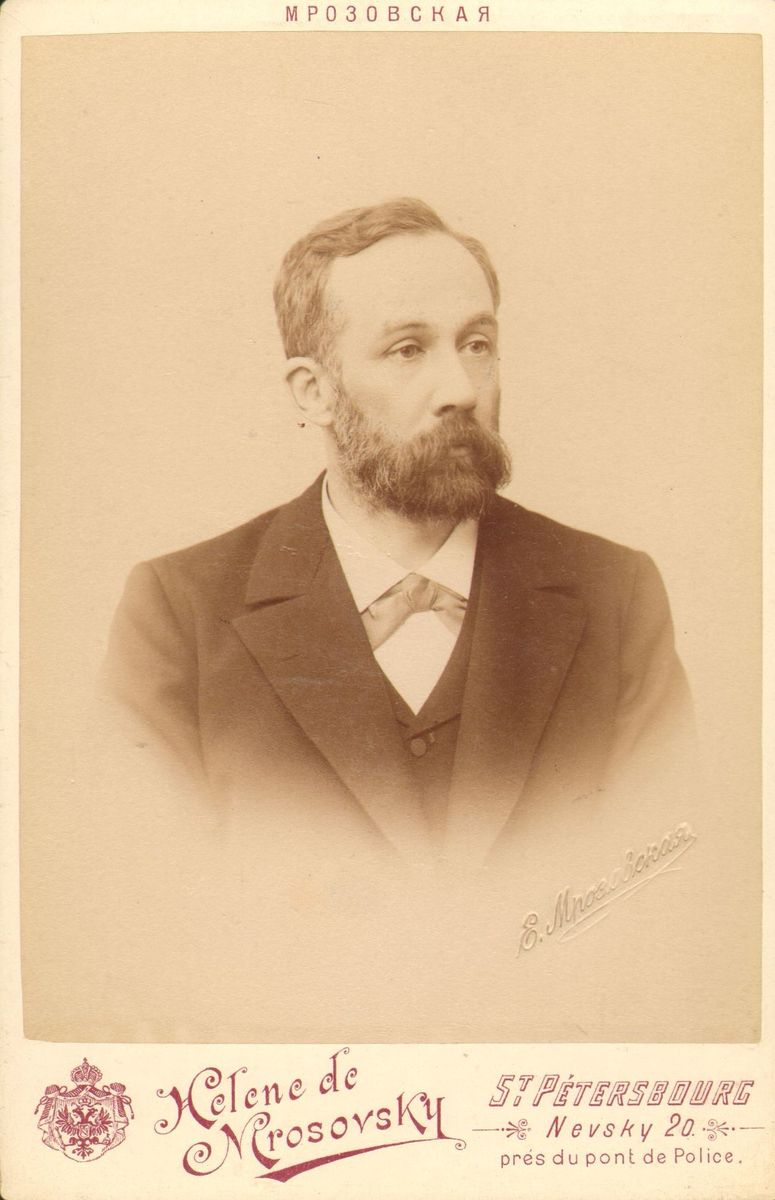
Volters around 1885

Volters was a prolific author. In total, he published more than 400 articles. In 1887–1902, he published articles in Latvian Dienas Lapa. In independent Lithuania, he published articles in such periodicals as ABC, Akademikas, XX amžius, Iliustruotoji Lietuva, Lietuva, Lietuvos aidas, Naujas žodis, Naujoji Lietuva, Naujoji Romuva, Praeitis, Trimitas.

=== Opinion on national identities ===
In an interview to Juozas Girdvainis around 1938, Volters claimed that he initially considered himself to be German. As a requirement to receive a large government research stipend, he presented himself as Latvian in 1884. In 1886, he married Aleksandra Maslauskaitė of Lithuanian nobility and his research began focusing on Lithuanian matters. At the time, Volters believed that both Latvian and Lithuanian were dying languages and cultures that should be studied but not necessarily encouraged or preserved. In 1886–1887, he published a couple articles in Vilensky Vestnik that fully supported the Lithuanian press ban and suggested methods on how to assimilate Latvians and Lithuanians. Further, he supported the idea of Ivan Kakhanov, Governor-General of Vilna, to convert Lithuanians to the Eastern Orthodox Church. In 1887, Volters translated into Lithuanian and prepared for publication Eastern Orthodox liturgy of John Chrysostom in the Cyrillic script. The idea was to distribute the book near Paberžė hoping that Lithuanian-language sermons would attract Roman Catholics and would persuade them to convert. The book was published, but it was attacked by the Eastern Orthodox clergy for the use of parenthetical synonyms for rarer words and terms (as they introduced ambiguity) and for the alphabet (he introduced new Cyrillic letters and borrowed a single letter j from the Latin alphabet to accommodate Lithuanian pronunciation). Thus the project failed and likely was a contributing factor for Volters to oppose the press ban going forward.

According to Girdvainis, Volters changed his opinion about the Lithuanian National Revival around 1888. During his expeditions to Lithuania to collect ethnographic data, Volters met many prominent figures of the National Revival, including Antanas Baranauskas, Jonas Mačiulis-Maironis, Aleksandras Dambrauskas-Jakštas, Aleksandras Burba, etc. He began treating Lithuanians not as an object of academic study, but as a living nation with aspirations for the future. He became active participant in Lithuanian cultural activities in Saint Petersburg by helping Lithuanian students, organizing amateur theater performances, sharing illegal Lithuanian publications (as a librarian of the Russian Academy of Sciences, he had free access to these publications), etc. Volters also publicly spoke out against the press ban, including a presentation to the Russian Academy of Sciences in 1887 and an article about the Sietynas case published in Sankt-Peterburgskie Vedomosti in 1897.

=== Ethnology and ethnography ===
In 1883–1884, Volters visited communities of Prussian Lithuanians in East Prussia and collected data about their language and culture focusing on customs and traditions surrounding baptism, weddings, and funerals. In March 1884, he presented his findings to the Imperial Russian Geographical Society and was elected true member of the society. Encouraged by the success, until 1887, he organized annual expeditions to various locations in Lithuania and Latvia (near Vilnius and Švenčionys, Samogitia, Suvalkija, Latgale) to collect ethnographic data. He published examples of folklore in Vilensky Vestnik and in publications of the Imperial Geographical Society. In 1887, he also collected biographical information about historian Simonas Daukantas and bishop Motiejus Valančius. In 1890, he published a valuable collection of 22 customs from Višķi and 70 Latgalian folk songs with their translation into Russian (Материалы для этнографии латышского племени Витебской губернии). While emphasizing regional differences, Volters wrote that Latvians living in three regions (Courland, Vidzeme, and Latgale) were indeed one nation.

Volters created and published several questionnaires to collect ethnographic data, including 50-question Program for Indicating the Peculiarities of Lithuanian and Samogitian Dialects (1886), 950-question A Program for Collecting Folk Spiritual Heritage (1892; prepared by students at the Saint Petersburg University under Volters' supervision), and 151-question Ethnographic Data about Latvians (1892; questions on Joninės or St. John's Day; published as in a supplement to Dienas Lapa). The largest questionnaire primarily dealt with the old Latvian mythology and religion, family and traditional customs, but also had smaller sections on geography and history, anthropology, dwellings, clothing, food and drink, occupations, language and writings. This program was reworked and republished by Pēteris Šmits in 1923. These questionnaires helped standardizing ethnographic data collections, preventing pseudo-scientific forgeries, giving direction to other researchers what to collect and how to collect to preserve authenticity.

Volters was a member of statistics committees. He edited archaeological and ethnographic articles published in a statistical almanac by the Kovno Governorate. He collected and published a statistical work on the inhabited localities in the Suwałki Governorate in 1901 (Списки населенных мѣст Сувалкской губерніи). He had similar information collected about Kovno and Vilna Governorates, but the information was not published and was lost.

In 1908–1909, Volters made the first audio recordings of Lithuanian folk songs (including from the Lithuanian colony in Dzyatlava). Some of the recordings were lost, but 113 wax phonograph cylinders with 165 works of folklore are preserved at the Berliner Phonogramm-Archiv (99 recordings) and the Institute of Lithuanian Literature and Folklore (14 recordings). In expeditions to make the recordings, Volters had several assistants, including Augustinas Voldemaras, Kazimieras Būga, Vincas Krėvė-Mickevičius. The recorded songs reflected the variety of Lithuanian music at the time – not only the valuable archaic folk songs, but also church choir songs, songs of youth gatherings, or examples of instrumental music (skudučiai, dūdmaišis). Following Volters' example, Jonas Basanavičius acquired a phonograph and made further recordings in 1909–1912. In 2012, 44 recordings by Volters were restored, transcribed, and published on a CD by the Institute of Lithuanian Literature and Folklore.

In total, during various expeditions, Volters and his assistants collected some 1,000 fairy tales, 300 songs, and 2,000 examples of other oral traditions (riddles, proverbs, jokes, etc.).

=== Lithuanian publications ===
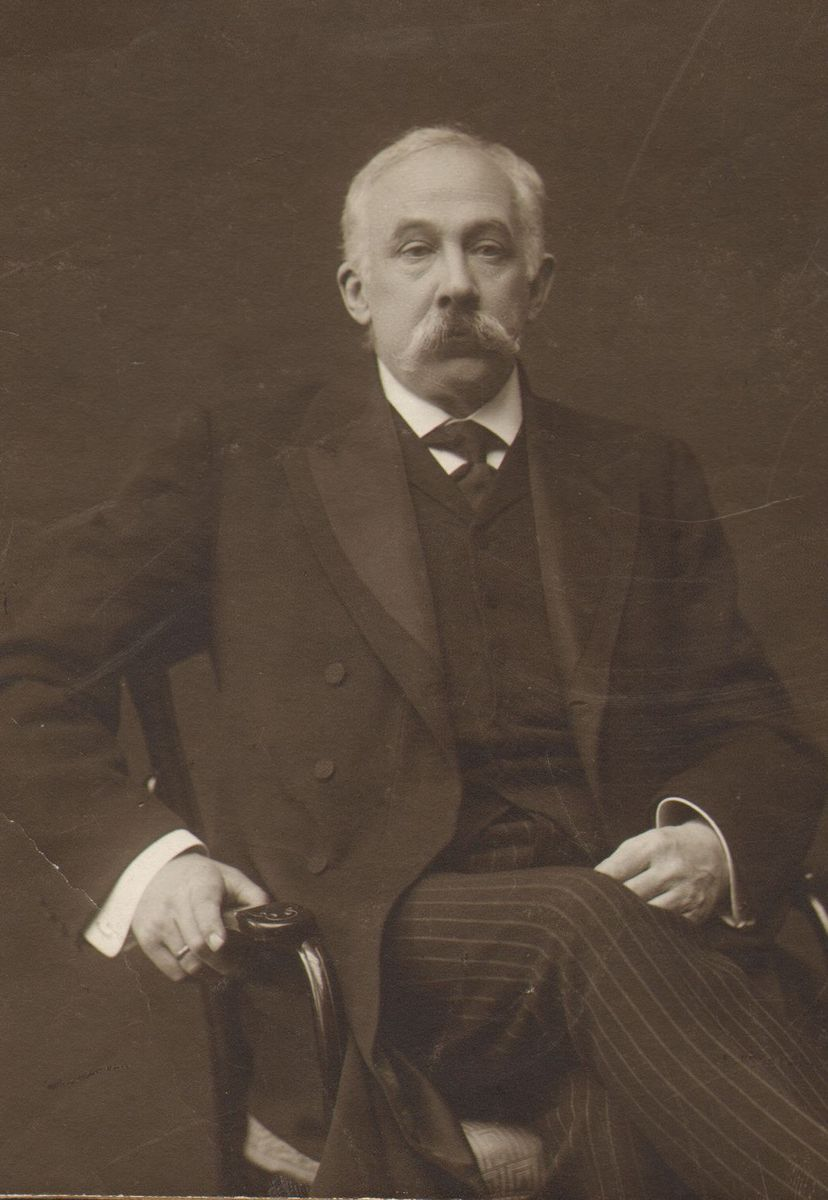
Volters around 1919

Volters worked on republishing old Lithuanian texts. In 1884, at the Vilnius Public Library, Volters found a copy of the Catechism, or Education Obligatory to Every Christian by Mikalojus Daukša, the first Lithuanian book published in the former Grand Duchy of Lithuania. Volters transcribed it and wanted to publish it with the help of the Russian Academy of Sciences. Due to the Lithuanian press ban, he faced resistance. Eventually, it was ruled that the press ban did not apply to purely academic publications and Volters was allowed to publish 100 copies of the catechism in 1886. The publication included Daukša's biography, review of the Lithuanian language research, dictionary of vocabulary used in the catechism, and examples of Lithuanian dialects that Volters collected during his expeditions. In 1898, Volters began to work on the publication of the postil of Mikalojus Daukša, a much larger and more substantial work than the catechism. Volters planned it for the 300th anniversary of the first publication in 1899. Together with Filipp Fortunatov, Volters published the postil in sections. The first two sections were published in 1904 and 1909. The third section was almost complete, but the outbreak of World War I prevented its publication. Volters managed to convince the Soviet Union to complete the third section and it was published in 1927. In total, 456 pages (out of 628) of the original postil were published. In 1901 and 1904, Volters published two volumes of Lithuanian Chrestomathy with excerpts from the oldest Lithuanian, Latvian, and Prussian texts, examples from 18th-century and early 19th-century writers (including Kristijonas Donelaitis, Simonas Stanevičius, Simonas Daukantas, Motiejus Valančius), samples of local dialects, and examples from the writers of the late 19th-century writers (including Vincas Kudirka, Žemaitė, Pranas Vaičaitis, Antanas Kriščiukaitis). The 612 copies of the first volume of the chrestomathy were sold out in two months prompting a second run.

Volters also worked on publishing other Lithuanian works that violated the Lithuanian press ban. He made a copy of the history of Lithuania by Simonas Daukantas and convinced Aleksandras Burba, then editor of Vienybė lietuvninkų, to publish the work in the United States. It was first published in Vienybė lietuvninkų and then in two volumes in 1893 and 1897. Volters also edited and prepared for publication the Lithuanian–Latvian–Polish–Russian dictionary (about 15,000 words) written by Mykolas Miežinis (1827–1888) and published in 1894 in Tilsit (now Sovetsk, Kaliningrad Oblast). In January 1904, Volters managed to get approval for a small publication (dedicated to the memory of Pranas Vaičaitis) of poems by Russian poets Alexander Pushkin, Mikhail Lermontov, and Aleksey Koltsov translated into Lithuanian. In April 1904, just weeks before the Lithuanian press ban was lifted, Volters petitioned for a permit to publish two Lithuanian plays. His request was rejected, but he did publish America in the Bathhouse (Amerika pirtyje) in 1905.

=== Archaeology ===
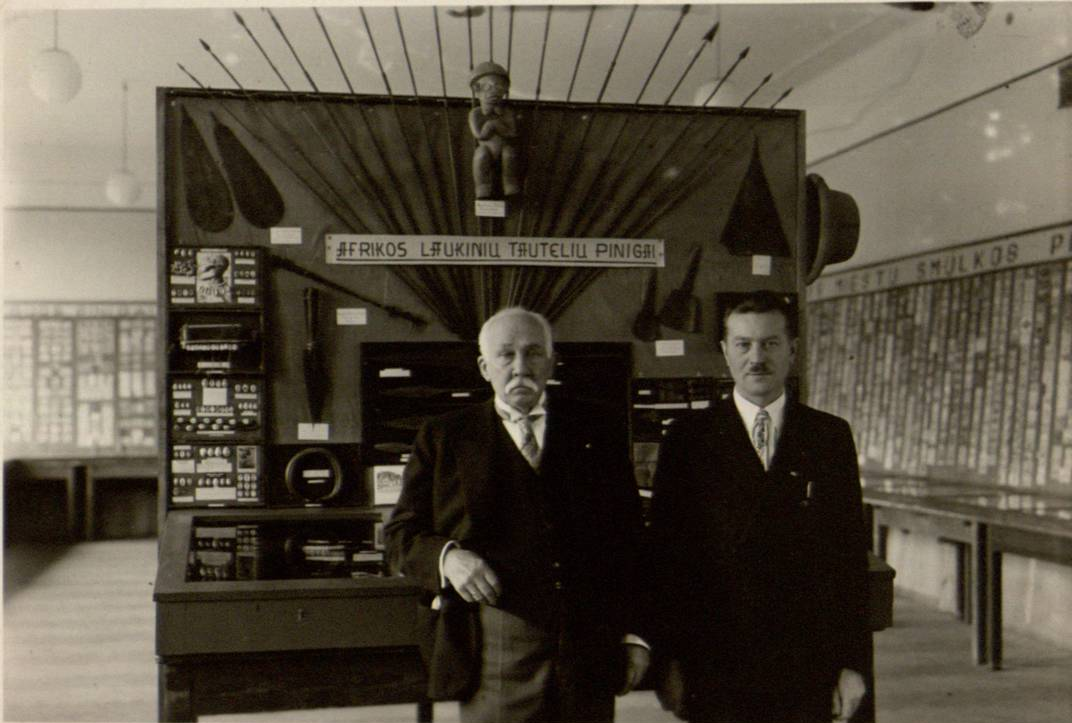
Volters (left) with Aleksandras Račkus in 1935

Volters was interested in archaeology. In 1887, together with Julius Döring, Volters identified the location of Apuolė, the first Lithuanian settlement mentioned in written sources. He also tried to locate Voruta, the presumed capital of King Mindaugas, and the site of the Battle of Saule. In 1888–1889, with funding from the Imperial Russian Geographical Society, he surveyed and excavated more than 210 tumuli near Trakai, Lida, Marijampolė, but did not publish his findings. In 1928–1929, Volters briefly surveyed Apuolė and, during a conference of Baltic archaeologists in Riga in August 1930, convinced Swedish professor Birger Nerman to organize and finance large scale excavations of Apuolė hill fort and tumulus in 1931. From the Lithuanian side, the excavations were supervised by Vladas Nagevičius. In 1930, in preparation for the 500th death anniversary of Grand Duke Vytautas, Volters supervised excavations and other works at the Kaunas Castle. Research at the castle continued in summer 1932. In 1932, together with Jonas Puzinas, Volters organized an expedition to locate Gotteswerder, a castle of the Teutonic Order that was destroyed in 1402. In 2000, Adolfas Tautavičius published a bibliography of Lithuanian archaeology that included 98 works by Volters though much remains unpublished and scattered among different libraries and archives. However, Volters' efforts in archaeology were not evaluated favorably by later archaeologists. Volters had no archaeological education and his methods were outdated, he did not have a systematic and disciplined approach to archaeological research, did not leave detailed reports on excavations, and published mostly popular science articles that frequently went off on a tangent instead of academic studies.
