= La Chapelle-Montligeon =

- Commune
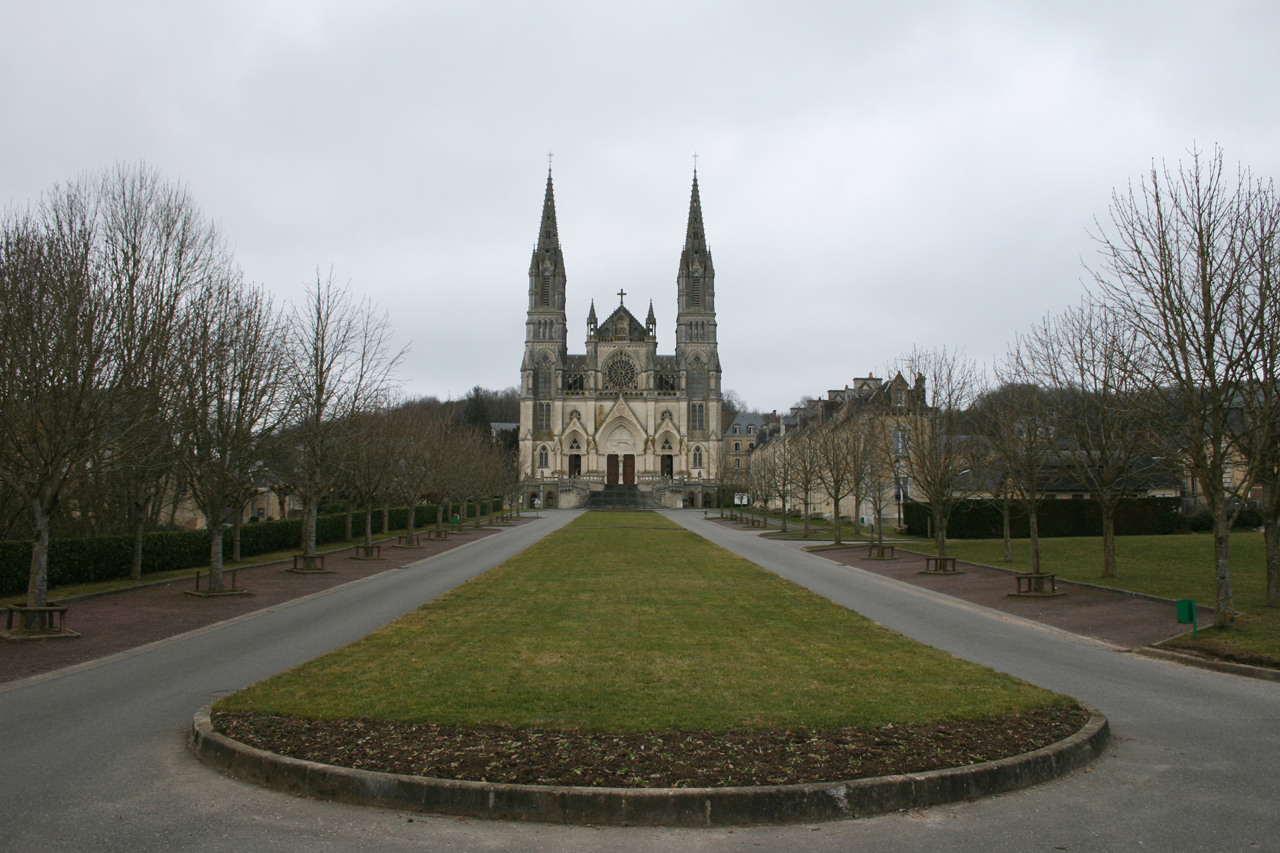
- The basilica church in Montligeon
- Location of La Chapelle-Montligeon
- Location within France Location within Normandy
- Coordinates: 48°29′03″N 0°39′15″E
- Country: France
- Region: Normandy
- Department: Orne
- Arrondissement: Mortagne-au-Perche
- Canton: Mortagne-au-Perche
- Intercommunality: Pays de Mortagne au Perche

Government
  - Mayor (2020–2026): Patrick Pasquier
- Area^{1}: 8.33 km^{2} (3.22 sq mi)
- Elevation: 215 m (705 ft)
- Highest elevation: 232 m (761 ft)
- Lowest elevation: 144 m (472 ft)
- Population (2023): 509
  - Density: 61.1/km^{2} (158/sq mi)
- Demonym: Montligeonnais
- Time zone: UTC+01:00 (CET)
  - Summer (DST): UTC+02:00 (CEST)
- INSEE/Postal code: 61097 /61400
- ^{1} French Land Register data, which excludes lakes, ponds, glaciers > 1 km^{2} (0.386 sq mi or 247 acres) and river estuaries.

La Chapelle-Montligeon (French pronunciation: [la ʃapɛl mɔ̃liʒɔ̃]) is a commune in the Orne department in north-western France.

== Geography ==
The commune is made up of the following collection of villages and hamlets, Beillard, La Picherie, La Haye, La Ronderie, La Chapelle-Montligeon, Le Courthenou, Les Goderies, La Sauvagère, L'hôtel Beaudrais and La Nicolière.

The Commune along with another 70 communes shares part of a 47,681 hectare, Natura 2000 conservation area, called the Forêts et étangs du Perche.

La Vilette river flows through the commune.

== Points of interest ==
=== National heritage sites ===
- Notre-Dame Basilica is a nineteenth century Neo-Gothic Basilica, it was registered as a Monument historique 1978. It features Stained glass windows by Louis Barillet.

== See also ==
- Communes of the Orne department
