= Tėvynės sargas =

Lithuanian-language periodical

Tėvynės sargas (Guardian of the Fatherland) was a Lithuanian-language periodical first established in 1896 in Tilsit, East Prussia during the Lithuanian press ban and the Lithuanian National Revival. It was published by the clergy and later by the Christian Democrats, thus it reflected and advocated for Roman Catholic ideals and values. Its motto was "All for Lithuania, Lithuania for Christ" (Lithuanian: Visa Lietuvai, Lietuva Kristui). With interruptions, it was published until 2000.

== First magazine in 1896–1904 ==
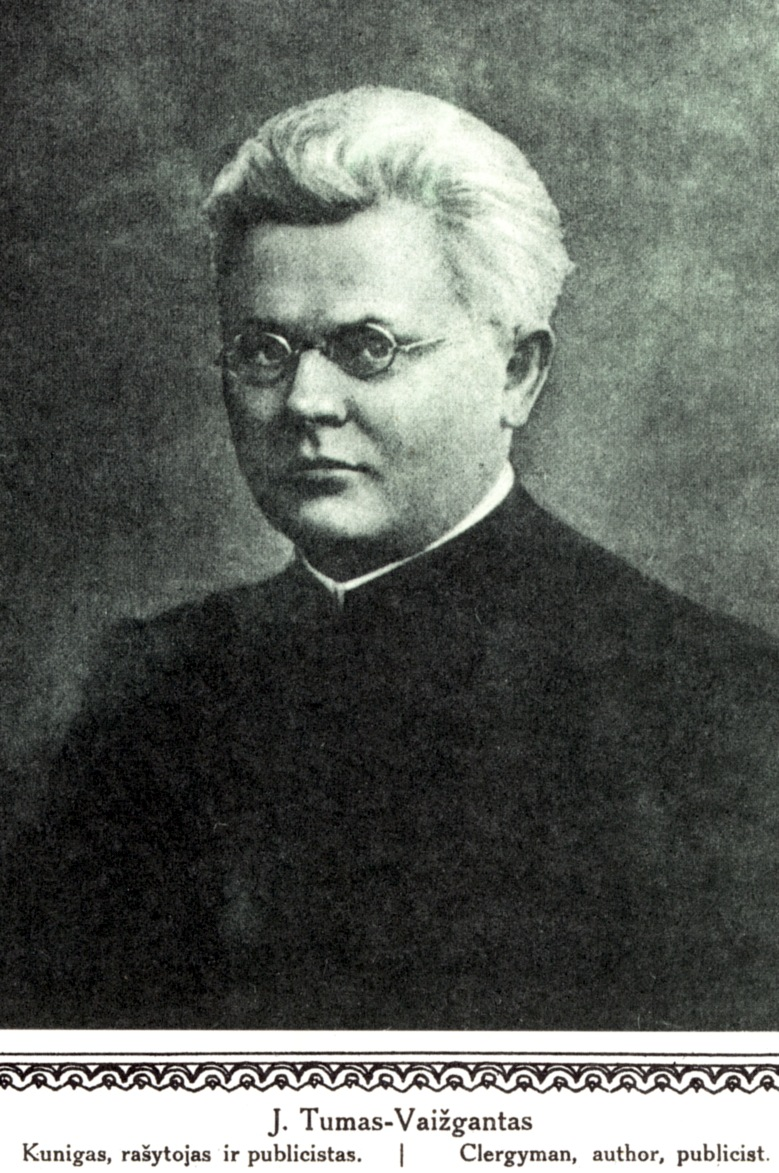
Juozas Tumas-Vaižgantas, one of the key people in publishing Tėvynės sargas, in 1921

Tėvynės sargas was first printed in January 1896 in Tilsit, East Prussia (now Sovetsk, Kaliningrad Oblast). Its staff was based mostly in Mosėdis (where Juozas Tumas-Vaižgantas worked as a vicar) and Kretinga Monastery (where several priests were deported due to anti-Tsarist activities). It competed with and quickly replaced more conservative Žemaičių ir Lietuvos apžvalga. The magazine, 32–60 pages in length, had a circulation of about 2,000 copies and was published monthly. Because Lithuanian-language press in the Latin alphabet was banned in Lithuania (then part of the Russian Empire), the periodical had to be smuggled across the border. Tėvynės sargas was published until May 1904 when the press ban was lifted.

Tėvynės sargas wrote on patriotic topics and defended religious and cultural rights. It advocated against various Russification policies, particularly the Russian government schools, and urged resistance to Polonization and promoted the Lithuanian National Revival. That presented a challenge as Catholicism was long associated with the Polish identity; the clergy needed to become less Polish without becoming less Catholic. The magazine thus criticized Catholic hierarchy, particularly in the Diocese of Vilnius, for supporting various Russification or Polonization policies. The magazine did not encourage political resistance against the Tsarist regime and in general accepted the existing social and political order. It also published more practical advice for farming and financial planning, encouraged commerce and learning a trade. It laid the ideological groundwork for the Lithuanian Christian Democratic Party established in 1904. From 1898, each issue had a supplement of literary fiction, popular science, or practical advice.

Its editors were Felicijonas Lelis (1896), Domininkas Tumėnas (1896–97), Juozas Tumas-Vaižgantas (1897–1902; reassigned to Vadaktėliai he was unable to attend day-to-day needs of the magazine), Antanas Milukas (1902–04). Officially, Jurgis Lapinas was listed as the editor as he lived in East Prussia. Its contributors included Jonas Basanavičius, Jurgis Bielinis, Kazimieras Būga, Liudas Gira, Motiejus Gustaitis, Jonas Jablonskis, Maironis, Šatrijos Ragana, Jurgis Smolskis Jurgis Šaulys, Žemaitė.

== Revivals ==
=== In 1917–1926 ===
The magazine was revived by the Lithuanian Christian Democratic Party in 1917. It was published weekly in Vilnius in 1917–18 and in Kaunas in 1920–26. It had weekly supplement Ūkininkas (Farmer; 1921–22) and monthly supplements Žvaigždutė (Little Star; 1923), Šeimyna (Family; 1923–26), Naujakuris (New Settler; 1925–26), Svirplys (Cricket; 1925–26), Jaunimas (Youth; 1925–26). It was edited and published by Aleksandras Stulginskis (1917–18), Stasys Tijūnaitis (1920–22), Juozas Andziulis (1922–24), Juozas Sakalauskas (1924–25), J. Dagilis (1925–26). Its noted contributors included Kazys Bizauskas, Liudas Gira, Justinas Staugaitis, Antanas Vileišis.

=== In 1947–2000 ===
The periodical was revived again in 1947 by Lithuanian displaced persons in Reutlingen and Fellbach, Germany. In 1950, the magazine moved to United States where it continued to be published until 1991. It was published in various cities, including Chicago, New York, Hot Springs, Arkansas and Euclid, Ohio. After Lithuania regained independence, it returned to Vilnius, Lithuania, where it was published by the Lithuanian Christian Democratic Party until 2000. It was edited by Domas Jasaitis (1968–75), Petras Maldeikis (1976–83), Algirdas Jonas Kasulaitis (1984–91), Audronė Viktorija Škiudaitė (1993–2000). Its circulation was 10,000 copies in 1992 and 2,000 copies in 1996.
