= Aleksandras Fromas-Gužutis =

Lithuanian writer (1822–1900)

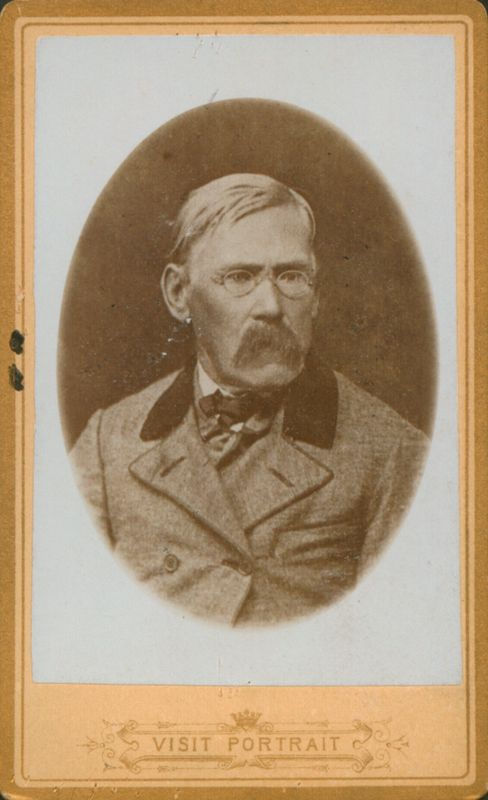
- Fromas-Gužutis in 1822
- Born: Aleksandras Fromas; 12 December 1822; Raseiniai, Vilna Governorate, Russian Empire
- Died: 21 August 1900 (aged 77); Gongailiškiai, Kovno Governorate, Russian Empire
- Education: Kražiai College
- Occupations: Farmer, writer
- Movement: Lithuanian National Revival

Aleksandras Fromas known by his pen name Gužutis (1822–1900) was a Lithuanian writer and one of Lithuania's documented first playwrights.

Born to a family of an office worker, Fromas received some education at the Kražiai College. He worked in various government offices until he purchased a farm in 1853 where he lived and worked until his death. Encouraged by his neighbor Mečislovas Davainis-Silvestraitis, Fromas began publishing his texts in the Lithuanian press in 1884. While he wrote three novels, some short stories, and poems, he is mostly known as the author of the first Lithuanian plays. Thirteen plays are known; four of them were published during his lifetime. Most of the plays deal with heroic and romanticized episodes from the old Grand Duchy of Lithuania. Other plays transformed traditional Lithuanian myths, including Eglė the Queen of Serpents and Jūratė and Kastytis, into literary dramas and dealt with realities of the 19th-century Lithuania, including the abolition of serfdom in 1861 and the Uprising of 1863. While the works are not noted for their literary merits, they become popular with the emerging Lithuanian amateur theater and had a strong influence on future writers and theater performers.

== Biography ==
Fromas was born on 12 December [O.S. 30 November] 1822 in Raseiniai to a family of an officer worker. His grandfather was a German who immigrated to Lithuania from East Prussia. His father died when he was seven and his mother had to support the family from her tutoring lessons. Despite financial difficulties, he enrolled into the Kražiai College in 1835 but was unable to finish. It is not known when he dropped out as his name is not found in the surviving student rosters. He found jobs at various offices of the institutions of the Russian Empire – at the land court in Raseiniai, at the office of Kovno Governorate, etc. In 1853, with the help of his wife's relatives, Fromas purchased a 60-dessiatin farm in Gongailiškiai (later incorporated into the Aušgirys village) near Girkalnis where he lived and worked until his death on 20 August [O.S. 8 August] 1900.

== Works ==
Fromas likely became interested in Lithuanian literature during his studies at the Kražiai College. For a brief time he lived and was likely tutored by Simonas Stanevičius, a Lithuanian writer and poet. At the college, religion was taught by the future bishop Motiejus Valančius. The college also had a strong drama troupe which likely introduced Fromas to theater. While he likely wrote earlier, his first work was published in 1884 after encouragement from his neighbor Mečislovas Davainis-Silvestraitis. Davainis not only proofread and edited the first texts by Fromas but also introduced Fromas to other Lithuanian activists, including Martynas Jankus, Jonas Šliūpas, Jurgis Mikšas, who were working on the prohibited Lithuanian press. Fromas published his works in various Lithuanian periodicals, including Vienybė lietuvninkų, Lietuviškas politiškas laikraštis, Unija, Nemuno sargas, Aušra, Lietuviškasis balsas, Apšvieta, Ūkininkas, various calendars. Many of his works were published after his death and a number of works remain unpublished.

=== Plays ===
Fromas wrote a few short stories and poems, but he is known as the author of thirteen plays. He submitted his first three plays in response to a literary contest announced by Vincas Kudirka in Varpas. The three plays were published in 1893. Though the plays are weak, they became popular among Lithuanians who organized cultural evenings with songs, dances, and amateur theater performances and had a strong influence on the future writers and theater performers. The plays can be categorized into three groups:

- Historical dramas that were based on idealized episodes from the old Grand Duchy of Lithuania:
  - Išgriovimas Kauno pilies 1362 m. (Destruction of the Kaunas Castle in 1362; 1893) about the Siege of Kaunas which highlights Lithuanian heroism and praises sacrifice for the homeland.
  - Gedimino sapnas (Dream of Gediminas; 1910) about the legend of Grand Duke Gediminas and his dream of the Iron Wolf
  - Vaidilutė, arba Žemaičių krikštas (Vaidulutė, or the Baptism of Samogitia; 1910) about the Lithuanian mythology and the Christianization of Lithuania in 1387 and 1413. It is a Christian-friendly reinterpretation of the events – Samogitians are portrayed as voluntarily choosing Christianity.
  - Eglė Naujapilės kunigaikštaitė (Eglė, Duchess of Naujapilė; 1955)
  - Vytautas Krėvoje (Vytautas in Kreva; unpublished) about Grand Duke Vytautas and his escape from prison in the Kreva Castle
  - Myris Keistucio (The Death of Kęstutis; unpublished) about the Grand Duke Kęstutis
- Mythological dramas that borrowed from the traditional Lithuanian myths and legends and added new details that brought them closer to the classical Greek tragedies:
  - Eglė žalčių karalienė (Eglė, the Queen of Serpents; 1893) based on the Eglė the Queen of Serpents myth
  - Palocius ežero dugnuose (Palace at the Bottom of a Lake; 1911) based on a local legend about a sunken palace in a local lake
  - Jūratė marių karalienė (Jūratė, the Queen of Seas; 1955) based on the Jūratė and Kastytis myth
- Works based on the contemporary life:
  - Ponas ir mužikai (The Lord and the Peasants; 1893) about the relationship between landowners and serfs before the abolition of serfdom in 1861
  - Baisioji gadynė (The Terrible Time; 1895) about the Uprising of 1863 though it failed to convey the suffering as many of the Russian soldiers who arrived to suppress the uprising are depicted as noble and polite showcasing Fromas' weakness in developing a conflict with an antagonist.
  - Gudri našlė (Wise Widow; 1908) is the only published comedy by Fromas. Russian state censors did not allow the play to be performed in Lithuania likely because it criticized Russian language lessons in public primary schools.

=== Other works ===
Fromas published three novels. Vargdieniai (The Wretched; published in 1893) has several independent stories and plot lines. Two of them describe the annual pilgrimage to Šiluva and a feast of beggars which describes their tricks and crimes. In some places, the novel verges on a satire. It provides some valuable ethnographic information about everyday life in 19th-century Lithuania. Patėviai (Stepparents; 1895) tells a story about a stepfather who plans to send his disliked stepson as a recruit to the Imperial Russian Army even though the stepson, as the only son, was exempt from the conscription. The stepson is saved by his teacher from the army. The stepfather leaves the farm to the stepson and pays for the stepson's wedding with a beloved. The novel devotes significant attention to wedding customs and therefore is a valuable ethnographic resource on traditional customs. Mūsų praeities ir dabarties paslaptys (Secrets of Our Past and Future; 1894) deals with the Uprising of 1863 and describes the barbarity of Russian soldiers, though does not have a more coherent plot.

Fromas wrote several short stories often noting that they are based on real stories. Literary critics note Seną pečių velnias kuria (The Devil Fires an Old Oven; 1893) which depicts a domestic family drama and is one of the first Lithuanian literary works to describe city residents (as opposed to villagers). In addition, Fromas wrote several articles and translated three parts of Dziady by Adam Mickiewicz into Lithuanian.
