= Liudmila Malinauskaitė-Šliūpienė =

Lithuanian poet

- Born: Liudmila Malinauskaitė; 14 February 1864; Ručiniai, Kovno Governorate, Russian Empire
- Died: 7 April 1928 (aged 64); Kaunas, Lithuania
- Other names: Pen names: Eglė, Aglė, Šarka, Starka, Pušė, Lietuvaitė
- Occupations: Writer, poet
- Spouse: Jonas Šliūpas (m. 1885)
- Children: 3

Liudmila "Liuda" Malinauskaitė-Šliūpienė also known by her pen name Eglė (14 February 1864 – 7 April 1928) was one of the first Lithuanian women poets. She published her first poetry in Aušra becoming one of three known women to have contributed to the first Lithuanian-language periodical aimed at Lithuanians in the Russian Empire. She was also a pioneer of Lithuanian amateur theater – her comedy Netikėtai (Unexpectedly) was published in 1910 – and an early advocate of women's rights. She spent most of her life supporting her husband Jonas Šliūpas and raising their three children.

== Biography ==
Malinauskaitė was the eldest of six children of a family of petty Lithuanian nobles of the Ślepowron coat of arms who owned about 300 hectares (740 acres) of land near Vaškai between the present-day Pakruojis and Pasvalys District Municipalities. Her mother died in childbirth when Malinauskaitė was 10-years old. Her father, who was almost 40 years older than his wife, died a couple years later and Malinauskaitė, as the eldest child, had to take care of her siblings. The children moved to Mitau (Jelgava in present-day Latvia) to obtain education. There is no proof that Malinauskaitė ever received any formal education though she knew Polish, Russian, and Latin and there are hints that she attended a school in Biržai for a few months. In Mitau, she met Jonas Šliūpas in 1879 and began writing poems and short stories. They became engaged in April 1884 but Šliūpas fled from the German and Russian police to the United States. It took more than a year for Šliūpas to bring Malinauskaitė to New York. They married on 30 September 1885 both in a civil and religious ceremonies held at the Capuchin Church of St. John the Baptist. They moved to a tenement apartment in Maspeth, Queens and she had to take a job at a Lithuanian-owned sewing workshop to earn a living.

Šliūpas' devotion to Lithuanian causes, severe financial difficulties, and cultural differences between peasant and gentry classes caused marital tensions. In early 1889, upon Malinauskaitė's urging, he decided to send her and their two children back to Lithuania in hopes that she could claim property that her parents left her while he studied medicine at the University of Maryland School of Medicine in Baltimore. Malinauskaitė failed to obtain the property and returned to the United States. Upon graduation, Šliūpas established a successful private medical practice in Pennsylvania where many Lithuanian immigrants worked at the local coal mines. Malinauskaitė was a Catholic woman, but supported her husband who became increasingly anti-religious and even refused to baptize the children. Šliūpas' family returned to Lithuania in 1920 and she devoted her time to family matters. At the same time, she had health issues (thyroid problems and appendicitis). She died in April 1928 in Kaunas.

== Works and activities ==
=== Poetry ===
Her first poem Broliams lietuviams (For Brothers Lithuanians) was published in the third issue of Aušra. It was a highly patriotic work expressing the importance of knowledge and education – a poetic retelling of Aušra mission. It was signed by her pen name Eglė. In total, she published eight poems in Aušra. In the United States, she continued to publish her works in Unija (1884), Lietuviškasis balsas (1885–1888), Vienybė lietuvninkų (1890), Naujoji gadynė. Her poems painted expressive and colorful scenes of nature, praised and idealized Lithuanian history and language (cf. romantic nationalism) as well as patriotic virtues (courage, brotherhood). Her later poems looked more into the future and expressed optimism that science and education will uplift the nation and eradicate poverty. Such poems are more logical and rational. Her poems on women's feelings (longing for a beloved who is far away, love, happiness, motherhood) separate her from her contemporaries. These more personal poems tend to be sentimental and naïve. A couple of her poems were written as responses to the conflict between her husband and the Catholic clergy.

She also published some short prose works that expressed the difficult life of women and that showed a clear influence of socialism. Her works show influences of Lithuanian folklore, Polish positivism, and earlier authors such as Antanas Baranauskas, Antanas Strazdas, Adam Mickiewicz. Malinauskaitė corresponded with Maria Rodziewiczówna and translated some of her texts to Lithuanian. Eight of Mailinauksiatė's poems were translated to Russian by Anna Akhmatova and published in 1962.

=== Other works ===
In early 1884, together with Šliūpas, she wrote and published a primer of the Lithuanian language. She worked to support her husband but was also active as a public speaker, both on Lithuanian patriotic topics and on women's rights issues. She helped organizing the Society of St. Anna, the first Lithuanian women's society, in Chicago in 1894 and the Society of Daughters of Lithuania in Scranton in 1904. She published articles on women's rights and children's education, encouraging women to get an education and a profession. She also worked on establishing amateur theater groups and organizing Lithuanian cultural evenings with music, dance, and theater performances. At the time, Lithuanians lacked Lithuanian-language works that could be performed on stage. Therefore, she wrote a three-part comedy Netikėtai (Unexpectedly) about a mother and daughter who fell in love with the same man. The comedy was published as a separate booklet in 1910. It is likely that she wrote more works, but most of her writings were lost.

== Family ==
Malinauskaitė had three children:

- Aldona Šliūpaitė-Jankauskienė (1886–1980), Red Cross volunteer, became a known gynecologist
- Kęstutis (Keistutis) Šliūpas (1888–1932), physicist, professor at Vytautas Magnus University
- Hypatija Šliūpaitė-Yčienė-Žiūrienė (1893–1987), married politician Martynas Yčas and engineer Pijus Žiūrys
