= Šliūpas =

- Lithuanian surname
- m.: Šliūpas
- f.: (unmarried): Šliūpaitė
- f.: (married): Šliūpienė

Šliūpas is a Lithuanian surname. Notable people with the surname include:

- Aldona Šliūpaitė-Jankauskienė (1886–1980) American and Lithuanian
- Jonas Šliūpas (1861–1944), Lithuanian activist
- Liudmila Malinauskaitė-Šliūpienė, Lithuanian poet, Lithuanian physician and public figure
- Mindaugas Šliūpas (1919–1979), Lithuanian basketball player
