= Freethinkers' Society of Ethical Culture =

Lithuanian society promoting freethought

The Freethinkers' Society of Ethical Culture (Lithuanian: Laisvamanių etinės kultūros draugija or LEKD) was a Lithuanian society promoting freethought active from 1923 to 1941. Chaired by Jonas Šliūpas, it promoted anti-religious policies in public life (e.g. established irreligious cemeteries and lobbied for civil registration). It published magazine Laisvoji mintis (Free Thought; 1933–1941) and separate books (mainly translated from foreign authors). The society considerably expanded after other political parties were abolished in 1936. Its secular outlook attracted many communists and socialists. It continued to expand after the Soviet occupation of Lithuania in June 1940, but was abolished after the German occupation in June 1941.

== History ==
Jonas Šliūpas established the first chapter of LEKD in Biržai in 1922. The society was officially registered in June 1924. Other founders included Leonas Vitkauskas, Peliksas Bugailiškis, Jonas Kairiūkštis. They established irreligious cemeteries (at least 12 such cemeteries were established; the first in Šiauliai in 1923, others in Kaunas, Kupiškis, Plungė, Kretinga, Girkalnis, Žagarė), lobbied for civil registration of births, deaths, and marriages (these events continued to be registered by religious institutions; the law on the civil registry was approved by the State Council, but it was not adopted), campaigned against compulsory religious education and submitted plans for non-religious schools (the customary religious education would be replaced by ethics, comparative religion, evolution, and eugenics). The society also organized lectures and cultural events, established reading rooms, published and distributed works promoting freethinking. The society organized three major congresses in Kaunas in 1932, Šiauliai in 1936, Palanga in 1939. LEKD encountered significant resistance and opposition from local priests, police, or government officials – for example, its publications were censored, chapters encountered bureaucratic obstacles in renewing registrations, members could not find premises for meetings and other events.

In 1933, LEKD had 25 chapters. The society considerably expanded with former members of the Lithuanian Popular Peasants' Union and the Social Democratic Party of Lithuania when all Lithuanian political parties were banned in 1936 by the authoritarian regime of Antanas Smetona. It also attracted members of the illegal Communist Party of Lithuania. In 1937, boards of local chapters included 49 communists, 34 populist peasants, and 14 social democrats. The society had about 150 chapters in 1938 and 2,143 members in 1940. The society and Laisvoji mintis sympathized with communism and Soviet Russia – the magazine often criticized Benito Mussolini and Francisco Franco, but never Joseph Stalin.

=== During the first Soviet occupation (1940–1941) ===
Unlike many other Lithuanian societies, LEKD was not abolished after the Soviet occupation of Lithuania in June 1940. In fact, it expanded to about 200 chapters. Some of its board members, most notably Mečislovas Gedvilas, became prominent officials in the new communist regime. It was abolished by the Provisional Government of Lithuania after the German occupation of Lithuania in June 1941.

In 1946, Justas Paleckis, Chairman of the Presidium of the Supreme Soviet of the Lithuanian SSR, suggested reestablishing LEKD to promote state atheism.

== Publications ==
Freethinkers published two short-lived magazines, Vaga (Furrow) in 1931 and Laisvamanis (Freethinker) in 1933, until Šliūpas became editor of the reestablished monthly Laisvoji mintis (Free Thought) in November 1933 (it was published twice a month from 1939). Šliūpas had previously published Laisvoji mintis in the United States in 1910–1915. He continued to edit the magazine up until the Soviet occupation of Lithuania in June 1940. The magazine devoted significant attention to science and printed many articles (often translated) focused on humanities, particularly history. At the same time, it printed reports of current events and various local incidents attacking and mocking the Catholic Church. Initially, Laisvoji mintis was apolitical and focused and cultural and religious issues. The society also published books and booklets – translated works by Marshall Gauvin, Robert G. Ingersoll, Otto von Corvin, Joseph McCabe, as well as works by Lithuanian authors (Matas Untulis, Alfonsas Žukauskas, Jonas Kairiūkštis, Vladas Dubas).
