= Vienybė lietuvninkų =

Lithuanian-language weekly newspaper

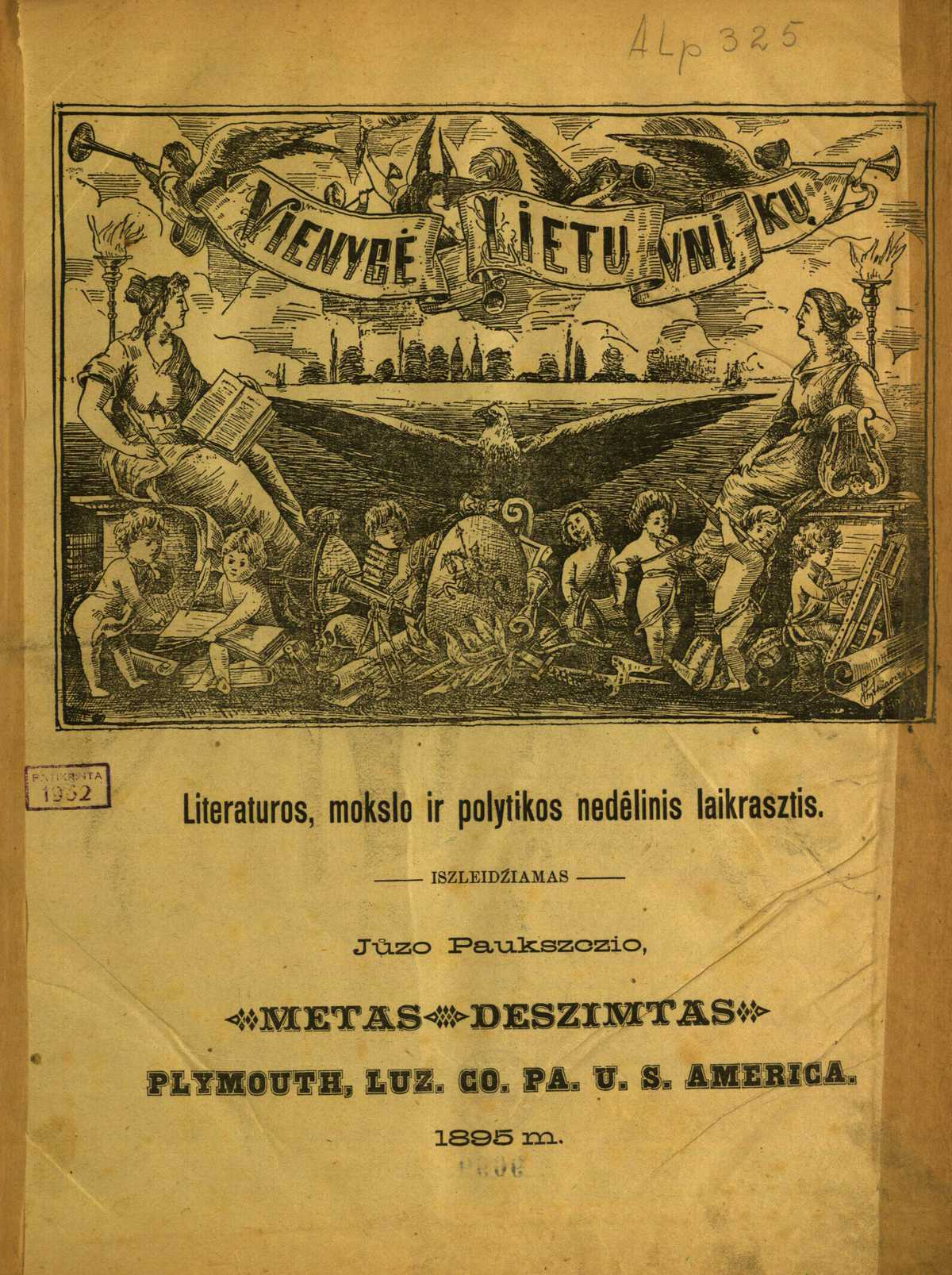
Cover page of the first issue in 1895

Vienybė lietuvninkų (literally: Lithuanian Unity) was a Lithuanian-language weekly newspapers published in the United States from February 1886 to January 1921. Established by two Lithuanian American businessmen in Plymouth, Pennsylvania, the newspaper changed its editors and political orientation frequently. Initially, it was a conservative pro-Catholic newspaper that supported unity among Polish and Lithuanian immigrants in the historic tradition of the old Polish–Lithuanian Commonwealth. It was a response to anti-clergy and anti-Polish Lietuwiszkasis Balsas published by Jonas Šliūpas in New York. Under the influence of priest Aleksandras Burba, the newspaper dropped its support of the Polish–Lithuanian union in favor of the Lithuanian National Revival and Lithuanian nationalism. Around 1896, the newspaper started shifting away from Catholicism towards liberalism and socialism. Attacked by the clergy as a "godless" publication, the newspaper suffered financial difficulties but the popularity of socialist ideas surged in the aftermath of the Lattimer massacre of mine workers in September 1897 and during the Russian Revolution of 1905. After the failure of the revolution, the socialist moods subsided and Vienybė lietuvninkų returned to Lithuanian nationalism. The newspaper relocated to Brooklyn, New York, in May 1907. It represented nationalism, or the third middle road between two main political camps – conservative clergy and liberal socialists. It continued to be published until January 1921 when it was reorganized into Vienybė, which continued to be published until 1985.

== History ==
=== Towards Lithuanian nationalism ===
The first issue was published on 10 February 1886 in Plymouth, Pennsylvania by two Lithuanian businessmen Juozas Paukštys, owner of several grocery stores, and Antanas Pajaujis, owner of an inn and a small bank. They each invested $1,000 (equivalent to $35,833 in 2025) in hopes of a profit, but Pajaujis left within a few months. Initially, the newspaper advocated Catholic ideas and unity among Polish and Lithuanian immigrants in the historic tradition of the old Polish–Lithuanian Commonwealth (cf. Polish-Lithuanian identity). It was a response to anti-clergy and anti-Polish Lietuviškasis balsas published by Jonas Šliūpas in New York. Vienybė lietuvninkų was the official newspaper of the Lithuanian Alliance of America (Lithuanian: Susivienijimas lietuvių Amerikoje or SLA). Its first editor was Domininkas Tomas Bačkauskas, who previously worked as an assistant editor of Polish newspaper Ojczyzna in Buffalo, New York. Bačkauskas established a section of humor and satire that became very popular and the newspaper had about a thousand subscribers and up to 4,000 total readers. After a conflict with Paukštys, Bačkauskas resigned in April 1888 and established his own newspaper Saulė in Mahanoy City, Pennsylvania. Bačkauskas was replaced by Antanas Turskis.

In August 1889, priest Aleksandras Burba arrived to Plymouth to establish the Lithuanian parish of St. Casimir. Under his influence, the newspaper dropped its support of the Polish–Lithuanian union in favor of the Lithuanian National Revival. Turskis did not support this new ideology and was replaced by Juozas Andziulaitis-Kalnėnas, the last editor of Aušra, in early 1890. Andziulaitis' views were much closer to Šliūpas' and the newspaper supported his Lithuanian Scientific Society established in 1889 in Baltimore. The newspaper also adopted more modern Lithuanian orthography and changed the spelling of its name from Wienibe Lietuwniku to Vienybe Lietuvniku. The shift also caused a split within SLA – Paukštys decided to leave SLA and establish the Lithuanian Catholic Alliance of America (Lithuanian: Susivienijimas lietuvių katalikų Amerikoje or SLKA) in 1890. Vienybė lietuvninkų became the official newspaper of SLKA, while SLA adopted Saulė published by Bačkauskas. Andziulaitis steered the newspaper towards democratic and even socialist ideas, publishing articles on workers' movement and critique of Catholic priests. He also published articles on literary and academic topics, which were of little interest to the poorly educated readers. The number of subscribers decreased from about 900 to 200. Therefore, Andziulaitis was dismissed in May 1892.

=== Away from conservative Catholicism ===
Burba invited Antanas Milukas to become the new editor. Milukas, a former student at the Sejny Priest Seminary, fled to United States to avoid the Tsarist police for violating the Lithuanian press ban. He was more steady and consistent editor, supporting both Catholic ideas and Lithuanian nationalism. He wanted to pay the newspaper contributors for their submissions to improve the quality and to attract more talent. To that end, he established a society that collected $5 (equivalent to $179 in 2025) per month from its members and paid for the contributions, firstly for those who lived in Lithuania. Milukas resigned as editor in August 1893 when he decided to complete his studies at St. Charles Borromeo Seminary. He was replaced by priest Juozas Petraitis. He published articles on the liberation of Lithuania from the Russian Empire, but avoided getting involved in political disagreements among Lithuanian Americans. He became ill and died in May 1895.

The new editor Juozas Ališius-Ališauskas lasted only four months. He was dismissed after printing a complaint from Lithuanian workers in Boston who accused a Catholic priest of stealing their funds. He was also accused of inappropriate behavior (shouting at press workers and abusing alcohol). He was replaced by Jonas Kaunas in November 1895. He was not particularly religious and pushed out Burba, who continued to have significant influence on the newspaper. Burba established Valtis and accused Paukštys of mishandling parish funds. At the same time, SLKA decided to establish purely Catholic Tėvynė. Therefore, the newspaper lost its Catholic character and began publishing articles on more liberal topics, including on capitalist exploitation and on the elections in the United States. Burba and other priests attacked such "godless" publication. The shift turned away subscribers and advertisers and, combined with a failure of bank where he held his savings, resulted in Paukštys' bankruptcy.

=== From socialism back to nationalism ===
In November 1897, Vienybė lietuvninkų was sold to Paukštys' relatives, but the new editor Petras Mikolainis continued its secular and nationalist ideology. After the Lattimer massacre of mine workers in September 1897, socialist ideas became more popular and Mikolainis, in collaboration with Jonas Šliūpas, published numerous socialist articles in Vienybė lietuvninkų. In January 1901, the newspaper hired new editor Jonas Mačys-Kėkštas who published more of works of fiction and managed to increase the circulation. However, it did not change its political orientation – Lithuanian nationalism mixed with socialist and anti-Catholic ideas. After Mačys-Kėkštas death in December 1902, Mikolainis returned for less than a year. He was replaced by Juozas Otonas Širvydas, a socialist. The popularity of socialism increased with the Russian Revolution of 1905. Širvydas became editor of Kova, official newspaper of the newly established Lithuanian Socialist Party of America, and was replaced by Juozas Baltrušaitis in April 1905. While Šliūpas, Širvydas, and Baltrušaitis were all socialists, there were disagreements on division of funds and on who should represent Lithuanians at the International Socialist Congress in Amsterdam. Such concerns overshadowed Lithuanian topics, such as the lifting of the Lithuanian press ban in April 1904.

In May 1907, Širvydas returned as editor and relocated the newspaper from Plymouth, Pennsylvania to Brooklyn, New York. After the failure of the Russian Revolution of 1905, the socialist moods subsided and Vienybė lietuvninkų returned to Lithuanian nationalism. It represented nationalism, or the third middle road between two main political camps – conservative clergy and liberal socialists. In the last eight years, the editors changed particularly frequently. The newspaper supported the Lithuanian National League of America (Lithuanian: Amerikos lietuvių tautinė sandara) and, during World War I, continuously urged donations to its relief fund aiming to support war-torn Lithuania.

Around 1918–1919, the newspaper suffered financial difficulties and was bought out by Širvydas. It changed publishing frequency to twice a month and was reorganized as Vienybė, which continued to be published until 1985.

== Format and content ==
Initially, the newspaper had only four particularly large (72 by 54 centimetres or 28 by 21 inches) pages. It was one of the first commercial Lithuanian newspapers – about 40% of the space was devoted to advertising. As a supporter of the union with Poland, the newspaper used Polish alphabet and Lithuanian texts were full of Polonisms. Under editor Turskis, newspaper's logo featured a handshake under a cross – a clear symbol of Polish–Lithuanian unity in the Catholic faith. The logo was replaced to show the handshake above the historical coat of arms of Lithuania surrounded by two flags (one unknown and the other of the United States). Editor Andziulaitis-Kalnėnas reduced the format to 33 by 25 centimetres (13.0 in × 9.8 in) and increased the number of pages to 12. He added a plain cover page that could be easily discarded so that at the end of the year all the issues could be combined into a book. Therefore, only the first issue of the year had a proper front page. In 1893, the newspaper adopted an elaborate logo that combined Lithuanian, American, and Lithuanian American symbolism. In 1896, editor Kaunas adopted a much simplified logo that retained only the coat of arms of Lithuania and remained unchanged for about ten years. In mid-1910s, the newspaper adopted a new logo that returned the handshake, but this time with a rising sun over the East River. In 1899, the newspaper adopted letters č and š instead of Polish cz and sz, particularly for serialized texts, but it took until 1904 to fully adopt this new orthography.

The newspaper published news from Lithuania (both republished from other newspapers and original stories by its own correspondents), from United States, from around the world (mostly Europe), and from Lithuanian Americans (including reports on Lithuanian parishes and societies). It also published works of fiction and more academic texts. Literary works included dramas by Aleksandras Fromas-Gužutis, poetry by Pranas Vaičaitis, the translated poem Grażyna by Adam Mickiewicz, short story by Maria Rodziewiczówna, and the play William Tell by Friedrich Schiller. More academic texts included history of Lithuania by Simonas Daukantas and Culture and Press by Emil Löbl. These large serialized texts were often later published as separate books. The newspaper helped organize protests in response to the Kražiai massacre of 1893 in Lithuania and Lithuanian exhibition at the World's Fair in Paris in 1900. It also sent a protest letter to William C. Hunt, Chief Statistician for Population, requesting to add Lithuanians as a separate nationality in the 1900 United States census. In 1903, it commemorated the 20th anniversary of Aušra by publishing memoirs of Jonas Basanavičius and Martynas Jankus.

== Editors ==
Editors Vienybė lietuvninkų of were:

- Domininkas Tomas Bačkauskas (1886–1888)
- Antanas Turskis (May 1888 – March 1890)
- Juozas Andziulaitis-Kalnėnas (March 1890 – May 1892)
- Antanas Milukas (May 1892 – August 1893)
- Juozas Petraitis (August 1893 – May 1895)
- Juozas Ališius-Ališauskas (May 1895 – October 1895)
- Jonas Kaunas (November 1895 – November 1897)
- Petras Mikolainis (November 1897 – early 1901, December 1902 – September 1903)
- Jonas Mačys-Kėkštas (early 1901 – December 1902)
- Juozas Otonas Širvydas (September 1903 – April 1905, 1907–1912, May 1920 – January 1921)
- Juozas Baltrušaitis (April 1905 – May 1907)
- Pijus Norkus (September 1912 – July 1913, July 1915 – February 1919)
- Juozas Gedminas (1913 – September 1917)
- Others in 1913–1921: Pranas Jonas Purvis, Vytautas Širvydas, Juozas Danielius, Romualdas Adžgauskas, Aleksandras Augūnas

== Bibliography ==
- Jonaitis, Marius (2011). "Vienybės lietuvininkų" istorija (1886-1920 m.) (Master's thesis) (in Lithuanian). Vytautas Magnus University.
- Krikštaponis, Vilmantas (June 15, 2011). "Degęs Dievo ir Tėvynės meile. Kun. Antano Miluko 140-osioms gimimo metinėms". XXI amžius (in Lithuanian). 45 (1925). ISSN 2029-1299.
- Misiūnas, Remigijus (2004). Informacinių kovų kryžkelėse: JAV lietuvių informacinės kovos XIX a. pabaigoje – 1922 m. (PDF) (in Lithuanian). Vilnius: Versus Aurius. ISBN 9955-601-39-6. Archived from the original (PDF) on April 14, 2018.
- "Wienibe lietuwniku : [laikraštis] / raszitojas D.B.J. Tomaszauckas". Nacionalinės bibliografijos duomenų bankas (in Lithuanian). Lietuvos integrali bibliotekų informacijos sistema.
- Prunskis, Juozas (1957). "Amerikiniai lietuvių laikraščiai". In Bagdanavičius, Vytautas; Jonikas, Petras; Švaistas Balčiūnas, Juozas (eds.). Kovos metai dėl savosios spaudos (in Lithuanian). Chicago: Lietuvių bendruomenė. OCLC 4267057.
- Raguotis, Bronius (1997). "JAV lietuvių periodika" (PDF). In Tapinas, Laimonas; et al. (eds.). Žurnalistikos enciklopedija (in Lithuanian). Vilnius: Pradai. ISBN 9986-776-62-7.
- Raguotis, Bronius (2008). "Lietuvių žurnalistikos istorija Amerikos lietuvių darbuose (iki 1904 m.)". Žurnalistikos Tyrimai (in Lithuanian). 1. ISSN 2029-1132.
- Subačius, Giedrius (2004). "Double Orthography in American Lithuanian Newspapers at the Turn of the Twentieth Century". In Baldi, Philip; Dini, Pietro U. (eds.). Studies in Baltic and Indo-European Linguistics. John Benjamins Publishing Company. CiteSeerX 10.1.1.693.3145. ISBN 1588115844.
- Wolkovich-Valkavičius, William (Winter 1998). "Endurance of Homeland Support by Lithuanians in the United States". Lituanus. 4 (44). ISSN 0024-5089. Archived from the original on August 6, 2019.
