= Lithuanian Scientific Society (United States) =

Lithuanian American society active in 1890s

The Lithuanian Scientific Society (Lithuanian: Lietuvių mokslo draugystė or LMD) was a Lithuanian American society established by Jonas Šliūpas on 22 December 1889 in Baltimore, Maryland. It was one of the first non-religious organizations among Lithuanian Americans and promoted Lithuanian language and culture as well as the Lithuanian national consciousness. The society published books and two magazines – monthly Apšvieta (Enlightenment, 1892–1893) and weekly Nauja gadynė (The New Era, 1894–1896). It was chaired by Jonas Šliūpas (1889–1891) and Ignas Bubelis (1892–1896) and was active until 1896. It was replaced by the Association of Lithuanian Patriots (Tėvynės mylėtojų draugija) established by Tamošius Astramskas and active until at least 1970s.

== Activities ==
The society was established on 22 December 1889 in Baltimore, Maryland. Ten people signed as co-founders of the society. Its first board members were chairman Jonas Šliūpas, vice-chairman Ignas Bubelis, secretary Simas Vencius, treasurer Jonas Stočkus, and librarian Marcijonas Radavičius. The society was initially supported by the Catholic priests and activists, as well as by the Lithuanian weekly Vienybė lietuvninkų.

In 1891–1892, the society had about 100–120 members who paid membership fees of $1 (equivalent to $36 in 2025) per month. Due to complains that it was too high, the fee was later cut in half. LMD also had local chapters. The first chapter was organized by priest Aleksandras Burba in Plymouth, PA in February 1891. Other chapters were located in Shenandoah, PA, Pittston, PA, Mahanoy Plane, PA, and Philadelphia – the coal mining towns were home of large populations of Lithuanian immigrants. In 1892, chapters were established in Marinette, WI, Mount Carmel, PA, Chicago.

LMD organized various events – monthly meetings, lectures (for example, about historian Simonas Daukantas, bishop Motiejus Valančius, linguist Georg Sauerwein, philosopher Voltaire; Šliūpas held 31 two-hour lectures on earth and universe, geography, biology, evolution in 1889–1890), protests against Russian Tsarist repressions in Lithuania in 1891 (three events held in May in Baltimore, Philadelphia, and Pittston) and 1894 (in response to the Kražiai massacre). LMD chapters also organized small local libraries of Lithuanians publications. The society held three congresses. One of the congresses was held on 24 November 1891 in Plymouth.

However, as the society spread anti-religious and freethinking ideas,It faced strong opposition from Catholic priests and activists. Thus the society began splintering and closed in April 1896.

== Publications ==
LMD published several Lithuanian books, two periodicals as well as two annual reports in 1891 and 1892. It also published and distributed postcards with the image of Grand Duke Vytautas. Since printing was cheaper in Germany, many publications were printed by Martynas Jankus in East Prussia. Its first two books were Lietuviškieji raštai ir raštininkai (Lithuanian Writings and Writers) by Jonas Šliūpas and Apie senovės Lietuvos pilis (About Ancient Castles of Lithuania) by Jonas Basanavičius. Bestiality of the Russian Czardom toward Lithuania (1891) by Šliūpas and Burba was the second English-language booklet about Lithuania written by the immigrant community. Out of 5,000 copies, about 1,000 were sold immediately.

The society published magazines Apšvieta (Enlightenment, 1892–1893) and Nauja gadynė (The New Era, 1894–1896). Apšvieta was the first Lithuanian magazine devoted solely to culture and education. It was published monthly (in total, 15 issues) by Otto von Mauderode in Tilsit and Martynas Jankus in Bitėnai. Its content was varied – Lithuanian topics, biographies, popular science, free thinking, criticism of religion, book reviews. However, it was not very popular due to Šliūpas' anti-religious and pro-socialist views. Nauja gadynė was published weekly (in total, 89 issues) and it was clearly a socialist publication that promoted proletarian internationalism instead of Lithuanian nationalism. The magazine published original and translated (e.g. by French Marxist Paul Lafargue) articles. Its official editor until August 1895 was Antanas Bacevičius, Šliūpas' brother-in-law, but if fact it was edited by Šliūpas.
