= Girkalnis =

- Town
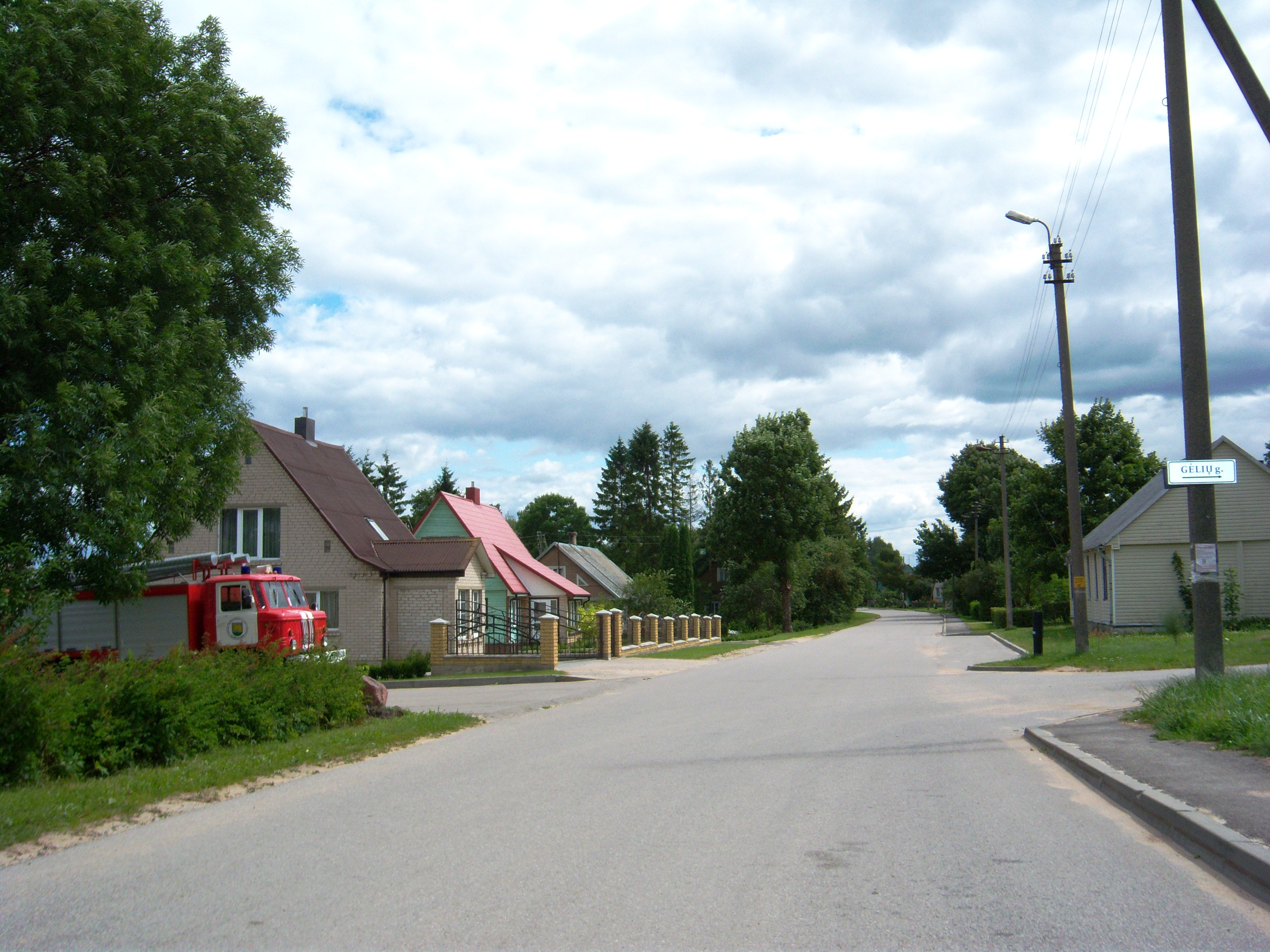
- Šėtupio street

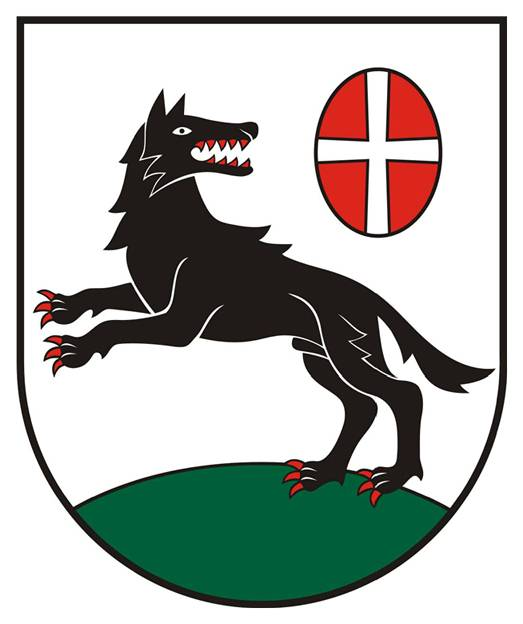
- Coat of arms

- Location in Lithuania
- Coordinates: 55°18′40″N 23°12′10″E
- Country: Lithuania
- Ethnographic region: Samogitia
- County: Kaunas County
- Municipality: Raseiniai district municipality
- Eldership: Girkalnis eldership
- Capital of: Girkalnis eldership

Population (2011)
  - Total: 877
- Time zone: UTC+2 (EET)
  - Summer (DST): UTC+3 (EEST)

Girkalnis is a small town in Kaunas County in central Lithuania. As of 2011 it had a population of 877.

== History ==
From July to September 1941, about 1,000 Jews from Raseiniai, Betygala and Girkalnis were massacred in the city. Those mass executions were done by Germans and local policemen in the context of Shoah by bullets.
