= Lietuviškasis balsas =

Lithuanian-language newspaper

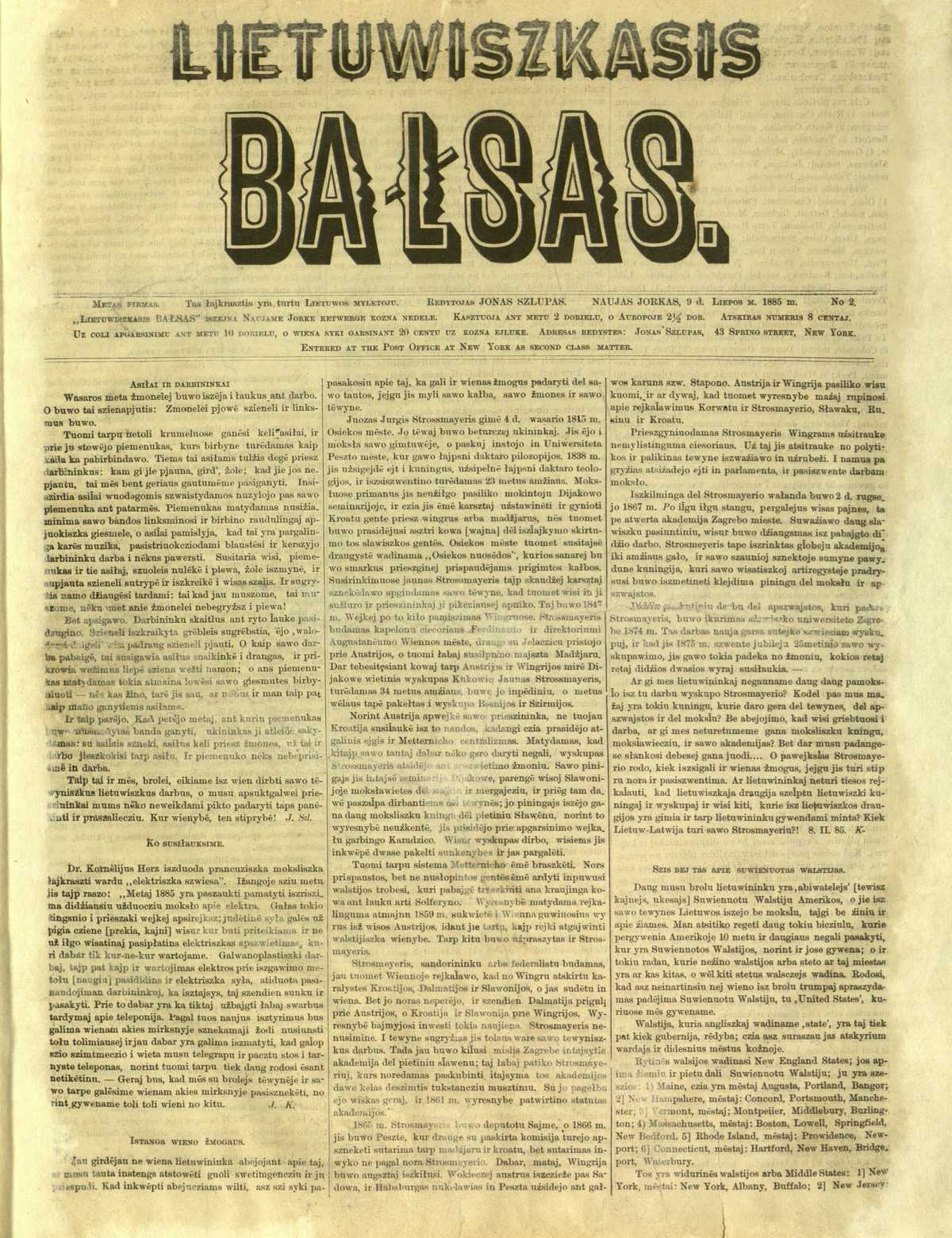
First page of Lietuviškasis balsas (1885, issue 2)

Lietuviškasis balsas (original spelling: Lietuwiszkasis Bałsas; literally: The Lithuanian Voice) was a Lithuanian-language newspaper published by Jonas Šliūpas from July 1885 to February 1889 in New York City and Shenandoah, Pennsylvania. It promoted the Lithuanian National Revival. Due to financial difficulties, it appeared irregularly. It competed with pro-Polish and pro-Catholic Vienybė lietuvninkų and was discontinued after 96 issues in early 1889. The competition and ideological debate between the two newspapers identified the two main branches of the Lithuanian movement – rationalist nationalists and conservative Catholics.

== Establishment ==
Šliūpas arrived to United States in June 1884. Together with Mykolas Tvarauskas, who owned a small printing shop and was the publisher of the first Lithuanian American newspaper Gazieta lietuviška, they established the Lithuanian-language weekly newspaper Unija (Union). Šliūpas' anti-Polish rhetoric elicited protests from local Polish groups and, in April 1885, Tvarauskas fired Šliūpas leaving him with no money or a place to stay. Šliūpas elicited help from other Lithuanian Americans, mostly sewing shop owners, who donated 250 dollars (equivalent to $8,958 in 2025) so that he could purchase a pedal-powered printing press and establish his own weekly newspaper Lietuviškasis balsas. At the same time, he established the Friends of Lithuania Society (Lithuanian: Lietuvos mylėtojų draugija) to support the newspaper and other Lithuanian publications. Its members paid $2 (equivalent to $72 in 2025) in annual membership fees. With a donation of $100 from Vincas Paplauskas, a Lithuanian owner of a sewing shop, the society published a collection of fables by Lithuanian priest Antanas Tatarė. It was one of the first original books by a Lithuanian author published in the United States.

== Content ==
The first issue of the newspaper appeared on 2 July 1885. It its first issue, Lietuviškasis balsas declared its mission to educate Lithuanians, promote Lithuanian national consciousness and unity. Initially, several Catholic priests, including Antanas Varnagirs who worked with Šliūpas on establishing a Lithuanian parish in New York, supported Lietuviškasis balsas. Initially, it was a small four-page publication, but later grew to about 8 pages. Šliūpas recruited collaborators, including Juozas Adomaitis-Šernas, Petras Vileišis, Vincas Kudirka, Petras Leonas, Juozas Andziulaitis-Kalnėnas. They criticized the oppressive Tsarists regime in Lithuania, promoted Lithuanian nationalism, democratic ideas, freethought, social justice. The promotion of Lithuanian nationalism brought the newspaper in conflict with Polish press which promoted the dual Polish-Lithuanian identity in the historic tradition of the old Polish–Lithuanian Commonwealth. The Polish press – including Ojczyzna (The Fatherland in Buffalo, NY), Zgoda (Harmony in Milwaukee) of the Polish National Alliance, Wiarus (The Old Soldier in Winona, MN) – considered Šliūpas to be a traitor and a Russian spy.

The newspaper published mostly long abstract and theoretical articles (often split between issues) that were difficult to understand for the poorly educated Lithuanian immigrants. Šliūpas' Samogitian dialect was difficult to understand for Lithuanians that mainly hailed from the Suvalkija region. The newspaper lacked coverage of current events or more relevant news. Šliūpas was the only one working on the publication – writing and editing its texts, printing them, mailing them out to subscribers – all the while financial difficulties often forced him to take random side jobs. Therefore, the newspaper was printed irregularly – out of 26 issues that were supposed to be printed in 1885 only 13 were actually published. Since Lithuanian-language publications were banned in Lithuania, some copies of Lietuviškasis balsas were smuggled to Lithuania.

== Disestablishment ==
In February 1886, two Lithuanian businessmen in Plymouth, Pennsylvania started publishing Vienybė lietuvninkų. In response to the anti-Polish Lietuviškasis balsas, Vienybė lietuvninkų advocated Catholic ideas and unity among Polish and Lithuanian immigrants. From the first issues, the two newspapers exchanged increasingly bitter and nasty rhetoric and accusations of destroying Lithuanian unity. As a result of this exchange, Šliūpas began publishing his first clearly anti-clergy texts. Lietuviškasis balsas raised the issue of Lithuanian unity and the need for a unifying Lithuanian umbrella organization. Šliūpas and 11 delegates of other Lithuanian societies established the Alliance of All Lithuanians in America (Lithuanian: Susivienijimas visų lietuvninkų Amerikoje) on 15 August 1886 in Shenandoah, Pennsylvania. The Catholic camp responded by organizing the Alliance of All Lithuanian Catholic Societies of America (Susivienijimas visų draugysčių katalikiškų lietuviškų Amerikoje) on 22 November 1886 in Plymouth. Šliūpas' organization disbanded in 1888 due to lack of members while the Catholic alliance, renamed and reorganized several times, continues to this day as the Lithuanian Alliance of America.

Competing with larger and better funded Vienybė lietuvninkų for subscribers and advertisers, Lietuviškasis balsas struggled and appeared irregularly (24 issues in 1886, 25 in 1887, 30 in 1888, and 4 in 1889; 96 issues in total). Hoping to increase the readership, Šliūpas moved from New York to Shenandoah, Pennsylvania, where many Lithuanian immigrants worked in local coal mines, in early 1888. The number of subscribers dwindled from about 500 in 1885 to 100 in 1889. Šliūpas' publicist work could not support a family of four. Therefore, in early 1889, he decided to close the newspaper and start medical studies at the University of Maryland School of Medicine in Baltimore.

== Bibliography ==
- Girnius, Juozas, ed. (1958). "Lietuviškasis Balsas". Lietuvių enciklopedija (in Lithuanian). Vol. 16. Boston: Lietuvių enciklopedijos leidykla. OCLC 977068241.
- Jakštas, Juozas (1979). Dr. Jonas Šliūpas (in Lithuanian). Chicago: Akademinės skautijos leidykla. OCLC 5223546.
- Jonaitis, Marius (2011). "Vienybės lietuvininkų" istorija (1886-1920 m.) (Master's thesis) (in Lithuanian). Vytautas Magnus University.
- Perrin, Charles C. (Summer 2013). Lithuanians in the Shadow of Three Eagles: Vincas Kudirka, Martynas Jankus, Jonas Šliūpas and the Making of Modern Lithuania (PhD Thesis). Georgia State University.
- Rhodes, Leara D. (2010). The Ethnic Press: Shaping the American Dream. Peter Lang. ISBN 978-1-4331-1038-2.
- Tapinas, Laimonas; et al., eds. (1997). "Lietuviškasis balsas" (PDF). Žurnalistikos enciklopedija (in Lithuanian). Vilnius: Pradai. ISBN 9986-776-62-7.
- Urbonas, Vytas (2012). "Lietuvių periodinė spauda: raidos istorija ir dabartis" (PDF). Gimtasai kraštas (in Lithuanian). 5. ISSN 2029-0101.
