= Jonas Šliūpas =

Lithuanian activist (1861–1944)

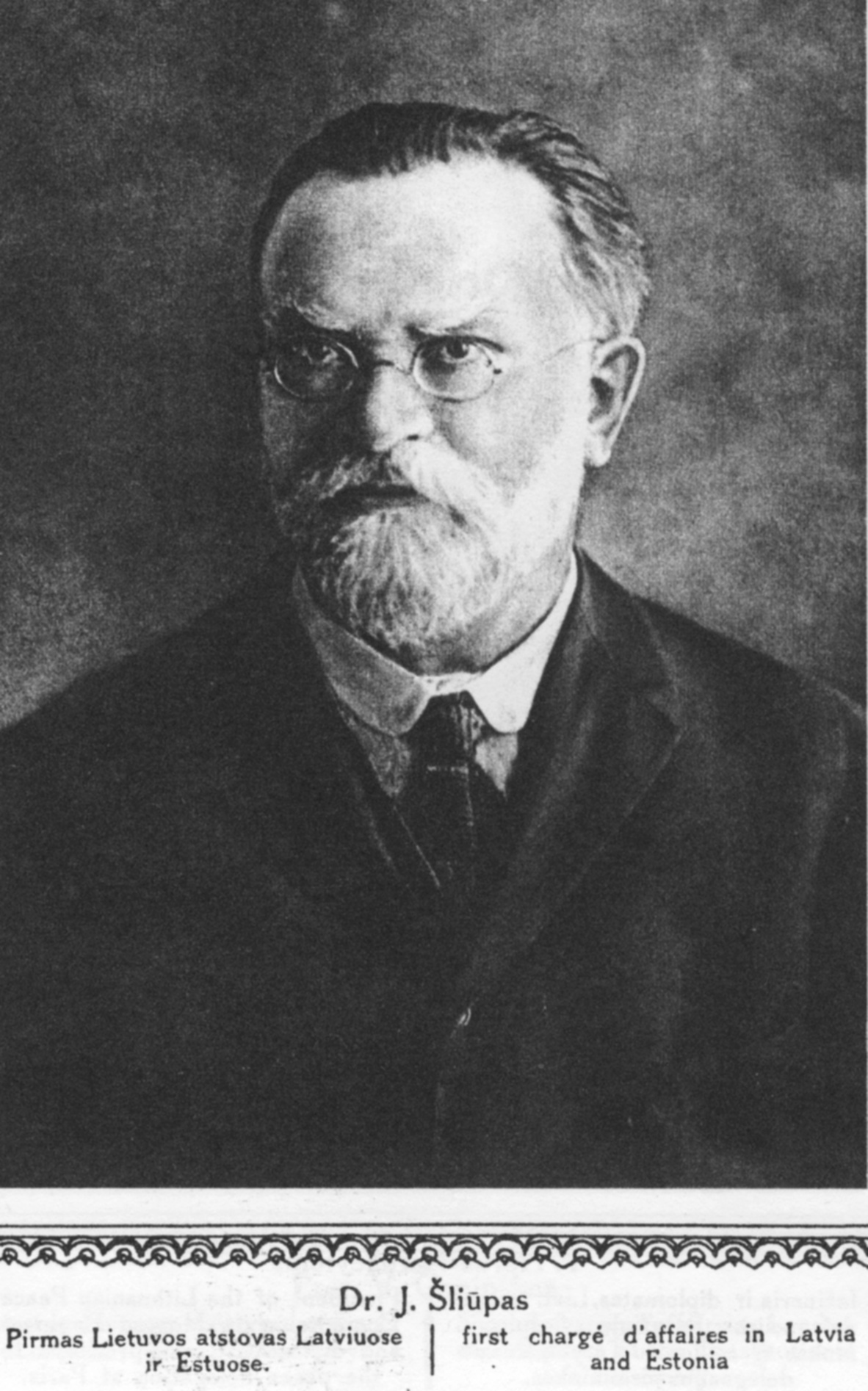
- Šliūpas in Lithuania Album published in 1921
- Born: 6 March 1861; Rakandžiai, Kovno Governorate, Russian Empire
- Died: 6 November 1944 (aged 83); Berlin, Germany
- Resting place: Lithuanian National Cemetery
- Other name: John Szlupas
- Education: Imperial Moscow University; Saint Petersburg Imperial University; University of Maryland School of Medicine; New York Post-Graduate Medical School
- Occupations: Newspaper editor; writer; public speaker; doctor; diplomat; businessman; teacher; university lecturer; mayor
- Years active: 1883–1944
- Employers: Vytautas Magnus University; Trade and Industry Bank
- Political party: Populist Party (1896); Socialist Labor Party of America (1900); Lithuanian Socialist Party of America (1905)
- Movement: Lithuanian National Revival
- Board member of: Lithuanian Scientific Society; Freethinkers' Society of Ethical Culture
- Spouses: Liudmila Malinauskaitė-Šliūpienė (m. 1885; died 1928); Grasilda Grauslytė-Šliūpienė (m. 1929–1944)
- Relatives: Rokas Šliūpas (brother)
- Awards: Order of the Three Stars (1932); Order of the Lithuanian Grand Duke Gediminas (1928, 1936)

Jonas Šliūpas (6 March 1861 – 6 November 1944) was a Lithuanian activist during the Lithuanian National Revival. For 35 years, he lived in the United States working to build national consciousness of Lithuanian Americans. He edited numerous periodicals, organized various societies, and published some 70 books and brochures on various topics. His sharp criticism of the Catholic Church made him highly controversial and unpopular among the conservative Lithuanians.

As a student at Mitau Gymnasium, Šliūpas read works by John William Draper that he later credited for laying the foundations for his lifelong dedication to freethought, promotion of science, and criticism of the Catholic Church. His studies at the Imperial Moscow University and Saint Petersburg Imperial University were cut short when was imprisoned for participating in a student riot in 1882. He fled to East Prussia where he edited Aušra, the first Lithuanian newspaper. He fled from the German police to United States in June 1884. Despite severe financial hardships, he began publishing Lithuanian newspapers Unija and Lietuviškasis balsas. Soon, Pennsylvania Lithuanians began publishing Vienybė lietuvninkų in response to Šliūpas' anti-Catholic and anti-Polish rhetoric. Šliūpas established the Lithuanian Scientific Society which was active until 1896. To secure means of making a decent living, Šliūpas studied medicine at the University of Maryland School of Medicine and started a successful private medical practice in 1891.

Šliūpas anti-religious and pro-socialist views grew stronger and louder. He published socialist weekly magazine Nauja gadynė (1894–1896), freethrought monthly magazine Laisvoji mintis (1910–1914), various mainly translated texts promoting freethought and publicizing the conflict thesis between Christianity and science, and texts on the history of Lithuania (including three-volume history of Lithuania in 1904–1909). He organized Lithuanian miners in response to the Lattimer massacre in September 1897 and during the Coal strike of 1902 and unsuccessfully ran in the elections to the United States House of Representatives in 1896 and 1900. He was a popular public speaker and by 1907 had given over 1,000 lectures on political, social, religious and scientific subjects. At the outbreak of World War I, Šliūpas organized the Lithuanian National League of America as the third or middle road between the radical socialists and the conservative Catholics. He organized fundraising drives to help Lithuanian war refugees, visited Russia in 1916–1918, and publicized the Lithuanian demands for independence in English-language essays and memorandums (one of them was added to the Congressional Record). In 1919, Šliūpas briefly represented Lithuania in London, at the Paris Peace Conference, and in Latvia.

While Šliūpas was respected for his past contributions to Lithuanian causes, he was not invited to the Lithuanian government or held a more prominent public position. Šliūpas returned to Lithuania in 1920 with substantial savings that he invested in the Trade and Industry Bank and other business ventures, many established by his son-in-law Martynas Yčas. Most of these investments were lost when the bank failed in 1927. He served as a mayor of Palanga (1933–1935, 1938–1939, 1941), a developing seaside resort, and had to coordinate the response to the great fire in May 1938 that left some 1,500 people homeless. He continued to promote freethinking – chaired Freethinkers' Society of Ethical Culture, edited reestablished Laisvoji mintis (1933–1940), lobbied for non-religious cemeteries, schools, marriage and birth registrations, published numerous anti-religious texts. He continued to be active in public life until his death. As many other Lithuanians, he fled from the advancing Red Army in October 1944 and died suddenly in Germany.

== Biography ==
=== Early life and education ===
Šliūpas was born in a well-off family in Rakandžiai near Gruzdžiai on 6 March [O.S. 23 February] 1861. According to Šliūpas' memoirs, his family told stories about their wealthy ancestors who traced back to the time of Grand Duke Vytautas (died in 1430). His uncle Aloyzas attended Kražiai College and later became a priest. His father owned 36 dessiatins of land and decided to educated all three sons. In summer 1868, his uncle Aloyzas took Šliūpas to live with him in Paliepiai near Betygala and later in Pernau. There, Šliūpas studied Russian and Polish languages and witnessed moral degradation of the clergy, even his uncle who lived with his housekeeper in sin and somehow managed to obtain large sums of money. He was beaten for various infractions and after a year and a half begged his parents to take him home. He was taken in by an uncle on his mother's side who educated him to pass the entrance examinations to a gymnasium. In 1871, he failed the Russian language exam at the Šiauliai Gymnasium. A year later, he passed the exams at the Kaunas Gymnasium but was not admitted due to lack of vacancies. While visiting Kaunas, Šliūpas received confirmation from bishop Motiejus Valančius.

Finally, Šliūpas was admitted to a preparatory class of the Mitau Gymnasium (present-day Latvia). He exhibited academic aptitude and, after finishing the preparatory class and taking exams, he was admitted to the 2nd class of the gymnasium in 1873 therefore skipping the 1st class. He continued to excel at his studies and received tuition waivers. He received financial support from his uncle and earned additional money by tutoring. For example, he spent the summer 1879 teaching noble children in a manor in Pandėlys. Though the gymnasium had only a few Lithuanian students and no Lithuanian societies, Šliūpas began developing his interest in the Lithuanian language, history, and culture. He read historical works by Józef Ignacy Kraszewski, began writing Lithuanian texts (translations of texts by E. T. A. Hoffmann and Thomas Mayne Reid), subscribed to Lithuanian newspaper Keleivis published in Königsberg, became a member of the Lithuanian Literary Society and contributed Lithuanian folktales to its publications. He also read Polish translations of History of the Intellectual Development of Europe and History of the Conflict Between Religion and Science by John William Draper which Šliūpas credited in his memoirs for laying the foundations for his lifelong dedication to freethought. He graduated the gymnasium with top grades in 1880 and continued studies at the Imperial Moscow University.

In Moscow, Šliūpas initially studied philology, but after one semester transferred to law. His good grades earned him tuition waivers. He met a small group of Lithuanian students who soon organized a Lithuanian society which published hectographed irregular Lithuanian newspaper Aušra (Dawn). In his memoirs, linguist Jonas Jablonskis claimed that this group inspired him to begin working for the Lithuanian causes. He also became interested in socialism, establishing contacts with Liudvikas Janavičius and Count Vladimir Zubov. Together with Janavičius, Šliūpas spent summer 1881 visiting various locations across Lithuania collecting funds to support members of revolutionary groups Narodnaya Volya and Black Repartition suffering from political repressions. In Moscow, he visited the Rumyantsev Museum, attended meetings of the Russian Geographical Society, listened to debates between professors Dmitry Ilovaysky and Fedor Korsh on the origins of Slavs. He corresponded with linguists Filipp Fortunatov and Vatroslav Jagić writing to them not in Russian, but in Lithuanian. In summer 1882, Šliūpas visited East Prussia to investigate the possibility of publishing a Lithuanian-language periodical – the printing of Lithuanian texts in the Latin alphabet was banned in the Russian Empire since 1864. He stopped in Kaunas and stayed with priest Antanas Baranauskas while he copied a manuscript by Simonas Daukantas on the history of Lithuania which was kept at the library of the Kaunas Priest Seminary. In Prussia, he met with members of the Lithuanian Literary Society in Tilsit (now Sovetsk), Lithuanian publisher Martynas Jankus in Ragnit (now Neman), and editor of Lietuwißka Ceitunga Martynas Šernius in Memel (now Klaipėda). Back in Lithuania, Šliūpas stopped in Žagarė to visit priest Ignotas Vaišvila to collect biographical information about Daukantas who lived with Vaišvila in his last years.

In fall 1882, Šliūpas transferred to Saint Petersburg Imperial University to study natural science. At the same time, hoping that the new Tsar Alexander III of Russia would lift the Lithuanian press ban, he prepared a Lithuanian calendar and submitted it to Russian censors. He also sent a petition, dated 7 November 1882, to the Ministry of Internal Affairs asking to lift the ban. Both requests were denied. He also worked to publish hectographed socialist manifestos and proclamations. His studies were cut short when he was implicated in a student riot, arrested, and imprisoned in the Kresty Prison for three months. He became ill and the police allowed him to return to his native Rakandžiai. There he wrote a biography of Simonas Daukantas (published in Aušra) and a socialist work on social inequality (attempted to publish in Geneva, but unfinished due to lack of funds; a copy was later kept by Vincas Kapsukas). In spring 1883, he was invited by count Nikolay Zubov to teach at his manor in Bubiai. He applied to different Russian universities in Kiev, Kazan, Kharkiv, Tartu, but was not admitted due to his prior arrest. Faced with conscription to the Imperial Russian Army, Šliūpas decided to flee abroad.

=== Editor of Aušra ===
In fall 1883, Šliūpas decided to leave to Geneva, Switzerland, which was a refuge for many Russian and Polish socialists. He had promises of financial support from Janavičius and Zubov as well as lofty hopes of establishing a Lithuanian press for socialist publications. He also wanted to finish his studies at the University of Geneva. Šliūpas established contacts with Polish socialist Bolesław Limanowski, began publishing his own socialist brochure, and wrote another brochure Išganymas vargdienio (The Salvation of a Pauper) in which he was the first to raise the idea of independent (not merely autonomous) Lithuania. The brochure was later published in Unija and as a separate booklet in the United States. Šliūpas did not receive the promised financial support from Lithuania. Searching for means of living, he rejected an invitation to join Narodnaya Volya and was about to emigrate to Chile to become a farmer, but received an offer from Martynas Jankus to become the editor of Aušra, the first Lithuanian-language newspaper published in Ragnit (now Neman) in East Prussia. On his way to Bitėnai, Šliūpas met with Jonas Basanavičius, who previously had editorial control of Aušra and who at the time lived in Prague. Basanavičius wanted Šliūpas to send all texts of Aušra for his final approval, but that was impractical. Basanavičius envisioned Aušra as a historical and literary periodical which would showcase the greatness of Lithuania's history, raise Lithuanian national consciousness, and promote education as means to lift oneself from poverty and oppression – i.e. promote romantic nationalism with careful additions of freethought not to alienate the majority Catholic population. In five months, Šliūpas edited twelve issues of Aušra. (Note: Šliūpas edited issues 5–10 of 1883 that listed him as the editor, issues 1–3 of 1884 that did not list him as the editor, and issues 4–6 of 1884 that listed him as the editor but were published already after he left Prussia. Several issues were published in one booklet – issues 8–10 of 1883, issues 1–3 and 5–6 of 1884.) He introduced some socialist themes to Aušra – articles promoting economic development with the ultimate goal of social equality, descriptions of poor conditions of peasants and manor workers, etc. This socialist tinge was enough to alienate the Catholic clergy who started treating Aušra with suspicion if not outright hostility.

When the Polish newspaper Dziennik Poznański criticized Aušra for its anti-Polish attitudes and separatism, Šliūpas engaged in a debate with its editors regarding the cultural and historical relationship between Poland and Lithuania. Šliūpas rebuked the criticism but expressed hope for Polish–Lithuanian friendship and cooperation. He published the letters in Aušra attracting attention from the German police which saw elements of Pan-Slavism. Suspicions further increased when Šliūpas and Jankus toured Lithuanian villages and called for the establishment of the Lithuanian Scientific Society. Its founding meeting in January 1884 was interrupted by the police. Eventually, Šliūpas was given 30 days (to 15 March 1884) to leave East Prussia. Using Jankus' passport, he returned to Lithuania.

Šliūpas visited Kaunas where he learned that Pyotr Shchebalsky, editor of the Russian edition of Dziennik Warszawski, raised the issue of the Lithuanian press in Congress Poland which included Lithuanian-inhabited Suvalkija. Šliūpas wrote a memorandum asking to lift the press ban and discussed it with several other Aušra collaborators in Marijampolė. Šliūpas was the only one who dared to sign it and bring it to Iosif Gurko, the Governor-General of Warsaw. The memorandum listed all the ways that the Russian Empire would benefit from lifting of the ban – lessening of the Polish influence and mistrust of the Russian government among Lithuanian peasants as well as the gained ability to control and censor legal press (the illegal press included many anti-government articles). The memorandum and by extension Šliūpas were later criticized for its sharp anti-Polish rhetoric. Šliūpas delivered the memorandum to a deputy of Gurko and, to avoid the police, quickly left to Mitau (Jelgava). There he got engaged to Liudmila Malinauskaitė, an orphaned daughter of a large landowner who Šliūpas met as a gymnasium student in Mitau. He felt being followed and spied on and tried to sail from Libau (Liepāja) to Germany, but the police found a missing stamp in his passport. Šliūpas then fled to Palanga and was smuggled by two fishermen in their boat to East Prussia. He traveled to Hamburg and on 28 May 1884 sailed to New York.

=== In United States ===
==== Editor of Unija and Lietuviškasis balsas ====
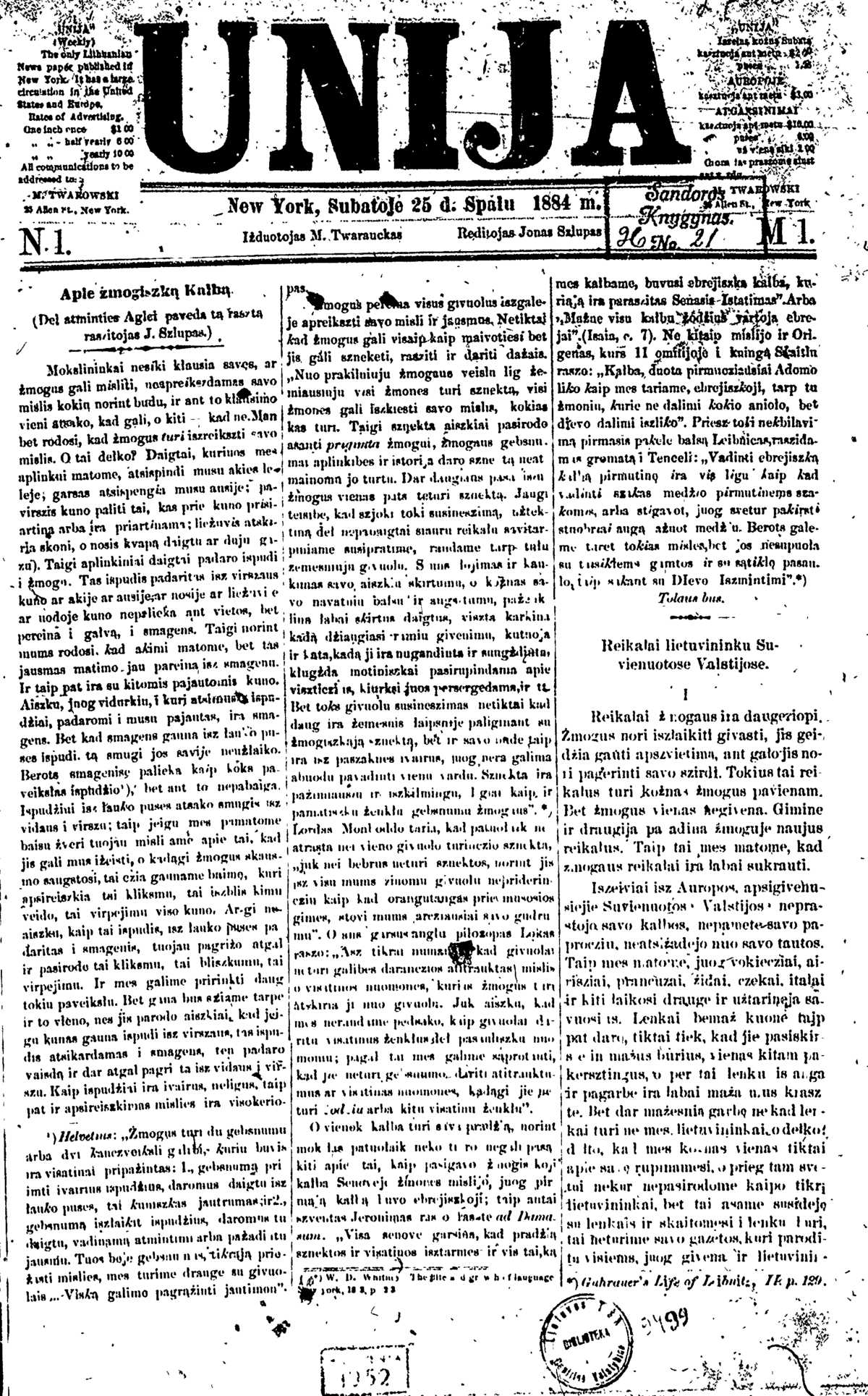
First issue of Unija

Šliūpas arrived to New York City on 16 June 1884. He did not speak English and tried assorted jobs for a few months until he established contacts with Lithuanian Americans. He met Mykolas Tvarauskas who owned a small printing shop and was the publisher of the first Lithuanian American newspaper Gazieta lietuviška in 1879–1880. Together they established the Lithuanian-language weekly newspaper Unija (Union). Initially, the idea was to publish the newspaper both in Polish and Lithuanian, but they could not get enough Polish subscribers due to Šliūpas' focus on the Lithuanian National Revival. The first issue was published on 25 October 1884. It was a small four-page publication that mainly printed Šliūpas' texts that focused on Lithuania's revival, promoted a union with Latvia, discussed children's education, advanced freethinking and socialist ideas. It also published the first poems by Šliūpas' fiancé who stayed behind in Mitau. At the end of 1884, the newspaper had just 250 subscribers. Šliūpas lived together with Tvarauskas in the same room as the printing press – the conditions were very poor and cramped. At the same time, Šliūpas joined the Mutual Aid Society of Saint Casimir at the Polish St. Stanislaus Bishop and Martyr Church and started working on organizing a separate Lithuanian parish to combat Polonization via churches. In April 1885, a Polish committee invited Lithuanians to participate in a parade and fundraising celebrating the Constitution of 3 May 1791. Šliūpas responded in Unija calling Lithuanians to reject the invitation as it was a Polish, not a Lithuanian celebration. This elicited protests from Polish groups as well as from within the Mutual Aid Society of Saint Casimir and, on 27 April, Tvarauskas fired Šliūpas leaving him with no money or a place to stay.

Šliūpas elicited help from other Lithuanian Americans who donated 250 dollars (equivalent to $8,958 in 2025) so that he could purchase a pedal-powered printing press and establish his own weekly newspaper Lietuviškasis balsas (The Lithuanian Voice). At the same time he established the Friends of Lithuania Society (Lithuanian: Lietuvos mylėtojų draugija) to publish the newspaper and other Lithuanian publications. The first issue of the newspaper appeared on 2 July 1885. It printed mostly long abstract and theoretical articles that were difficult to understand for the poorly educated Lithuanian immigrants. Additionally, Šliūpas' Samogitian dialect was difficult to understand for Lithuanians that mainly hailed from the Suvalkija region. Šliūpas was the only one working on the publication all the while severe financial difficulties often forced him to take random side jobs. Therefore, the newspaper was printed irregularly – out of 26 issues that were supposed to be printed in 1885 only 13 were actually published.

Despite the difficulties, Šliūpas continued to organize a separate Lithuanian parish and invited priest Antanas Varnagiris from Independence, Wisconsin, who arrived in June 1885. They managed to get a confirmation from the Archbishop of New York that Varnagiris would be separated from Polish priests, but due to disagreements Šliūpas withdrew from the parish. Šliūpas wanted to keep parishes independent afraid that American bishops could easily close or transfer Lithuanian churches. Varnagiris preached to Lithuanians in a Polish church until early 1886 when he moved to a Polish–Lithuanian parish in Freeland, Pennsylvania. Šliūpas also participated in many Lithuanian events, delivering lively speeches and lectures which became more popular than his newspaper. He brought his fiancé Malinauskaitė to New York and they married on 30 September 1885 both in a civil and religious ceremonies (held at the Capuchin Church of St. John the Baptist). They moved to a tenement apartment in Maspeth, Queens and she got a job at a Lithuanian-owned sewing workshop.

==== Fight with Vienybė lietuvninkų ====
In February 1886, two Lithuanian businessmen in Plymouth, Pennsylvania started publishing Vienybė lietuvninkų which advocated Catholic ideas and unity among Polish and Lithuanian immigrants in the historic tradition of the old Polish–Lithuanian Commonwealth in response to anti-clergy and anti-Polish Lietuviškasis balsas. From the first issues, the two newspapers exchanged increasingly bitter and nasty rhetoric and accusations of destroying Lithuanian unity. Šliūpas and 11 delegates of other Lithuanian societies established the Alliance of All Lithuanians in America (Lithuanian: Susivienijimas visų lietuvninkų Amerikoje) on 15 August 1886 in Shenandoah, Pennsylvania, with a goal to unite all Lithuanians under an umbrella organization. The Catholic camp responded by organizing the Alliance of All Lithuanian Catholic Societies of America (Susivienijimas visų draugysčių katalikiškų lietuviškų Amerikoje) on 22 November 1886 in Plymouth. Šliūpas' organization disbanded in 1888 due to lack of members while the Catholic alliance, renamed and reorganized several times, continues to this day as the Lithuanian Alliance of America.

In 1887, faced with constant criticism and attacks, Šliūpas published a Polish-language brochure Litwini i Polacy (Lithuanians and Poles) to explain his ideology on the Polish–Lithuanian question. In this work, he cited the Marxist slogan "Proletarians of all countries, unite!" but did not adopt the concept of class struggle. Loosely interpreting the history of Lithuania, he denounced the exploitation of the Lithuanian people by Polish nobility and Catholic clergy concluding that Lithuania wants to be politically independent. He also translated and published Patkulis, a historical-political drama by the German writer Karl Gutzkow about Johann Patkul, a Livonian nobleman and an instigator of the Great Northern War (1700–1721), who was portrayed as a Latvian fighting for his nation's freedom. He further published a history of Lithuania written by Konstancja Skirmuntt and translated by Petras Vileišis.

Competing with Vienybė lietuvninkų for subscribers and advertisers, Lietuviškasis balsas struggled and appeared irregularly. Hoping to increase the readership, Šliūpas moved from New York to Shenandoah, Pennsylvania, where many Lithuanian immigrants worked in local coal mines, in early 1888. In Shenandoah, Šliūpas established weekend education courses for adults and agitated locals to invite priest Aleksandras Burba, former collaborator in Aušra, to establish the Lithuanian parish of St. Casimir. Burba arrived to Plymouth in August 1889 and became a friend and collaborator with Šliūpas. Šliūpas' publicist work could not support a family of four (daughter born in July 1886 and son born in March 1888). Therefore, in early 1889, he decided to study medicine at the University of Maryland School of Medicine in Baltimore. As a student, Šliūpas struggled financially, earning some money by selling cigars and getting some aid from Burba, but did not abandon public life.

==== Founder of the Lithuanian Scientific Society ====
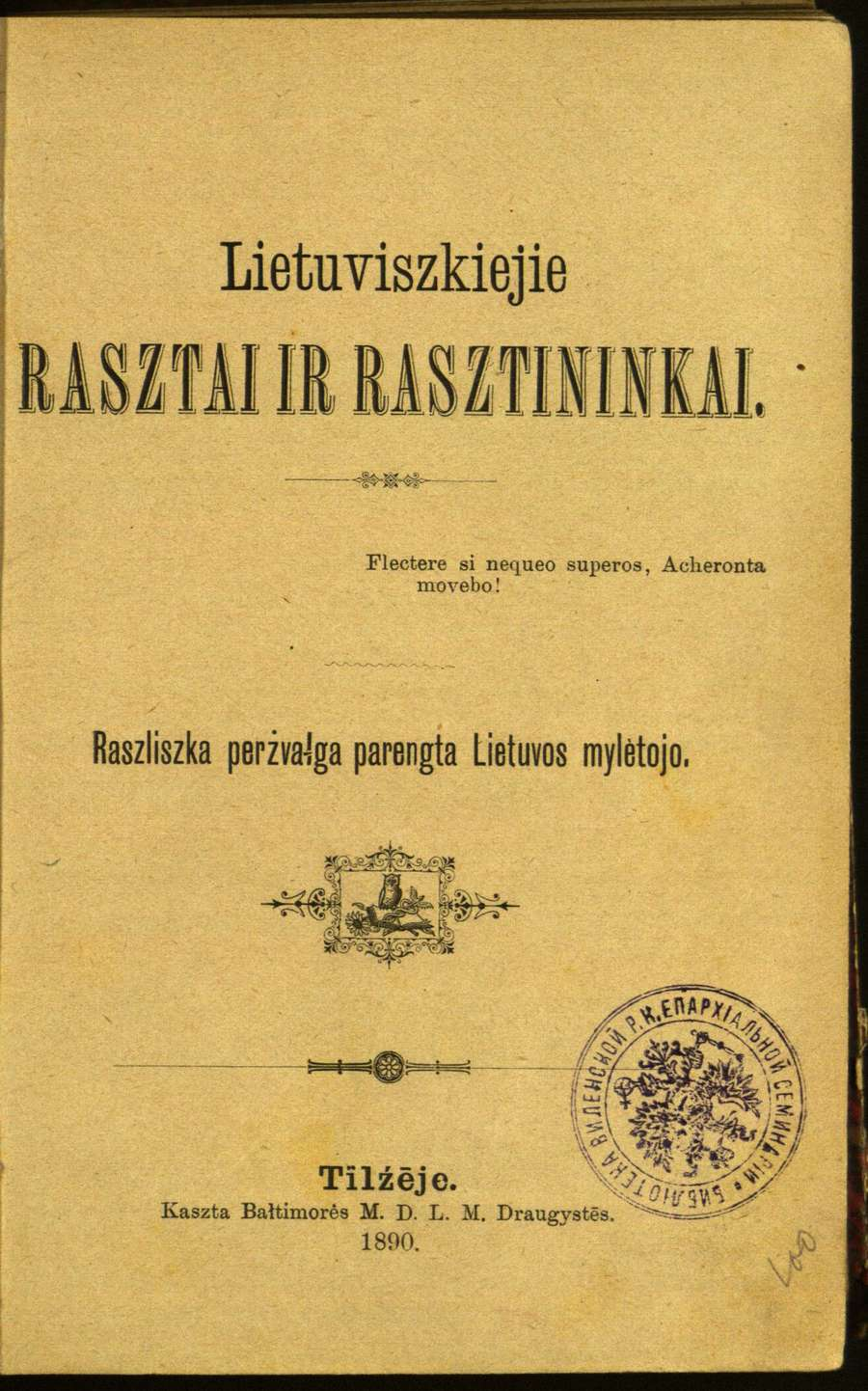
Title page of Lietuviškieji raštai ir raštininkai (Lithuanian Texts and Writers) published in 1890

On 22 December 1889, Šliūpas established the Lithuanian Scientific Society (Lietuvių mokslo draugystė) in Baltimore and became its chairman. The primary goal of the society was to publish Lithuanian texts and otherwise promote education among Lithuanians. Its first publication was Šliūpas' work on Lithuanian-language texts from the 16th century to present published in 1890 in Tilsit, East Prussia. (Note: Printing in East Prussia was cheaper and thus a rather popular option for publishing books and periodicals for Lithuanian Americans.) It contained mostly patriotic and nationalistic excerpts from older texts with essays by Šliūpas on the current situation of and future hopes for the Lithuanian National Revival, and thus were more a like a chrestomathy than a proper history of Lithuanian literature. In 1891, together with Burba, Šliūpas published Bestiality of the Russian Czardom toward Lithuania, the second English-language publication by the Lithuanian immigrant community. Šliūpas also delivered speeches and lectures on various topics from Darwinism and religion to socialism. In winter 1889–1890, he delivered about 30 such speeches. One of the lectures on Lithuania's past, present, and future was developed and published as a separate brochure in 1897. In March 1892, the Scientific Society began publishing monthly magazine Apšvieta (Enlightenment). It was the first Lithuanian magazine devoted solely to culture and education. In total, 15 issues were published in Tilsit, East Prussia. Edited by Šliūpas, the magazine could not avoid his anti-religious and pro-socialist views.

Šliūpas became a naturalized citizen of the United States on 3 June 1890. He graduated with a medical degree in March 1891. He further graduated from the New York Post-Graduate Medical School in April 1901. He opened a private medical practice in Wilkes-Barre but quickly returned to Baltimore and moved to Shenandoah in spring 1892. In 1892, Vladislovas Dembskis, a former participant in the Uprising of 1863, moved in with Šliūpas. Around the same time, Dembskis quit priesthood and became a close collaborator with Šliūpas. Dembskis lived with Šliūpas until his death in 1913. On Easter in 1891, brokered by Burba, Šliūpas publicly made peace with Juozas Paukštys and Juozas Andziulaitis-Kalnėnas, the publisher and editor of Vienybė lietuvninkų respectively – the three men went for a confession and communion in Pittston, Pennsylvania. Šliūpas even contributed articles to Vienybė lietuvninkų and attended a congress of the Alliance of All Lithuanian Catholic Societies of America, chaired by Burba, in November 1891, while Burba established a local chapter of the Lithuanian Scientific Society in Plymouth in February 1891. However, the collaboration with Burba broke down in 1892. Šlūpas felt so insulted by Trumpa peržvalga lietuvystės darbų Amerikoje (A Short Review of Lithuanian Activities in America), a booklet that Burba published in 1892, that he sued Burba in court.

==== Socialist activist ====
Perhaps due to the falling out with Burba, Šliūpas anti-religious and pro-socialist views grew stronger and louder. In 1893, he anonymously published an 18-page brochure translated from German Die Gottespest by the anarchist Johann Most which vulgarly attacked the Church. On 28 January 1894, in response to the Kražiai massacre in Lithuania, Šliūpas and Dembskis organized a protest in Shenandoah during which they publicly denounced not only the Russian Tsar but also the pope. This caused an uproar among other Lithuanian organizations. Protesting against pope's silence on the massacre, Šliūpas officially left the Catholic Church and joined the Presbyterian Church. The religious tensions only grew when Matas Andriukaitis, a Lithuanian, accidentally shot himself with Šliūpas' gun on Maundy Thursday (22 March 1894). The funeral procession was followed by insulting and mocking booing and shouting. Šliūpas then submitted a formal complaint to the city's officials against six most active protesters. The complaint was rejected and the six people sued Šliūpas for defamation in Pottsville, Pennsylvania. The trial continued for 24 days and involved numerous witnesses, including 13 priests. When testifying, Šliūpas refused to swear on the Bible. Eventually, Šliūpas was found not guilty but the tensions forced him to relocate to Scranton, Pennsylvania. There, he settled in a Jewish neighborhood and primarily served workers of the Dickson Manufacturing Company.

In January 1894, he began publishing the socialist weekly magazine Nauja gadynė (The New Era). It was first published in Mount Carmel, Pennsylvania, before being moved to Shenandoah in fall 1894 and to Scranton in August 1895 where it was published in Šliūpas' basement. It had only one official editor (Šliūpas' co-brother-in-law) and was published by the Lithuanian Scientific Society. Nauja gadynė marked a transition for Šliūpas' works from predominantly focused on Lithuanian nationalism with some socialist topics and ideas to predominantly focused on socialism and proletarian internationalism. He wrote about the bright future promised by socialism, strikes and disturbances caused by socialists and anarchists around the world, biographies of prominent socialist leaders, etc. He did not fully embrace the internationalism, retaining the concept of nations. The last issue appeared on 2 June 1896.

In 1895, Šliūpas published Tikyba ir mokslas (Science and Religion) – a collection of 15 mostly translated articles that he was working on since around 1885 – that argued that Christianity and science were fundamentally incompatible. The book included a scientific biography of Jesus as well as articles describing the vulgar and dark Middle Ages, praising the ideas of equality (Liberté, égalité, fraternité) of the French Revolution, and expressing optimism that scientific advances would usher an era of universal prosperity. In 1902, Šliūpas published Spėka ir medega, a translation of Force and Matter by Ludwig Büchner – a scientific materialism work that Šliūpas was interested in since his studies in Moscow in 1881 and that he already discussed in a series of articles published in Apšvieta in 1892. This translation presented a particular challenge as the Lithuanian language lacked words to describe the abstract forces and ideas. Šliūpas spent a considerable effort to come up with Lithuanian neologisms instead of borrowing words from other languages.

Šliūpas established contacts with the founders of the Social Democratic Party of Lithuania (established in 1896) and discussed the possibility of representing Lithuania at the International Socialist Workers and Trade Union Congress in London. In response to the Lattimer massacre, when police shot and killed several protesting mine workers including five Lithuanians in September 1897, Šliūpas organized a protest meeting in Scranton. His suggestion for a socialist group was met with enthusiasm and about 70 people signed up. Though the membership quickly declined to about 30 people, it was the first Lithuanian socialist group. Other groups were soon organized in other Lithuanian communities and the idea of a unifying Lithuanian socialist organization was raised in 1899. Šliūpas organized local socialist groups, delivered speeches and lectures, discussed the need for a centralized organization, and even planned to attend the International Socialist Congress in 1904. He was a leader of Lithuanian miners during the Coal strike of 1902. Šliūpas unsuccessfully ran in the Pennsylvania's 11th congressional district twice for the United States House of Representatives, as a candidate of the Populist Party in 1896 and as a candidate of the Socialist Labor Party in 1900. It seems that around the same time he attempted to expand outside the Lithuanian circles: he became an associate of Franciszek Hodur, founder of the Polish National Catholic Church, and published articles in Polish press calling for a unity among all nations oppressed by the Russians.

But he did not entirely abandon Lithuanian nationalist causes. In 1897, he translated and published a work by Edmund Veckenstedt on Samogitian myths. He published a 278-page work on the origins of Lithuanians (he followed the discredited theories of Jonas Basanavičius that Lithuanians hailed from the Balkans or Anatolia) in 1899 and the first two volumes of his three-volume history of Lithuania in 1904–1905. He organized the Martyrs' Committee, which raised funds for the support of Lithuanians imprisoned or exiled to Siberia due to their political or cultural work, in 1900 and became treasurer of the Union of Lithuanian Freethinkers in America (Lietuvių laisvamanių susivienijimas Amerikoje) in 1901.

The Lithuanian Socialist Party of America was established only in May 1905 after the start of the revolution in Russia. Šliūpas was elected its treasurer but withdrew within five months due to disagreements on how to distribute funds raised for the support of the revolution and Lithuanians. He wanted to send funds to Draugas (established by Vincas Mickevičius-Kapsukas), Social Democratic Party of Lithuania, Lithuanian Democratic Party, and individuals persecuted by the Tsarist regime. Others argued that the funds should be sent just to the Social Democratic Party. Šliūpas withdrew from the party and more active socialist work, though he continued to support socialist ideas.

==== Nationalist and freethinker ====
In 1905, Šliūpas became treasurer of the Aušra Society, established in Chicago in 1901. He continued to be its treasurer until it dissolved in 1912. During that time, the society provided financial aid of $4,273.80 (equivalent to $143,000 in 2025) to Lithuanian students (20 men and 7 women) studying at various universities. Lithuanians wanted to organize a protest march in support of the Russian Revolution, but Šliūpas proposed a multipartisan congress (perhaps inspired by the Great Seimas of Vilnius). 169 Lithuanian activists, including 50 socialists, gathered in Philadelphia in February 1906. Šliūpas wrote a long resolution which was accepted by the delegates but protested by the socialists. It called the Russian Empire to adopt a constitution that would guarantee some of the fundamental rights, (Note: The requirement for fundamental human rights was mostly fulfilled when the Russian Constitution of 1906 was adopted in April. It guaranteed the freedoms of assembly, speech, association and religion.) grant political autonomy to Lithuania which would be united with Latvia, implement a land reform that would distribute land of manors and monasteries to landless peasants, grant amnesty to political prisoners. At the end of 1906, Šliūpas delivered several speeches in Lithuanian immigrant communities and published the speech in a separate brochure in which he returned to Lithuanian national issues – union with Poland and abuses of the Catholic clergy. However, Šliūpas did not join the Lithuanian Alliance of America – it appears he first participated in its 25th anniversary congress in 1910 when he delivered a speech reviewing Lithuanian activities in the United States over the last 25 years. Šliūpas also returned to the criticism of the Catholic Church with the publication of Tikri ir netikri šventieji (True and Fake Saints) in 1907. The work critically examined the lives of Catholic martyrs Stanislaus of Szczepanów and Hermenegild and contrasted them with four biographies of "martyrs of science" (Hypatia, Michael Servetus, Giordano Bruno, and Kazimierz Łyszczyński).

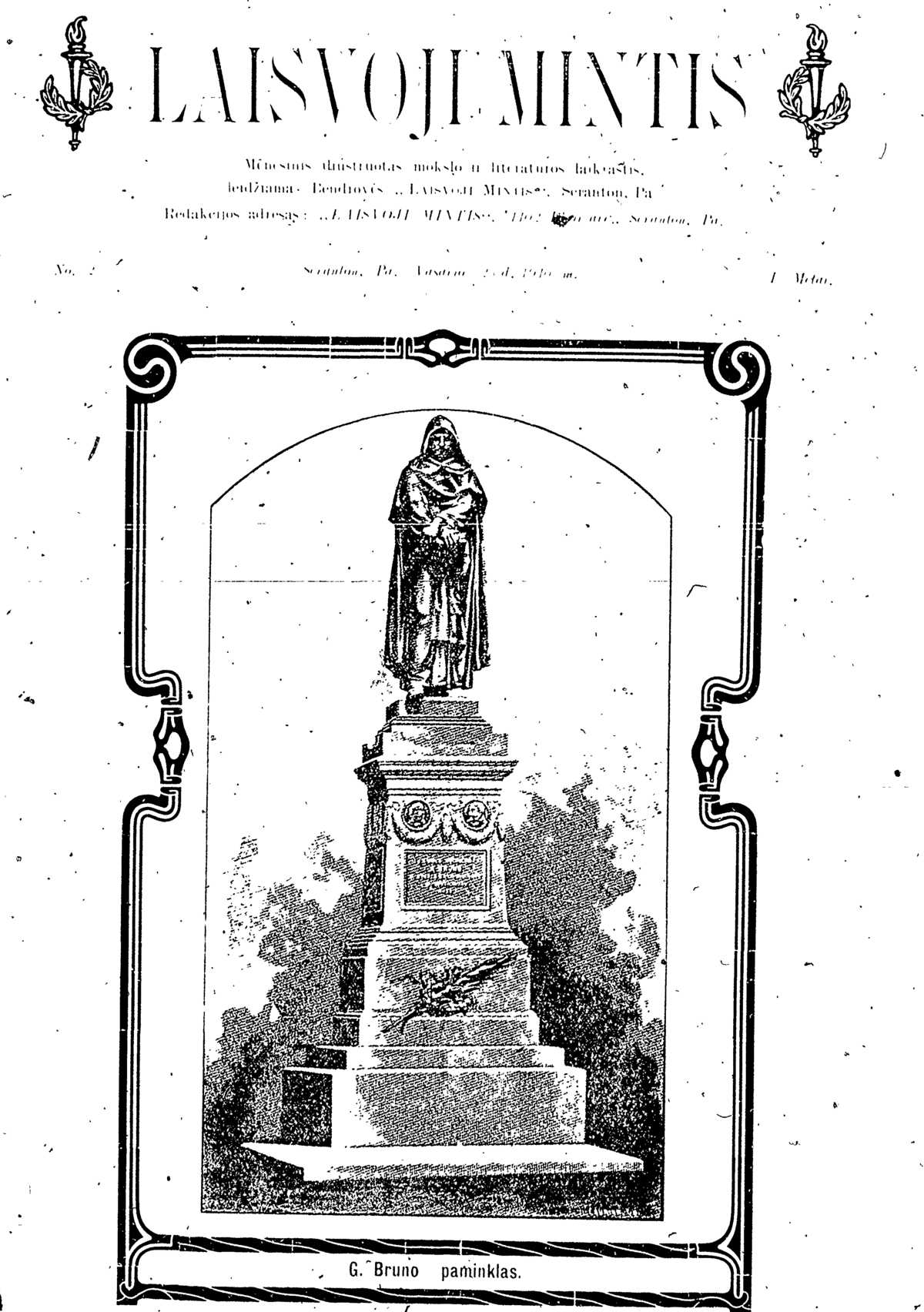
Cover of Laisvoji mintis with a monument of Giordano Bruno

In 1909, Šliūpas published the last third volume of the history of Lithuania that covered the period from the Union of Lublin (1569) to the Third Partition of the Polish–Lithuanian Commonwealth (1795). In January 1910, he began publishing the monthly magazine Laisvoji mintis (Free Thought) with the help of two new Lithuanian immigrants with prior experience in publishing periodicals in Scranton – Karolis Račkauskas (pen name Vairas) and Kleopas Jurgelionis (pen name Kalėdų Kaukės). The magazine promoted the ideas of freethought and was primarily devoted to science. It published many articles on natural sciences, many of them translated (e.g. A Picture Book of Evolution by Dennis Hird or on popular astronomy by Garrett P. Serviss). Šliūpas contributed biographical articles (e.g. on Giordano Bruno, Lucilio Vanini, Jan Hus, Francisco Ferrer) and articles on the 19th-century history of Lithuania (written as a continuation to his three-volume history of Lithuania). The magazine was discontinued after 60 issues in May 1915. Šliūpas resigned as editor in December 1914 citing his age and poor eyesight. Privately, he mentioned to Račkauskas that he spent more than $5,000 (equivalent to $161,000 in 2025) of his own money on the magazine.

Šliūpas supported two Lithuanian fundraising drives. In 1911, priests Juozas Tumas-Vaižgantas and Konstantinas Olšauskas collected donations for the headquarters of the Saulė Society in Kaunas. Tumas-Vaižgantas famously said to Šliūpas, "Jonas, I love you, but I burn your writings." In 1913, Jonas Basanavičius and Martynas Yčas collected funds for the construction of the headquarters of the Lithuanian Scientific Society in Vilnius. Yčas later married Šliūpas' youngest daughter Hypatija.

==== During World War I ====
The outbreak of World War I galvanized Lithuanian Americans to organize support for the war refugees and start thinking about the future of Lithuania after the war. Šliūpas tried to organize a multipartisan congress (similar to the 1906 congress in Philadelphia), but Catholic activists organized their own congress in Chicago in September 1914. Šliūpas then organized a congress of nationalists and socialists in New York in October. The socialists were better organized and wanted to take full control of the congress and the nationalists withdrew in protest. They gathered separately in Brooklyn and decided to establish their own organization, the Lithuanian National League of America (Amerikos lietuvių tautinė sandara), as well as two foundations (chaired by Šliūpas) to provide financial aid to war refugees in Lithuania. Thus, the third "middle" group of Lithuanian activists emerged. Šliūpas began agitating for Lithuania, visiting Lithuanian communities in New England and publishing Lithuania in Retrospect and Prospect, a short English-language overview of the history of Lithuania. The two foundations raised approximately $97,000 (equivalent to $3,087,000 in 2025).

In June 1915, Stasys Šimkus arrived to United States to collect donation for the Lithuanian Society for the Relief of War Sufferers. He tried to work with all three (Catholic, socialist, and nationalist) factions, but ended up touring Lithuanian communities with the help of the Lithuanian National League of America and Šliūpas. Up to February 1916, he collected $9,361.51 (equivalent to $297,936 in 2025). Antanas Milukas and other Lithuanians petitioned President Woodrow Wilson to proclaim the Lithuanian Day when all across United States donations would be collected for the benefit of Lithuanian war refugees. On 1 November 1916, Lithuanians collected $176,863 (equivalent to $5,232,873 in 2025). The funds were collected and distributed by a 12-member committee, six Catholics and six (including Šliūpas) nationalists.

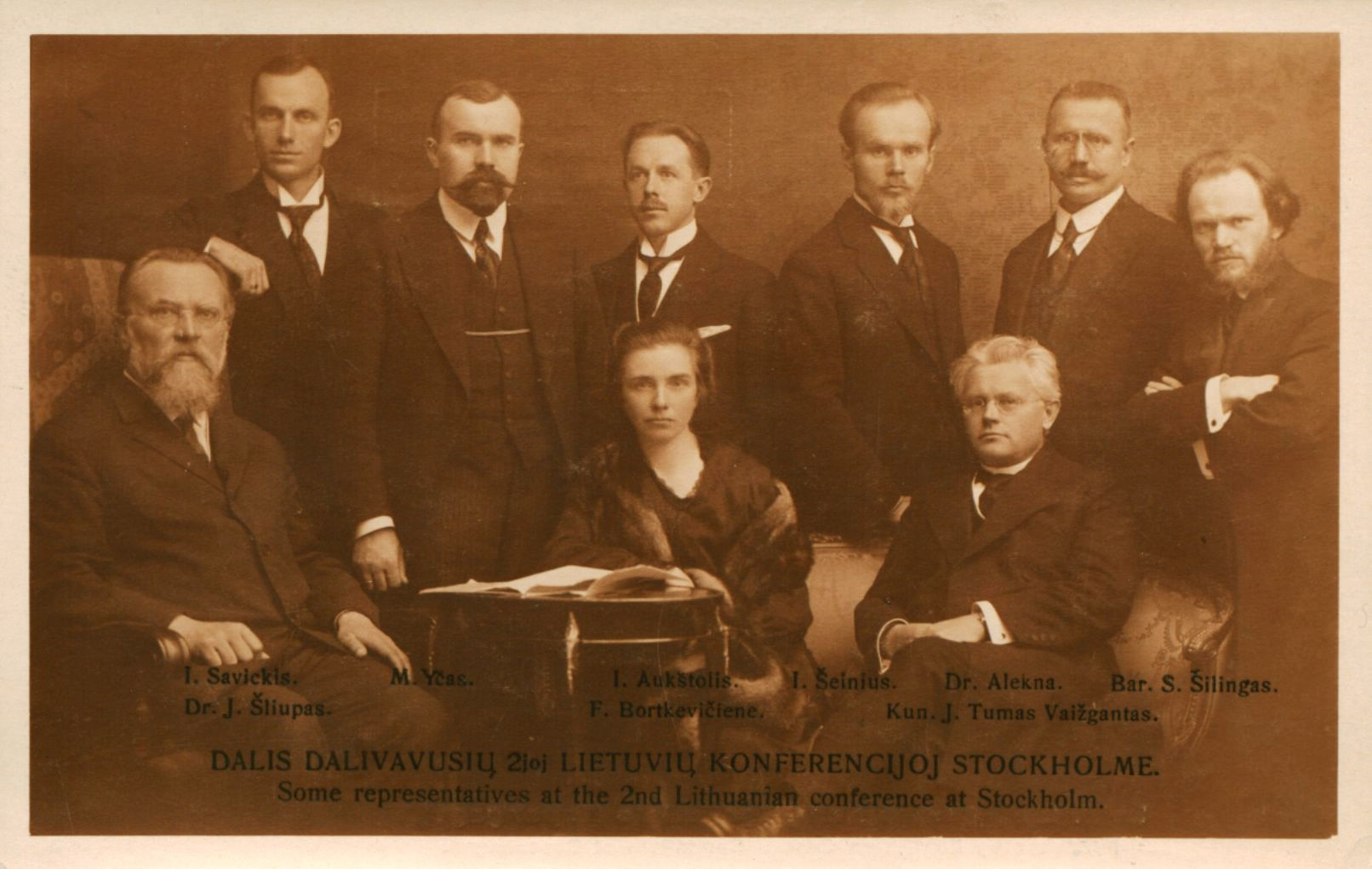
Šliūpas (sitting on the left) at the Stockholm conference in 1917

The foundation of the Lithuanian National League of America delegated Šliūpas to visit Russia. He departed from San Francisco to Honolulu on 26 April 1916 (crossing the Atlantic Ocean was unsafe due to the U-boat Campaign). He was accompanied by his eldest daughter Aldona who volunteered for the Red Cross. Šliūpas visited Lithuanian refugees and evacuees in Moscow, Saint Petersburg, Kiev, and elsewhere to find out what support Lithuanian Americans could provide. At the same time, he tried to gather support for a Lithuania–Latvia union. He stopped in Voronezh for a longer time, visiting his son-in-law Martynas Yčas. Šliūpas could not visit the German-occupied Lithuania and instead traveled to Stockholm to attend the Lithuanian conference in October 1917 which approved the resolutions adopted by Vilnius Conference and recognized the Council of Lithuania as the main political representative of the Lithuanian nation. Šliūpas was the only representative of Lithuanian Americans in attendance.

Šliūpas remained in Stockholm until May 1918. During that time he published two political booklets, Lithuanian Lietuvių-latvių respublika ir Šiaurės Tautų Sąjunga (Lithuanian–Latvian Republic and the Union of Nordic Nations) and English Essay on the Past, Present, and Future of Lithuania. He sent memorandums to President Woodrow Wilson about the need to support independence movements of the various nations in the Russian Empire and to British officials urging to recognize Lithuania's independence. Šliūpas also attended the third Lithuanian conference in Stockholm in January 1918. The conference adopted a seven-point demand list to Russia and Germany to recognize independent Lithuania, repay war damages, withdraw their armies, include Lithuanian representatives in any peace negotiations – the full text of the resolution was reprinted in Essay on the Past, Present, and Future of Lithuania.

Šliūpas returned to United States in May 1918 and became vice-chairman of the Lithuanian Executive Committee organized by a joint Catholic and nationalist conference in New York in March 1918 and chaired by Tomas Naruševičius. The primary goal of the Executive Committee was to inform the American public about Lithuania and to lobby American politicians to support Lithuania's independence. Šliūpas also joined the Mid-European Union established by the Czechoslovak politician Tomáš Garrigue Masaryk. There, he clashed with Roman Dmowski and Ignacy Jan Paderewski (future Ministers of Foreign Affairs of Poland) over theirs plans for a Polish–Lithuanian state. When Henry Cabot Lodge, the new Senate Majority Leader, delivered a speech in which he urged to preserve the territorial integrity of Russia, Šliūpas wrote a memorandum demanding independence for Lithuania and managed to get it published in the Congressional Record on 29 August 1918. Šliūpas also contacted Robert Lansing, the Secretary of State, Frank A. Golder, a member of The Inquiry preparing for a post-war peace conference, Theodore Roosevelt, the former president.

=== In independent Lithuania ===
==== Diplomat and businessman ====
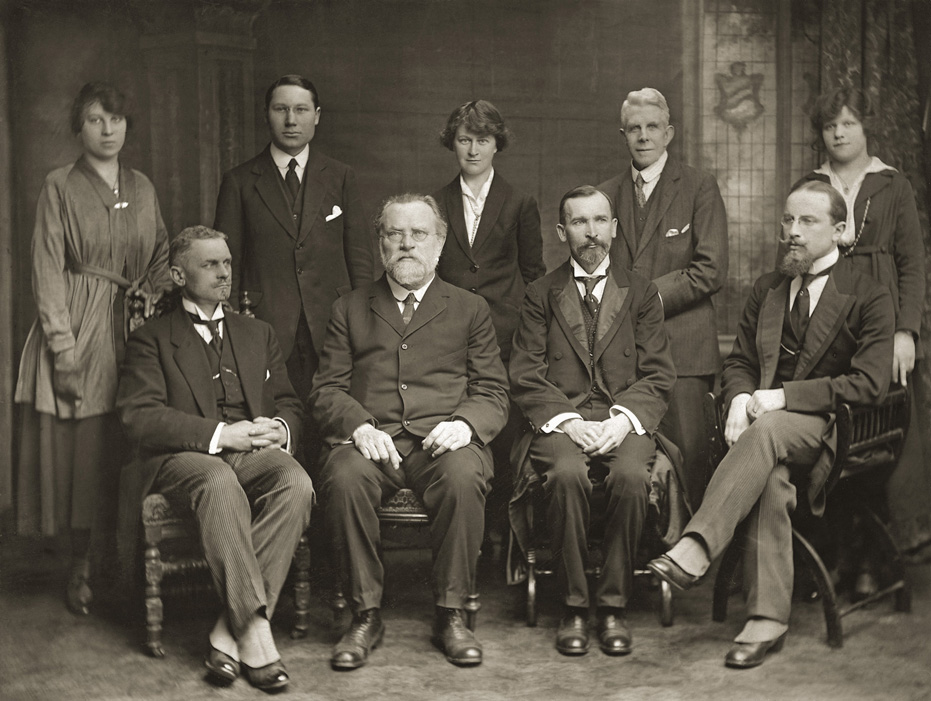
Lithuanian representatives in London (Šliūpas sitting second from left)

According to Šliūpas memoirs, professor James Young Simpson invited him to the United Kingdom on behalf of the Foreign Office. He arrived to London on 4 February 1919. He delivered speeches on Lithuania's independence to the Union of Democratic Control as well as Lithuanian immigrant communities in London, Glasgow, Burnbank, Edinburgh, Liverpool, Manchester. He also held talks with Latvian activists promoting his ideas of a Lithuanian–Latvia union. When Lithuania sent its official representative Vincas Čepinskis in mid-April 1919, Šliūpas departed to the Paris Peace Conference on 22 May. Together with his son-in-law Yčas, Šliūpas worked to purchase $5 million (equivalent to $92,850,000 in 2025) worth of various military goods from the U.S. Liquidation Commission (instead of transporting various supplies back to United States, the U.S. Army sold surplus goods to other governments and businesses). Šliūpas personally supervised the purchase of medical supplies worth about $500,000 in Saint-Nazaire and accompanied their delivery to Lithuania. It was the first time that Šliūpas returned to Lithuania since 1883. But he did not stay there for long as he was sent as the first Lithuanian diplomatic representative to Latvia in August 1919. With military attaché Ladas Natkevičius, he also represented Lithuania to Estonia. There is little information available on his activities in Latvia. At the time, Latvia was fighting the West Russian Volunteer Army but Lithuania refused to provide aid and Lithuania avoided establishing diplomatic contacts with the Soviet Russia due to its international isolation – positions that Šliūpas appears to have disagreed with. He also did not get along with Zigfrīds Anna Meierovics, Latvian Foreign Minister. He resigned in December 1919 and returned to Lithuania.

Šliūpas returned to Lithuania with a capital of $38,000 (equivalent to $611,000 in 2025) that he invested in various Lithuanian enterprises, many of them established or chaired by his son-in-law Martynas Yčas. In February 1919, the first Lithuanian Shipping Company (Lietuvos laivininkystės bendrovė), later known as the Lithuanian Steamship Corporation (Lietuvos garlaivių bendrovė), was organized to provide passenger and cargo transportation via the Neman and other rivers in Lithuania. Šliūpas returned to United States to organize his affairs for the permanent move to Lithuania and at the same time sold about $50,000 worth of shares of the company to Lithuanian Americans. He also invested in the Trade and Industry Bank, oil pressing company Ringuva, brewery Gubernija, metalworking factory Nemunas, Montvila spirits factory, and others. He founded Žuvis ir gintaras (Fish and Amber) company in Palanga and invested 25,000 litas.

In 1922–1923, Šliūpas split his time between Biržai and Šiauliai where he headed local branches of the Trade and Industry Bank. As a banker, he organized completion of the narrow-gauge railway that connected Biržai to Šiauliai. In Biržai, he renewed and renovated the printing press that was established by Yčas and Povilas Jakubėnas in 1911–1912 and established a successful trading company Agaras. He also tried to organize a spa around mineral water springs in Likėnai near Biržai. In 1923, he invested 70,000 litas and established Titnagas printing press in Šiauliai. Šliūpas invited German specialists and the press was known for its quality. Among other things, Titnagas printed 17 books by Šliūpas and about 150 books by book publishing company Kultūra that Šliūpas supported financially. Many of his investments were lost when the Trade and Industry Bank failed in 1927. Šliūpas had guaranteed many loans of the bank, Yčas, and other companies. He was sued by the Bank of Lithuania for a guarantee of 25,000 litas loan taken by the Trade and Industry Bank. The Lithuanian Tribunal ordered Šliūpas to pay the loan, 6% annual interest, and court costs in 1933. Unable to pay, he appealed to President Antanas Smetona. Eventually, Bank of Lithuania seized Titnagas to cover the debts.

==== Educator and mayor ====
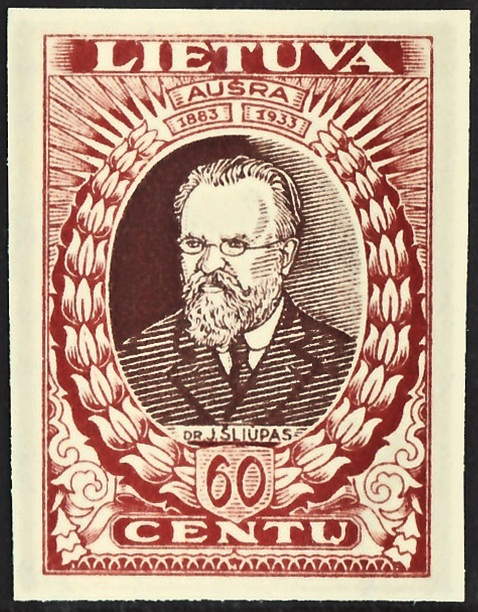
Šliūpas on a Lithuanian postage stamp issued for the 50th anniversary of Aušra in 1933

In 1922–1923, Šliūpas taught hygiene and world literature at the Saulė Gymnasium in Biržai and Lithuanian and English literature at the Šiauliai Gymnasium. As an educator, he organized public lectures and attended local meetings of the Lithuanian Evangelical Reformed Church. In early 1924, Šliūpas had a stomach operation in Königsberg. Upon his return, chaplain of the Šiauliai Gymnasium complained that Šliūpas' lessons included anti-religious themes to the Minister of Education Leonas Bistras. Šliūpas was asked to refrain from anti-religious comments, but he resigned and moved to Kaunas. In February 1923, he received honorary doctorates in medicine and history from the University of Lithuania; (Note: Many other sources, e.g. Bačėnė 2017 or Palangytė 2014, provide that he received the second honorary degree in history in 1925 and not in 1923.) he received the third honorary doctorate in law in 1939. From fall 1924, Šliūpas became a privatdozent and taught history of medicine at the Faculty of Medicine of the University of Lithuania. It was an elective class and not every semester there were enough students to hold it. He resigned after four years and received a government pension. He published his lessons on hygiene and history of medicine as separate books in 1928 and 1934.

The failure of the Trade and Industry Bank brought financial difficulties, while the death of his wife (4 April 1928) brought a personal loss. He married Grasilda Grauslytė, a sister of his maid and 38 years his junior, in September 1929. His three children strongly disapproved the marriage and the couple moved to his new wife's hometown Palanga where their son Vytautas was born in 1930. (Note: The name Vytautas was chosen in honor of Grand Duke Vytautas as Lithuania celebrated his 500th death anniversary in 1930.) Palanga was transforming from a fishermen village to a popular seaside resort and Šliūpas worked to obtain city rights. In January 1933, he became the first mayor of Palanga. In summer 1933, he hosted the official visit of Robert Baden-Powell, founder of the scout movement. He worked on lowering electricity prices, ensuring street cleanliness, improving transportation (e.g. asking city residents not to use sidewalks to ride bikes or herd cattle), etc. In November 1934, he was replaced by Pranas Kraujelis who was removed in December 1936 for mishandling 30,098 litas of city's funds. From that time until Šliūpas returned as mayor in March 1938, Palanga had only an acting mayor. On 10 May 1938, Palanga suffered a major fire – about 120 residential buildings burned down leaving 1,500 people homeless. Šliūpas had to organize aid, construct shelters, and rebuilt the city with larger more modern buildings. About half of the people affected by the fire were Jews who organized a separate relief effort clashing with Lithuanians over the funds. The experience prompted Šliūpas to study Talmud and write an anti-Semitic work. Šliūpas resigned as mayor on 1 July 1939 due to old age and the fact that he, as a recipient of a state pension, could not receive any government wages.

==== Freethinker and writer ====
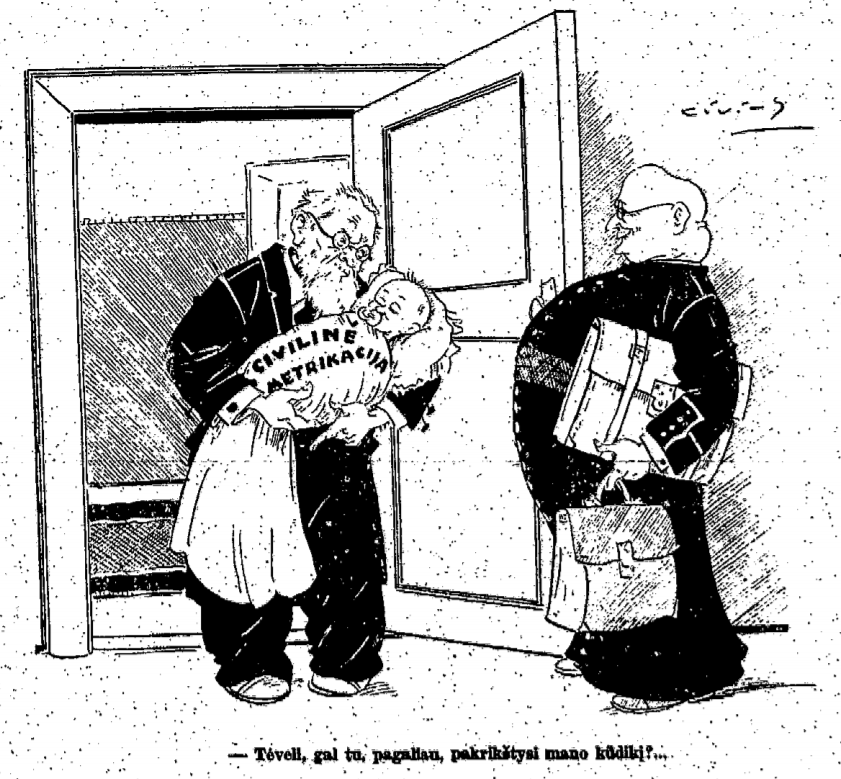
Caricature of Šliūpas and his lobbying efforts on civil registration published in December 1938

Šliūpas established the first chapters of the Freethinkers' Society of Ethical Culture (Laisvamanių etinės kultūros draugija), a society to promote freethought in Lithuania, in Biržai and Šiauliai in 1922 and 1924. Šliūpas became editor of the reestablished Laisvoji mintis (Free Thought) in November 1933 and continued to edit it up until the Soviet occupation of Lithuania in June 1940. The magazine focused on humanities, particularly history, and balanced academic articles with agitation. Šliūpas also promoted freethought policies in daily life. He campaigned for non-religious cemeteries, civil registration of births, marriages, and deaths, non-religious schools. When the new communist regime established civil birth registration in 1940, Šliūpas' son Vytautas was the first to be registered in Palanga.

Šliūpas was an outspoken critic of the authoritarian regime of President Antanas Smetona. Already in February 1927, he published an article in Lietuvos žinios in which he called Smetona a hot-head and power-hungry. On 23 November 1935, during a military celebration at the Vytautas the Great War Museum which was broadcast live over the radio, Šliūpas delivered a critical speech with the president and other politicians of the Lithuanian Nationalist Union in attendance. In April 1939, he wrote a letter to the government of Prime Minister Jonas Černius, which he managed to get published only in Naujoji gadynė in United States in September. The letter urged democratic reforms and called Smetona's regime "stifling oligarchy after a fascist example." Nevertheless, his 75th birthday in March 1936 was marked with an official ceremony at the Kaunas State Theatre – many officials, including rector of the Vytautas Magnus University, Minister of Education, Minister of Defense, gave speeches celebrating Šliūpas' life and accomplishments. Šliūpas was also awarded the Order of the Lithuanian Grand Duke Gediminas (2nd class in 1928, 1st class in 1936). He also received the Latvian Order of the Three Stars (2nd class) in 1932.

Šliūpas continued to write and publish various works. In 1928, Lietuvos aidas published his long essay, which he called his political testament, on the perfect state and government that would eliminate social inequality. In 1929, he wrote and published a historical work on the Reformation in Lithuania and the Radziwiłł family. In 1930, he republished his Tikri ir netikri šventieji. In the foreword, he explained that the second edition was prompted by the scandal of Konstantinas Olšauskas, a Catholic priest who was accused of murdering his suspected lover, and attacked the Catholic Church. A priest sued Šliūpas for slander and he received a one-month suspended prison sentence. Šliūpas appealed to the Lithuanian Tribunal, but the sentence was upheld. In 1932, he wrote a work on the Baltic mythology in which he still relied on already outdated and discredited theories and authors, such as the Thracian origin theory of Jonas Basanavičius or the dubious mythology of Theodor Narbutt. A year later he published a review of the Catholic Church activities in independent Lithuania since 1919. He also published translated works of freethinkers, including A History of Freedom of Thought by J. B. Bury (in 1923), Comparative Religion by Joseph Estlin Carpenter (1926), two works by Joseph McCabe that argued against the notion that the Church preserved and built the Western civilization (both in 1937), a work by Robert G. Ingersoll (1937), The Evolution of the Idea of God by Grant Allen (1938).

==== World War II and death ====
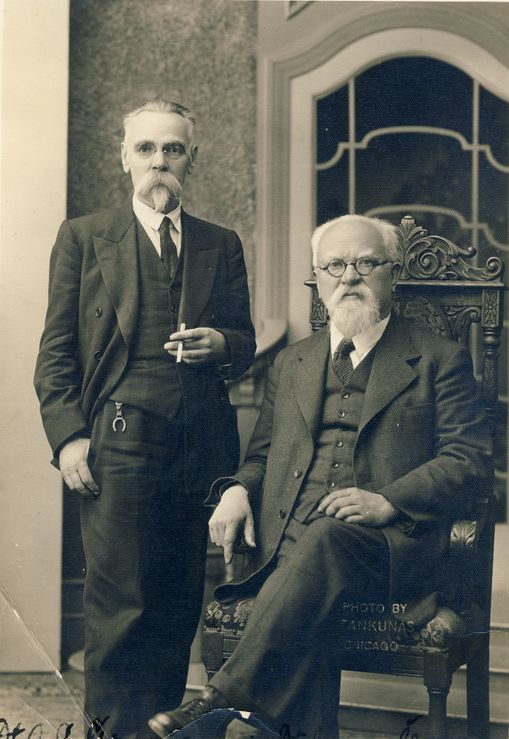
Šliūpas (sitting) in Chicago in 1936

Together with his wife and son, he sailed from Gothenburg to New York aboard SS Drottningholm on 2 May 1936. In United States, Šliūpas delivered speeches and lectures in twenty different communities of Lithuanian Americans, including Pittsburgh, Detroit, Grand Rapids, Chicago. He also attended the 25th anniversary celebration of the Lithuanian National Cemetery near Chicago and the 50th anniversary congress of the Lithuanian Alliance of America in Cleveland. Šliūpas promoted the activities of the Freethinkers' Society of Ethical Culture and asked Lithuanian Americans for financial support. He returned to Lithuania on 22 July. Šliūpas traveled to United States again in 1939 to attend the New York World's Fair – his daughter Aldona helped organizing the Lithuanian exhibition. He arrived to New York aboard MS Gripsholm three days before the outbreak of World War II. Šliūpas hurried back to Lithuania.

After the Soviet occupation of Lithuania in June 1940, Šliūpas was invited (most likely via Mečislovas Gedvilas who was a member of the Society of Ethical Culture) to the People's Government of Lithuania, but refused. Former Prime Minister Antanas Merkys stopped by Šliūpas home in Palanga when he tried to flee abroad. Unlike many Lithuanian periodicals, Laisvoji mintis was not abolished by the new communist regime but Šliūpas was replaced as editor by Kostas Korsakas. Šliūpas' investments and other property was nationalized, but the new government made a special exception allowing him keep his house in Palanga. During the June deportation, Šliūpas sister-in-law was deported to Siberia and he received a warning that his own family was on a deportee list.

In June 1941, at the start of the German occupation of Lithuania, several prominent residents of Palanga met at the city hall and decided to elect new city council, headed by Šliūpas, in hopes of reigning in the chaotic situation. However, according to Šliūpas' memoirs, he was falsely identified as a Jew sympathizer and briefly arrested by the Germans. Šliūpas had expressed anti-Semitic attitudes in his earlier works (for example, complaining about Jewish near-monopoly on trade in Lithuania), but became radicalized during the war and blamed Jewish Bolshevism on the communist atrocities in 1940–1941. During the occupation, Šliūpas struggled financially (he lived on a monthly pension of 40 Reichsmarks which was increased to 200 in 1942) and had difficulties obtaining basic food items. He communicated with Petras Kubiliūnas, the General Counsel of the Generalbezirk Litauen, and even floated an idea of a special commission to visit Adolf Hitler to present a proposal for Lithuania's independence. He also continued to write and translate, though most of his works remained unpublished, including a translation of Atoms in Action by George R. Harrison. Some of his war-time writings show influence of Nazi ideology. For example, in an article published in 1943, Šliūpas advocated for a government program to euthanize incurably ill patients.

In October 1944, Šliūpas decided to flee Lithuania ahead of the advancing Red Army. Together with his wife and son, he reached Vienna aboard a German train. He was invited by the Lithuanian Aid (Litauische Hilfsstelle) at the Reich Ministry for the Occupied Eastern Territories to Berlin to record a speech that would be broadcast to Lithuanian Americans. Other Lithuanians recruited for a similar effort included Mykolas Biržiška and Kazys Musteikis. Šliūpas wrote his speech but before he could record it, he died in a Berlin hotel at about 9 a.m. on 6 November 1944. Lithuanians in Berlin organized a special committee, chaired by Vaclovas Sidzikauskas, to organize his funeral. Despite difficult wartime conditions, it was an official affair with opera singers and speeches by Lithuanian officials. He was cremated in Wilmersdorf and his ashes were buried at the Lithuanian National Cemetery in Justice, Illinois in 1948. A monument in the cemetery was built in 1950. In 1989, his former home in Palanga was turned into a memorial museum. In 2009–2012, Šliūpas' son Vytautas transferred family's vast library and archives (books, periodicals, manuscripts, letters, photos, personal items, etc.) to the library of Šiauliai University.

== Works ==
=== Writings ===
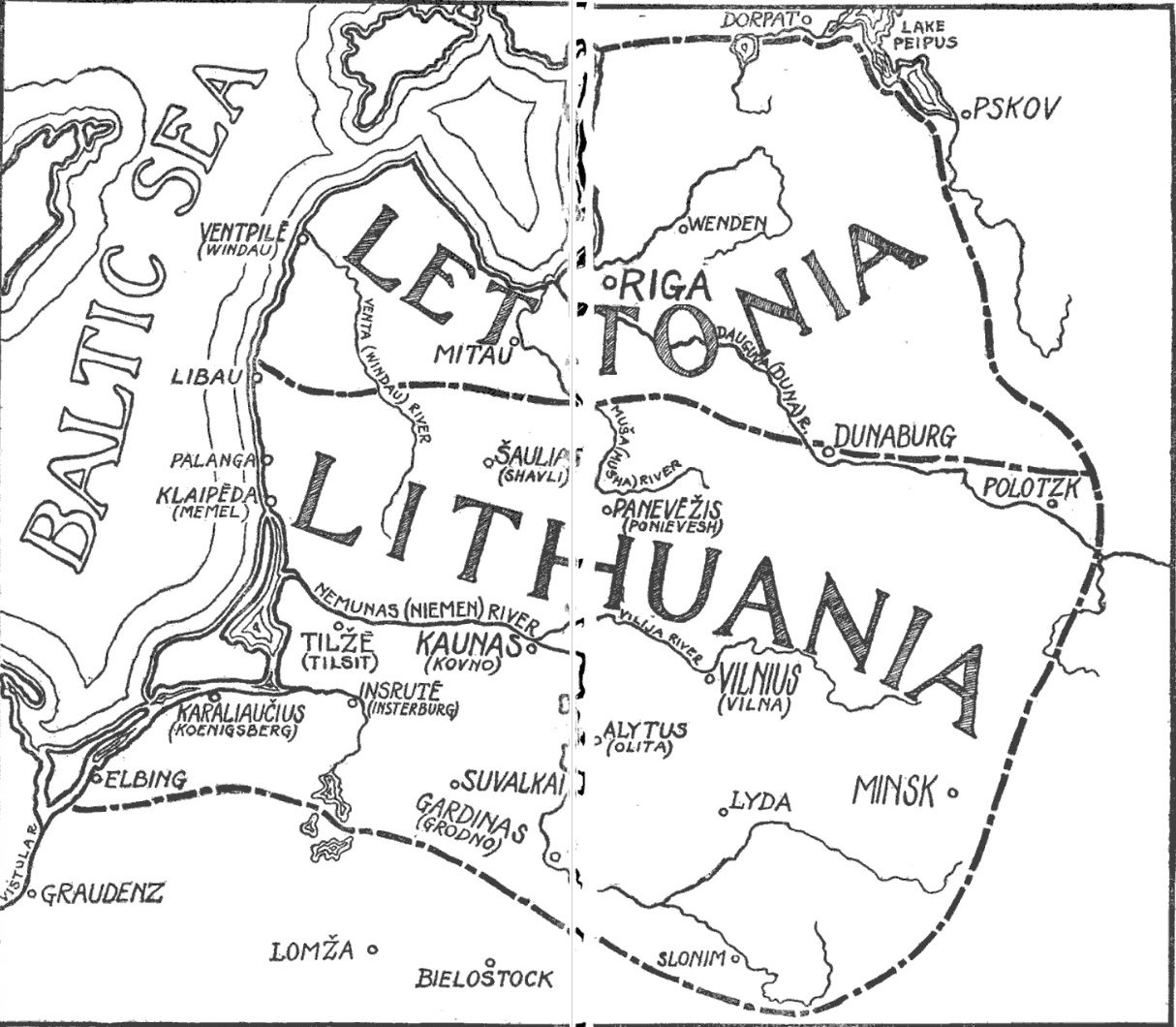
Map of the proposed Lithuania–Latvia state published by Šliūpas in 1915

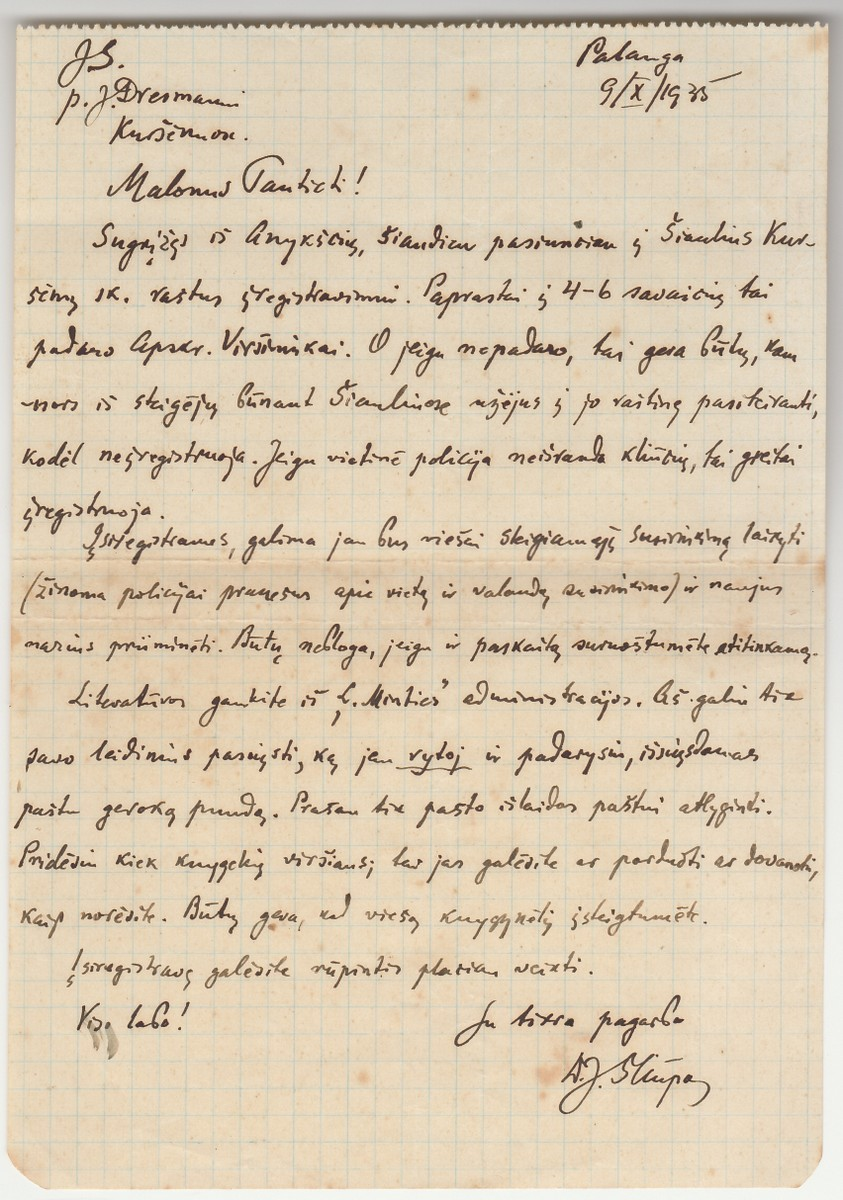
A letter written by Šliūpas in October 1935

Šliūpas was a prolific author. During his life, he published more than 70 books and brochures as well as contributed numerous articles to Lithuanian, American, Polish, German, Swedish, and French periodicals, including Ateitis, Garsas, Iliustruotoji Lietuva, Kultūra, Lietuva, Lietuwißka Ceitunga, Lietuvos žinios, Naujienos, Dziennik Poznański, Frankfurter Zeitung, Svensk Tidskrift. Much of his writing is translated and adapted from other works. Even by his own admission, he prioritized quantity over quality and on occasion plagiarized other authors without giving proper credit. He prioritized promotion of ideas (didactic and propaganda goals) over original research. Even in his obituary, Mykolas Biržiška wrote that Šliūpas will be remembered not for his writings which were often of low value, but for his tireless work and dedication to the Lithuanian causes.

Researcher Charles Perrin described Šliūpas as a chameleon who held fluid and sometimes outright contradictory views at the same time. At different times, he had different religions (Catholicism and atheism), belonged to different nationalities (Polish, Lithuanian, American), held different political views (Lithuanian nationalist, socialist, anti-fascist sympathetic to communism, an anti-communist sympathetic to Nazism). With his changing views, he published works on numerous topics – from politics and history to atheism and child education. His three-volume history of Lithuania was the longest Lithuanian-language history of Lithuania until the four-volume history was published in 1957–1975. Šliūpas was a compiler of other historical studies and he did not engage in historical research. He was not interested in academic and critical evaluation of historical facts. Rather, he saw history as a didactic tool to teach and inspire Lithuanians and, as many romantic historians, he idealized and glorified the past. One of the more original ideas was a union between Lithuania and Latvia that Šliūpas kept returning to throughout his life though it never gained traction.

Šliūpas wrote four autobiographies. The first was written in 1903 for the 20th anniversary of Aušra. After a stomach operation in 1924, he wrote his second autobiography which he published as a separate booklet in 1927. The third autobiography was written in 1931 and published in a collection of articles and documents on Šliūpas edited by Juozas V. Girdvainis in 1934. The last autobiography was written in 1941 and first published by Juozas Jakštas in 1979.

=== Editor of periodicals ===
Šliūpas edited the following newspapers and magazines:

- Aušra (Dawn) in 1883–1884
- Unija (Union) in 1884–1885
- Lietuviškasis balsas (The Lithuanian Voice) in 1885–1889
- Apšvieta (The Enlightenment) in 1892–1893
- Nauja gadynė (The New Era) in 1894–1896
- Laisvoji mintis (Free Thought) in 1910–1914 and 1933–1940

=== Organizations and societies ===
Michał Pius Römer called Šliūpas a better agitator than an organizer. He was a founder, chairman, or board member of various societies, including:

- Friends of Lithuania Society (Lietuvos mylėtojų draugystė) – founder in 1885, society active until 1888
- Alliance of All Lithuanians in America (Susivienijimas visų lietuvninkų Amerikoje) – founder in 1886, society active until 1888
- Lithuanian Scientific Society (Lietuvių mokslo draugystė) – founder in 1889, society active until 1896
- Union of Lithuanian Freethinkers in America (Lietuvių laisvamanių susivienijimas Amerikoje) – founder in 1900, society active until 1910
- Aušra Society (to provide financial support for Lithuanian students) – treasurer in 1904–1912
- Lithuanian Socialist Party of America (Amerikos lietuvių socialistų sąjunga) – treasurer in 1905
- Union of Lithuanian Freethinkers (Lietuvių laisvamanių sąjunga) – founder in 1910
- International College of Midwifery – president in 1912–1915
- Lithuanian Press Society (Lietuvių spaudos draugija) – chairman of a committee in 1912
- Lithuanian National League of America (Amerikos lietuvių tautinė sandara) – founder in 1914, society active until 1943
- Federation of Lithuanian Freethinkers (Lietuvių laisvamanių federacija) – founder in 1918, society active until 1922 in Chicago
- Lithuanian Executive Committee (Pildomasis komitetas) – vice-chairman in 1918
- Freethinkers' Society of Ethical Culture (Laisvamanių etinės kultūros draugija) – founder in 1923, society active until 1941

== Bibliography ==
- Adomavičius, Romas (2011). "Lietuvos Respublikos prekybinio laivyno raida 1921–1936 metais". Istorija. Mokslo darbai (in Lithuanian). 84. ISSN 1392-0456. Archived from the original on 2019-02-12.
- Bačėnė, Edita (25 March 2017). "Ne dėl garbės, o dėl tėvynės". Etaplius (in Lithuanian).
- Bendikienė, Sigutė (20 May 2016). "Prisiminkime tautos budintoją Joną Šliūpą (1861–1944)" (PDF). Mokslo Lietuva (in Lithuanian). 9 (563). ISSN 1392-7191.
- Garškaitė, Rosita (29 December 2014). "J. Šliūpas – modernaus Lietuvos valstybingumo tėvas". Lietuvos žinios (in Lithuanian).
- Grigaravičiūtė, Sandra (1999). "1918 m.: sausio 3 ir vasario 16 Lietuvos istorijoje" (PDF). Istorija. Mokslo darbai (in Lithuanian). 38. ISSN 1392-0456.
- Jakštas, Juozas (1979). Dr. Jonas Šliūpas (in Lithuanian). Chicago: Akademinės skautijos leidykla. OCLC 5223546.
- Jonaitis, Marius (2011). "Vienybės lietuvininkų" istorija (1886-1920 m.) (Master's thesis) (in Lithuanian). Vytautas Magnus University.
- Krapauskas, Virgil (2000). Nationalism and Historiography: The Case of Nineteenth-Century Lithuanian Historicism. New York: Columbia University Press. ISBN 0-88033-457-6.
- Krikštaponis, Vilmantas (15 June 2011). "Degęs Dievo ir Tėvynės meile. Kun. Antano Miluko 140-osioms gimimo metinėms". XXI amžius (in Lithuanian). 45 (1925). ISSN 2029-1299.
- Kvašytė, Regina (2011). "Jonas Šliūpas Latvijoje (1919–1920 m.)" (PDF). Acta humanitarica universitatis Saulensis (in Lithuanian). 12. ISSN 1822-7309.
- Laurinavičius, Česlovas (21 May 2011). "Jono Šliūpo pastabos apie Nepriklausomą Lietuvą". Voruta (in Lithuanian). 10 (724). ISSN 1392-0677.
- Matusevičienė, Nijolė; Stankevičienė, Janina (April 2016a). "J. Šliūpo Niujorko universiteto Medicinos fakulteto baigimo diplomas". Dr. Jonas Šliūpas: lietuvių tauta kitąkart ir šiandien... (in Lithuanian). Martynas Mažvydas National Library of Lithuania.
- Matusevičienė, Nijolė; Stankevičienė, Janina (April 2016b). "Kultūra • Mokslas • Valstybė • Ateitis" (PDF). Dr. Jonas Šliūpas: lietuvių tauta kitąkart ir šiandien... (in Lithuanian). Martynas Mažvydas National Library of Lithuania.
- Misiūnas, Remigijus (2016). "Lietuvių išeivių leidyba Jungtinėse Amerikos Valstijose XIX a. pabaigoje - XX a. viduryje: adresato problema". Knygotyra (in Lithuanian). 67 (67): 23. doi:10.15388/Knygotyra.2016.67.10175. ISSN 2345-0053.
- Nekrašius, Jonas (2011). "Dr. Jonas Šliūpas ir "Titnago" spaustuvė Šiauliuose" (PDF). Acta humanitarica universitatis Saulensis (in Lithuanian). 12. ISSN 1822-7309.
- Palangytė, Jurga (29 July 2014). "Jono Šliūpo muziejus". Žemaitijos muziejų, parkų kelias (in Lithuanian). Regionų kultūrinių iniciatyvų centras. Archived from the original on 5 March 2016.
- Paluckienė, Virginija (4 November 2022). "Palangos miesto savivaldai – 90 metų" (in Lithuanian). Palangos tiltas.
- Perrin, Charles (15 May 2011). "The 150 Year Anniversary of the Birth of Jonas Šliūpas (1861–1944)". Draugas.
- Perrin, Charles C. (Summer 2013). Lithuanians in the Shadow of Three Eagles: Vincas Kudirka, Martynas Jankus, Jonas Šliūpas and the Making of Modern Lithuania (PDF) (PhD Thesis). Georgia State University.
- Piročkinas, Arnoldas (1987). "Ką pasakoja senas laiškas?". Švyturys (in Lithuanian). 11. ISSN 0132-6546.
- Pšibilskis, Vygintas Bronius (2009). Mykolas Biržiška: patrioto, mokslininko, kultūrininko gyvenimo ir veiklos pėdsakais (in Lithuanian). Vilnius: Vilniaus universiteto leidykla. ISBN 9789955334620.
- Puzinas, Jonas (1966). "Ankstyvoji Amerikos lietuvių išeivija ir jų spauda". Karys (in Lithuanian). 5 (1422). ISSN 0022-9199.
- Roszkowski, Wojciech (2016). "Šliūpas Jonas". In Roszkowski, Wojciech; Kofman, Jan (eds.). Biographical Dictionary of Central and Eastern Europe in the Twentieth Century. Routledge. ISBN 978-0-7656-1027-0.
- Šalavėjienė, Alina (15 May 2015). "Aušrininko dr. Jono Šliūpo archyvas Šiaulių universiteto bibliotekoje" (PDF). Mokslo Lietuva (in Lithuanian). 9 (541). ISSN 1392-7191.
- "Kaimuose ir miestuose". Šaltinis (in Lithuanian). 51 (1049). 19 December 1936. ISSN 1392-3862.
- Sireika, Jonas (2011). "Palangos etapas dr. Jono Šliūpo veikloje ir gyvenime" (PDF). Acta humanitarica universitatis Saulensis (in Lithuanian). 12. ISSN 1822-7309.
- Šliūpas, Vytautas (2000). Tėvas, kokį aš prisimenu (PDF) (in Lithuanian). Šiauliai: Šiaulių "Aušros" muziejaus leidykla. ISBN 9986-766-19-2.
- Trumpa, Vincas (1991). "Dr. Jonas Šliūpas — aušrininkas". Aidai (in Lithuanian). 2 (379 (391)). ISSN 0002-208X.
- Vanagaitė, Gitana (2009). "Jono Šliūpo autobiografijos" (PDF). Žmogus ir žodis (in Lithuanian). 2 (11). ISSN 1392-8600. Archived from the original (PDF) on 2016-03-05.
- Vyšniauskas, Arūnas (2011). "Jonas Šliūpas ir LSDP 1896 metais" (PDF). Acta humanitarica universitatis Saulensis (in Lithuanian). 12. ISSN 1822-7309.
- Vytauto Didžiojo universitetas (8 May 2012). "1922 m. įkurto universiteto garbės daktarai" (in Lithuanian).
- Yčas, Martynas (2009). Iš Agaro krašto: 1885–1941 (PDF) (in Lithuanian). Kaunas: Candela. ISBN 978-9986-400-21-9.
- Ziabkus, Alvydas (10 May 2018). "Pusę kurorto nušlavęs gaisras pakeitė Palangos veidą". Lietuvos rytas (in Lithuanian).
