= Aušra =

Lithuanian newspaper

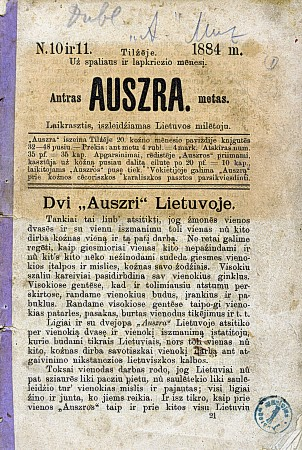
Auszra issues 10 & 11 published in 1884

Aušra or Auszra (literally: Dawn) was the first national Lithuanian newspaper. The first issue was published in 1883 in Ragnit, East Prussia, Germany (the newspaper credited it as Lithuanian: Ragainė), East Prussia's ethnolinguistic part – Lithuania Minor. Later, it was published monthly in Tilsit (present-day Sovetsk). Even though only forty issues were published and circulation did not exceed 1,000, it was a significant event marking the beginning of the Lithuanian national rebirth that eventually resulted in an independent Lithuanian State (1918–1940). This period, between 1883 and 1904, when the Lithuanian press ban was enforced by Tsarist authorities, has been referred to as the Aušros gadynė (the Dawn Period). The printing ceased in 1886 due to financial issues.

== History ==
After the Russian authorities denied permission to publish a Lithuanian newspaper in Vilnius, Jonas Šliūpas proposed to publish it in East Prussia, Germany. However, he was perceived as too radical, and Jurgis Mikšas, the printer, invited Jonas Basanavičius to become its first editor. During its three years of existence, Aušra had five editors. After Mikšas resigned for personal reasons, Šliūpas was entrusted with overseeing future publications. However, he ran into conflicts with Basanavičius, who was living in Bulgaria. Šliūpas also had issues with the German authorities because of his involvement in nationalist movements and had to leave Prussia in 1884. The other editors, Martynas Jankus and Jonas Andziulaitis, did not engage in polemic writing, and the controversies calmed down. Soon, Mikšas ran into debt and could no longer support the newspaper. The printing was discontinued.

After Aušra was discontinued, new Lithuanian-language periodicals appeared. Varpas (literally: The Bell) was a secular newspaper, while Šviesa was a more conservative and religiously oriented publication.

The newspaper was published outside Lithuania proper because of the Lithuanian press ban that had been enforced by the authorities of the Russian Empire since the Uprising in 1863. It was prohibited to publish anything in the Lithuanian language using the Latin alphabet; the government wished to force the people to use the Grazhdanka, a Cyrillic alphabet. Printing in the Latin alphabet was organized abroad, mostly in Lithuania Minor; knygnešiai (literally: book smugglers) would carry the printed materials across the German-Russian border. This was one of the ways Aušra would reach its readers. The other way was in sealed envelopes.

== Content ==
More than 70 people contributed to Aušra. The writers, or Aušrininkai, came from families of well-to-do peasants who began to appear after serfdom was abolished in 1863. Most of the authors received their education in Russian universities and were fluent in Polish. Because of frequent changes in the editorial staff, the newspaper did not have a clear, well-defined agenda. Basanavičius did not envision Aušra as a political publication; in the first issue, he declared that the newspaper would deal only with cultural matters. However, Aušra soon took on a nationalist agenda. Aušra helped to crystallize many ideas about the Lithuanian nation and the definition of a Lithuanian. It started to reject the idea of resurrecting the old Polish–Lithuanian Commonwealth. The authors began to consider an independent Lithuanian nation-state.

It was published on many different subjects, such as agriculture and reports from Lithuanian communities in the United States, but history was the most popular. The foreword of the first issue began with a Latin proverb, Homines historiarum ignari semper sunt pueri, or People ignoring history remain children forever. They built upon the works of Simonas Daukantas, the first historian who wrote the history of Lithuania in Lithuanian and painted an idealized image of the mighty Grand Duchy of Lithuania. Aušra was critical regarding the forceful Polonisation executed by the Polish clergy and Tsarist Russification. One of the main aims of the Aušra editors was to secure the use rights to the Lithuanian language and to revive its prestige.

The newspaper was directed at the intelligentsia and therefore limited its readership. The peasants did not appreciate that Aušra was secular and did not embrace Catholic traditions.
