= Jonas Katelė =

Lithuanian Roman Catholic priest (1831–1908)

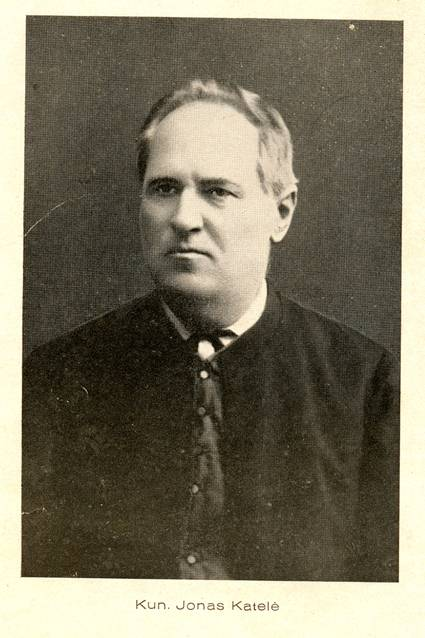
- Born: 13 January 1831; Suvainiai, Russian Empire
- Died: 21 May 1908 (aged 76); Panemunėlis, Russian Empire
- Education: Varniai Priest Seminary
- Occupation: Roman Catholic priest
- Movement: Lithuanian National Revival

Jonas Katelė (13 January 1831 – 21 May 1908) was a Lithuanian Roman Catholic priest active during the Lithuanian National Revival. He is best known for his cultural work in the parish of Panemunėlis where he established a network of clandestine Lithuanian schools.

Educated at the Varniai Priest Seminary, Katelė was ordained priest in 1855 and served as a vicar in different parishes. He became a pastor in Zarasai after his predecessor was exiled due to the participation in the Uprising of 1863. However, according to bishop Motiejus Valančius, Katelė was not successful in the parish and therefore was reassigned to Panemunėlis in 1872 where he worked until his death in 1908.

In Panemunėlis, Katelė started the construction of the red brick Neo-Gothic church which was completed three years after his death. He organized the clandestine Lithuanian schools by finding teachers, providing them with supplies, and conducting frequent check-ins. He sponsored the first Lithuanian math (1885) and geography (1896) textbooks. He distributed the banned Lithuanian publications that were smuggled from East Prussia. Around 1894, Katelė's students established the secret society Žvaigždė which staged the first Lithuanian amateur theater performances. Due to the Russification policies, Katelė's Lithuanian activism was illegal and he faced various fines, but was able to avoid more serious trouble with the Tsarist police.

== Biography ==
=== Early life and education ===
Katelė was born on 13 January [O.S. 1 January] 1831 in Suvainiai near Kupiškis in the present-day northern Lithuania (then part of the Russian Empire). (Note: Katelė was baptized on 1 January 1831, so it is likely that he was born on the last days of December 1830. Some clergy lists indicate his birth year as 1830. However, 1 January 1831 has been commonly cited.) He was the first-born son in a family of Lithuanian peasants who worked land belonging to the sovereign and not a local noble. Therefore, they did not have to perform corvée and could pay levies. This meant that their financial situation was better than of other serfs and they were able to provide education for four out of the five sons in the family.

In 1847, Katelė graduated from a Russian primary school in Kupiškis and enrolled at the School for the Gentry in Panevėžys (present-day Juozas Balčikonis Gymnasium) under the Polonized last name Kociełło. He graduated after five years and enrolled at the Varniai Priest Seminary. His classmates included the future bishop Mečislovas Leonardas Paliulionis.

=== Priesthood ===
Katelė was ordained priest on 17 November 1855 by bishop Motiejus Valančius. In mid-1856, he was assigned as a vicar to Naujamiestis where he served for about four years. It was a parish that the Diocese of Samogitia acquired from the Diocese of Vilnius in 1850. In 1859, he was reassigned to Jūžintai. In February 1861, he was assigned to Dusetos but only after three weeks moved to Zarasai where the pastor was his former classmate Mykolas Skorupskis.

Katelė did not actively participate in the Uprising of 1863, but he gave the last rites to those sentenced to death and witnessed Tsarist brutality which left a deep impression on him. For participating in the uprising, Skorupskis was arrested in February 1864 and exiled to Tomsk Governorate. Therefore, Katelė became the acting pastor of the parish (he was recognized as pastor in 1869). According to notes by Motiejus Valančius, Katelė was not popular among the locals and lacked farming skills. Further, the newly built Church of the Assumption began showing cracks that needed extensive repairs (it was built on wooden foundations). Therefore, Valančius reassigned Katelė to Panemunėlis in November 1872.

=== Panemunėlis ===
==== Church work ====
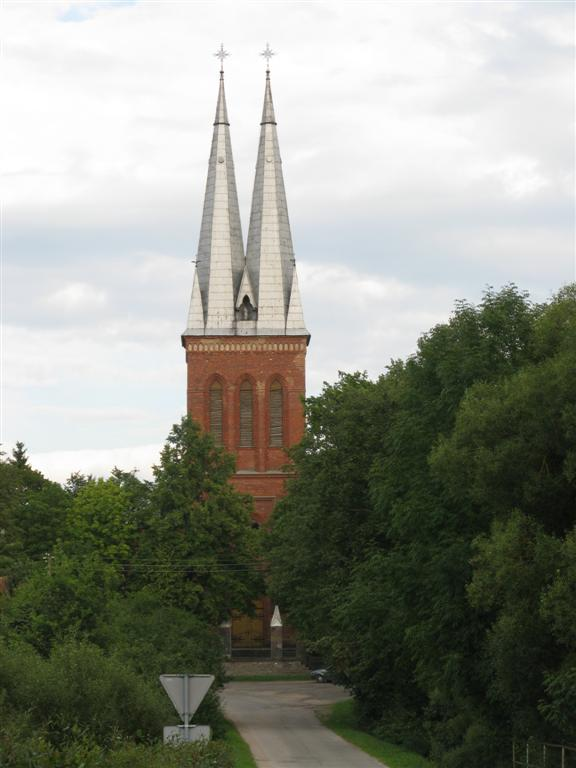
Panemunėlis Church built by Katelė

In Panemunėlis, Katelė found a small dilapidated wooden church and a parish with about 3,000 residents in about 100 villages. The church owned 33 hectares (82 acres) in Naujikai. Katelė planted a garden of fruit trees both in Najikai and near the clergy house. He also built new horse stables (1874) and two-storey clergy house (1880).

The old church needed to be replaced. In 1894, architect Florian Wyganowski prepared a plan for a red brick Neo-Gothic church with a projected cost of 35,000 rubles. In 1896, Tsarist authorities briefly lifted the requirements to obtain permits for new church construction. Using this opportunity, Katelė initiated the construction which started in 1898. Due to financial difficulties, the construction was slow and was completed after Katelė's death. The church was consecrated on 8 May 1911, the third anniversary of his death. The construction left him in debt; his estate was valued at just 600 rubles.

The church held services both in Polish and Lithuanian, and Katelė did not change this until the early 1900s. Influenced by Povilas Dogelis, Katelė began reducing Polish sermons. He did not fully switch to Lithuanian for the benefit of the owners of the Panemunėlis Manor. Katelė instituted the May devotions to the Blessed Virgin Mary. Katelė was not known for his oratory skills. Many of his sermons were about more practical issues – need for education, agricultural advice, hygiene, etc.

In 1906, for Katelė's 50th anniversary of priesthood, he was promoted to honorary canon.

==== Clandestine schools ====
The town had a Lithuanian parish school established in 1854, but it was closed in 1862 when all such schools were banned in the Vilna Educational District. It was replaced by a Russian primary school. Manor owners sisters Jadvyga and Bronislova Stravinskaitė started secretly teaching children of manor workers in Polish; Katelė collaborated with them. This work ceased after Jadvyga's death in 1888, but Katelė continued to receive financial support from her nephew.

Katelė organized the clandestine Lithuanian schools by finding teachers, providing them with supplies, and conducting frequent check-ins. The schools were established not in Panemunėlis, but in neighboring villages (Moškėnai, Tindžiuliai, Šetekšniai, etc.). He visited schools at night to avoid police attention or asked children to bring their work to church on Sunday. To encourage members of his congregation to learn basic literacy skills, he refused the First Communion to illiterate children. He particularly worked with women as future mothers and educators of their children. According to one account, he even threatened to deny matrimony if the woman could not read.

He had to overcome numerous difficulties, including lack of educated people who could teach, teaching materials, and funds, skepticism of residents (e.g. some opposed the idea of teaching women), investigations by the Tsarist police. However, the schools spread and, according to memoirs, almost all parishioners became literate. His students included the future member of the State Duma Juozas Kubilius, intelligence agent Marcelė Kubiliūtė, opera singer Juozas Katelė, first woman judge in Lithuania Elena Jackevičaitė, priest Petras Lapelis, brothers consul Petras Mačiulis and physician Stanislovas Mačiulis, poet Kleopas Jurgelionis, member of the Seimas Kazys Bieliūnas, singer Juozas Bieliūnas.

His schools primarily focused on teaching reading, writing, and basic arithmetic, but also included lessons on history, geography, natural sciences. Katelė also taught in Polish. Because there were no published textbooks, Katelė and his assistants developed handwritten textbooks, often translated from Polish. Such efforts grew into three published books: the first Lithuanian math textbook by Jonas Spudulis and Povilas Matulionis (published in 1885), the first geography textbook by Juozapas Žebrys (published in 1896), and a Lithuanian grammar by Feliksas Sereika based on works by Antanas Baranauskas (published in 1896). Katelė also used a book of moral lessons Škala pavargėlių siratų by Serafinas Laurynas Kušeliauskas (first published in 1887). In summer 1881, Jonas Šliūpas visited Panemunėlis and interviewed about 43 students. He concluded that their education was equivalent to a third-year gymnasium student.

==== Book smuggling ====
Katelė became close with the local residents, visiting their houses, gifting baranki and images of Mary or Jesus to children and Lithuanian books to adults. Lithuanian books were banned from 1864 to 1904, but they were smuggled from East Prussia. Among books distributed by Katelė were a translation of The Imitation of Christ by Thomas à Kempis, novellas Palangos Juzė by Motiejus Valančius and Šiaulėniškis senelis by Juozapas Silvestras Dovydaitis.

He later distributed Lithuanian Catholic periodicals, including Kryžius and Tėvynės sargas. He read but did not distribute secular Varpas and Vienybė lietuvninkų. He received the Lithuanian publication through a network of book smugglers, which included Juozas Otonas Širvydas and Kazys Ūdra (one of the key people of the Garšviai Book Smuggling Society). The publications were kept in several caches, including at the church's farm in Naujikai and house of church's organist. It is estimated that Katelė spent more than 3,000 rubles on the banned Lithuanian press.

==== Amateur theater ====
Around 1894, Katelė and others established the secret society Žvaigždė (Star). It grew to 50 members. Its members collected examples of Lithuanian folklore and shared them with Jonas Basanavičius, organized a small mobile library, and staged amateur theater plays (see: barn theatres in Lithuania). The first play (Nepadėjus nėr ko kasti by Juozas Tumas-Vaižgantas) was performed in Naujikai in summer 1893 and became the first known illegal Lithuanian theater performance. Tumas wrote the play inspired by a satirical song sung by Katelė.

The group staged other plays, mainly simple comedies, in Najikai, the clergy house in Panemunėlis, the barn of Panemunėlis Manor, or in nearby villages. Katelė provided support and funding to the group, though the group was more freethinking and drew sharp criticism as a "godless" bunch from vicar Juozas Šereiva. The group included Juozas Otonas Širvydas, Juozas Kubilius, Juozas Katelė, Jurgis Smolskis, Juozas Tūbelis. The group staged its first legal performance of comedies Amerika pirtyje (America in the Bathhouse) by Keturakis and Neatmezgamas mazgas (The Impossible Knot) by Petras Pundzevičius-Petliukas in Grīva in December 1904 (then part of the Courland Governorate). In 1905, the troupe performed legally in Subate, Panevėžys (twice), Rokiškis, and Kamajai.

==== Polish periodicals ====
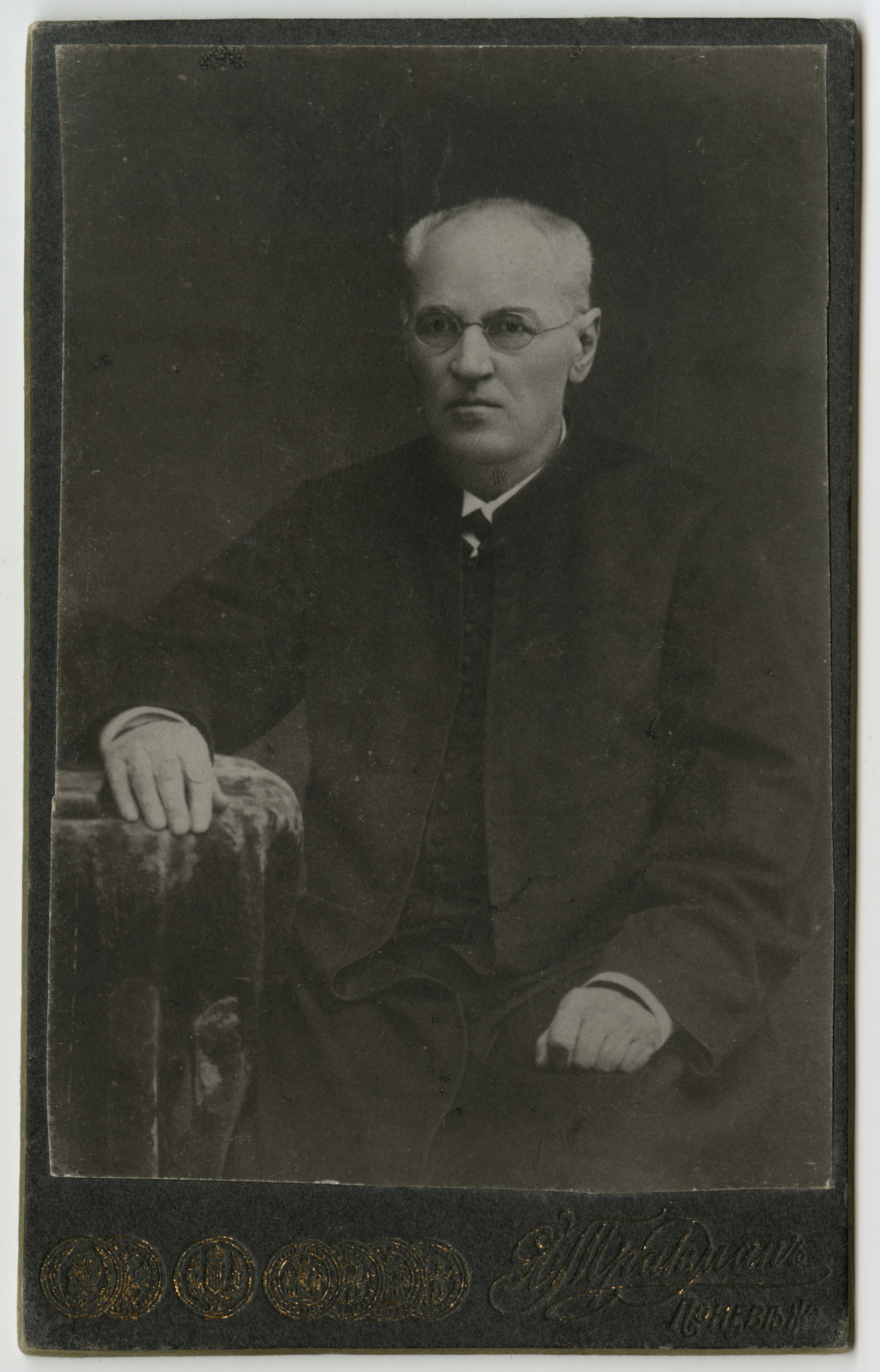
Katelė in his final years

He read Polish Catholic and patriotic periodicals, including Gazeta Warszawska, Słowo, Przegląd Katolicki, Rola. According to Adomas Jakštas, Katelė was seasoned in Polish patriotism and remained Polish–Lithuanian. This brought him into conflict with more ardent Lithuanian activists. For example, when Jonas Jablonskis visited Panemunėlis, he accused Katelė of being a Polonophile and soon left. Juozas Tumas-Vaižgantas criticized Katelė for teaching children in Polish.

Katelė wrote little and did not publish works for the villagers, but encouraged others to do so. His articles were published in Polish periodicals, including Przegląd Katolicki and Słowo. In 1877, he published an articled on priest and poet Antanas Strazdas in Tygodnik Powszechny. This article was translated by Mečislovas Davainis-Silvestraitis and published in Aušra. Katelė wrote a manuscript in Polish Anna pod Krzyżem (Anna under Cross). After Katelė's death, it was investigated by Michał Pius Römer but he decided not to publish it.

==== Other cultural work ====
Katelė did not consume alcohol and urged others to abstain, but did not establish a local chapter of a temperance society that was popular in Lithuania. He was a heavy smoker.

Katelė liked music and organized informal musical gatherings at the clergy house. He owned a piano and trained his nephew Juozas Katelė to play a violin.

He collected books, coins, archaeological artifacts. He amassed a library of about 3,000 Polish, Russian, German, Latin, French books – mostly works of fiction and religious texts. He also owned several handwritten copies of Lithuanian texts, including poems of Antanas Baranauskas, Antanas Strazdas, Antanas Vienažindys. His collections were dispersed after his death and majority of his books were burned in 1944.

Katelė was visited by many Lithuanian activists and intellectuals, including Maironis (he wrote the first part of the trilogy Kęstučio mirtis in Panemunėlis), Juozas Tumas-Vaižgantas, Jonas Jablonskis, Antanas Smetona, Adomas Jakštas, Povilas Matulionis, Michał Pius Römer, Jonas Basanavičius, Kazimieras Jokantas, Jonas Šliūpas, Michał Eustachy Brensztein.

==== Troubles with police ====
Tsarist officials started gathering evidence against Katelė in 1876. That year, the Tsarist police searched the clergy house or residences of Katelė's associates but was unable to find evidence or witnesses of Katelė's Lithuanian activities. Nevertheless, he was placed under the police supervision. Katelė's personal correspondence was checked by the post master. He was prohibited from leaving his parish, and received 50-ruble fines in 1889 and 1895 for visiting Rokiškis and Kvetkai without a permit. Katelė refused to pay the fines and the police then organized auctions of his property. He was briefly jailed in 1902 for agitating for a forceful removal of a peasant from Panemunėlis. However, he was able to keep friendly relationship with the post master or otherwise bribe policemen thus avoiding a more serious trouble.

In November 1887, Aleksandras Štombergas was assigned as Katelė's vicar and as religion teacher at the Russian primary school. Štombergas refused to use Lithuanian prayer books printed in the Cyrillic script. As a result, he was reassigned to the Courland Governorate in March 1889.

In 1900, Povilas Dogelis was assigned as a vicar to Panemunėlis. He came into conflict with the Russian teacher of the local primary school because he refused to teach religion in Russian. Parents then withdrew their children from the school. For inciting the strike, Dogelis was sent to Kretinga Monastery, while Katelė received admonishment from the minister of interior Vyacheslav von Plehve. Dogelis was replaced by Juozas Šereiva who openly spoke against secret societies in the parish, informed the Tsarist police about the Žvaigždė Society, and promoted violence against those who read godless books. This made Katelė more cautious and skeptical.

During the Russian Revolution of 1905, people closed down several Russian primary schools. The school in Panemunėlis was closed in mid-December 1905. People were agitated by Jurgis Smolskis and other more radical socialist activists. Therefore, Katelė invited the more moderate Ernestas Galvanauskas to Panemunėlis to calm the people.

=== Death ===
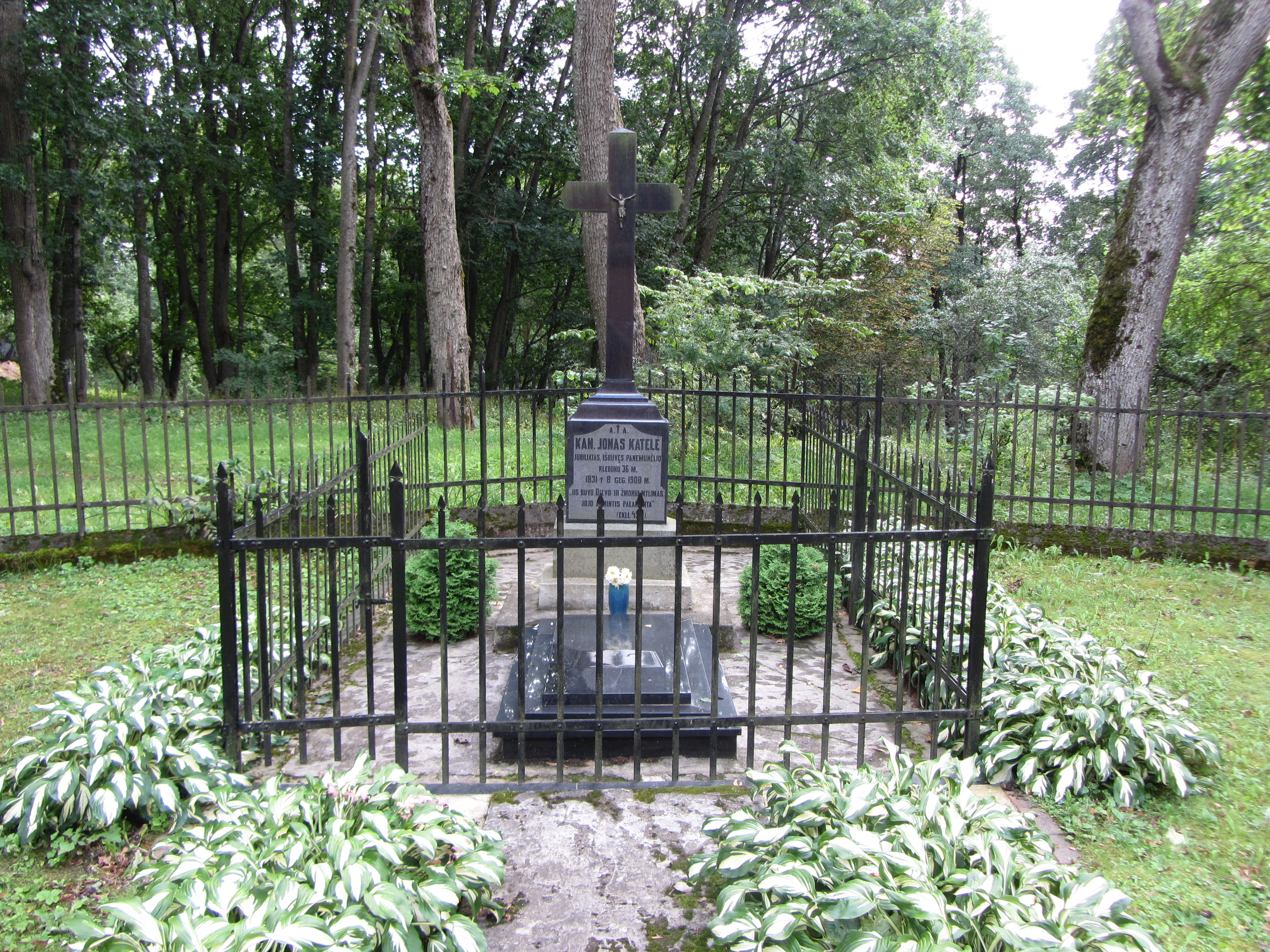
Grave of Katelė

Katelė's health started deteriorating in the late 1890s. By 1900, he could no longer visit the parishioners. He complained of general weakness, shortness of breath, intestinal inflammation, and later of cardiac sclerosis. He became bedridden in late 1907 and died on 21 May [O.S. 8 May] 1908. He was buried the churchyard of Panemunėlis Church. His tombstone was sponsored by the owner of Panemunėlis Manor who engraved the Biblical quote "Loved by God and people alike, his memory is blessed" (Sirach 45:1) in Lithuanian in front and Polish in the back. The grave was added to the Registry of Cultural Property in 1993.

== Legacy ==
In 1933, Katelė's 25th death anniversary was commemorated by the publishers of the biweekly magazine Tautos mokykla. The same year, Panemunėlis primary school and library were named after Katelė. Vytautas Pranas Bičiūnas published Katelė's biography in 1934.

Katelė was not commemorated during the Soviet period, but an expedition was organized in 1979 to collect testimonies and memories of local residents about Katelė.

Katelė was remembered again after Lithuania regained independence in 1990. In 1991, regional librarians in Rokiškis, Zarasai, and Kupiškis organized a commemoration of Katelė's 160th birth anniversary. A small memorial museum was opened at the Panemunėlis primary school in 1993 and the school was renamed in his honor in 1995. However, the school and the museum were closed in 2000.

In 2011, a charitable fund of Katelė was established. It initiated the reconstruction of the former clergy house, where Katelė's memorial museum was reestablished in 2016. A traditional Lithuanian wooden sculpture of Katelė by sculptor Vidmantas Zakarka was installed in front of the former clergy house. The fund also established a youth theater troupe which staged several plays, including two plays inspired by Katelė's life and work. In 2011, bishop Jonas Kauneckas established the annual Jonas Katelė Prize for the best Lithuanian amateur theater.

== Bibliography ==
- Aleknienė, Violeta (2004). "Aukštaitijos svieto budintojas, švietėjas kunigas Jonas Katelė (1831–1908)". In Klimavičius, Raimundas (ed.). Lietuviškos spaudos atgavimo šimtmetis: praeities ir dabarties sąsajos (PDF) (in Lithuanian). Panevėžys: Panevėžio apskrities Gabrielės Petkevičaitės-Bitės viešoji biblioteka. ISBN 9955-412-79-8.
- Aleknienė, Violeta (2011). "Panemunėlio Jono Katelės mokykla". In Mačiekus, Venantas (ed.). Panemunėlis (PDF). Lietuvos valsčiai (in Lithuanian). Vol. 22. Vilnius: Versmė. pp. 538–583. ISBN 978-609-8148-06-0.
- Aleknienė, Violeta (2025). "Neįminta Panemunėlio krašto mįslė" (PDF). Prie Nemunėlio (in Lithuanian). 54 (2): 28–49. ISSN 1822-6221.
- Baltmiškė, Karolina (26 August 2024). "Panemunėlio krašto legenda – švietėjas kunigas Jonas Katelė". Mano kraštas (in Lithuanian).
- Bičiūnas, Vytautas Pranas (1934). Kun. Jonas Katelė ir jo laikai (in Lithuanian). Kaunas: kun. J. Katelės mirties sukaktuvėms minėti komitetas.
- Bielskis, Petras (24 January 2025). "Krivūlėn suskrenda vis į kitą teatru pagarsėjusį miestelį ar kaimą". XXI amžius (in Lithuanian). Vol. 3–4, no. 2616–2617.
- Dambrauskas-Jakštas, Aleksandras (1930). Užgesę žiburiai (in Lithuanian). Kaunas: Lietuvių katalikų mokslo akademija.
- Kultūros paveldo departamentas. "Švietėjo, draudžiamosios lietuviškos spaudos platinimo ir slaptųjų lietuvių mokyklų organizatoriaus kunigo Jono Katelės kapas". Kultūros vertybių registras (in Lithuanian).
- Levandavičiūtė, Ona (2014). Dievui, parapijai, Lietuvai: kunigo švietėjo Jono Katelės biografinė apybraiža (PDF) (in Lithuanian). Margi raštai. ISBN 978-9986-09-455-5.
- Merkys, Vytautas (1994). Knygnešių laikai 1864–1904 (in Lithuanian). Vilnius: Valstybinis leidybos centras. ISBN 9986-09-018-0.
- Misius, Kazys (2016). "1905–1906 metų revoliucijos įvykiai Kamajuose". In Mačiekus, Venantas (ed.). Kamajai (PDF). Lietuvos valsčiai (in Lithuanian). Vol. 31. Vilnius: Versmė. pp. 184–195. ISBN 978-609-8148-41-1.
- Misius, Kazys (2011). "Dokumentai ir atsiminimai apie kunigą Joną Katelę". In Mačiekus, Venantas (ed.). Panemunėlis (PDF). Lietuvos valsčiai (in Lithuanian). Vol. 22. Vilnius: Versmė. pp. 431–452. ISBN 978-609-8148-06-0.
- Prašmantaitė, Aldona (2014). 1863 metų sukilimas ir Katalikų Bažnyčia Lietuvoje (in Lithuanian). Vilnius: Lietuvos istorijos instituto leidykla. ISBN 9789955847878.
- Tumas-Vaižgantas, Juozas (2005). Čiužauskaitė, Ilona (ed.). Raštai (in Lithuanian). Vol. 16: Literatūros istorija, 1896–1933. Lietuvių literatūros ir tautosakos institutas. ISBN 9955-698-00-4.
- Vasiliauskienė, Aldona (22 February 2016). "Minint 185-erius kun. Jono Katelės gimimo metus". Lietuvos aidas (in Lithuanian).
- Zibolienė, Dalia (6 December 2016). "Kunigo švietėjo Jono Katelės labdaros ir paramos fondas tęsia dvasininko darbus ir puoselėtas tradicijas". Gimtasis Rokiškis (in Lithuanian).
