= Clandestine Lithuanian schools =

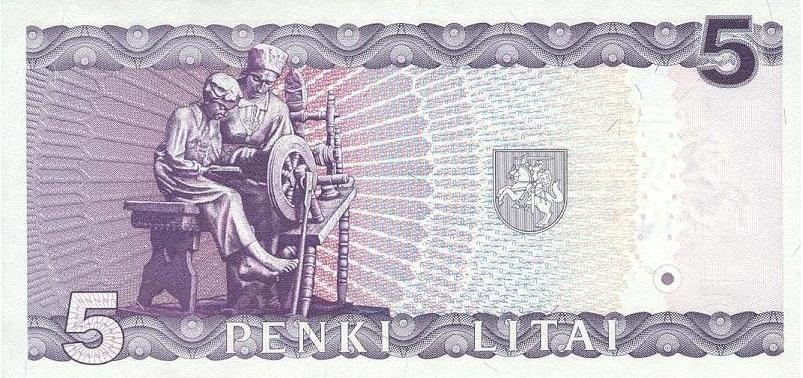
Sculpture "School of Hardship" by Petras Rimša on the 5 litas banknote depicts a mother teaching her child to read while spinning a yarn

The clandestine Lithuanian schools (Lithuanian: slaptoji mokykla or daraktorinė mokykla) were illegal primary schools organized primarily in the Kovno Governorate, and to the lesser extent in Vilna and Suwałki Governorates, of the Russian Empire during the Lithuanian press ban (1864–1904). They were taught by teachers known as daraktorius. It was a form of resistance to the Russification policies enacted after the failed January Uprising of 1863 against the Russian Empire.

All private schools in the Vilna Educational District were outlawed in December 1862. The intent was to replace them with government-sponsored primary schools that would teach in Russian and would promote the Eastern Orthodox Church thus facilitating Russification. Lithuanians, encouraged by the Catholic clergy, boycotted such schools and organized their own clandestine schools that taught basic literacy skills in Lithuanian. Such schools were illegal and persecuted by the Tsarist police. Based on available data, from 1872 to 1906, the Tsarist police discovered 349 clandestine schools in the Kovno Governorate and 332 schools in the Vilna Governorate. Based on the "temporary rules" of April 1892, school teachers and hosts faced the maximum punishment of 300 rubles or 3 months in prison. Despite prosecution, clandestine schools were wide spread which is reflected in relatively high literacy rates in the area.

In the context of the Russian Revolution of 1905, private schools were allowed again on 1 May 1905, however clandestine schools are known to have continued until World War I.

== Closure of private schools ==
Russian-language education in the Western Krai was introduced gradually from the beginning of the 19th century. Following the collapse of the November Uprising, it was already present throughout the region, primarily in the form of secondary schools, while the number of Russian-language elementary schools remained small.

In 1850s, Lithuania had several types of primary schools. Education in native language was allowed only in private parish schools which were attached to nearly every church. Such schools were primarily intended to teach the Catholic catechism and were particularly promoted by the bishop of Samogitia Motiejus Valančius. Some of these schools were organized by local nobles. In 1857, Kovno Governorate had 197 private parish schools with about 6,000 students. Such schools increased in number after the emancipation reform of 1861 which effectively abolished serfdom.

Since Lithuania lived in pre-uprising moods and the private schools harbored anti-Tsarist teachers, the Governor-General of Vilna ordered to close all private schools in the Vilna Educational District, that were opened without an official permission and where the Polish language and Catholic religion were being taught, on 23 December 1862. This order did not apply to the Suwałki Governorate (then part of the Congress Poland) where private schools continued to operate (though, according to press reports, Tsarist police started persecuting private schools at the end of the 19th century).

== Government schools ==
Legal primary schools as of 1 January 1893
School type	Vilna Governorate		Kovno Governorate	
School type	Schools	Students	Schools	Students
Primary schools of the Ministry of National Education	218	14,232	340	22,960
Other lower properly organized educational institutions	7	602	20	1,329
Church parochial schools	50	2,003	62	2,871
Non-Orthodox confessional schools	661	13,741	257	5,808
Literacy schools run by Orthodox clergy	390	5,348	696	14,387
Total	1,326	35,926	1,375	47,355

The emancipation reform necessitated a reform to educate the masses of newly freed serfs. Therefore, in January 1862, Tsar Alexander II of Russia issued an order to organize people's primary schools. The Uprising of 1863 delayed the opening of the people's primary schools by a year or two. In 1864–1866, Kovno Governorate opened about 150 such schools.

In March 1863, the Tsar ordered for the people's primary schools to teach in Russian, except for catechism which could be taught in the native language (Tsarist officials pressured to teach the catechism in Russian as well). In January 1864, governor-general Mikhail Muravyov-Vilensky declared that using Polish language was a "political manifestation" and forbade its use in schools. Further, during 1864–1865, Tsarist authorities developed a long-term Russification program that included the Lithuanian press ban. The teachers could not be the unreliable Catholics; they had to be Russians or Orthodox priests. Recognizing the needs of the Lithuanian population, the Tsarist officials did not immediately prohibit teaching Lithuanian, though it had to be taught in the Cyrillic script and not the traditional Latin alphabet. In practice, Russian teachers did not speak Lithuanian and thus could not teach it.

Lithuanians started boycotting Russian primary schools and stopped paying taxes for their upkeep. Government schools were relatively few. While the number of primary schools grew by ten times in the empire between 1856 and 1896, it remained nearly flat in Lithuania. In 1897, there was one legal primary school for every 5,783 residents in the Kovno Governorate (every 1,412 residents in the Vilna Governorate). Additionally, government schools were expensive for a student to attend (clandestine schools were cheaper). The legal schools were to be financed by the people; the government provided very little if any funding. For example, in 1889, the state budget provided only 4,400 rubles to schools in Kovno Governorate, while local residents paid 76,787 rubles.

For the first decade, teachers were brought in from other parts of the empire; they were criticized as "half illiterate" and of low morality. The Panevėžys Teachers' Seminary, which admitted only Eastern Orthodox believers, was opened only in 1872. The quality of education at the government schools was low; most students needed additional tutoring before they could continue their education at gymnasiums. Additionally, the government schools promoted the Eastern Orthodox Church which was against the Roman Catholic faith of the majority of Lithuanians. Other religious groups (Jews, Old Believers, Lutherans) also organized their own education.

== Clandestine schools ==
=== Organization ===
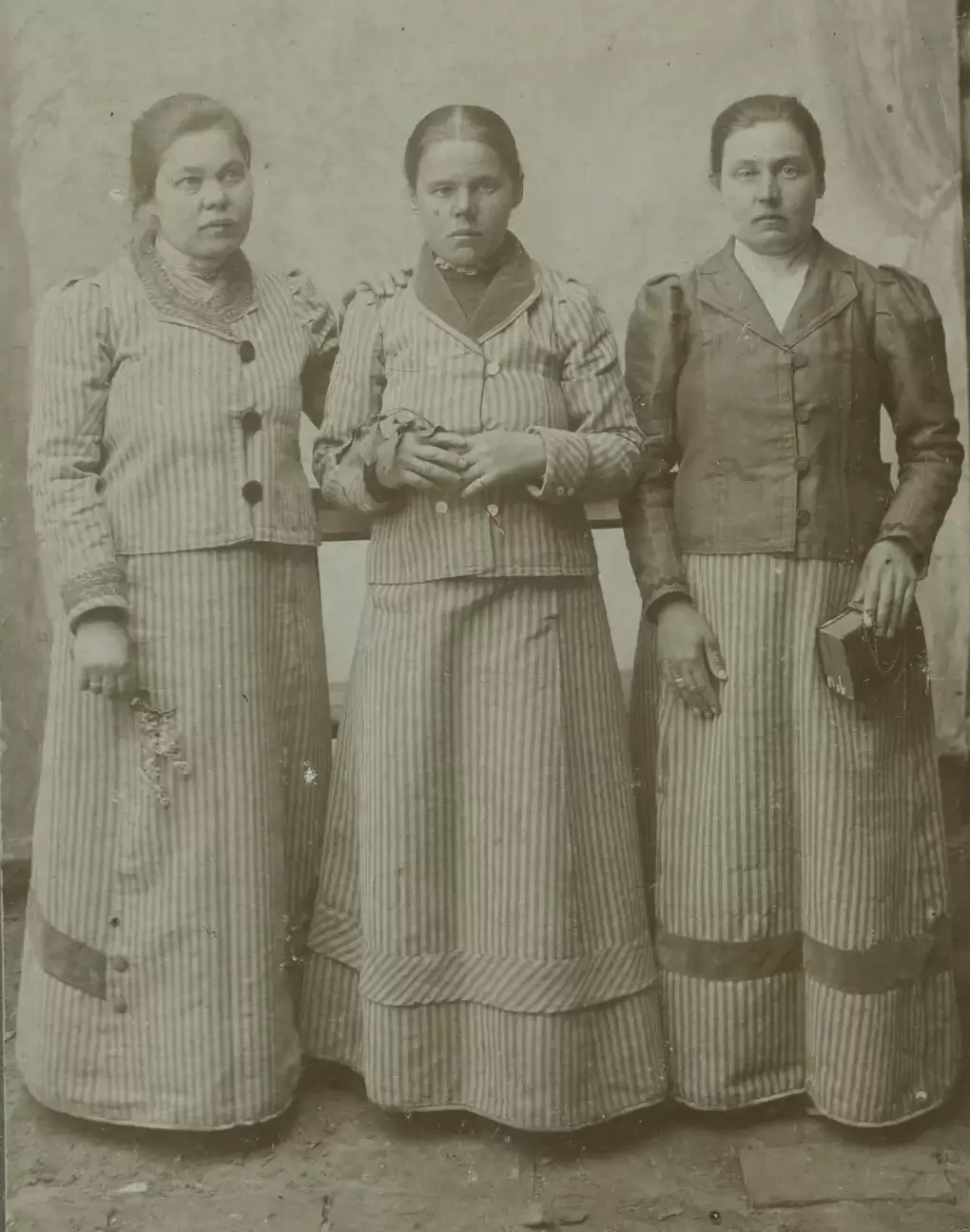
Women teachers of the clandestine Lithuanian schools

The first clandestine Lithuanian schools appeared in 1864–1866. However, the tradition of teaching children to read was not new. Informal, semi-legal village schools (known as bakalorija) existed before. Some of the closed private schools reorganized into the clandestine schools. Some of the clandestine schools were organized by the clergy who saw the need to continue religious education. In many places, priests required children to be able to read before they received the First Communion. Clandestine schools were promoted by activists of the Lithuanian National Revival who published various articles on the topic in the banned Lithuanian press, e.g. in Aušra, Varpas, Ūkininkas.

Lithuanian attendance at the official primary schools dropped significantly after the Kražiai massacre in 1893. In 1902, Bishop of Vilna Stefan Aleksander Zwierowicz published a letter urging Catholics to withdraw their children from Eastern Orthodox schools. As a result, he was exiled from the diocese while about 2,000 children dropped out from the Russian schools.

Initially, the children were tutored one-on-one at home by friends or relatives, but it was more efficient for several parents to come together and hire a teacher (known as daraktorius from Polish dyrektor or "director"). Such schools were cheaper, closer, and overall more convenient for the parents and the students than the government schools. The schools usually had 10–15 children ages 6–15 who studied for three to six months per year. However, there were larger schools with as many as 40 students. Some schools continued during summer, particularly when herding farm animals. Students usually attended the clandestine schools for one to four years.

=== Curriculum and conditions ===
The main purpose of the clandestine schools was to teach reading, specifically reading printed texts so that the children could read prayer books. Reading was taught by the rote memorization of syllable by syllable (slebizavimas). Children had to memorize 350 syllables. Then they were taught writing, counting, and religion. Writing was seen as important to boys so that they could deal with government paperwork or write letters if conscripted to the military; it was not seen as important for girls.

Occasionally, the clandestine schools taught other subjects, such as basic arithmetic, drawing, penmanship, history, geography. Majority of the schools also taught Russian or Polish languages. According to data collected by the historian Vytautas Merkys, the Tsarist police discovered 130 clandestine schools in 1883–1904 that taught the Lithuanian language. Of those schools, 58 taught only Lithuanian, while others taught a combination of Lithuanian, Polish, and Russian. Overall, the quality of the education was low due to primitive conditions and lack of qualifications among the teachers.

The schools usually met at a house of one of the parents. Occasionally, the schools rented rooms or used the home of its teacher (this was more common in towns). Due to their clandestine nature, the schools did not have specialized furniture or equipment. For example, instead of a blackboard many schools used doors or headboards. Students used primitive supplies, such as quills made from geese feathers, home-made ink, clay or wooden tablets. Misbehaving students were subject to corporal punishment, for example, kneeling on gravel, standing in a corner, strikes with a ruler, or wearing a tablet of shame.

=== Teachers ===
Teachers were usually peasants who were self-taught or who graduated from government primary schools. After the abolition of serfdom, many peasants lost their land and searched for employment. One of the available jobs was teaching children which usually provided free housing, food, and payment of 0.5 to 1 ruble per student per month. However, such jobs were only available during the winter months. For some teachers it was the only way of making a living due to disabilities. Sometimes teachers were better educated, e.g. dropouts from priest seminaries or Veiveriai Teachers' Seminary, former soldiers, or church organists. Many of the teachers were women.

There were some efforts to improve teachers' competencies. Courses for teachers were organized in Kupiškis and Subačius. Priest Jonas Katelė in Panemunėlis organized clandestine schools and taught their teachers. Teachers often had contacts with the Lithuanian book smugglers or were smugglers themselves.

A few prominent Lithuanian activists worked as teachers in the clandestine schools, including Gabrielė Petkevičaitė‑Bitė, Povilas Višinskis, Jonas Biliūnas, Marija Kuraitytė-Varnienė.

=== Textbooks ===
The clandestine schools used various available texts to teach children to read. Some were able to obtain Lithuanian alphabet books (either published before the press ban or smuggled from East Prussia). Others used prayer books or Polish primers. Occasionally, schools used government-sponsored Lithuanian primers printed in the Cyrillic script.

Notable alphabet books were published by Motiejus Brundza (1859), which was particularly popular in Suvalkija, and Mikalojus Akelaitis (1860). The first modernized primer was published by Liudmila Malinauskaitė-Šliūpienė and Jonas Šliūpas in 1884. It replaced traditional religious texts with secular ones, but did not offer pedagogical novelties. Varpas held a contest for a new primer; it was won by Antanas Kriščiukaitis who introduced the synthetic phonics in 1895. In total, about half a million of Lithuanian alphabet books were printed in East Prussia in 1864–1896.

Lithuanian activists wrote and published other books specifically for the clandestine schools. Bishop Motiejus Valančius published a collection of short stories for children in 1867. He also wrote Pasakojimas Antano tretininko in 1872 though it was published only in 1891. It promoted clandestine schools and served as an instruction to the teachers. The first Lithuanian math textbook was published by Jonas Spudulis and Povilas Matulionis in 1885. Petras Vileišis published textbooks on arithmetic, geometry, history, and crafts in 1886–1903. Juozapas Žebrys published the first geography textbook in 1896, though it was not well received. Jonas Jablonskis and Petras Avižonis published a Lithuanian grammar in 1901.

== Persecution ==
The clandestine schools often promoted anti-Tsarist ideas and, therefore, were targeted by the Tsarist police. The schools sometimes kept meeting at different homes to avoid police attention. Both teachers and students took measures to confuse the police. For example, in case of a police raid, students had some craft on hand so they could show they were working and not learning. Teachers also pretended to be workers or came up with other explanations of their presence in the household; e.g. they quickly dressed in wondering beggar's clothes. In one known instance, a clandestine school near Žemaitkiemis met at night between midnight and 8 a.m.

If a clandestine school was discovered by the police, its teacher and host faced fines and prison time. Governor-General Mikhail Muravyov-Vilensky suggested the fines at 200–600 rubles. The fines were imposed administratively based on martial law which was in effect until 1872. When the martial law was lifted, teachers and hosts had to be tried by a judge. However, many such cases resulted in acquittals due to lack of evidence or very low fines of 0.25 to 2 rubles. According to a report from 1883, the Tsarist police discovered 126 clandestine schools in the Kovno Governorate in 1872–1882, but their organizers faced punishments only in 25 cases. In Vilna Governorate, the police discovered 225 clandestine schools and punishments were delt out in 63 cases.

As a result of this report, the Governor-General of Vilna suggested to amend Russian laws to allow stricter punishments for clandestine schools. After a lengthy bureaucratic correspondence, such amendments were proposed by the Council of Ministers of the Russian Empire and approved by the Tsar as "temporary rules" in April 1892. These rules were extended to the Congress of Poland in May 1900. The temporary rules provided the maximum punishment of 300 rubles or 3 months in prison. The punishment applied not only to the teachers and the hosts, but also to the parents of the students. The prison time applied when the accused could not pay the fine. The rules applied to religious teaching in churches, but exempted tutoring by members of the same household. However, the punishments were applied inconsistently and varied between 1 ruble to 300 rubles, though most fines were under 25 rubles.

Based on available data, from 1872 to 1906, the Tsarist police discovered 349 clandestine schools in the Kovno Governorate and 332 schools in the Vilna Governorate. Not all of these schools were Lithuanian; many schools taught in Polish or Belarusian. Due to the strict application of the law, the number included a few schools established by the clergy of the Eastern Orthodox Church. Between 1871 and 1878, 194 illegal schools were uncovered in the Vilna Educational District. Of these, 145 were located in the Vilna Governorate: 121 were Polish schools, 16 Russian, 7 Jewish, and 1 Lithuanian. In the Kovno Governorate, 14 illegal schools were discovered, including 5 Lithuanian schools and 6 Lithuanian-Polish schools. Overall, of the 194 illegal schools uncovered, 67 were run by teachers of peasant origin, while 25 were taught by members of the nobility. Peasant children attended 145 of these schools, most pupils was coming from the petty nobility.

Vytautas Merkys analyzed records of schools discovered in 1883–1904. He counted 126 Lithuanian schools among 223 schools in Kovno Governorate and only four schools among 107 schools in Vilna Governorate. The police discovered a small percentage of clandestine schools; Merkys estimated that there were as many as 4,800 clandestine schools in Kovno and Vilna Governorates.

== End of clandestine schools ==
The Lithuanian press ban was lifted in May 1904. During the Russian Revolution of 1905, revolutionaries closed about 130 or half of government schools in the Kovno Governorate. A handful of government schools were taken over by the Lithuanian teachers of the clandestine schools. On 1 May 1905, primary schools were allowed to teach in the Lithuanian language. Additionally, Lithuanians could now be admitted the Panevėžys Teachers Seminary and could be employed in Kovno and Vilna Governorates. Penalties for organizing or supporting clandestine schools were officially abolished in August 1906. However, the Tsarist administration did not hurry to implement the reforms. For example, in 1906, only six Lithuanians were hired in Kovno Governorate. Before World War I, Lithuanian teachers made up about 20% of all teachers in the governorate.

Lithuanians organized societies Saulė in the Kovno Governorate, Žiburys in the Suwałki Governorate, and (after a delay) Rytas in the Vilna Governorate to fund and operate Lithuanian primary schools. However, clandestine schools continued to exist since government schools continued to teach in Russian and legal Lithuanian schools were slow to organize. Clandestine schools are known to have existed until at least 1916. The penalties for clandestine schools were reinstated in January 1911.

== Literacy rates ==
Literacy rates according to the Russian Empire census of 1897
Age group	Kovno Governorate			Vilna Governorate		
Age group	Men	Women	Total	Men	Women	Total
1–9	6.2%	5.7%	5.7%	5.5%	3.6%	4.5%
10–19	53.8%	55.5%	54.7%	48.2%	35.8%	41.8%
20–29	65.2%	66.7%	65.9%	54.0%	37.8%	45.8%
30–39	64.3%	59.7%	61.9%	51.6%	31.0%	41.2%
40–49	58.7%	50.4%	54.4%	45.1%	22.7%	33.9%
50–59	50.7%	40.1%	45.3%	33.4%	16.8%	25.2%
60+	34.5%	26.3%	30.4%	24.6%	13.1%	19.3%
Overall	42.8%	41.1%	41.9%	34.8%	23.0%	28.8%

According to the Russian Empire census of 1897, Kovno Governorate had 267 official primary schools with 13,808 students (which was just 8.6% of primary school aged children). In this regard, the governorate ranked last among the governorates of European Russia. According to official reports, a large percentage of new students at government schools already knew how to read. Vilna Governorate, which had similar total population but it was ethnically mixed, had 785 primary schools with 25,643 students (16.4% of children). However, the literacy rates were much higher than the official school attendance – about 54% of people aged 10–19 in the Kovno Governorate claimed to be literate.

This trend of higher literacy rates than official school attendance is particularly evident among women. In the Kovno Governorate, literacy rates among Lithuanian women were similar or even slightly higher than of men, while women's literacy lagged significantly in the rest of the empire (32.6% vs. 13.7% in the European Russia in 1897). The parity was achieved even though the girls were a minority in the official schools. Out of 47,355 primary school students in the Kovno Governorate in 1893, only 7,503 or 15.8% were women. Out of the discovered clandestine schools, girls were also in the minority. The high literacy rate among women reflected the fact that women, particularly the mothers, were the primary teachers of children and the wide spread of clandestine education.

However, in the Kovno Governorate, the younger generation (ages 10–19) had 11.2% lower literacy rates than the previous generation (ages 20–29). Researcher A. S. Stražas has attributed the decrease to the negative effects of Russification and boycott of the official primary schools.

The relatively high literacy rates were instrumental in helping to spread the ideas of the Lithuanian National Revival. Literate public also build a market for Lithuanian publications. Despite the Lithuanian press ban, the number of Lithuanian periodicals and books steadily grew.

== Bibliography ==
- Aleksandravičius, Egidijus; Kulakauskas, Antanas (1996). Carų valdžioje: XIX amžiaus Lietuva (in Lithuanian). Vilnius: Baltos lankos. ISBN 9986403693.
- Balkelis, Tomas (2009). The Making of Modern Lithuania. BASEES/Routledge Series on Russian and East European Studies. Routledge. ISBN 978-0-415-45470-4.
- Banionis, Juozas (2014). Matematinės minties raida Lietuvoje: nuo matematikos žinijos atsiradimo iki matematikos mokslo įsitvirtinimo (in Lithuanian). Vilnius: Lietuvos edukologijos universiteto leidykla. ISBN 9789955209607.
- Bičiūnas, Vytautas Pranas (1934). Kun. Jonas Katelė ir jo laikai (in Lithuanian). Kaunas: kun. J. Katelės mirties sukaktuvėms minėti komitetas.
- Čepėnas, Pranas (1977). Naujųjų laikų Lietuvos istorija. Vol. I. Chicago: Dr. Kazio Griniaus Fondas. OCLC 3220435.
- Karčiauskienė, Magdalena (1989). Pradinio švietimo raida Lietuvoje XIXa. antroje pusėje ir XXa. pradžioje (in Lithuanian). Kaunas: Šviesa. ISBN 5-430-00447-2.
- Karčiauskienė, Magdalena; Lukšienė, Meilė; Žukauskas, Kazys; et al. (1983). Vaitkevičius, Juozas; et al. (eds.). Lietuvos mokyklos ir pedagoginės minties istorijos bruožai (Ligi Didžiosios Spalio socialistinės revoliucijos) (PDF) (in Lithuanian). Vilnius: Mokslas. OCLC 17298949.
- Levandavičiūtė, Ona (2014). Dievui, parapijai, Lietuvai: kunigo švietėjo Jono Katelės biografinė apybraiža (PDF) (in Lithuanian). Margi raštai. ISBN 978-9986-09-455-5.
- Merkys, Vytautas (1994). Knygnešių laikai 1864–1904 (in Lithuanian). Vilnius: Valstybinis leidybos centras. ISBN 9986-09-018-0.
- Mickevičienė, Danutė (2019). "Lietuvių kultūrinė raiška spaudos draudimo metais" (PDF). Homo-societas-technologiae (in Lithuanian). 1 (6): 64–72. ISSN 2029-9737.
- Sergeenkova, V. V.; Ershova, O. I.; Gulyuk, M. A.; Sharaeva, E. I. (2008). Виленский учебный округ: политика российского правительства в области образования (вторая половина XIX — начало XX в.). Российские и славянские исследования (in Russian). 3. Archived from the original on 4 March 2016.
- Staliūnas, Darius (2005). "Kaip rusai pedagogai XIX a. viduryje mokėsi lietuvių kalbos" (PDF). Lietuvos istorijos metraštis (in Lithuanian). 2: 93–115. ISSN 2538-6549.
- Staliūnas, Darius (2007). Making Russians: Meaning and Practice of Russification in Lithuania and Belarus after 1863. Amsterdam: Rodopi. ISBN 978-90-420-2267-6.
- Stražas, A. S. (Fall 1996). "Lithuania 1863–1893: Tsarist Russification and the Beginnings of the Modern Lithuanian National Movement". Lituanus. 3 (42). Translated by Sužiedėlis, Saulius.
- Troynitsky, N. A., ed. (1905). Общий свод по Империи результатов разработки данных первой всеобщей переписи населения, произведенной 28 января 1897 года (in Russian). Vol. I. Saint Petersburg: Steam Type-Litography N. L. Nyrkin.
- Tyla, Antanas (1990). "Slaptas lietuvių mokymas 1862–1906 metais" (PDF). Lietuvių Atgimimo istorijos studijos (in Lithuanian): 47–66.
- Vaitekūnas, Stasys (2011). Justinas Staugaitis: vyskupas, politikas, tautos dvasios ir valstybės puoselėtojas (in Lithuanian). Vilnius: Mokslo ir enciklopedijų leidybos centras. ISBN 9785420016923.
- Vėbra, Rimantas (1992). Lietuvių tautinis atgimimas XIX amžiuje (in Lithuanian). Kaunas: Šviesa. ISBN 5-430-01745-0.
- Virvičienė, Aušra (30 March 2013). "Naujas Lietuvių švietimo draugijos "Rytas" šimtmetis". Voruta (in Lithuanian). 7 (771). ISSN 2029-3534.
- "slaptoji mokykla". Visuotinė lietuvių enciklopedija (in Lithuanian). Mokslo ir enciklopedijų leidybos centras. 29 September 2023 [2019].
- Weeks, Theodore R. (Spring 2001). "Russification and the Lithuanians, 1863–1905". Slavic Review. 60 (1): 96–114. JSTOR 2697645.
- Zasztowt, Leszek (1996). "Nielegalne szkoły w Wileńskim Okręgu Naukowym w latach siedemdziesiątych XIX w." [Illegal Schools in the Vilna Educational District in the 1870s] (PDF). Rozprawy z Dziejów Oświaty. 37: 119–143. ISSN 0080-4754.
- Žukauskas, K. (1973). "Apie slaptąjį mokymą Lietuvoje". Lietuvos TSR aukštųjų mokyklų mokslo darbai. Pedagogika ir psichologija (in Lithuanian). 12: 155–162. doi:10.15388/Psichol.1972.12.9273.
