= Marija Kuraitytė-Varnienė =

Lithuanian educator

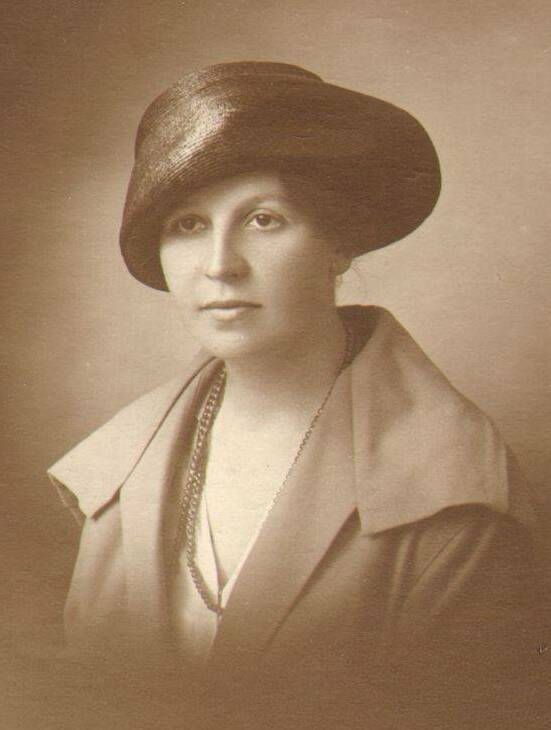
- Marija Kuraitytė-Varnienė in 1915–1917
- Born: Marija Kuraitytė; 26 August 1886; Bakaičiai, Russian Empire
- Died: 10 October 1982 (aged 96); Chicago, United States
- Education: University of Geneva; Moscow City People's University
- Occupation: Educator
- Spouse: Adomas Varnas

Marija Kuraitytė-Varnienė (26 August 1886 – 10 October 1982) was a Lithuanian educator best known as the pioneer of the Montessori education in Lithuania.

Born to a family of petty Lithuanian nobles, she was educated at various Russian institutions. At the University of Geneva, she became interested in pedagogy. In particular, she was interested in early childhood education but was discouraged after her early efforts were not well received. In 1930 and 1934, she completed courses in the Montessori method and became an avid advocate for it in Lithuania. Kuraitytė-Varnienė established a kindergarten and a primary school as well as courses for kindergarten teachers. She also promoted the method in the press and at various lectures and exhibits. Her work in Lithuania was interrupted by World War II. She reestablished Montessori schools in Ravensburg, Germany, and Chicago, United States.

== Biography ==
=== Early life and education ===
Kuraitytė was born in Bakaičiai near Girkalnis to a family of a petty Lithuanian noble. The family had three daughters and one son. They spent summers in Lithuania and winters in Saint Petersburg or Moscow. When Kuraitytė was four, her mother abandoned the family.

She received basic education at home and, during summers, used to teach village children to read and write. She studied at the Institute of the Princess of Oldenburg in Saint Petersburg. She graduated in 1904 and wanted to continue studying medicine, but women could study medicine only from the age of 21. Therefore, she attended the Imperial Midwifery Institute directed by Dmitry Ott.

She graduated in 1906. At the same time, her father died and Russia was still dealing with the Russian Revolution of 1905. She decided to move to Switzerland and join her sister Stasė. Both women studied pedagogy at the University of Geneva. Kuraitytė returned to Russia in 1908 where she took courses on educational games and gymnastics. In 1908–1910, she taught gymnastics at Russian gymnasiums. From 1911 to 1914, she further studied pedagogy at the Moscow City People's University. At this university, she became interested in the early childhood education. In 1912, together with others, she organized courses for playground teachers.

=== Marriage ===
Kuraitytė started dating the Lithuanian philosopher Ramūnas Bytautas but he became ill with bone tuberculosis. They traveled to Switzerland to seek treatment. Kuraitytė worked as a nurse and looked after Bytautas but he died in June 1915 in Leysin.

Kuraitytė returned to Russia and got a teaching job at a children's club organized by Stanislav Shatsky. In 1917, she moved to Voronezh where many Lithuanian students had evacuated during World War I. She worked as a governess at a Lithuanian girls' dormitory. At the same time she worked as a nurse. In a hospital, she met the painter Adomas Varnas who was recovering from a gunshot wound in his pelvis. They married in 1919 at the Church of Saint Nicholas, Vilnius, in a ceremony officiated by Juozas Tumas. The couple settled in Kaunas.

=== In interwar Lithuania ===
Kuraitytė-Varnienė first taught educational games at courses for kindergarten teachers established by Honorata Paškauskaitė-Ivanauskienė (wife of Tadas Ivanauskas). However, she quickly quit as she felt not understood and appreciated. Discouraged, she withdrew from public life.

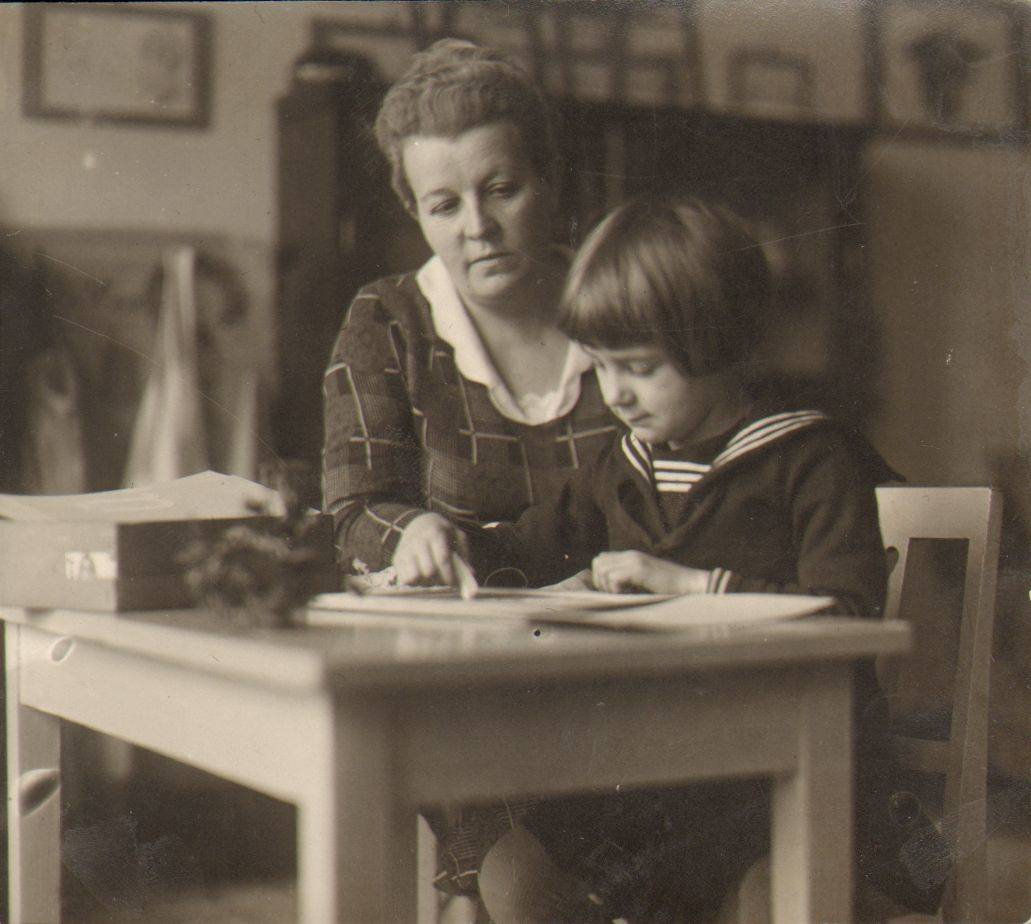
Kuraitytė-Varnienė with her young student in 1931

In 1923, while her husband worked in Czechoslovakia on printing the banknotes of the Lithuanian litas, she completed a course on the Dalcroze eurhythmics in Prague. In 1927, she started teaching at the kindergarten established for soldiers' children. Her modern teaching methods were not well received and she was forced to quit. In 1928, Kuraitytė-Varnienė opened a private kindergarten at her house in Kaunas.

In 1930, she traveled to Rome to attend half-year courses taught by Maria Montessori. She also attended similar courses in Nice in 1934 and received approval from the Association Montessori Internationale to spread Montessori ideas in Lithuania. Upon return to Lithuania, Kuraitytė-Varnienė opened a new kindergarten based on the Montessori principles which grew to include a primary school by 1936. The kindergarten was attended mainly by children of the intelligentsia as monthly costs were 40 Lithuanian litas.

She became an avid advocate of the Montessori education in Lithuania. She organized courses for kindergarten teachers and exhibits of educational materials. She published articles in various Lithuanian periodicals, including Vairas, Tautos mokykla, Židinys, Naujoji Romuva, Motina ir vaikas, as well as three brochures in 1938. In this work, she was supported by her husband Adomas Varnas and her student Domė Petrutytė. Together with Vincenta Matulaitytė-Lozoraitienė, Stasys Šalkauskis, and others, they established the Montessori Society of Lithuania in 1934. Kuraitytė-Varnienė and Varnas attended the international Montessori congress in Copenhagen in 1937. Varnas presented on children's achievements in drawing and painting when using the Montessori method.

In 1936, a new law enacted by the Lithuanian government required kindergarten teachers to have completed specialized education. This further increased competition among three main societies that operated kindergartens in Lithuania: Lietuvos vaikas (which was subsidized by the government), the Society of St. Vincent de Paul (which was supported by the Roman Catholic Church), and the Montessori Society (which received no support).

=== In Germany and the United States ===
Activities of the Montessori Society of Lithuania ceased after the Soviet occupation in 1940, but the kindergarten continued to function until 1944. At the end of World War II, Kuraitytė-Varnienė retreated from Lithuania to avoid the Soviet re-occupation. Together with Petrutytė, she opened a kindergarten and a primary school at a displaced person camp in Ravensburg, Germany.

Kuraitytė-Varnienė immigrated to the United States in 1949. Because of financial difficulties, she worked in a factory. Despite hardships, she continued her educational work – teaching at a Lithuanian school on Saturdays and lecturing to parents on the Montessori method on Sundays. Once the financial situation stabilized, together with Petrulytė, she opened her own preschool in 1955 and reestablished the Lithuanian Montessori Society in 1958. In 1966, they opened the Varnas Montessori Center in new spacious premises in Chicago that cost $70,000 (equivalent to $694,615 in 2025) to build.

Kuraitytė-Varnienė produced educational video Montessori in the Home which was shown to university professors and psychologists. Kuraitytė-Varnienė and Petrulytė were invited to deliver lectures at the DePaul University and women's monasteries. They also worked with Nancy McCormick Rambusch, founder of the American Montessori Society. Kuraitytė-Varnienė taught the Montessori method at the Alcuin Montessori School in Oak Park, Illinois.

Kuraitytė-Varnienė died on 10 October 1982 in Chicago.
