= Kamajai =

- Town
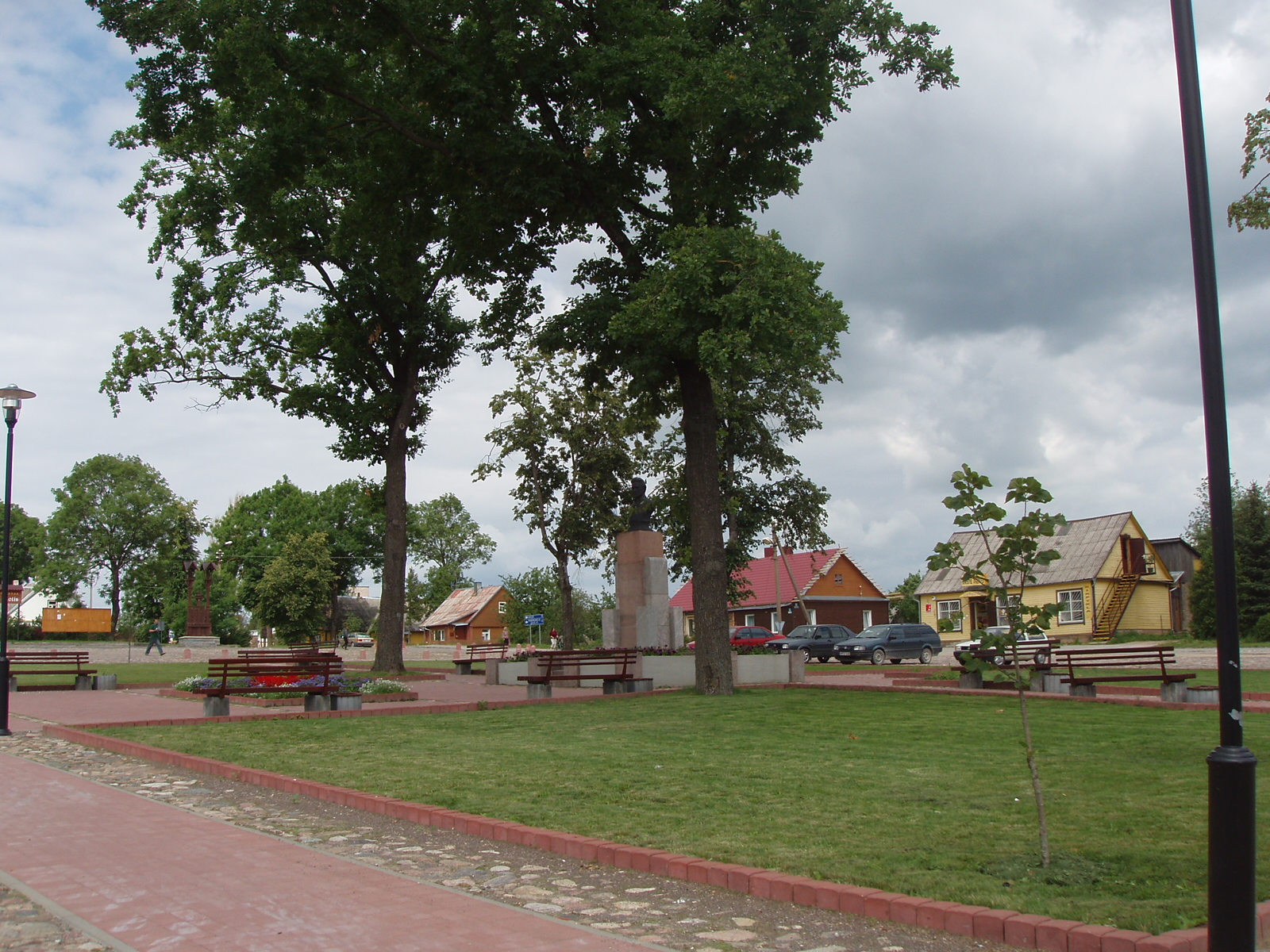
- Main town square with monument to Antanas Strazdas

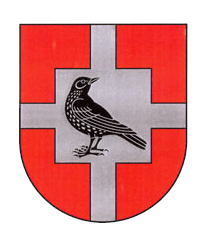
- Coat of arms

- Location of Kamajai
- Coordinates: 55°49′N 25°30′E
- Country: Lithuania
- County: Panevėžys County
- Municipality: Rokiškis district municipality
- Eldership: Kamajai eldership
- Capital of: Kamajai eldership
- First mentioned: 1541

Population (2011)
  - Total: 577
- Time zone: UTC+2 (EET)
  - Summer (DST): UTC+3 (EEST)

Kamajai is a small town in Rokiškis district municipality, Lithuania. It is situated on the banks of the Šetekšna River, some 14 km to south of Rokiškis. According to the 2011 census, it had 577 residents. The town has a small hospital, library, and hosts an annual "Kuc kuc Kamajuos" festival.

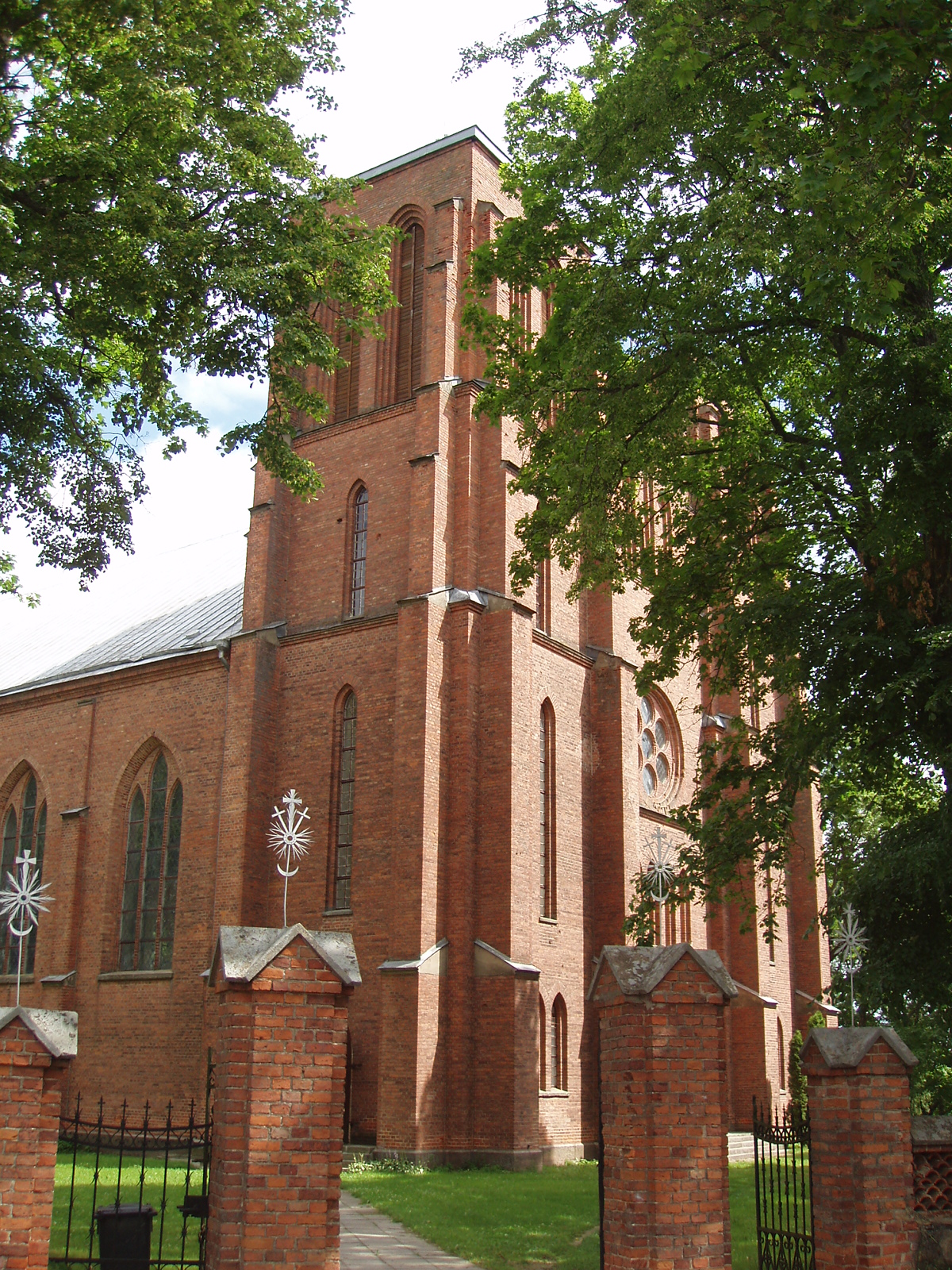
Kamajai church

== Etymology ==
The precise etymology of the town's name remains uncertain. It is hypothesised by some researchers that the area was once a lake known as Kamajys or a river called Kamaja (linguist Aleksandras Vanagas associated the town's name with the latter). However, there are no such bodies of water in the Kamajai area.

Another version of the etymology claims that the toponym comes from a surname (possibly a landowner) who migrated to the area from the town of Kamojai in present-day Belarus, near the Lithuanian border, and named the settlement in honour of his birthplace. This version is arguably more plausible, as the Kamajai Manor, which originally belonged to the Kamajevskiai family, is documented in 1541.

In other languages, the town's name is translated as: Polish: Komaje

== History ==
The Kamajai manor is known from 1541. The town slowly grew around it. The first wooden church was built in 1635, and a couple of decades later, Kamajai was referred to as a town. Around 1745, the town was reconstructed according to Classicism ideas. The town has a rectangular plan, and at the crossing of four main streets, there is the main square, which used to be known for its horse trades. The oldest part of the town, especially the street network, is protected by the government as a monument of urbanism.

In 1774, a parish school was opened. During the 1863 Uprising, the town was seized by the rebels led by Antanas Mackevičius. In 1905, during the revolution in Russia, locals, including the social democrat leader Jurgis Smolskis, created the Republic of Kamajai and resisted the tsarist authorities. The new Kamajai church, named after Saint Casimir, was built in 1903 in Gothic Revival style. It has two towers. It is said that one of the towers collapsed during World War II, and the other was severely damaged. The residents, lacking funds for reconstruction, decided to tear down the second tower. To this day, the towers are not rebuilt.

Kamajai is known as the residence of poet and priest Antanas Strazdas. He died in the town and was buried in the cemetery, but the exact location is unknown. The cemetery has a memorial cross right in the center. A monument for Strazdas was built in 1933, the 100th anniversary of his death, in the main square of the town. The school is also named after the poet.

Jewish life

Jews began to settle in Kamai in the seventeenth century. According to the all-Russian census of 1897, the population had risen to 1,105, of whom 944 were Jewish (85%). During the 1905 revolution, Jurgis Smolskis, in coordination with other communities, helped to prevent a pogrom fomented by the tsarist authorities. Between the two world wars, a Hebrew school and cultural and political associations were active in the city. About 60 Jewish families lived in the city before the start of the Second World War. With the occupation of Lithuania by the Soviet Union in 1940, non-communist Jewish cultural activities were banned for other Lithuanian citizens.

On June 26, 1941, during Operation Barbarossa, the city was occupied by the Germans. Even before the entrance of the Wehrmacht, pro-Nazi Lithuanians organized a pogrom against the Jews. After the occupation, the Jews of the city were gathered in a small neighborhood ghetto. A few weeks later, the men were deported to Rokiskis and the women and children to the Obeliai area, where they were murdered in late August 1941 along with the rest of the other Jewish citizens of the region.
