= Vilna Educational District =

Educational District in the Russian Empire

Vilna Educational District (Russian: Виленский учебный округ) was one of the educational districts of the Russian Empire that existed in 1803–1832 and 1850–1918. Its seat was Vilna (Vilnius). From 1864 to 1918, it encompassed the territory of six governorates in the Northwestern Krai.

In 1855, the district plus Mogilev and Vitebsk Governorates had 27 district schools, 178 parish schools, and 10 other schools. The emancipation reform of 1861 necessitated establishment of new schools to educate the masses of emancipated serfs and the Uprising of 1863 turned the schools into a tool for Russification policies aimed at lessening Catholic and Polish influences. The schools used the Russian language exclusively (except for religious education at primary schools which was allowed to be in the child's native language) and teachers were adherents of the Eastern Orthodox Church. Some of the Russification policies were relaxed after the Russian Revolution of 1905.

The government focused on primary education, establishing numerous new primary schools. However, despite growing demand, the number of gymnasiums (secondary schools) remained stagnant until the Revolution of 1905. In 1915, the district had 11,976 schools with 685,526 students, including 9,636 primary schools with 575,272 students.

== Territory ==
The first six educational districts, including Vilna, were established by the order of Tsar Alexander I of Russia on 24 January 1803. At the time, Vilna district was responsible for schools in eight governorates: Vilna, Vitebsk, Volhynia, Grodno, Mogilev, Minsk, Kiev, and Podolia. In 1826, Vitebsk and Mogilev Governorates were attached to the Saint Petersburg Educational District.

After the anti-Tsarit Uprising of 1831, Vilna University was closed and the educational district was liquidated. Volhynia and Podolia Governorates were transferred to the Kharkiv Educational District, while the remaining three governorates were reorganized into the Belarusian Educational District with the seat in Vitebsk. However, the seat was returned to Vilna in 1836 and the Vilna Educational District was reestablished in 1850. Its territory was reduced to four governorates: Vilna, Grodna, Minsk, and Kovno. The governor-general of Vilna became the curator of the district, but poor educational results led to reinstatement of a dedicated trustee in January 1856. In 1864, the Mogilev and Vitebsk Governorates were incorporated into the district. Thus its territory was the same as the Northwestern Krai. This territory remained the same until the district was abolished in January 1918 by the order of Anatoly Lunacharsky, People's Commissar for Education.

== Schools ==
=== Before the Uprising of 1863 ===
At the time of the formation, the district had a total of 767 students at public schools and 5,820 students at schools maintained by religious institutions. In 1804, schools were reorganized into four-class volost schools and one-class or two-class parish schools. District's trustee Adam Jerzy Czartoryski replaced Russian with Polish as the language of instruction; this policy was reversed after the Uprising of 1831.

Vilna University was the administrative center of the district. Therefore, university's rector had significant influence over the district's administration. The university was closed in 1832.

The education reform of 1828, established three main types of schools:

- One-class parish schools for children of the lower classes maintained by local clergy or nobles
- Three-class volost schools for the middle class (townspeople and merchants)
- Seven-class gymnasiums for nobles and officials – secondary schools that prepared for university

In 1855, Vilna Educational District plus Mogilev and Vitebsk Governorates had 19 five-class and 8 three-class district schools, 89 parish schools of the Ministry of National Education and 89 of the Ministry of State Property, 7 schools at the churches of confessions other than the Eastern Orthodox Church, 3 girls' schools, as well as schools of under the jurisdiction of the Holy Synod of the Russian Orthodox Church.

=== Primary schools ===
The emancipation reform of 1861 abolished serfdom in the Russian Empire which necessitated a reform to educate the masses of emancipated serfs. In January 1862, Tsar Alexander II of Russia issued an order to organize state-run primary schools. In 1864–1866, Kovno Governorate alone opened about 150 such schools. The government organized local school directorates which were governed by an appointed board – director, inspector, and one representative each from the Ministry of Internal Affairs, Ministry of State Property, and the local diocese of the Eastern Orthodox Church – which did not allow participation from the parents or the public. All children, regardless of religion, could attend schools. Russian was the language of instruction, except Catholics could be taught religion (catechism) in the native language.

Sensing rebellious moods that led to the Uprising of 1863, the governor-general of Vilna ordered to close all private schools in the Vilna Educational District in December 1862. The government attempted to gain control over primary schools, implement Russification policies, and lessen Catholic and Polish influences. The government continued centralization efforts into 1870s, bringing in primary schools affiliated with the Lutheran and Evangelical Reformed churches and Jewish schools under the district's jurisdiction. In the 1880s and 1890s, a number of primary schools maintained by the Holy Synod of the Russian Orthodox Church were opened. These schools competed with the government schools for resources. In response to such Russification efforts, Lithuanians began organizing clandestine schools which taught in the Lithuanian language.

==== Number of primary schools ====
Number of primary schools by governorate as of 1 January 1893
Type of school			Vilna	Vitebsk	Kovno	Grodno	Minsk	Mogilev	Total
Primary schools of the Ministry of Public Education	Schools		218	223	340	178	313	235	1,507
Primary schools of the Ministry of Public Education	Students	Boys	12,467	9,853	19,986	8,963	16,221	11,297	78,787
Primary schools of the Ministry of Public Education	Students	Girls	1,765	1,436	2,974	1,127	2,558	2,098	11,958
Primary schools of the Ministry of Public Education	Students	Total	14,232	11,289	22,960	10,090	18,779	13,395	90,745
Other lower properly organized educational institutions	Schools		7	11	20	9	15	13	75
Other lower properly organized educational institutions	Students	Boys	335	500	532	273	545	657	2,842
Other lower properly organized educational institutions	Students	Girls	267	125	797	201	259	272	1,921
Other lower properly organized educational institutions	Students	Total	602	625	1,329	474	804	929	4,763
Church parochial schools	Schools		50	140	62	15	174	310	751
Church parochial schools	Students	Boys	1,441	3,576	2,371	445	4,887	9,883	22,603
Church parochial schools	Students	Girls	562	486	500	262	691	1,385	3,886
Church parochial schools	Students	Total	2,003	4,062	2,871	707	5,578	11,268	26,489
Non-Orthodox confessional schools	Schools		661	204	257	302	300	193	1,917
Non-Orthodox confessional schools	Students	Boys	12,153	2,262	4,772	4,594	4,740	2,414	30,935
Non-Orthodox confessional schools	Students	Girls	1,588	298	1,036	583	570	308	4,383
Non-Orthodox confessional schools	Students	Total	13,741	2,560	5,808	5,177	5,310	2,722	35,318
Literacy schools run by Orthodox clergy	Schools		390	282	696	38	1,077	1,136	3,619
Literacy schools run by Orthodox clergy	Students	Boys	4,973	2,661	12,191	450	14,574	20,925	55,774
Literacy schools run by Orthodox clergy	Students	Girls	375	678	2,196	133	1,441	1,900	6,723
Literacy schools run by Orthodox clergy	Students	Total	5,348	3,339	14,387	583	16,015	22,825	62,497
Total	Schools		1,326	860	1,375	542	1,879	1,887	7,869
Total	Students	Boys	31,369	18,852	39,852	14,725	40,967	45,176	190,941
Total	Students	Girls	4,557	3,023	7,503	2,306	5,519	5,963	28,871
Total	Students	Total	35,926	21,875	47,355	17,031	46,486	51,139	219,812

=== Gymnasiums ===
In 1864, there were 15 gymnasiums and 3 progymnasiums in the Vilna Education District, which was more than other in other districts in Russia. The schools were located in:

- Kovno Governorate: Kovno, Kėdainiai, Panevėžys, and Šiauliai (progymnasium in Telšiai)
- Vilna Governorate: Vilna and Švenčionys (progymnasium in Vilna)
- Grodno Governorate: Grodno and Białystok (progymnasium in Svislach)
- Minsk Governorate: Minsk, Pinsk, Novogrudok, Slutsk, Mazyr
- Mogilev Governorate: Mogilev
- Vitebsk Governorate: Vitebsk and Dinaburg

In 1866, the Russian Empire had six progymnasiums and five of them were located in the Vilna Educational District. The number of progymnasiums is explained by desire for education, but lack of funding for a full gymnasium.

Since gymnasium teachers and students participated in the Uprising of 1863, Russian officials, particularly Mikhail Muravyov-Vilensky, viewed the schools as a hotbed of anti-Tsarist attitudes. This led to the reduction of the number of gymnasiums and progymnasiums and implementation of Russification policies at the remaining schools.

To strengthen Russian influence, Catholic teachers were dismissed – of the 85 Catholic teachers in secondary schools, only 20 remained by the start of the 1864/65 academic year. Polish was banned in schools, both in class and outside the class. Catholic religious classes were taught in Russian.

Due to the uprising, gymnasiums in Kėdainiai, Švenčionys, and Novogrudok and the progymnasium in Telšiai were closed. Only four gymnasiums were opened between 1866 and 1900 in Vilna, Minsk, Panevėžys, and Mogilev. While the number of gymnasiums grew in the rest of the Russian Empire, it remained stagnant in the Vilna Educational District for decades. In 1880, there were 17 secondary schools in the district that had almost double the number of students compared to 1864. This led to restrictions to who could attend these schools. In 1877, minister Ivan Delyanov issued a circular which prohibited children of lower classes (coachmen, servants, laundresses, cooks, small shopkeepers, and similar professions) to attend the gymnasiums. He also implemented a Jewish quota of 10% at the gymnasiums (Jews averaged 25% of gymnasium students in the Vilna Educational District).

Due to the Russian Revolution of 1905, a number of restrictions were lifted, including the requirement to teach religion in Russian and the prohibition of speaking Polish. The government began opening new secondary schools – ten gymnasiums were opened between 1906 and 1914.

=== Teachers' schools ===
The Uprising of 1863, prompted the Tsarist officials to develop a system for training teachers that would help implement Russification policies. Thus, the focus was political goals rather than improvement in pedagogy. Loyal teachers were seen as tools to combat the Polish nationalism and later revolutionary and socialist ideas. The system had different approaches to training primary school teachers, secondary school teachers, and private home teachers.

==== Primary school teachers ====
Mikhail Muravyov-Vilensky dismissed Catholic primary school teachers and replaced them with about 200 teachers from the interior provinces of Russia who were provided great benefits, including travel allowance and free housing. Once these benefits were revoked, many of them returned home. Molodechno Teachers' Seminary was opened in 1864 to train local teachers. It served as a model for other teachers' seminaries opened in Polotsk and Panevėžys (1872), Nesvizh (1874), and Svislach (1875). Each year, the seminaries graduated 80–120 teachers. They accepted only students of the Eastern Orthodox faith with a particular effort to recruit from the peasant class. Children of local Orthodox peasants were seen as "not corrupted" by Polish culture and best suited for the role of "Russifiers." The seminaries were not attractive to city residents because their graduates were not eligible for ranks based on the Table of Ranks. Therefore, some 90% of teachers were of peasant background and the seminaries received significant support from obshchinas (rural communities).

Two specialized teacher institutes were opened in Vilna – Jewish school in 1873 and Orthodox in 1875. They prepared teachers for urban schools or higher primary schools (intermediate between primary and secondary schools) that were organized based on the decree from 1872. However, such schools were slow to develop and the institutes graduated no more than 10–15 teachers per year.

The Russian Orthodox Church also organized schools to train primary school teachers. In 1860–1864, Muravyov-Vilensky and bishop Joseph Semashko opened five women's three-year religious schools (женские духовные училища) in Parychy, Vilna, Mogilev, Polotsk and Minsk. By the early 1880s, these schools prepared some 50–60 teachers annually who were mainly the daughters of the Orthodox clergy and peasants. In 1884, such schools were granted status of progymnasiums and allowed their graduates to obtain certificates of home teachers after passing a shortened exam.

In the mid-1880s, a new type of religious teacher school were established (церковно-учительская школа). A number of these schools were initiated and financed by the congregation. In 1902, the Diocese of Mogilev had five men's and one women's teacher schools with 505 students and the Diocese of Grodno eight schools with 485 students. Three more schools were established after 1902. In 1907, these schools graduated 450 students – roughly four times more than the government schools for primary teachers.

==== Secondary school teachers ====
In 1857, Tsarist authorities demanded that history would be taught by ethnic Russian teachers. This resulted in a teacher shortage for both for history and Russian language lessons. In 1863, gymnasium teachers were about 55% Catholic, 35% Eastern Orthodox, and 15% Lutheran.

After the Uprising of 1864, Catholic teachers were dismissed and the Institute for Nobles in Vilna which trained Polish teachers was closed. They were replaced by Russians and Baltic Germans who received 50% salary increase and travel allowances. To train new teachers, the government created 60 scholarships at various Russian universities which required the recipients to work as teachers in the Vilna Educational District for at least six years. The scholarships were limited to Eastern Orthodoxs and Baltic Germans. Such scholarship recipients were the main source of gymnasium teachers. By the early 20th century, it became apparent that the system was insufficient to meet the growing demand but the government denied efforts to open a university in the district fearing it would become a center of anti-Tsarist attitudes.

==== Private teachers ====
Private home teachers were educated at private boarding schools for women which were allowed in the Vilna Educational District in 1857–1858. Majority of owners and students of such schools were Catholic nobility and supporters of the Polish culture. Therefore, all such schools were closed in 1864 and were replaced by the Mariinsky Girls' Gymnasiums in Vilna, Grodno, Kovno, Mogilev, Minsk, and Vitebsk. These schools admitted girls of all religions and all social classes. Graduates were granted the right to work as home teachers without passing additional exams. However, obtaining a teaching certificate required a letter of trustworthiness, which were rarely issued to Catholics. By the early 1890s, the Mariinsky Gymnasiums of the district had trained approximately 2,000 home teachers, of which Catholics made up only 8–10%, Jews 20–25%, and Lutherans 3–5%, and the rest were Eastern Orthodox. The government relaxed its control over private teaching practices in 1905–1907.

== Publications ==
The district published two pedagogical periodicals. Vilna Educational District Bulletin (Циркуляр по управлению Виленским учебным округом, Tsirkulyar po Vilenskomu Uchebnomu Okrugu) was the official monthly magazine of the district published from 1862 to 1915. It mainly published official material (orders, decrees, rules, etc.) from the Ministry of Education and the trustee's office.

Public Education in the Vilna Educational District (Народное образование в Виленском учебном округе, Narodnoye Obrazovaniye v Vilenskom Uchebnom Okruge) was a supplement to the main official bulletin published from 1901 to 1915. It was first published every two months, then monthly from 1907. It published articles focused on practical advice to primary school teachers, lesson plans, news from the district, etc.

== Trustees ==
Trustees of the Vilna Educational District
Name	From	To
Adam Jerzy Czartoryski	1803	1823
Nikolay Novosiltsev	1824	1831
Ilya Bibikov (as governor-general of Vilna)	1850	1855
Yegor Wrangel	1855	1861
Alexander Shirinsky-Shikhmatov	1861	1864
Ivan Kornilov	1864	1868
Pompey Batyushkov	1868	1869
Nikolay Sergievsky	1869	1899
Vasily Popov	1899	1906
Boris von Wolf	1906	1908
Grigori Levitski	1908	1911
Alexey Ostroumov	1911	1914
Vissarion Alekseyev	1914	1915
Nikolai Chechulin	1915	1917
