= Jurgis Smolskis =

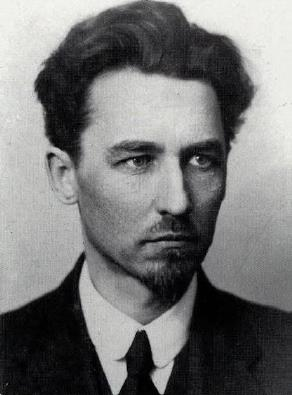
- Born: 3 May 1881; Kamajai, Kovno Governorate, Russian Empire
- Died: 6 July 1919 (aged 38); Pakriaunys, near Obeliai, Lithuania
- Education: University of St. Petersburg; New University of Brussels
- Occupations: Writer, socialist activist
- Known for: Execution by the Lithuanian Army
- Political party: Lithuanian Social Democratic Party
- Spouse: Germaine Geelens (1888–1960)
- Children: Jurgita Smolski (1920–2012)

Jurgis Smolskis (Lithuanian: Jurgis Smolskis-Smalstys, Russian: Юрий Осипович Смольский (Yuri Osipovich Smolski), French: Georges Smolski; 1881–1919) was a writer and socialist activist in the Rokiškis District, then part of the Russian Empire now Lithuania.

As a gymnasium student in Riga and a law student at the University of St. Petersburg, Smolskis joined the Lithuanian National Revival and started contributing his poetry and articles to Lithuanian periodicals, including Ūkininkas and Tėvynės sargas. He also joined an amateur theater troupe in his native Kamajai and performed in Grīva, Subate, Panevėžys, Rokiškis. Smolskis joined the Lithuanian Social Democratic Party (LSDP) and was a delegate at the Great Seimas of Vilnius. He was an active organizer of anti-Tsarist protests in the Rokiškis District during the Russian Revolution of 1905. He was arrested in Simferopol but managed to escape in summer 1907. He briefly lived in the Austrian Empire, Italy, and Switzerland before starting studies at the New University of Brussels in 1910. After graduation in late 1913, he returned to the Russian Empire and rejoined socialist activities. He was again arrested and imprisoned in May 1916 but was freed after the February Revolution. He joined the Russian Social Democratic Labour Party (Bolsheviks) and participated at the Petrograd Seimas in June 1917.

In June 1918, following the Peace of Brest-Litovsk, he returned to his homeland and was elected chairman of a local committee of Rokiškis but soon the area was taken over by the Lithuanian Soviet Socialist Republic led by Vincas Mickevičius-Kapsukas. When the Lithuanian troops of Colonel Vincas Grigaliūnas-Glovackis captured Rokiškis on 31 May 1919, Smolskis was arrested, tried by a military court, and sentenced to six years of hard labor. He was shot and killed by Petras Valasinavičius during a transfer to Obeliai allegedly because he tried to escape. His death caused a scandal in Lithuania and his widow sued in 1922. The court found Valasinavičius guilty and sentenced him to eight years of hard labor; he did not serve the full sentence as he received a presidential pardon.

== Biography ==
=== Early life ===
Smolskis was one of thirteen children and the eldest of five surviving siblings in a family of farmers in Kamajai, then part of the Russian Empire. His Lithuanian last name is Smalstys, but due to Polonization it was recorded as Smolskis in his birth records. His uncle lived in Riga and so Smolskis attended a gymnasium there. He began reading Lithuanian periodicals which were at the time banned in the Russian Empire. His parents wanted him to become a Catholic priest and when he refused, he had to earn a living as a tutor. Smolskis studied at the Faculty of Law of the University of St. Petersburg from 1900 to 1905. In 1900, he published his first poems in Ūkininkas (The Farmer) and Tėvynės sargas (The Guardian of the Homeland). He later published articles with news and events from his native Kamajai. In December 1903, he sent a letter to Jonas Basanavičius regarding the collection of examples of Lithuanian folklore. Smolskis was also active in the amateur Lithuanian theater. He organized several illegal theater performances accompanied by lectures and poetry readings in villages near Kamajai. Since government permits were easier to obtain in the Courland Governorate, Smolskis organized a legal performance of comedies Amerika pirtyje (America in the Bathhouse) by Keturakis and Neatmezgamas mazgas (The Impossible Knot) by Petras Pundzevičius-Petliukas in Grīva in December 1904. In 1905, the troupe performed legally in Subate, Panevėžys (twice), Rokiškis, and Kamajai. In July 1905, Smolskis refused entry to a performance to a uryadnik (police officer) who did not purchase a ticket and chased him away with a group of men. Smolskis was sentenced to six weeks in prison in Zarasai.

=== Revolution of 1905 and exile ===
As a student, Smolskis became a supporter of social democracy. In summer 1904, he organized the congress of the youth organization of the Lithuanian Social Democratic Party (LSDP) at the manor of Vladas Sirutavičius in Kairiškiai. Smolskis supported the Russian Revolution of 1905 and organized the Republic of Kamajai in summer 1905. The republic removed Russian officials and organized its own library, hectograph, armed guard, and court. It had two flags, one red with the slogan Long live socialism and another black with the slogan Death to tyrants. Smolskis organized various public protests and delivered anti-government speeches in Jūžintai, Obeliai, Dusetos, Zarasai, Užpaliai. His activities reached as far as Utena and Alanta. He was arrested during a speech in Rokiškis. During a protest on 30 October [O.S. 17 October] 1905 in Kamajai, Smolskis detained a pristav (police officer), confiscated his weapons, and forced him to walk around with a black flag which had an anti-Tsarist slogan. Smolskis also agitated Kamajai residents against anti-Jewish pogroms. Smoskis participated in the Great Seimas of Vilnius which adopted a resolution demanding a wide political autonomy within the Russian Empire and urged people to engage in nonviolent resistance to achieve this goal. However, Russian authorities started to crack down on the revolutionaries. Russian policemen accompanied by about 100 Cossacks searched the home of Smolskis' parents on 26 December [O.S. 13 December] 1905. The house was looted (the damage was appraised at 25 Russian rubles) and Smolskis' brother Balys was beaten with a nagaika and arrested. On 3 February [O.S. 21 January] 1906, about 300 dragoons and infantrymen with four cannons arrived to Kamajai for a punitive action. The soldiers surrounded and robbed Smolskis' home before firing four cannonballs into its walls.

As it was unsafe in Lithuania, Smolskis escaped to East Prussia around February 1906. He traveled to Switzerland, but soon returned to Lithuania and joined the central committee of the LSDP in Vilnius. He instigated farmer strikes in Suvalkija and organized textile workers in Białystok. Searched by police, Smolskis decided to travel to Crimea where he was caught and imprisoned in Simferopol. He befriended a peasant who agreed to take Smolskis' place allowing him to escape during prisoner transfer in July 1907. He briefly stayed in Kraków and Zakopane (then part of the Austrian Empire), Capri (Italy), Davos and Arosa (Switzerland), before moving to Brussels to study sociology under professor Guillaume De Greef at the New University of Brussels in 1910. There he met his future wife Germaine "Maine" Geelens, a teacher following new pedagogical methods of Ovide Decroly.

=== Return to Russia ===
After graduation from the university in late 1913, Smolskis returned to Russia with fake papers and obtained a bookkeeping job in a mine in the Ural. In June 1914, Smolskis and Geelens reunited in Bazilionai near Šiauliai. The couple did not feel safe in Lithuania and traveled to Saint Petersburg where Smolskis joined socialist activities. When, due to World War I, police archives from Vilnius were moved to Saint Petersburg, the couple decided to move to Siberia in May 1916 but Smolskis was arrested at the train station in Irkutsk and imprisoned in Kostroma. Due to poor health (neurasthenia and severe anemia), he was transferred to a prison in Zamoskvorechye District, Moscow, where he married Geelens in a ceremony officiated by Juozas Tumas-Vaižgantas. He was freed from prison after the February Revolution.

After a brief rest in the Caucasus, Smolskis returned to Moscow and joined revolutionary activities of the legalized LSDP and collaborated with Stasys Matulaitis on publishing Socialdemokratas (Social Democrat). He also joined the Russian Social Democratic Labour Party (Bolsheviks) and edited the communist newspaper Tiesa (The Truth). However, he supported social democrats and cooperation with other parties and thus soon withdrew from the Bolsheviks. Smolskis was an active participant in the Petrograd Seimas in June 1917. The Seimas discussed Lithuania's political future after the war. The socialists, including Smolskis, advocated for autonomy within Russia and withdrew from the proceedings when a resolution calling for full independence won by a narrow margin. After the October Revolution, Smolskis worked at the Lithuanian section of the People's Commissariat for Nationalities on cataloging valuables (equipment, archives, art) evacuated from Lithuania during the war.

=== Execution by the Lithuanian Army ===
In June 1918, following the Peace of Brest-Litovsk, he returned to his formally independent homeland and was elected chairman of the local committee of Rokiškis which attempted to establish local Lithuanian administration. After the outbreak of the Lithuanian–Soviet War, Rokiškis was occupied in 1919 by the Soviet Red Army and taken over by the Communists, who had proclaimed the Soviet Russian puppet state of the Lithuanian Soviet Socialist Republic led by Vincas Mickevičius-Kapsukas. The local committee was replaced by a revolutionary committee (revkom) and Smolskis became a deputy of his friend Antanas Purėnas who was in charge of schools in the district.

On 31 May 1919, Rokiškis was liberated during the Kupiškis–Utena offensive by Lithuanian soldiers under Colonel Vincas Grigaliūnas-Glovackis who was known for executing Communist sympathizers. Smolskis was arrested on 26 June and tried by a military court. He was suspected of being responsible for the execution of a Catholic priest in Ilūkste but was cleared of that charge and avoided a death penalty. The court still sentenced him to three years of hard labor, but Grigaliūnas-Glovackis refused to confirm the sentence and convened the second court. This time he was sentenced to six years of hard labor. In the morning of 6 July 1919, Smolskis was escorted from Pakriaunys to Obeliai by soldiers Petras Valasinavičius and Juozas Pėža. Just outside the village, Valasinavičius killed Smolskis with a single shot to the head. Grigaliūnas-Glovackis, treating Smolskis as a traitor and an atheist, forbade the funeral procession to Rokiškis or a cross on his grave. Smolskis was buried where he was shot; his remains were exhumed and transferred to Obeliai in 1947.

Returning to her parents in Verviers, his widow Geelens gave birth in February 1920 to a posthumous girl, named Jurgita (Georgette) after her father. Back to Lithuania, she sued for justice in a Kaunas court in 1922. Valasinavičius claimed that Smolskis tried to escape, but the court found him guilty and sentenced him to eight years of hard labor. After a couple of years, Valasinavičius received a presidential pardon and emigrated abroad. The executions of Smolskis and of Feliksas Valiukas and his wife became the two most prominent examples of executions under Grigaliūnas-Glovackis.

== Works and legacy ==
Smolskis wrote poetry and short stories, but his most popular literary work is the one-act comedy Nutrūko ([It] Broke) published in 1906. It was performed at least 51 time by various amateur troupes in 1906–1910. In 1906, he also published two short stories, his own Vasaros rytas (Summer Morning) and translated Kalinių badavimas (Hunger of Prisoners). His short stories were published in Audroms siaučiant (When the Storms Raged), an anthology of revolutionary writers published in Vilnius in 1955. Many of his works were destroyed during his arrests and the wars.

His daughter Georgette Smolski (Lithuanian: Jurgita Smolskytė) published her father's biography in Lithuanian and French. In 1996, she founded the Smolski–Geelens Foundation to support graduate students in history at Vilnius University and the Free University of Brussels. In 2009, a memorial to Jurgis Smalstys-Smolskis is inaugurated in Pakriaunys at the execution site. On the occasion of the centenary of his death, a stele with a portrait of the couple was erected in the name of the descendants from Belgium.
