= Adomas Varnas =

Lithuanian painter

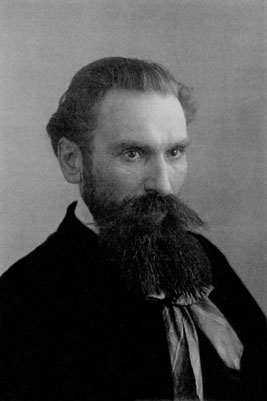
Adomas Varnas

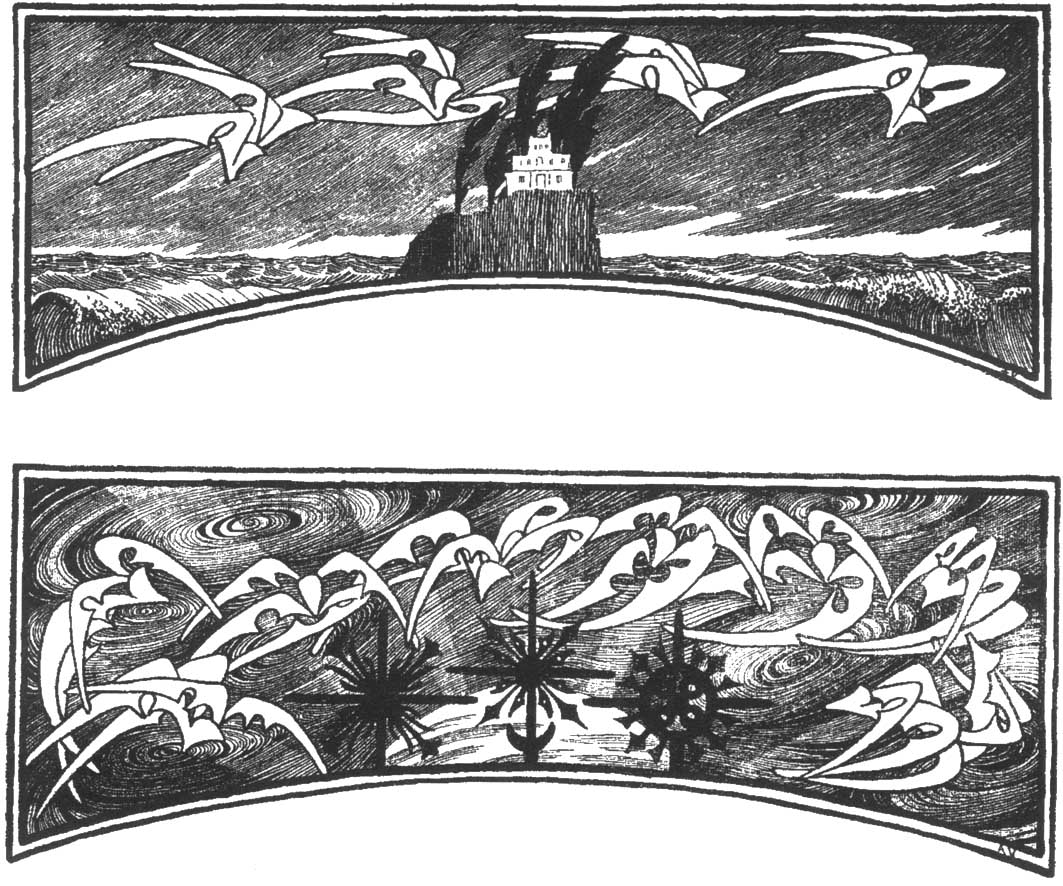
Adomas Varnas. “Headpieces of the almanac Pirmasis baras.” 1914

Adomas Varnas (January 1, 1879, in Joniškis, Lithuania – July 19, 1979, in Chicago, United States) was a prominent Lithuanian painter, photographer, collector, philanthropist, and educator.

Author of the world first album of ethnographical photography Lithuanian Crosses (Lietuvos kryžiai, 2 volumes, 1926, Kaunas) about the Lithuanian cross crafting.

He was husband of the educator Marija Kuraitytė-Varnienė and helped her promote the Montessori education in Lithuania.

== Biography ==
Varnas was born in Joniškis, Lithuania. He studied art at St. Petersburg, Russia, and Kracow, Poland, where he was mostly impressed by the landscape artist Professor Stanislavski. He was in exile in Germany in 1902. In 1905 he went to study art at Geneva's Ecole des Beaux-Arts. At the same time, Varnas took two different art classes: portrait painting and decorative art. In 1908, after graduating from the academy of art, with highest degrees, he left for Sicily. The artist immersed himself into the Sicilian mountainous landscape with its scenic seashores and its fishermen, producing many landscape artworks.

In 1913 Varnas returned to his native Lithuania, making his home in its capital Vilnius, where he worked not only as an artist but also as a civic and cultural leader. With the advancing of the war, in 1915 he went to Odessa, Russia. Charged with nationalist activities, he was arrested in 1917 and spent nearly a year in prison. After the war returned to Kaunas, where he opened his own studio.

After Lithuania won its independence in 1918, the artist Varnas worked in theatre and opera, making his contribution by painting the sceneries. He won many prizes by designing playing cards and postage stamps, and he went to Prague to supervise the first printing of Lithuanian money. As a teacher, he taught art at Lithuanian schools in Voronezh, and in Vilnius Vytautas the Great Gymnasium, Kaunas Art School, and State Art Institute. He spent five years collecting objects of Lithuanian folklore and making photographs of wooden crosses which were found alongside the roads.

During World War II, the artist Varnas fled Lithuania to Dresden, Germany. After spending time in a displaced persons camp, in 1949 he came to Chicago, where he lived until his death.

== Works ==
Varnas' artworks can be divided into four periods. The first period (1908–1913) includes his postgraduate study works of portraits and landscapes. The second period (1914–1918) includes portraits and political caricatures. The post-war period was not very rich in numbers, but much richer in quality. Now the artist frees himself from romantic inclinations, concentrating more on the development of color problems. The third period (1918–1940), which coincides with independent Lithuania, shows the artist's intensified colorific aspirations in his portraits and his favorite subject: the landscape. To this period also belongs his graphic works, postage stamps, money projects, political caricatures, theatrical sceneries. In the fourth period, from 1944 until his death, the artist continued to paint mostly portraits and landscape. In this period, he painted the monumental historical composition The Coronation of King Mindaugas, in which the artist demonstrated a four-year painstaking work of art. The artist's portraits represent the human face with all its simplicity, weaknesses and greatness. He tends to include a symbolic background in order to represent a person's social position in life. He not only paints outward facial features, but he also reveals the personality of the sitter. In his oil paintings, he represents realistic objects with a somewhat slight touch of impressionism. His most characteristic elements are simplicity and sincerity. It is amazing, that during Varnas' long artistic life, spanning over 60 years, he never was influenced by developing new trends in art, such as expressionism, surrealism, or even abstract. The artist's objects never lost its true realistic form, he always remained faithful to nature. In his open-air outdoor landscape scene paintings, we see a patient detailed study of nature as seen only through the artist's eyes. Therefore, besides historical and portrait paintings, Varnas is probably best known as a truly exclusive landscape artist.
