= Barn theatres in Lithuania =

Theatre tradition in Lithuania

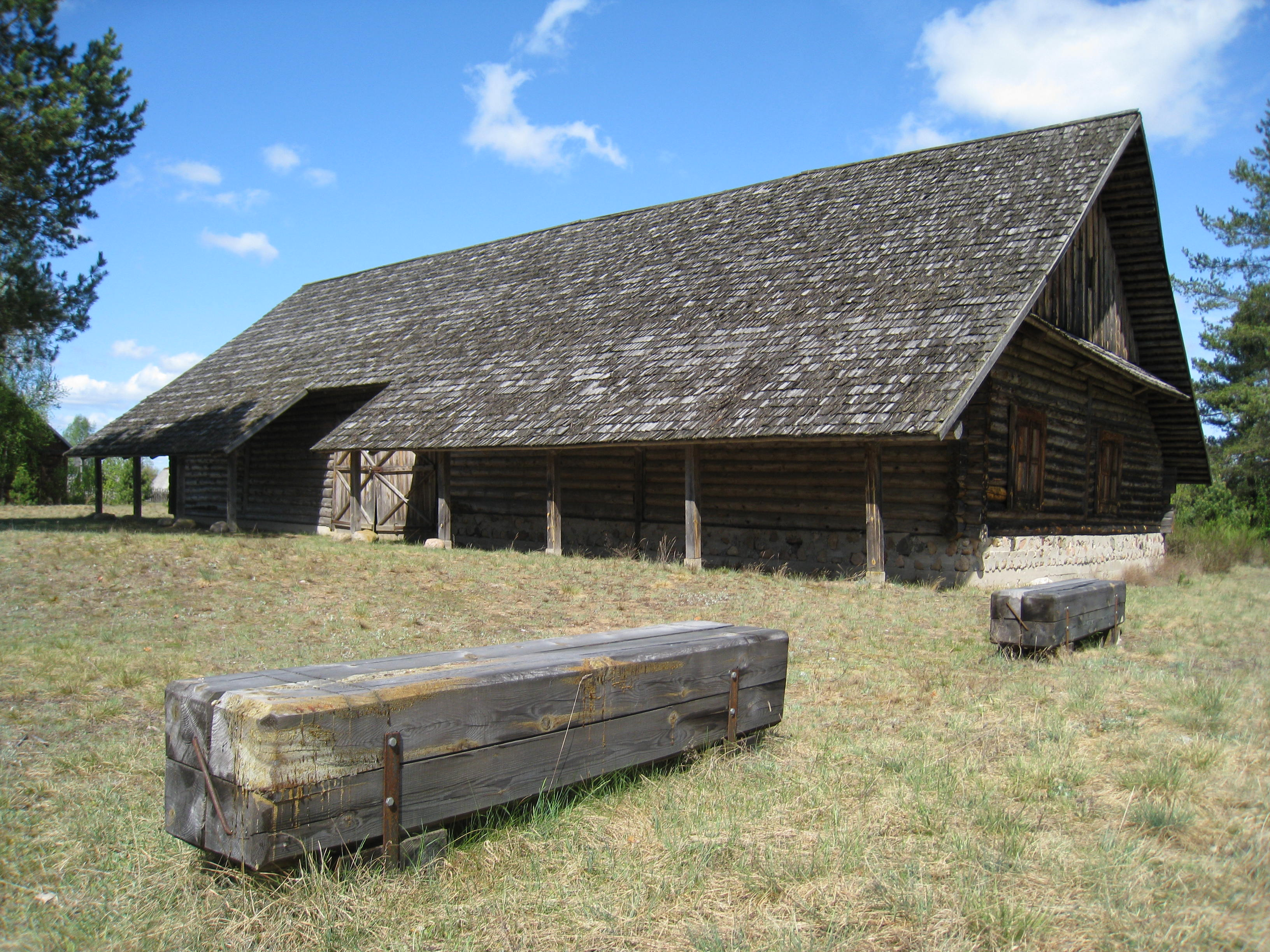
A barn in Margionys which houses a barn theatre

Barn theatre (Lithuanian: klojimo teatras) is a tradition in Lithuania to stage amateur theatre performances and music concerts in barns.

The practice originated during the Lithuanian National Revival (late 19th century – World War I) when Lithuania was part of the Russian Empire and the Lithuanian language and culture were suppressed. After 1918, when Lithuania became independent, the tradition was discontinued, with the exception of the Vilnius Region, which was incorporated into the Second Polish Republic.

The tradition was revived in the interwar Lithuania. A barn theatre in the village of Margionys was established in 1929. The tradition of setting performances there was reestablished in 1970s–1980s and continues into the 21st century. Barn theatre festivals are being held in various places, including Kurtuvėnai Regional Park, and Jurbarkas. In 1983, the Agluonėnai Barn Theatre was established by the initiative of the chairman of a local collective farm and the students of folk theatre directors' faculty in Klaipėda department of the Lithuanian State Conservatory (under professor Petras Bielskis).

The barn theatre tradition is also kept by the Lithuanian Cultural House in Puńsk and in Sejny, Poland.

The Lithuanian Barn Theatre Society (Lithuanian: Lietuvos klojimo teatro draugija) was officially registered in 1991.
