= Antanas Strazdas =

Lithuanian priest and poet

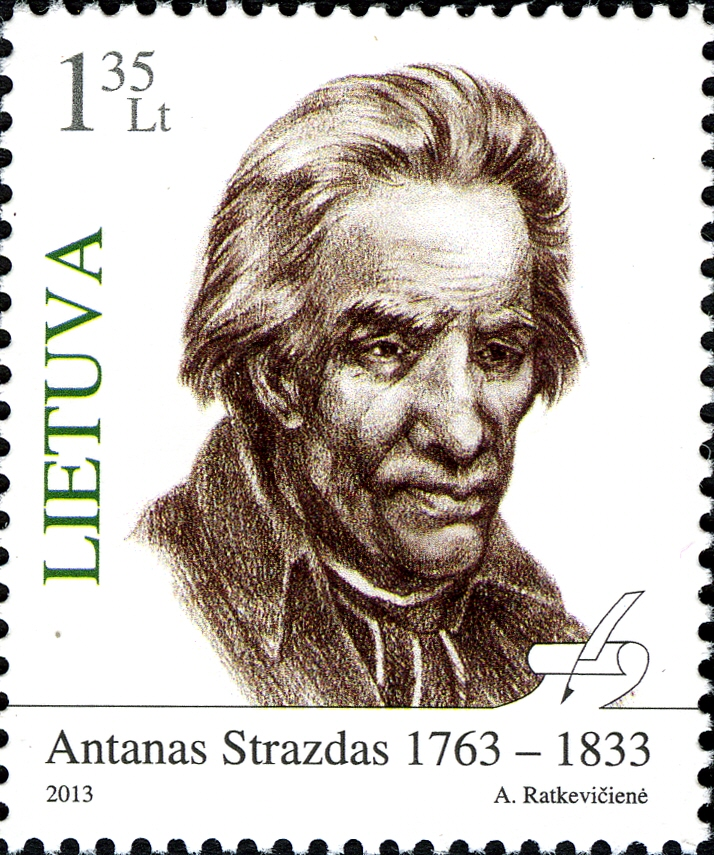
Stamps of Lithuania, 2013

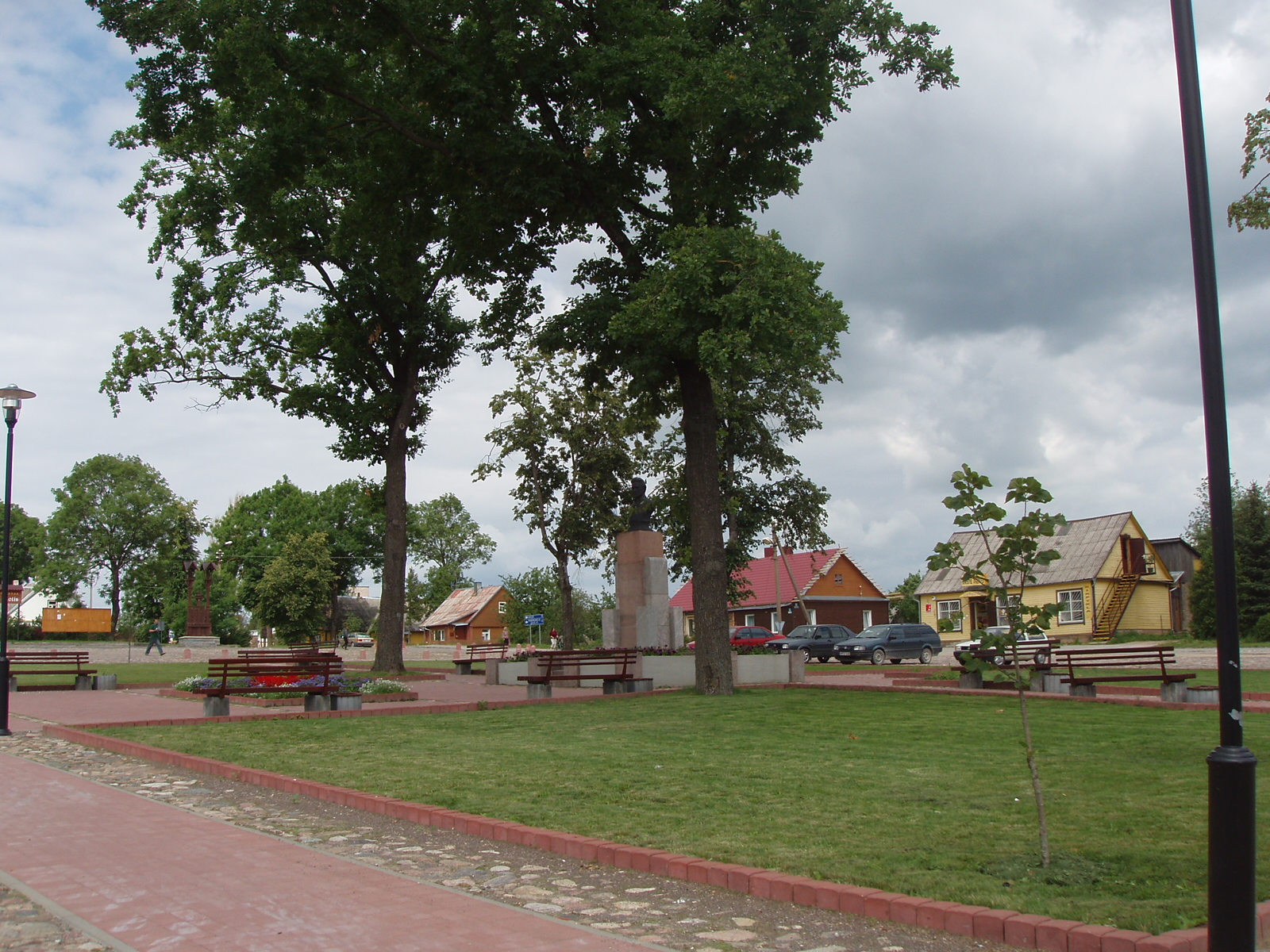
Main town square in Kamajai with monument to Strazdas

Antanas Strazdas (9 March 1760 in Margėnai, Rokiškis district – 23 April 1833 in Kamajai; signed in Polish as Antoni Drozdowski, often called Strazdelis by the locals) was a Lithuanian priest and poet. Because of his humble origins and lifestyle, he became somewhat of a folklore hero.

Born to a poor serf family, he attended many schools established by monasteries, including ones in Polatsk and Daugavpils. In 1789 he finally graduated from Varniai theological seminary. Due to his restless nature, he traveled from one parish to another, often living on his own as a farmer. In 1820 he settled more permanently in Kamajai, where he bought land and kept up a farm, only sometimes performing his duties as a priest. In 1828 he was accused of improper behavior for a priest and confined in the Pažaislis Monastery. Next year he left the monastery and returned to Kamajai, where he died just four years later.

During his lifetime only two thin poetry books were published. One of them, Secular and Holy Songs (Lithuanian: Giesmės svietiškos ir šventos) published in 1814, contains nine secular verses and two hymns written in the Lithuanian language. The second, Ode to Riga, was published in the Polish language in 1824. The third collection of Lithuanian poems was destroyed by the censors. As many as 50 songs are attributed to Strazdas and passed by word of mouth to this day. However, the authorship is hard to establish because of lack of written proof and because of the tendency of Strazdas' songs to become part of folklore.

His best known work, the hymn Pulkim ant kelių (Let us Fall on Our Knees) is still sung to this day in churches. His most famous poems include Strazdas (The Thrush), where the poet, personified by the bird, sings about peasant's joys and worries; Aušra (The Dawn) tells about the joy a dawn brings and that breaks a lot of rules on rhythm and rhyme; Barnis (The Quarrel) is the only poem about Strazdas himself.

Strazdas avoided the nobles and remained closely connected to the ordinary people. Strazdas borrowed melody, tone, and style from the folk songs, writing his poetry for the common peasants. His songs are simple and the content is usually dealing with a peasant's life and labor. His works were also affected by Polish poems, especially the sentimental poetry. However, his Ode to Riga, written for the anniversary of founding of Riga, proved that he was able to handle more complicated and sophisticated poetic forms.
