= Obeliai =

- City
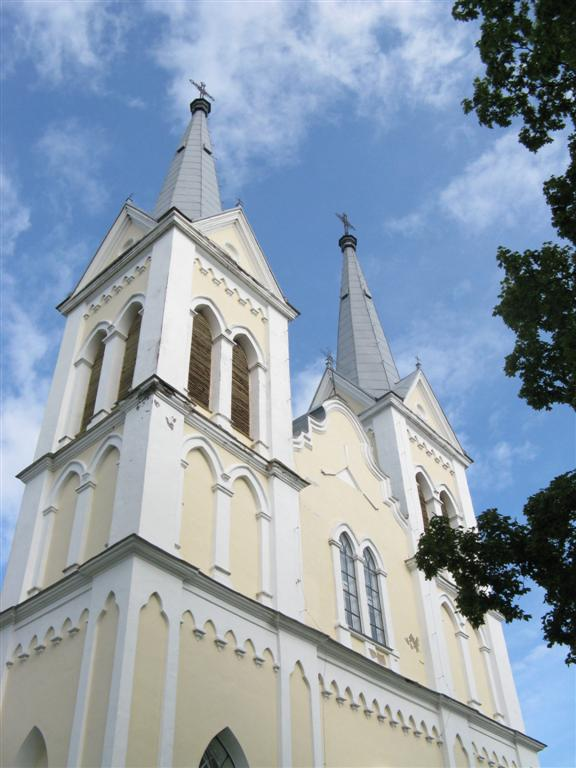
- St. Anne's Church

- Coat of arms

- Location of Obeliai
- Coordinates: 55°56′0″N 25°48′0″E
- Country: Lithuania
- Ethnographic region: Aukštaitija
- County: Panevėžys County
- Municipality: Rokiškis district municipality
- Eldership: Obeliai eldership
- Capital of: Obeliai eldership
- First mentioned: 1519
- Granted city rights: 1956

Population (2022)
  - Total: 842
- Time zone: UTC+2 (EET)
  - Summer (DST): UTC+3 (EEST)

Obeliai is a small city in the Rokiškis district municipality of Panevėžys County, Lithuania. At the foot of the town is one of the area's many lakes.

The town of Obeliai is small due in no small part to the diversion of the railway; the station remains but is no longer in use.

== Etymology ==
The name of the town probably comes from the common Lithuanian word obelis, meaning apple tree – this could have been the name given to a place where many apple trees grew. In everyday speech, the name was previously known as Obelius. The town's name in other languages translates as: Polish: Abele, Yiddish: אבעל Abel.

== History ==
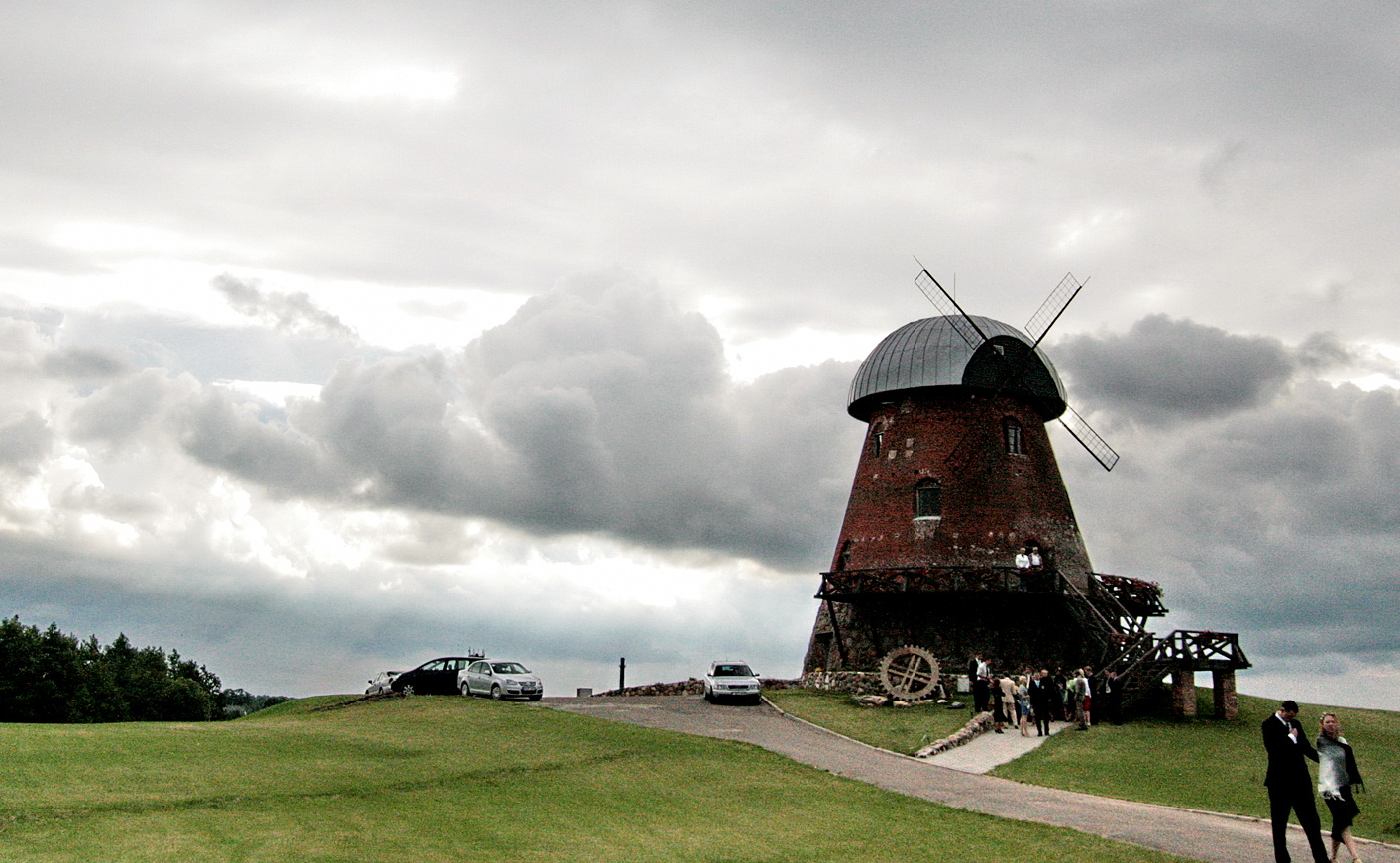
A windmill in Obeliai

The arms of the town were granted on August 8, 1993. Obeliai was first mentioned in the 16th century and received city rights in 1957. The town did not use any arms until the above arms were designed in 1993. The blue bend symbolises the Kriauna River, the silver field, the Lake Obeliai. The three apple blossoms on the bend are canting (sloping), "obelis" meaning apple tree. Apples used to be a major export of Obeliai, with many orchards surrounding the town. This industry is all but gone now.

In August 1941, all the Jewish residents of Obeliai and the surrounding villages were taken into the Antanašė Forest by the Nazis, made to dig a long trench and then shot and buried. The Jäger Report stated that on August 25, 1941, a total of 1,160 Jews, consisting of 112 men, 627 women, and 421 children were killed.

== Famous residents ==
- Joe Slovo – South African anti-apartheid activist
- Rabbi Chaim Shohet was the av beit din, or head of the Jewish court in Obeliai before immigrating to the United States and becoming rabbi at Shaarey Tphiloh and then the Etz Chaim Synagogue in Portland, Maine.
