= Mikhail Muravyov-Vilensky =

Russian noble and Imperial official (1796–1866)

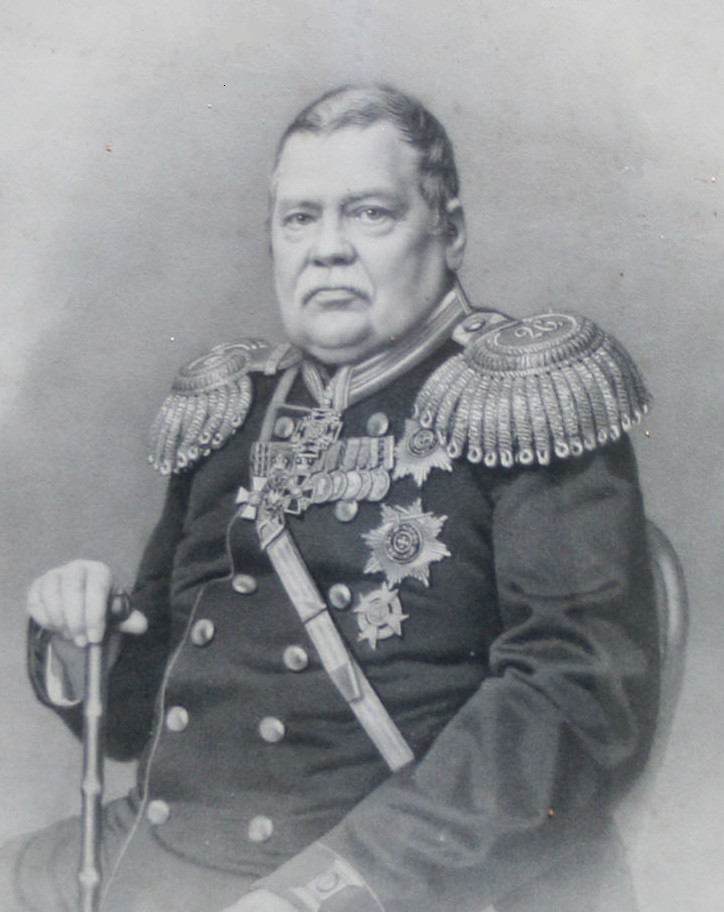
Mikhail Nikolayevich Muravyov

Count Mikhail Nikolayevich Muravyov (Russian: Граф Михаи́л Никола́евич Муравьёв; 12 October 1796 in Moscow – 12 September 1866 in Saint Petersburg) was a Russian imperial statesman of the 19th century, most known for brutally putting down of Polish and Lithuanian uprisings and leading subsequent cultural and social depolonization of Northwestern Krai (today's Belarus and Lithuania). He should not be confused with his grandson, Mikhail Nikolayevich Muravyov, who served as Russian Foreign Minister between 1897 and 1900.

== Early years ==
During his years at the University of Moscow, Muravyov set up the Mathematical Society, of which he would later become president. He volunteered during the Patriotic War of 1812 and was wounded at Borodino. In 1816 he became a co-founder of the first Decembrist societies, and, although he didn't actively participate in the movement after 1820, he was briefly apprehended by the police after their failed uprising in December 1825. By some sources he was cooperating with the investigation buying out his freedom this way.

Upon the intercession of his high-placed relatives, Muravyov was appointed Vice-Governor of Vitebsk in 1826, and appointed Governor of Mogilyov in 1828. At these posts, he became known for his harsh policy of Russification. Muravyov's experiences during the November Uprising of 1830 persuaded him that two principal agents responsible for the spread of the Polish nationalism were the Roman Catholic priests and Polish students. As a consequence, he made it his priority to close Vilnius University and to expel Catholic priests from other educational facilities. He was reported as saying that, "What Russian rifle did not succeed in doing, will be finished off by Russian schools."

In 1831 Muravyov governed Grodno, only to be moved to Minsk the following year. In 1850, he was made a member of the State Council of the Russian Empire. In the 1850s he served as Vice-President of the Russian Geographical Society. Alexander II appointed him Minister of State Properties, a position which Muravyov used to lead the reactionary party opposed to the emancipation of the serfs. His administration of state-owned peasant households proved catastrophic and effectively reduced many of them to bankruptcy.

== Governor General ==
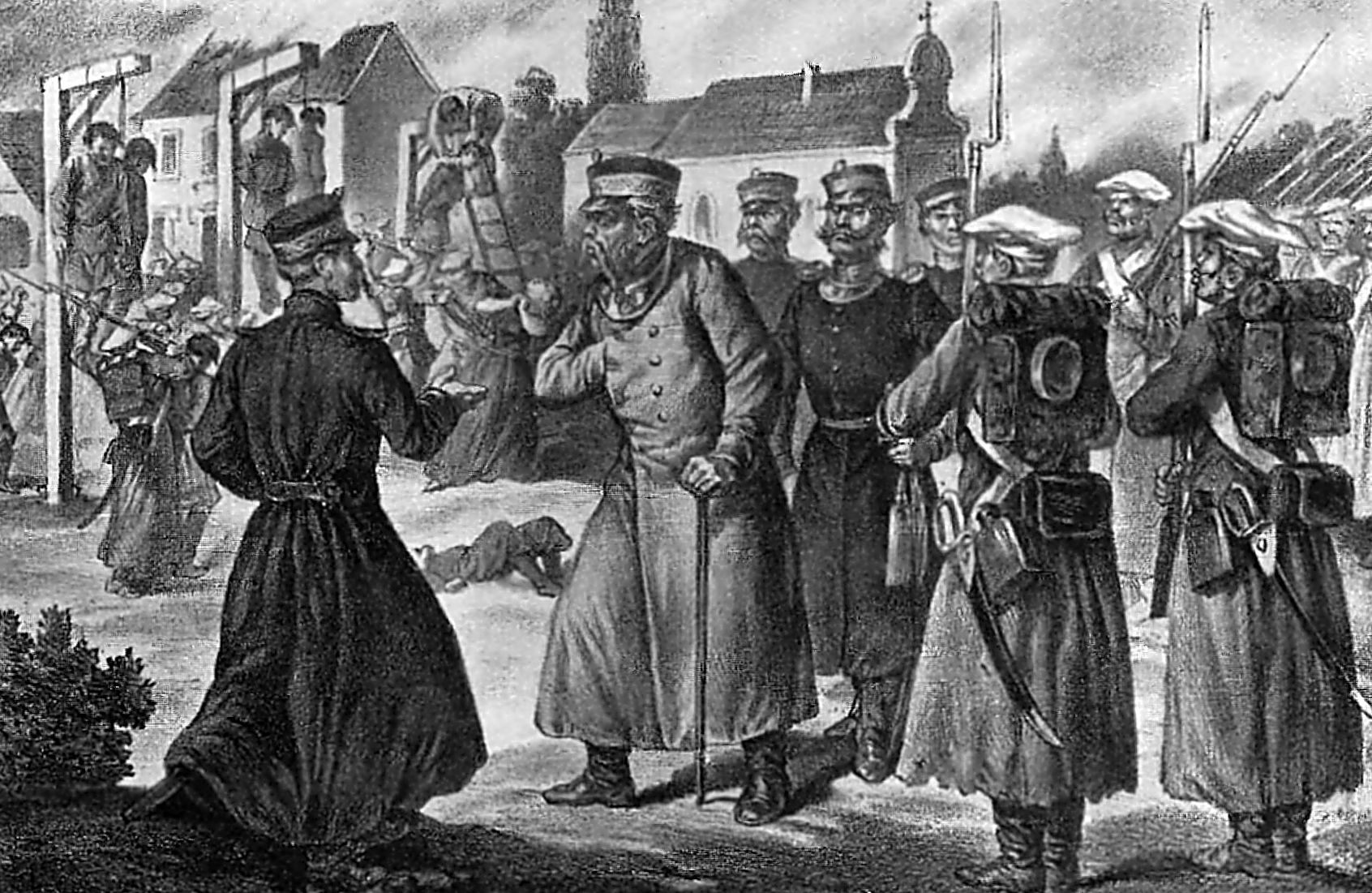
Polish drawing of Mikhail Muravyov-Vilensky during January Uprising

During the January Uprising of 1863, Muravyov was appointed Governor General of Vilna (former Grand Duchy of Lithuania, now Lithuania and part of Belarus). He instituted a complete ban on the Latin alphabet and the Lithuanian language in printed content. The ban was lifted in 1904. He managed to promptly subdue the rebellion. About 9000 insurgents were resettled to Siberia, 127 were demonstratively hanged. Konstanty Kalinowski, Zygmunt Sierakowski and Antanas Mackevičius were among the rebel leaders executed on his orders. Those settlements where the rebels were reported had to pay enormous contributions. As a consequence, for Poles and liberal Russian circles Muravyov became known as the "hangman of Vilnius" even in modern Polish historiography he is sometimes referred to by his contemporary nickname, 'Wieszatiel' ('hangman'). To many nationally minded Russians, Muravyov was a hero and the de facto head of the "Russian Party". They flooded Muravyov with congratulatory telegrams on his nameday, November 8, 1863, a form of public expression previously unknown in Russia.

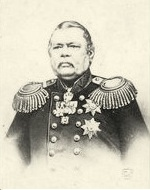
Mikhail Muravyov-Vilensky

After defeating the rebels militarily, Muravyov began a series of deep reforms which aimed at the liquidation of the breeding grounds for future uprisings. He strengthened the economic, educational and social positions of Orthodox Belarusian peasants who made up the majority of the Krai's population at these times. He paid much attention to the restoration of the Orthodox character of Belarus since he regarded this as the best means against potential disloyalty and because he was convinced that he was liberating ancient Russian (Rus') lands from Polish subjugation.

On May 1, 1865, Muravyov was relieved from his duties. For his vital services to the Empire, he received a comital title and spent late 1865 and early 1866 writing his memoirs. At the time of his death, Muravyov was investigating Dmitry Karakozov's attempt to assassinate the tsar.

== Contemporary reactions ==
In the long term, Muravyov's policy proved mixed. In 1905 Polish rebellion once again took place against the Russian Empire. He was however instrumental in rooting out Roman Catholicism in Belarus, prohibiting construction of new churches and converting the existing ones to Eastern Orthodox chapels. Muravyov justified his Russification policies by claiming that Polish and Lithuanian administration undertook Polonization measures.

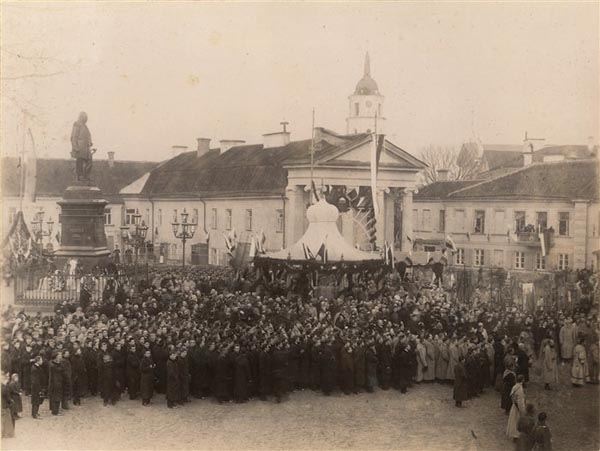
Opening ceremony of a Muravyov memorial in Vilnius, 1898

Assessment of Muravyov's activity by the educated strata of the Russian society varied from enraptured odes by Fyodor Tyutchev to caustic satires by Nikolai Nekrasov. After the suppression of the 1863 uprising, the celebrated emigre writer Alexander Herzen, bitterly joked that Muravyov should replace Alexander II on the throne as a more consistent and forceful nationalist. In Poland and Lithuania he has been viewed as a personification of tsarist repression and Russification.

== Notes ==
- See A.N. Mosolov, "Vilenskie ocherki", in Russkaia starina no. 11, 1883, p. 405. quoted in Mikhail Dolbilov, "We are at one with our tsar who serves the Fatherland as we do: The Civic Identity of Russifying Officials in the Empire's Northwestern Region after 1863"
