= Panemunėlis =

- Town
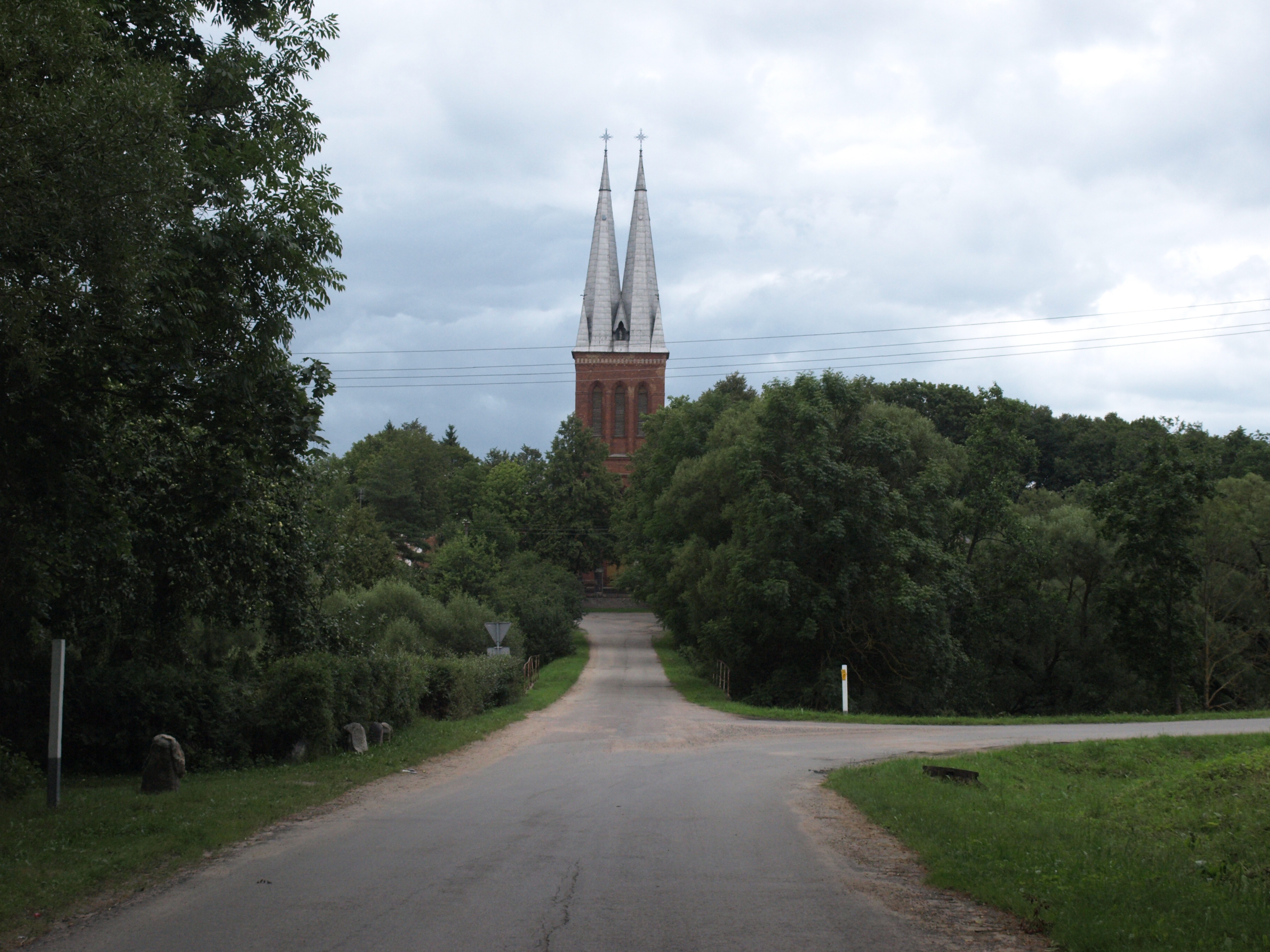

- Location within Lithuania
- Coordinates: 55°54′50″N 25°27′0″E
- Country: Lithuania
- County: Panevėžys County

Population (2021)
  - Total: 183
- Time zone: UTC+2 (EET)
  - Summer (DST): UTC+3 (EEST)

Panemunėlis (Polish: Poniemunek) is a small town (miestelis) in Panevėžys County, Rokiškis District, northeastern Lithuania. According to the 2011 census, the town has a population of 192 people. It straddles the Nemunėlis river.

There is the Gireišiai point of the Struve Geodetic Arc southwards by Panemunėlis.
