= Kipras Bielinis =

Lithuanian politician

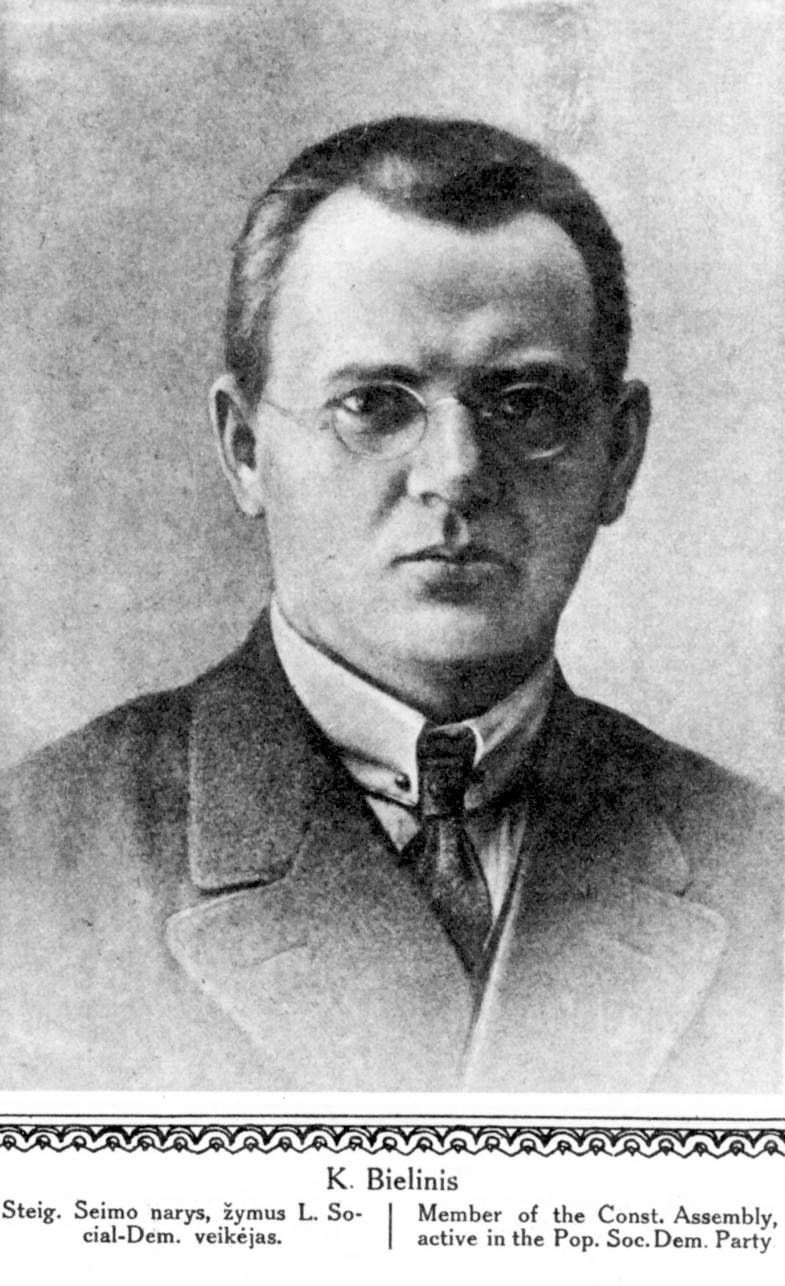
- Bielinis in Lithuania Album (1921)
- Born: 26 September 1883; Purviškiai I, Kovno Governorate, Russian Empire
- Died: 7 December 1965 (aged 82); New York, United States
- Resting place: Lithuanian National Cemetery; Petrašiūnai Cemetery (reburied)
- Occupation: Politician
- Political party: Social Democratic Party of Lithuania
- Board member of: Supreme Committee for the Liberation of Lithuania (VLIK); Lithuanian National Foundation
- Parent: Jurgis Bielinis

Kipras Bielinis (26 September 1883 – 7 December 1965) was a Lithuanian politician, one of the leaders of the Social Democratic Party in interwar Lithuania.

Bielinis was a son of Jurgis Bielinis, one of the best known Lithuanian book smugglers. Bielinis attended a gymnasium in Riga, but was expelled for his social-democratic activities. He joined the Social Democratic Party of Lithuania and along with Steponas Kairys was one of its leaders until his death. Bielinis was an active participant in the Russian Revolution of 1905 delivering some 30 public anti-Tsarist speeches across Lithuania. He was arrested by the police together with other members of the Latvian Social Democratic Workers' Party in November 1907 and was sentenced to four years of hard labor and then exile to the Irkutsk Oblast. After the February Revolution, he moved to Petrograd and returned to Lithuania in summer 1918. Bielinis was elected to the Constituent Assembly of Lithuania in April 1920, Second Seimas in May 1923, and the Third Seimas in May 1926. A member of the opposition to the Lithuanian Christian Democratic Party, he was one of the most active speakers during the parliamentary sessions. After the coup d'état of December 1926, Bielinis withdrew from more active political life working as a finance director at the Lithuanian Chamber of Agriculture and board member of several cooperatives. During the German occupation of Lithuania, Bielinis was a member of the resistance and organized the Supreme Committee for the Liberation of Lithuania (VLIK). In 1944, as many other Lithuanian intellectuals, he retreated west ahead of the advancing Red Army and moved to the United States in 1949. He was an active member of various anti-Soviet Lithuanian organizations. Four volumes of his memoirs were published in 1958–2012.

== Biography ==
=== Russian Empire ===
Bielinis was born in Purviškiai I in Biržai District, then part of the Russian Empire, to a family of Jurgis Bielinis, one of the best known Lithuanian book smugglers during the Lithuanian press ban. From about 1890, his father was searched by the police and did not live at home. In 1892, his father took him to Garšviai, where the Garšviai Book Smuggling Society was based, in hopes of teaching him same basic reading and writing. He had some other private tutors in Panevėžys and Sidabravas before enrolling into a realschule in Mitau (Jelgava) in fall 1894. After taking entrance exams, he was admitted to the Gymnasium of Nicholas I in Riga in fall 1895. Bielinis helped his father with book smuggling; for example, he helped to bind Lithuanian prayer books in Riga. In 1902, he met Jonas Biliūnas who gave him some social-democratic literature. He later met Augustinas Janulaitis and Kazimieras Venclauskis who encouraged him to join social-democratic causes. He organized a secret Lithuanian student society, which included Sofija Kymantaitė-Čiurlionienė and Vladas Nagevičius as members. He contributed articles to Darbininkų balsas, Ūkininkas, Naujienos and represented Riga at the 1903 conference of the Social Democratic Party of Lithuania in Vilnius. For social-democratic activities, he was expelled from the school. Together with others, he hectographed 160 copies of a booklet with revolutionary songs in 1904.

Bielinis was an active participant in the Russian Revolution of 1905. He gave the first public anti-Tsarist speeches in Kupiškis on 10 March, Skapiškis on 18 April, and Kurkliai on 23 April. He was arrested and beaten by the police, but his friends managed to free him and he continued to organize protest rallies and delivering public speeches. In total, he organized about 30 such events. Bielinis also organized social-democratic groups as well as smuggling and distribution of social-democratic publications. The Tsarist police started as many as 20 cases for his revolutionary activities but he evaded capture. In 1906, he even planned an armed attack on a police station in Ukmergė to free imprisoned Pranas Mažylis. He briefly lived in Vilnius before moving back to Riga. He helped with the publication of Naujoji gadynė (The New Era) and contributed articles to other Lithuanian periodicals, including Skardas, Žarija, Vilniaus žinios, Lietuvos ūkininkas, using as many as 40 different pen names to confuse the police. He also translated and published two brochures about Fasci Siciliani and permanent army and police by Emilia Pimenova. In Riga, Bielinis joined the Latvian Social Democratic Workers' Party and was arrested together with 15 other party members on 18 November 1907. After a year, he was sentenced to four years of hard labor. In 1912, he was exiled to Manzurka in the Kachugsky District, Irkutsk Oblast. He obtained a fake passport with the help of Felicija Bortkevičienė, escaped from Manzurka, and worked as a bookkeeper in Khor in the Khabarovsk Krai.

=== Independent Lithuania ===
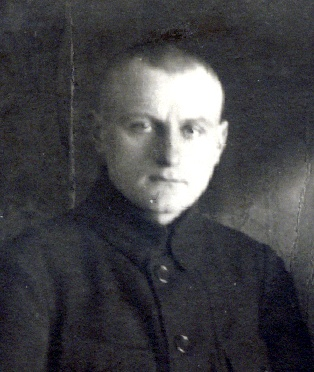
Bielinis in 1918

After the February Revolution, the Russian Provisional Government announced an amnesty to political prisoners and Bielinis arrived to Petrograd in summer 1917 where he rejoined the activities of the Social Democratic Party of Lithuania. He briefly worked at the Lithuanian section of the People's Commissariat for Nationalities. He returned to Lithuania in summer 1918 and started organizing local administration in Šiauliai. He continued to work at the administration keeping its finances as the city changed hands during the Lithuanian–Soviet War and organized partisan groups to fight the West Russian Volunteer Army. Bielinis helped reestablishing the Social Democratic Party in Lithuania and was named as one of the five board members in its registration with the Lithuanian government. The party faced pressure both from the illegal and more radical Communist Party of Lithuania and the Lithuanian government which treated it with suspicion. Bielinis was among 13 social democrats elected the Constituent Assembly of Lithuania in the April 1920 elections. His election profile stated his profession as bookkeeper.

Bielinis was an active member of the Constituent Assembly and a member of the parliamentary commissions on local self-governments, finance and budget, and education. He spoke frequently against the new Constitution of Lithuania and particularly its provisions for the President of Lithuania. He believed that a president posed danger to democracy and could lead to absolutism and monarchism. As a member of the opposition to the Lithuanian Christian Democratic Party, he spoke frequently against various proposals, e.g. against mandatory religious education in schools, provision of salaries to members of the clergy, or taxation of cooperatives, and presented several interpellations. He was not elected to the First Seimas in October 1922. He then traveled to United States from December 1922 to May 1923 visiting various communities of Lithuanian Americans, delivering speeches, and collecting donations for various social democratic causes in Lithuania. He was reelected to the Second Seimas in May 1923 and the Third Seimas in May 1926. Bielinis was one of the most active speakers during the parliamentary sessions. He spoke 247 times during 130 sessions out of 246 total sessions of the Second Seimas. He most frequently spoke about the state budget and other financial matters. Bielinis and other social democrats protested the coup d'état of December 1926 that brought President Antanas Smetona to power.

In addition to parliamentary work, Bielinis and Steponas Kairys were the most prominent leaders of the Lithuanian social democrats. Bielinis was periodically reelected to the central committee of the Social Democratic Party, becoming its chairman in 1923 and 1925. From March 1921 to January 1923, he was also editor-in-chief of the social democratic newspaper Socialdemokratas (Socialdemocrat). After the dismissal of the Third Seimas in March 1927, political activities of the opposition parties were restricted until all parties except for the ruling Lithuanian Nationalist Union were banned in 1936. Bielinis and Kairys attended the 4th congress of the Labour and Socialist International in Vienna in 1931, but more active political work in Lithuania was difficult. They both were briefly arrested in April 1929 when police searched the headquarters of the Social Democratic Party and found copies of the illegal Pirmyn (Forward) newspaper published by the plečkaitininkai. On 1 January 1928, Bielinis became chief of accounting at the Lithuanian Chamber of Agriculture. He also became director of the craft section at the Chamber encouraging traditional crafts such as weaving, knitting, ceramics. Bielinis organized a cooperative Marginiai (Assortment) to sell craft production and was its chairman. In 1921, he co-founded a cooperative book publishing company Kultūra (Culture) in Šiauliai. He was a board member of other cooperatives, including a bank and an insurance company. He was elected chairman of the Health Insurance Fund in Kaunas (these insurance funds were one of the few avenues for social democrats to participate in public life). Bielinis also collected materials for the history of the Social Democratic Party of Lithuania and wrote four volumes of memoirs. He managed to publish two of them about the Lithuanian press ban and the Russian Revolution of 1905 in 1958 and 1959. The third volume on World War I was published posthumously in 1971. The manuscript for the period between the revolution and World War I remained in Lithuania and was published by his nephew in 2012.

=== Occupied Lithuania and United States ===
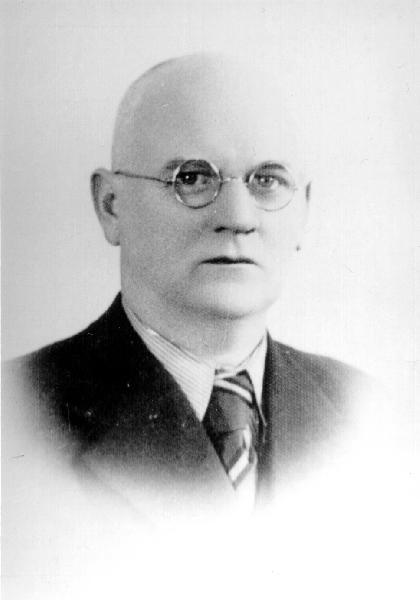
Bielinis in the 1930s

During World War II, Bielinis was a member of the Lithuanian resistance. After the German invasion of the Soviet Union in June 1941, Lithuanian social democrats reestablished their political organization, now known as the New Lithuania (Lithuanian: Naujoji Lietuva). It was chaired by Steponas Kairys with Bielinis acting as vice-chairman. In May 1942, New Lithuania published a proclamation which denounced both Soviet and German occupations. It was followed by a proclamation that urged Lithuanians to conserve their resources and not to join the German war effort. Various Lithuanian groups understood the need for a unified organization. In 1942, two such umbrella organizations were created – the Catholic-minded National Council, chaired by Juozas Ambrazevičius, and the atheist Supreme Committee of Lithuanians. Bielinis became responsible for the finances of the Supreme Committee. In November 1943, the two organizations merged into the Supreme Committee for the Liberation of Lithuania (VLIK), chaired by Kairys. Bielinis continued to be responsible for the finances of the merged organization. In April–May 1944, the Gestapo discovered VLIK and arrested a total of 27 VLIK members and supporters. Kairys went into hiding while Bielinis attempted to organize the "small" VLIK, which met six times in May–June 1944. Bielinis decided to transfer VLIK to Germany where Rapolas Skipitis, Vaclovas Sidzikauskas, and Mykolas Krupavičius resided. In July, the small VLIK retreated to Suvalkija and published several proclamations urging Lithuanians to defend Lithuania's independence from the advancing Red Army, i.e. to organize the partisan warfare against the Soviet Union.

Bielinis, like many other Lithuanian intellectuals, retreated west and in August 1944 arrived to Berlin. He joined VLIK and once again became responsible for its finances. He headed VLIK's finance committee which grew to become the Lithuanian National Foundation. Bielinis and others organized the Social Democratic Party of Lithuania in exile – they held a congress in September 1949 in Prien am Chiemsee, Germany, and sent out many declarations and memorandums to political leaders in Europe and United States concerning Lithuania's occupation, mass deportations, and other Soviet repressions. He was also a member of the special commission organizing the Lithuanian World Community and preparing the Lithuanian Charter in 1949. Bielinis moved to the United States in September 1949 and joined the cultural life of Lithuanian Americans, including the Lithuanian Socialist Federation – he established the federation's Book Fund in 1953. In 1951, he was one of the founders of the Lithuanian-American Community and a member of the Committee for a Free Lithuania, which was related to the National Committee for a Free Europe and later joined the Assembly of Captive European Nations. When VLIK moved to the United States in 1955, Bielinis rejoined its activities and was briefly its acting chairman from 3 October to 29 November 1964. In November 1964, he was elected to the seven-person board of VLIK. He also contributed articles social-democratic Lithuanian press, including newspapers Keleivis (Traveler), Naujienos (News), magazines Darbas (Work) and Darbininkų balsas (Voice of Workers). In 1963, he published Teroro ir vergijos imperija sovietų Rusija (Soviet Russia, the Empire of Terror and Slavery) in which he calculated Lithuania's demographic losses of about 1 million people during World War II and post-war Soviet terror, described the Soviet Gulag system, and presented examples of living conditions of camps in Vorkuta and elsewhere.

Bielinis died in 1965 in New York. On 30 May 1966, the ashes of Bielinis and Steponas Kairys were buried at the Lithuanian National Cemetery in Chicago, where a monument by architect Jonas Kova-Kovalskis was erected in 1979. Their urns were reburied at the Petrašiūnai Cemetery in Kaunas on 18 July 1996.
