= Committee for a Free Lithuania =

Lithuanian American political advocacy group

Committee for a Free Lithuania (Lithuanian: Lietuvos laisvės komitetas) was a political advocacy group of Lithuanian Americans established in 1951. Established on the initiative of the National Committee for a Free Europe and a member of the Assembly of Captive European Nations, the Committee for a Free Lithuania continued to protest the Soviet occupation of Lithuania, advocate for the continued recognition of the state continuity of the Baltic states, and promote the ultimate goal of independent Lithuania. It was funded by the United States and was a part of the larger ideological and propaganda effort directed against the Soviet Union. It was chaired by Vaclovas Sidzikauskas until his death in 1973. After his death and loss of funding, the committee diminished. It became somewhat more active again in the 1980s and was officially closed when Lithuania declared independence in March 1990.

== Relationship with other organizations ==
The National Committee for a Free Europe, which had ties with the Central Intelligence Agency, approached Povilas Žadeikis, the Lithuanian envoy in Washington D.C., about creating a Lithuanian committee. In February 1951, Žadeikis proposed seven men for the Lithuanian Consultative Panel (renamed to the Committee for a Free Lithuania on 1 October 1952). The membership of eight men was approved in May 1951: Vaclovas Sidzikauskas (chairman), Kipras Bielinis (treasurer), Antanas Trimakas (secretary), Bronius Nemickas, Juozas Audėnas, Mykolas Tolišius, Pranas Vainauskas, Martynas Brakas. Each member was selected to represent a different political party of interwar Lithuania. Its members could be only citizens of Lithuania. The committee was officially organized on 1 June 1951. Latvians and Estonians organized equivalent committees. The three committees worked closely and shared the same office in New York. The Lithuanian committee also established contacts and held meetings with Alexander Kerensky, a key political figure in the Russian Revolution of 1917, the Polish Political Council, and the Rada of the Belarusian Democratic Republic.

Lithuania's political aspirations for independence were represented by several groups – the Committee for a Free Lithuania, the Supreme Committee for the Liberation of Lithuania (VLIK), the Lithuanian Diplomatic Service, American Lithuanian Council (ALT), and the Lithuanian World Community (PLB). That necessitated coordination between these groups. They held a political conference on 18–19 May 1954 in New York but did not establish a unified political center. Other coordinating meetings were held on 4–5 July 1959 in anticipation of the state visit by Nikita Khrushchev, on 30 April – 1 May 1960 in anticipation of the 20th anniversary of the Soviet occupation, on 22–23 January 1966, on 9 January 1972 in anticipation of the Conference on Security and Co-operation in Europe, on 26–27 October 1974 to discuss the Helsinki Accords. However, the Committee for a Free Lithuania did not establish closer cooperation with other Lithuanian organizations or took the leading role among Lithuanian diaspora.

== Activities ==
One of the first tasks of the Committee for a Free Lithuania was to supply data, documents, and witnesses to the Kersten Committee, a select committee of the United States House of Representatives that investigated the occupation of the Baltic states. It also provided information on forced labor in the Soviet Union to the United Nations Economic and Social Council, published non-periodic Lithuanian-language political magazine Lietuva (Lithuania) in 1952–1956, joined Latvian and Estonian committees to establish the Baltic Freedom House and publish Baltic Review in English, French, and Spanish, organized events to mark the Captive Nations Week, monitored the Soviet press, and collected and analyzed information from behind the Iron Curtain. In November 1952, Radio Free Europe cancelled planned broadcasts in Lithuanian, Latvian, and Estonian (they were finally established in 1975) – one of the initial stated goals of the Committee for a Free Lithuania was to provide information and other support to the planned radio program. The cancellation was mandated by the United States Department of State which officially stated that such radio programs would duplicate the programs on the Voice of America. The statute of the Lithuanian committee provided that the committee could publish studies and monographs on economy, religion, or education in Lithuania, but no such books were published – unlike Polish or Slovak committees that were active in publishing. Sidzikauskas, as chairman of the Lithuanian committee, visited western Europe (Great Britain, Belgium, France, West Germany) in May 1963 and Brazil in February 1965. He was also a frequent member of the delegations to the United States Department of State to discuss foreign policy of the United States as it related to Soviet Union and Lithuania.

The committee joined and became an integral part of the Assembly of Captive European Nations (ACEN) when it was established in 1954. Sidzikauskas became involved with ACEN becoming its chairman in 1960–1961 and 1965–1966 and deputy chairman in 1959–1960 and 1971–1972. ACEN and the Committee for a Free Lithuania wrote numerous memorandums and protest notes to world leaders reminding of the Soviet occupation. They assessed and reacted to world events (e.g. Hungarian Revolution of 1956 or Suez Crisis) looking for an opportunities to raise the issue of Lithuania's and other occupied countries' independence. For example, in May 1955, on the 37th anniversary of the Constituent Assembly of Lithuania, 21 former members of the assembly issued a memorandum to parliament members of United States, Canada, and Great Britain; the Lithuanian committee issued a memorandum to Pope Pius XII when his apostolic letter of 29 June 1956 addressed the danger of the communism to the Catholic Church in Poland and other Eastern Bloc countries, but failed to include Lithuania; ACEN and the Lithuanian committee for several years lobbied for adding the issue of independence of Soviet-occupied territories to the agenda of the United Nations General Assembly; representatives of the Baltic states issued a joint manifesto on the 20th anniversary of the Soviet occupation in June 1960 (in response, the Parliamentary Assembly of the Council of Europe adopted a resolution condemning the occupation in September 1960); the Lithuanian committee published a memorandum on Soviet colonialism in the Baltic states in response to the decolonisation of Africa in 1961; ACEN held a meeting with the International League for the Rights of Man which issued a report condemning human rights violations in the Soviet Union in 1962. They also organized protests on historically important dates or when, for example, Nikita Khrushchev visited United States in 1959. All of these actions kept the issue of Lithuania's independence on the political agenda despite the general fatigue and increasing acceptance of the status quo in Eastern Europe.

At the same time, shifting Cold War politics had a direct impact on the Committee for a Free Lithuania. As the West placed hopes with the Khrushchev Thaw in the Soviet Union, funding for the committee was reduced. In January 1958, the paid staff of the committee was reduced from eight to six people. Officially, Kipras Bielinis and Pranas Vainauskas resigned from the committee. In 1965, the budget of ACEN and the Lithuanian committee was cut by 46%. The committee lost its funding from the Central Intelligence Agency in 1971 and was reorganized as a private institution. Its chairman Sidzikauskas died in 1973 and was replaced with Bronius Nemickas, but the committee was virtually inactive.
