= Kazimieras Venclauskis =

Lithuanian lawyer, politician, and philanthropist (1880–1940)

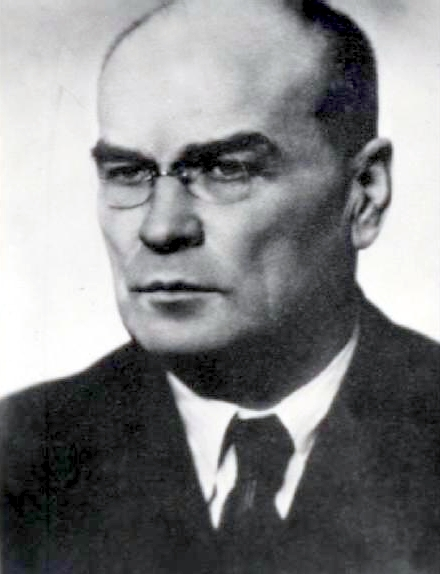
- Born: 27 February 1880; Juodeikiai, Kovno Governorate, Russian Empire
- Died: 24 February 1940 (aged 59); Šiauliai, Lithuania
- Education: University of Tartu
- Occupations: Attorney, politician
- Political party: Social Democratic Party of Lithuania
- Board member of: Varpas Society; Šiauliai City Council; Lithuanian Bar Association
- Spouse: Stanislava Jakševičiūtė-Venclauskienė
- Children: Daughter Gražbylė Venclauskaitė

Kazimieras Venclauskis (27 February 1880 – 24 February 1940) was a Lithuanian attorney, politician, and philanthropist.

After graduating from the University of Tartu and completing the mandatory five-year practice at a court and prosecutor's office, he moved to Šiauliai where he established a successful private law practice in 1908 and lived until his death. Venclauskis joined the Social Democratic Party of Lithuania in 1902 and was active during the Russian Revolution of 1905. He was elected to the Šiauliai City Duma in 1911 and planned to run in the election to the Russian State Duma in 1912, but an arrest by police spoiled the plans. He was an active member or chairman of various Lithuanian societies, including Žvaigždė and Jėga that organized Lithuanian schools and Varpas that organized amateur theater performances and other cultural events.

After World War I, he was briefly elected as the first burgermeister of Šiauliai. He was elected to the Constituent Assembly of Lithuania in May 1920 and reelected to the First Seimas in October 1922. He then returned to the Šiauliai City Council, serving as chairman (1925–1931) and member (1935–1939). His lucrative private attorney practice, which focused on commercial representation and arbitration, allowed him to become a philanthropist. Together with his wife, he sheltered and raised over a hundred orphans and foundlings and otherwise supported various students. In 1925, he became chairman of Kultūra Society which published Lithuanian books. He worked to establish a professional theater in Šiauliai in 1930 and co-founded a construction company to build a modern theater hall which has housed the Šiauliai Drama Theater since 1941. His former home in Šiauliai now hosts a section of the Šiauliai Aušros Museum.

== Biography ==
=== In Russian Empire ===
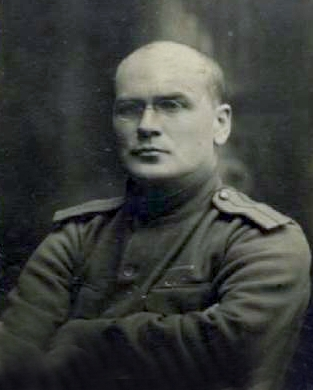
Venclauskis in 1915

Venclauskis was born to a family of Lithuanian peasants near Plungė. He studied at a primary school in Lieplaukė before transferring to Palanga Progymnasium. There he tutored future general Vladas Nagevičius and was a classmate with future President of Lithuania Antanas Smetona. Venclauskis then studied at the Liepāja Gymnasium in present-day Latvia. His parents wanted him to become a Catholic priest, but he refused and the parents discontinued their financial support. Due to poor living conditions, he contracted tuberculosis. Venclauskis tried studying engineering at the University of Saint Petersburg and medicine at the University of Warsaw before settling for law at the University of Tartu. He graduated in 1903. After a mandatory practice at a civil court in Riga, he worked as an interrogator in Kuressaare (Arensburg), and was assigned as deputy prosecutor in Siberia but decided to start a private practice in Šiauliai.

Already in 1902, Venclauskis joined the Social Democratic Party of Lithuania. He collaborated with Jonas Biliūnas, Augustinas Janulaitis, and Kipras Bielinis distributing illegal social democratic publications and with Jonas Jablonskis in smuggling Lithuanian books. During the Russian Revolution of 1905, he was active among Lithuanian social democrats in Riga and published two issues of a social democratic newspaper Pirmyn (Forward). He defended in court some of the people arrested for anti-Tsarist activities. Together with others, in 1907, he co-founded the Žvaigždė Society (star) which organized Lithuanian schools and libraries (it was chaired by writer Pranas Mašiotas and it maintained five schools near Riga with about 500 students in 1914). In 1908, he moved to Šiauliai where he established his law practice and lived until his death. He practiced civil law. A large part of his practice was arbitration of large commercial cases, particularly those involving Jewish or foreign businesses. In 1911, he was first elected to the Šiauliai City Duma. He was disciplined, but spoke and wrote little. He did not leave an archive or an autobiography. He did contribute a few short informational announcements about various cultural activities and events to Vilniaus žinios, Lietuvos ūkininkas, Lietuvos žinios.

In September 1908, Venclauskis became the first chairman of cultural organization Varpas (bell) which organized concerts, lectures, amateur theater performances. His wife, together with Gabrielius Landsbergis-Žemkalnis, directed several plays. Venclauskis co-directed a play in 1911. His activities attracted the attention of the Tsarist police. His home was searched and he was briefly arrested in September 1912. The arrest spoiled his plans for running in the elections to the Russian State Duma. During World War I, he organized aid to war refugees. When fighting reached Šiauliai, he retreated to Minsk. He worked as a jurist of the All-Russian Zemstvo Union dealing with the 10th Army. After the February Revolution, he became a justice of the peace in Minsk. He returned to Lithuania in summer 1917 or in June 1918. Venclauskis, together with Peliksas Bugailiškis and Stasys Lukauskis, managed to get a permission from the Ober Ost officials to reopen the Šiauliai Gymnasium. They organized Jėga Society (power, strength), chaired by Venclauskis, to support the school which opened in April 1918 with 200 students.

=== In independent Lithuania ===
==== Politics ====
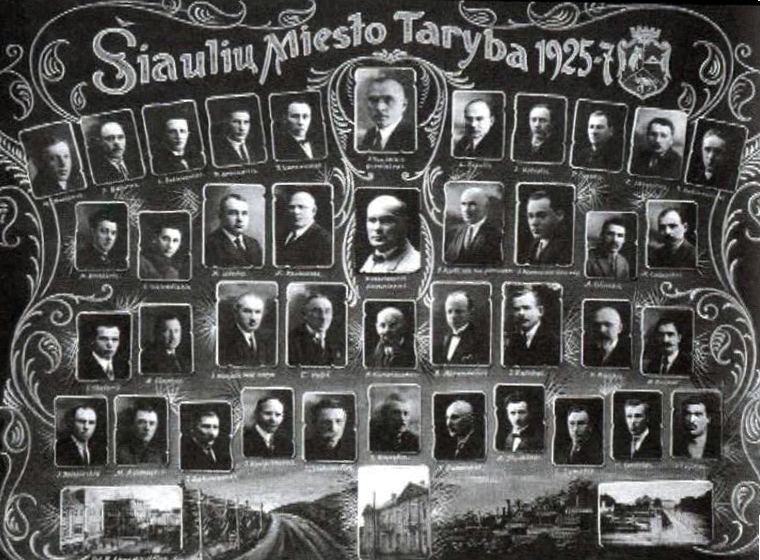
Members of the Šiauliai City Council in 1925–1927 (Venclauskis center, second row from top)

On 26 November 1918, Venclauskis was elected the first burgermeister of Šiauliai. He served until 17 April 1919 during the chaotic post-war period when the city changed hands during the Lithuanian–Soviet War. When the city was captured by the Bolsheviks in January 1919, Venclauskis agreed to work in the finance department of the communist city soviet. He worked on establishing local self-government and drafted a statute that was adopted by local councils in Šiauliai, Rokiškis, Utena. He was elected chairman of the Šiauliai district council and served until his election to the Constituent Assembly of Lithuania. After serving in the national parliament, Venclauskis returned to the Šiauliai City Council as chairman in 1925–1931 (Jackus Sondeckis was burgermeister at that time) and as member in 1935–1939.

Venclauskis, as a member of the Social Democratic Party of Lithuania (LSDP), was elected to the Constituent Assembly in May 1920 and reelected to the First Seimas in October 1922. His party was in opposition to the Lithuanian Christian Democratic Party (LKDP) which gained majority of seats. At the Constituent Assembly, he was a member of various parliamentary commissions, including those on economy and draft constitution. Due to the emergency caused by the Żeligowski's Mutiny in October 1920, the assembly established the seven-member Small Seimas to continue legislative function and temporarily adjourned. Venclauskis was elected as a member of the Small Seimas, but was soon replaced by Steponas Kairys. When drafting the new constitution, Venclauskis as other social democrats opposed creating the position of the President of Lithuania. He supported the rights of ethnic minorities in Lithuania and urged not to single out any particular minority for special treatment. Together with other members of his party, he submitted numerous interpellations. During discussions of one of these interpellations (in which LSDP asked why the police was not allowing or disrupting the celebrations of the International Workers' Day in Lithuania), Venclauskis engaged in a heated argument with LKDP leader Mykolas Krupavičius and was removed from the meeting. Venclauskis urged the government to adopt the law on amnesty and lift martial law which prevented the establishment of true democracy in Lithuania. Since LKDP ignored most of the proposals put forth by LSDP, Venclauskis and other members of his party protested by not voting for some of the major laws passed by Constituent Assembly, including the constitution and the land reform. He was reelected to the First Seimas, but it was deadlocked and functioned for only five months. When the Seimas was dissolved in March 1923, Vencklauskis returned to his private law practice and the Šiauliai City Council.

==== Law and business ====
Venclauskis house in Šiauliai, now a museum

In 1919–1920, Venclauskis briefly taught law at the Šiauliai Gymnasium. He was later offered a teaching position at the University of Lithuania, but refused. In 1920–1925, Venclauskis was elected as a member of the Lithuanian Bar Association. He was also long-term elder (starosta) of attorneys in Šiauliai. As such, he assigned criminal cases to practicing attorneys. Venclauskis was mainly a commercial attorney, representing Swedish and Swiss firms (including defense contractor Oerlikon Contraves). He worked on some high-profile cases, including a murder of a child in Žagarė, trials of several participants in the Tauragė Revolt, and corruption of diplomat Vaclovas Sidzikauskas. He took some pro bono cases related to child support or socialist-leaning activists. He opposed the death penalty. Venclauskis represented French graf Choiseul-Gouffier in a dispute with the Lithuanian government over large forest properties near Plateliai that the government wanted to nationalize according to the land reform of 1922. The case earned him enough fees to finance the construction of a palatial house by architect Kārlis Reisons in 1925–1927. It had his home and offices on the first floor, with two upper floors rented out. A fine example of modern interwar architecture, the house now hosts a section of the Šiauliai Aušros Museum and is listed on the Lithuanian Real Heritage Register.

In August 1919, Venclauskis co-founded and became board member of the Šiauliai Union of Consumer Cooperatives. The union had about 100 cooperative members, but was absorbed by the state-sponsored Lietūkis cooperative in 1928. Together with Vladas Sirutavičius, Venclauskis founded construction corporation Pastogė (shelter). It had plans of building a large culture center and a hotel, but managed to finish just a movie theater before the outbreak of World War II. Since 1941, the premises are used by the Šiauliai Drama Theater. Venclauskis supported various other business enterprises, often loaning money to various factories.

==== Culture and philanthropy ====
In addition to raising his two daughters, Venclauskis and his wife sheltered and raised a number of orphans and foundlings. The exact number is not known, but is rumored to be around two hundred. The Šiauliai Gymnasium was built on land of his father-in-law Jonas Jakševičius. As a compensation, the Tsarist government granted a privilege that three future generations of Jakševičius could attend the school for free. This motivated Venclauskis to adopt and foster many students who could then study for free. He built a villa in Palanga which was mainly occupied by the foster children. In his home in Šiauliai, on average, there were about 20 people. Reportedly, Venclauskis requested that there would be no more than 30 people sheltered in his home, but this quota was often exceeded. Venclauskis did not spend much time with the children and was distant with rare exceptions on vacations at the seaside or holidays, but gladly provided financial support. Venclauskis was one of the key donors of societies organized to support students at the Šiauliai Gymnasium (established in 1891) and social-democratic youth (established in 1925).

In November 1920, Venclauskis was one of the co-founders of the Kultūra Society and became its chairman in 1925. The society focused on publishing Lithuanian books, primarily various textbooks. In 1921–1927, the society published 140 different books as well as a monthly magazine Kultūra (Culture). It also organized numerous local chapters (membership peaked at 250 chapters with 3,000 members) that used the slogan Švieskis ir šviesk! (learn and teach!) to organize various cultural and educational activities. The local chapters were abolished by the authoritarian regime of president Antanas Smetona in 1927. Textbooks published by Kultūra were forbidden to be used in schools. The society could not sell its books and repay loans it took out to cover publishing costs. Venclauskis, as a debt guarantor, had to pay 10,000 litas as a result. It was officially dissolved in July 1929. Venclauskis worked to establish a professional theater in Šiauliai. In 1925, Kultūra Society took over the only theater and cinema hall which after the liquidation of the society became property of Venclauskis and several other men. They finally managed to get the Šiauliai Theater established in 1930. Venclauskis was active in various other cultural and charitable societies; he was a member of the Masonic lodge Lietuva, established in July 1920, and became a member of the newly established Rotary Club in Šiauliai in June 1938.

Venclauskis became ill in 1939. He sought treatment in a sanatorium in Riga and had an operation, but died in February 1940.
