= Vidas Pinkevičius =

Lithuanian monumental decorative painter

- Born: Vydas Pinkevičius; November 9, 1949; Gruzdžiai
- Died: April 12, 2012 (aged 62); Klaipėda
- Education: Vilnius Art Institute
- Spouse: Felicija Kačenauskaitė-Pinkevičienė
- Children: Vidas Pinkevičius
- Parents: Antanas Pinkevičius (father); Ona Pinkevičienė (mother)

Vidas Pinkevičius was a Lithuanian monumental decorative painter.

== Biography ==
In 1968, he graduated from Gruzdžiai High School and then entered the Vilnius Art Institute (now the Vilnius Academy of Arts), where he studied mosaic frescoes. In 1973, after graduating from the Art Institute, he moved to Klaipėda, where he worked at the 21st Vocational Technical School.

Between 1974 and 1975, he was forced to serve in the Soviet army and brought back many drawings from this experience. From 1975 to 2012, he taught painting and composition at the Adamas Brakas School in Klaipėda.

From 1973, the artist took part in group exhibitions not only in Klaipėda, but also throughout Lithuania and abroad. He also organized numerous solo exhibitions in Klaipėda, Vilnius, Šiauliai, Juknaičiai, as well as abroad: notably in Latvia, the USA, Sweden, Italy, Russia, etc.

Vidas Pinkevičius became a member of the Lithuanian Artists' Association in 1986.

He married Felicija Kačenauskaitė-Pinkevičienė herself a graphic artist, from whom he had a son, Vidas Pinkevičius, an internationally renowned organist.

== His Artwork ==
The painter created numerous frescoes, including:

- Two Roosters (lt: Du gaideliai) in 1973 in collaboration with Juozas Vosylius.
- History of Medications (lt: Vaistų istorija) in 1976, Klaipėda Sportininkų Street Pharmacy (1976).

Towards the end of the 1970s, Vidas Pinkevičius focused exclusively on easel paintings. His works have a variety of themes: portraits, visions of former Soviet soldiers, seaside landscapes, details of a harbor town (Klaipėda), historical, mythological and religious motifs, allegorically symbolic studies of fictional reality, and panoramic images of festivals and folk rituals. The artist was interested in the problems of human existence, and in the past and present of his native country.

According to art historian Petras Šmitas:

"Drawing on his creative imagination from the work of the old masters, Pinkevičius's paintings blend the vision of a representation with abstract, impulsive combinations of shapes, splashes of color, and brushstrokes. His spontaneous, passionate, emotional, and expressive paintings are unique and easily recognizable. His committed pictorial style is contemporary and firmly rooted in the recent history of Lithuanian painting"

His works are held by the Lithuanian National Museum of Art (Vilnius)the Lithuanian Museum of Ethnocosmology (Molėtai district), the 1863 Uprising Museum (Paberžė), the Samogitian Art Museum (Plungė) and private collectors in Lithuania and abroad.

== Exhibitions ==
=== Abroad ===
- 1981 - Exhibition of the Association of Young Artists. Moscow-Tashkent
- 1982 - Group exhibition of paintings. Liepaja, Latvian SSR
- 1982 - Soviet Union Art Exhibition. Moscow, Russian SSR
- 1984 - Artists' Association exhibition “Earth and Man”. Moscow, Russian SSR
- 1988 - Klaipėda Artists' Exhibition. Cuba
- 2007 - Klaipėda artists' group exhibition. Kaliningrad, Russian Federation

=== In Lithuania ===
==== Solo exhibitions ====
- 1978 - Exhibition of drawings. Klaipėda
- 1981 - Exhibition of paintings. Juknaičiai
- 1982 - Exhibition of paintings and drawings. Klaipėda
- 1985 - Exhibition of paintings. Klaipėda - Šiauliai - Vilnius
- 1989 - Exhibition to mark Vidas Pinkevičius's 40th birthday. Exhibition hall in Klaipėda.
- 1993 - Exhibition to mark the visit of Pope John Paul II to the Hill of Crosses. Gallery “Laiptai”. Šiauliai
- 1999 - "Crossroads" exhibition. Klaipėda Exhibition Center.
- 1999 - Vidas Pinkevičius jubilee exhibition. Klaipėda Exhibition Center.
- 2000 - Exhibition “Crossroads - 2000”. Klaipėda Exhibition Center.
- 2000 - Exhibition at the “Paletė” gallery. Klaipėda
- 2001 - Exhibition “Not a day without a line...”. Gallery “D”. Klaipėda
- 2001 - Exhibition at “Rutu” gallery. Klaipeda
- 2003 - Exhibition “Memories”. Paletė gallery. Klaipėda
- 2004 - Exhibition “Crossroads”. Gallery in Klaipėda.
- 2005 - Exhibition at the “Paletė” gallery. Klaipeda
- 2006 - Exhibition at Klaipėda University Gallery. Klaipėda
- 2007 - Exhibition "Gardens". I. Simonaitytė Library. Klaipėda
- 2009 - Exhibition “Journey”. Giruliai Library. Klaipėda
- 2009 - Exhibition “Colourful Silence”. Klaipėda Concert Hall. Klaipėda
- 2010 - Exhibition “Colourful Silence”. Trakai Street Gallery. Šiauliai
- 2010 - Exhibition “Colourful Silence”. Šulinys” Gallery. Kernavė
- 2013 - Exhibition “Life - Painting”. Exhibition hall of the KCCC. Klaipėda
- 2014 - Exhibition “ Life - Painting ”. Vilnius City Hall.

==== Group Exhibitions ====
Since the beginning of his career, Vidas' works have been exhibited in more than 40 group exhibitions in Lithuania.
