= Brutus Coste =

Romanian diplomat

Brutus Coste

Brutus Coste (10 February 1910 – 3 September 1984) was a Romanian diplomat whose service was cut short by the Second World War and who spent most of the rest of his life as an anti-communist campaigner in the United States. When U.S. government funding and interest in East European émigrés waned, Coste took up an academic position at Fairleigh Dickinson University in New Jersey. He did not live to see the fall of the Ceaușescu regime.

== Early life and family ==
Coste was born in Ciacova, Banat, on 10 February 1910. His parents were attorney Iuliu Coste (1876–1967) and his wife Zoe. Iuliu Coste was prefect of Timiș-Torontal County twice in the 1920s. Brutus had two sisters, Zoe and Hortensia, and a brother, Zeno.

== Career ==
Coste entered the Romanian diplomatic service in 1933 and was secretary and later counsellor for the Romanian legations in Paris and London. Subsequently, he was chargé d'affaires in Washington and Lisbon.

Between 1940 and 1947, he reported regularly to Romania on the position concerning the funds of the Romanian National Bank in the United States and the activities of the Swedish legation in Washington who looked after Romanian interest in the U.S. during the Second World War and immediately afterwards.

In 1945, when the communists came to power in Romania after the end of the war, Coste did not support the new regime. From 1946 to 1947 he was secretary general of the unofficial delegation of Romanian political parties at the Paris Peace Conference, after which he moved to New York City and became a political adviser to General Nicolae Rădescu, the last pre-communist prime minister of Romania.

Around 1954, Coste became director of the International League for the Rights of Man, and the representative of that organisation at the United Nations. He worked on a project titled "Democracy in Russia" for which he received a monthly payment of $300 from the CIA-funded National Committee for a Free Europe (NCFE) as part of their policy of supporting anti-communist émigré groups from Eastern Europe in the United States.

From 1954 to 1965, he was secretary general of the Assembly of Captive European Nations (ACEN) where he criticised the policy of U.S. president Lyndon Johnson of "building bridges" with Eastern European countries which he saw as delaying the collapse of the communist regimes in those countries. He claimed that his removal as head of ACEN was engineered by the NCFE, sponsors of ACEN and Radio Free Europe, because of his criticism of the Johnson administration's policy. By that time, the money to support anti-communist activity by émigrés in the U.S. was drying up and there was a general feeling in government circles that those groups had little sway in their home countries.

From 1965 to 1967, Coste was a consultant to the Foreign Policy Research Institute of the University of Pennsylvania and a special assistant to the president of the Institute for American Strategy.

== Later life ==
From 1967 to 1976, Coste was an associate professor, then professor emeritus, of international relations and world history at Fairleigh Dickinson University in New Jersey. From its formation in 1973, he headed the Truth About Romania Committee.

== Death ==
Coste died at the Memorial Sloan-Kettering Cancer Center in New York on 3 September 1984. He was survived by his wife Constance. He did not live to see the fall of the communist regime in Romania.

== Papers ==
Papers relating to Coste's life are held in 85 boxes at the Hoover Institution.
