= Kazys Bobelis =

Lithuanian surgeon and politician

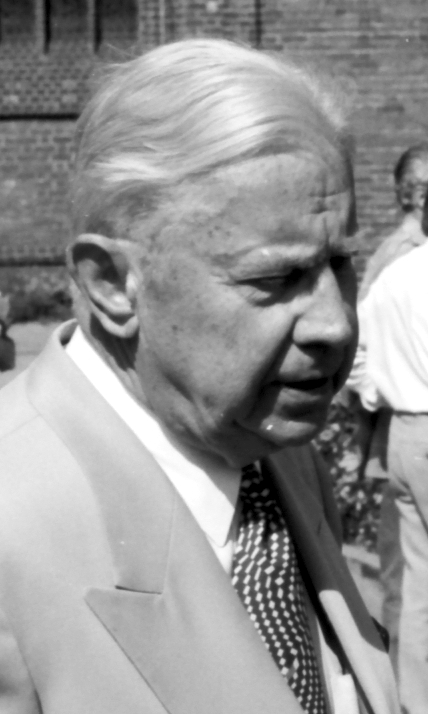
- Kazys Bobelis in 1997

Member of Seimas
- In office 1992 – 31 May 2006
- Constituency: Marijampolė

Personal details
- Born: 4 March 1923 Kaunas, Lithuania
- Died: 30 September 2013 (aged 90) St. Petersburg, Florida, U.S.
- Resting place: Lithuanian National Cemetery
- Party: Lithuanian Christian Democratic Party; Union of Christian Democrats
- Spouse: Dalia Bobelis
- Children: Aldona, Alena, Rūta, Algis & Jonas
- Education: Vytautas Magnus University; University of Graz; University of Tübingen

Kazys Bobelis (4 March 1923 – 30 September 2013) was a Lithuanian surgeon and politician.

== Biography ==
Bobelis was born in Kaunas. His father was Colonel Jurgis Bobelis (1885–1954). In 1941, Bobelis participated in the June Uprising against the Bolsheviks. Bobelis studied medicine at Vytautas Magnus University (Lithuania), University of Graz (Austria) and University of Tübingen (Germany). In 1948, he graduated maxima cum laude from Tübingen. In 1949 he moved to the United States and lived in Chicago, working as a surgeon. From 1962 to 1972, he was a professor of clinical surgery at Loyola University Chicago. From 1978 to 1991 he was a private doctor.

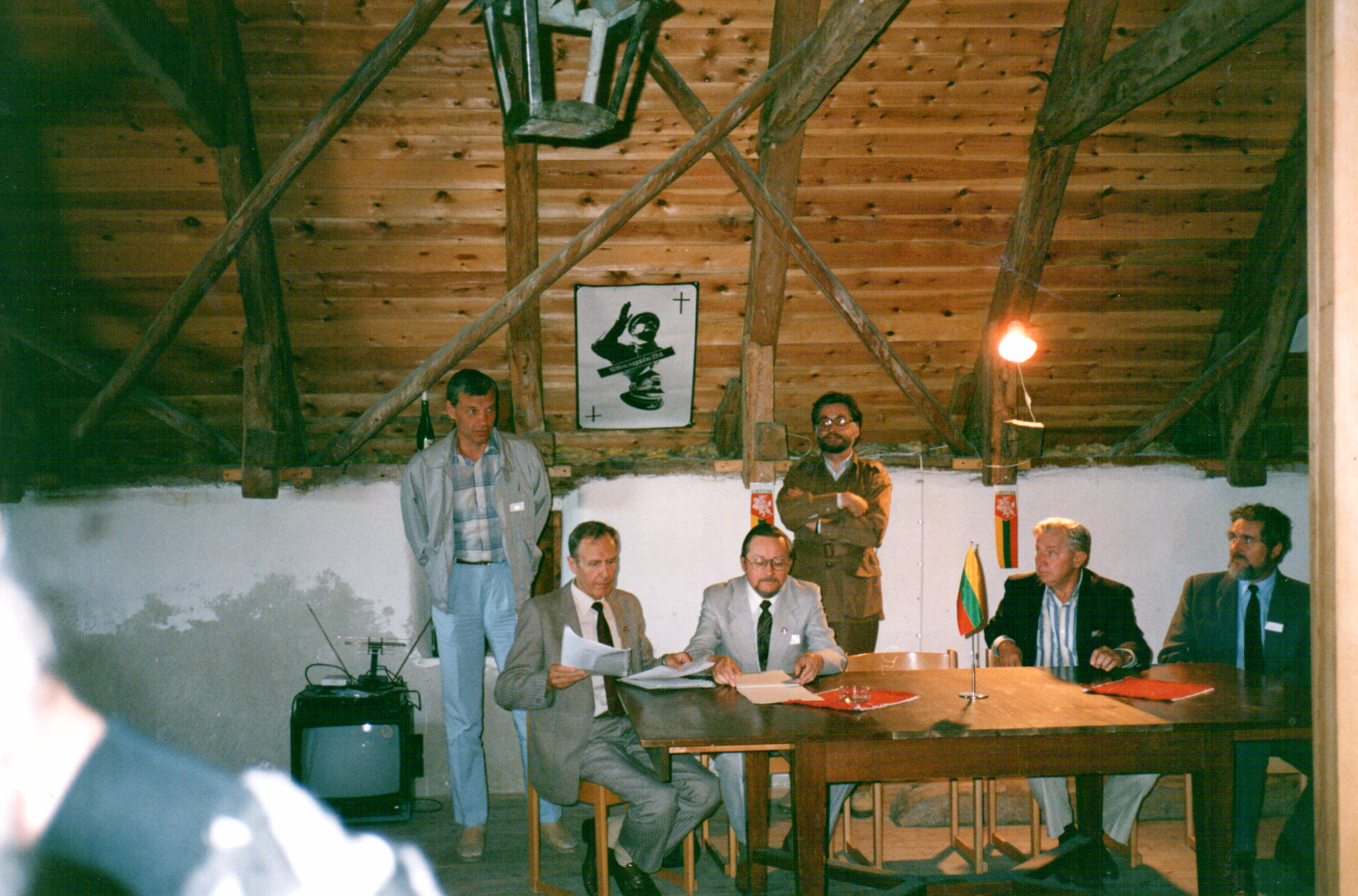
Signing the Gotland Declaration in 1989, Kazys Bobelis is second from the right

While in the United States, Bobelis was active in the Lithuanian immigrant community. From 1962 to 1976, he served on the board of the Lithuanian American Congress. In 1979 he became the chairman of the Supreme Committee for the Liberation of Lithuania (VLIK).

In 1992 he returned to Lithuania. From 1992 to 31 May 2006, he was a member of the Seimas for the Marijampolė constituency. In 1997, he was a candidate for president and received 3.91% of the vote.

From 1996 to 2000, he was president of the Lithuanian Baseball Association. Bobelis was a member of the Catholic youth and student organization Ateitis.

== Family ==
He was married to Dalia. They had five children: Aldona, Alena, Rūta, Algis and Jonas. They had a sixth child, Julius (1960–1977), who died at age 17 from colon cancer.

== Awards and honors ==
- 1976: Riflemen's Star
- 1984: Order of St. Gregory the Great
- 1986: Ellis Island Medal of Honor
- 1995: Swedish Royal Order
- 1993: Order of the Cross of Vytis
- 2004: Commander's Grand Cross of the Order of Vytautas the Great
- 2004: Honorary citizen of Marijampolė
