= Lithuanian National Cemetery =

Cemetery in Cook County, Illinois, US

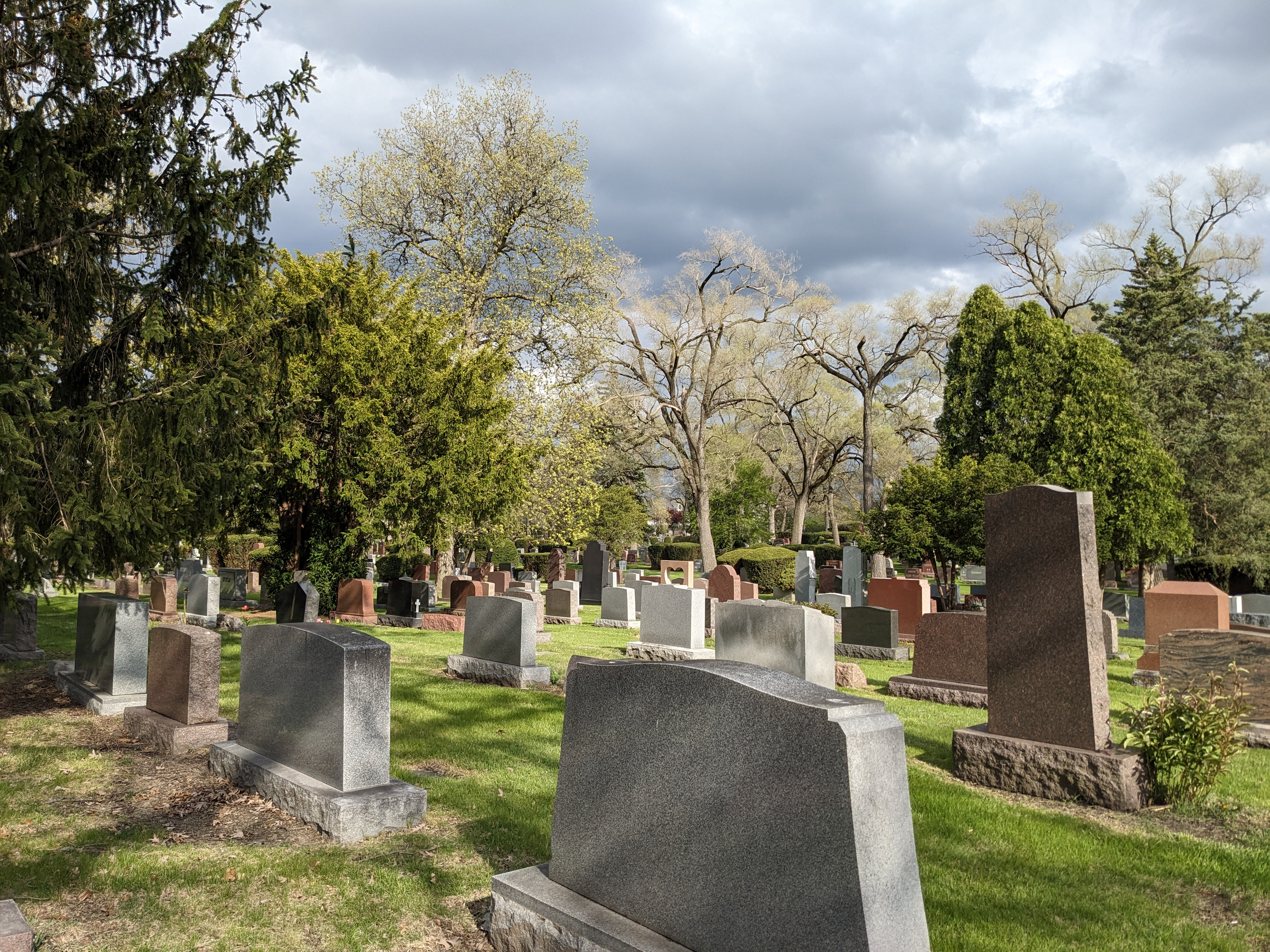
- Lithuanian National Cemetery
- Interactive map of Lithuanian National Cemetery

Details
- Established: 1911
- Location: Justice, IL
- Country: United States
- Coordinates: 41°44′28″N 87°50′44″W
- Owned by: Non-profit organization
- Size: Aprrox. 80 acres (32 ha) in 1986
- No. of interments: More than 13,000
- Website: http://lithuaniannationalcemetery.org/
- Find a Grave: Lithuanian National Cemetery

The Lithuanian National Cemetery (Lithuanian: Lietuvių tautinės kapinės) is a non-profit cemetery in Justice, Illinois, that mainly serves the Lithuanian American community in Chicago. Established in 1911, it is the resting place of many prominent Lithuanians in politics, culture, and science.

== History ==
As the Lithuanian immigration to the United States increased, Lithuanians in Chicago established the Catholic cemetery of Saint Casimir in 1903. However, this cemetery would accept only Catholics for burials. The cemetery was controlled by Matas Kriaučiūnas, priest of St. George parish, who was suspected of embezzling parish's funds. The growing number of Lithuanian intellectuals felt the need for a non-religious Lithuanian cemetery. The idea was met with approval in February 1911 and the new cemetery was organized on 28 March 1911. The founding members were 21 different Lithuanian societies and organizations. The organizers purchased 21 acres (8.5 ha) of land. The purchase price of $10,000 (equivalent to $345,536 in 2025) was divided into bonds of $50 or $100 that were sold to Lithuanian organizations. The bonds paid 3% interest and were redeemed by 1921.

The cemetery was officially opened on 30 May 1912 (the Memorial Day). The first burial was a two-year-old child reinterred from the Saint Casimir Cemetery. The cemetery was blessed by Stasys Mickevičius, founder of the Lithuanian National Catholic Church (who is buried at the cemetery). The cemetery was and still is open to all regardless of religious or political convictions. In 1934, the cemetery purchased additional 40 acres. In 1937, the cemetery added an office building (in the Art Deco style) and a columbarium for cremated remains.

The cemetery has a monument to Vincas Kudirka (he is not buried there). A traditional Lithuanian wayside shrine made of steel 18 feet (5.5 m) in height was erected in 1995 to commemorate Soviet deportations from Lithuania in 1941–1952. Many of the headstones, particularly of those emigrants who were forced to leave due to the Soviet occupation, bear Lithuanian symbols – traditional wayside shrines and crosses, folk sashes, kanklės, Lithuanian coat of arms, Columns of Gediminas, Tower of Gediminas, etc. After Lithuania regained independence in 1990, some of the remains were returned to Lithuania. It remains the only Lithuanian cemetery in Chicago as the St. Casimir Cemetery officially dropped "Lithuanian" from its name in 1997.

== Notable burials ==
- Juozas Adomaitis-Šernas (1859–1922), newspaper editor
- Kipras Bielinis (1883–1965), Lithuanian politician (reburied at the Petrašiūnai Cemetery in 1996)
- Vaclovas Biržiška (1884–1956), Lithuanian bibliographer
- Viktoras Biržiška (1886–1964), Lithuanian mathematician
- Kazys Bobelis (1923–2013), Lithuanian surgeon and anti-Soviet activist
- Jonas Budrys (1889–1964), Lithuanian intelligence officer, commander of the Klaipėda Revolt, consul in New York
- Pijus Grigaitis (1883–1969), long-term editor of Naujienos
- Kazys Grinius (1866–1950), President of Lithuania (reburied at his birthplace in 1994)
- Vladas Jakubėnas (1904–1976), Lithuanian composer
- Steponas Kairys (1879–1964), signatory of the Act of Independence of Lithuania (reburied at the Petrašiūnai Cemetery in 1996)
- Marius Katiliškis (1914–1980), Lithuanian writer
- Rapolas Skipitis (1887–1976), Lithuanian Minister of the Interior
- Jonas Šliūpas (1861–1944), Lithuanian activist (cremated in Germany; urn with ashes buried at the cemetery in 1948)
- Maurice Tillet known as The French Angel (1903–1954), French professional wrestler, buried in the same grave as his Lithuanian friend Karl Pojello (1893–1954)
- Adomas Varnas (1879–1979), Lithuanian painter
