= Iuliu Coste =

Romanian politician (1876–1967)

Iuliu Coste (26 April 1876, Nădlac, Arad, Romania|jud. Arad, Banat, – 8 December 1967, Timisoara, Romania) was a Romanian attorney and politician.

== Life ==
Iuliu Coste attended primary school in his hometown and high school in Makó and Chisinau-Cris and studied Law in Oradea and Budapest. In 1899 he passed the bar exam and in 1903 started his own office in Arad. Later he established an office in Ciacova, until he moved to Timisoara in 1921.

In 1916 he was drafted into the KuK Infantry Regiment Nr. 61 in Timisoara for a year. In 1918 he was one of the delegates for Ciacova for the Great National Assembly of Alba Iulia on 1 December. The delegation he was part of, failed to reach Alba Iulia because the group was arrested at the station in Timisoara by Serbian military forces and detained until 2 December.

After the union of Transsylvania with Romania, Coste joined the National Liberal Party and established the Timisoara chapter of the party in 1930.

He held the position of prefect of Timiș-Torontal twice, from 4 February 1922 – 4 July 1925 and 27 June 1927 – 15 November 1928.

After the establishment of the royal dictatorship by King Carol II in 1938, he became president of the Timisoara chapter of the National Renaissance Front (Romanian: Frontul Renașterii Naționale, FRN).

He practiced law until his retirement in 1947. For his merits for the community, he was awarded the Order of the Romanian Crown. His life in communist Romania was difficult: in 1952 he was arrested as an "enemy of the state" and released after 9 months in detention. He subsequently lost his pension. His son Brutus Coste was a diplomat who had emigrated to the United States in 1947.

== Family ==
Iuliu Coste and his wife Zoe had two sons, Brutus and Zeno, and two daughters, Zoe and Hortensia.

== Literature ==
Dumitru Tomoni :REGIONALISMUL CULTURAL ÎN BANATUL INTERBELIC. ÎNFIINŢAREA ŞI ORGANIZAREA REGIONALEI „ASTRA BĂNĂŢEANĂ"

Transilvania: revistă lunară de cultură, 1918-12-01

Maria Berényi: Cultură românească la Budapesta în secolul al XIX-lea, 2000

Cornel Sigmirean: Elită și destin național. Bursierii „Gojdu” în perioada interbelică. Elite and national destiny. “Gojdu” scholarships in the interwar period, 2019
