= Socialist Union of Central-Eastern Europe =

The Socialist Union of Central-Eastern Europe (abbreviated 'S.U.C.E.E') was a coalition of émigré social democratic parties from Eastern Europe during the Cold War years. SUCEE had its headquarters in London. The 1959 Hamburg conference of SUCEE proclaimed as the goals of the organization to struggle for national independence, multiparty democracy, the right to organize trade unions, and against 'Russification' of any kind. The organization published the bulletin Labour's Call from Behind the Iron Curtain.

== Founding ==
SUCEE was founded after an initiative of the International Socialist Commission to appeal to the Polish, Czechoslovakian, Hungarian, Yugoslav and Bulgarian socialist parties to form a common centre for coordination of their work in exile. These five parties met in London on July 4–5, 1949 and founded SUCEE as a joint organization. A SUCEE conference held in Paris later the same year decided to invite the Estonian, Latvian, Lithuanian and Ukrainian exiled socialist parties to join as members.

The 1951 founding congress of the Socialist International in Frankfurt defined the relationship between the International and SUCEE. SUCEE became an associated organization of the Socialist International, and SUCEE was allowed to send four consultative delegates to the meetings of the General Council of the Socialist International. However, the member parties of SUCEE were also allowed to obtain individual memberships in the International.

The SUCEE conference held in Frankfurt in 1951 decided to invite the Romanian socialists to become a member of the organization. The 1954 Amsterdam conference of SUCEE, noting the discourse on peaceful co-existence, declared that seeking peace would not mean any interruption in the "political and ideological offensive" against communism and "Soviet domination". Nor would any appreciation of peaceful co-existence indicate an acceptance of the division of Europe on behalf of the Eastern European socialists in exile.

== Organization ==
SUCEE had two organs, the conference and the executive committee. The conference was supposed to be held once every year. SUCEE conferences were held in London (1949), Paris (1949), Copenhagen (1950), London (1951), Frankfurt (1951), Milan (1952), Stockholm (1953), Amsterdam (1954), London (1955), Copenhagen (1956), Vienna (1957), Strassbourg (1958) and Hamburg (1959).

As of the late 1950s and early 1960s, the executive committee of SUCEE consisted of Zygmunt Zaremba (chairman), Brūno Kalniņš (vice chairman), Živko Topalović (vice chairman), Vilém Bernard (secretary) and Imre Szelig (treasurer). In 1961 Brūno Kalniņš became the chairman of SUCEE, and would continue in this function until 1986.

SUCEE maintained contacts with the Special Committee of Non-Represented Peoples of the European Consultative Assembly and participated in the Assembly of Captive European Nations.

== Members ==
The following parties were members of SUCEE:

- Bulgarian Socialist Party in exile
- Czechoslovak Social Democratic Party in exile
- Estonian Socialist Party in exile
- Social Democratic Party of Hungary in exile
- Social Democratic Party of Latvia in exile
- Polish Socialist Party in exile
- Romanian Socialist Party in exile
- Ukrainian Socialist Party in exile
- Yugoslav Socialist Party in exile
