= Varpas Society =

Lithuanian cultural organization

Varpas Society (varpas means bell) was a cultural society active in Šiauliai, then part of the Russian Empire and later Lithuania, from 1908 to 1923. Almost every Saturday it would host an event. Its amateur theater staged some 100 different plays up to 1915 when the city was occupied by the Germans during World War I. Its choir and a string orchestra organized various concerts while educational lectures were delivered by prominent figures in Lithuanian culture. The society maintained a small library, but it was destroyed during the war. The society was abolished by the Ober Ost officials but was reestablished in 1917. Faced with post-war difficulties and frequently changing leadership, it was not very active and was officially dissolved in 1923.

== History ==
=== Establishment ===
The Lithuanian press ban was lifted in 1904 and the ban on organizing various clubs and societies was lifted due to the Russian Revolution of 1905. Lithuanians, active in the Lithuanian National Revival, began organizing cultural and educational societies (for example, Daina Society in Kaunas or Žiburys Society in the Suwałki Governorate). Activists in Šiauliai submitted a proposal for a cultural Viltis Society (hope) in 1905, but it was rejected by the Tsarist authorities as its program was deemed too broad. The decision was appealed and the revised statute was approved in September 1908. The founding meeting took place on 28 September. It elected the first board (chairman Kazimieras Venclauskis, secretary Stanislava Bogušytė-Skipitienė, treasurer Antanas Povylius) and admitted the first 55 members. In 1909, Antanas Mikševičius became the chairman. In 1911, the society had 152 members.

=== Activities ===
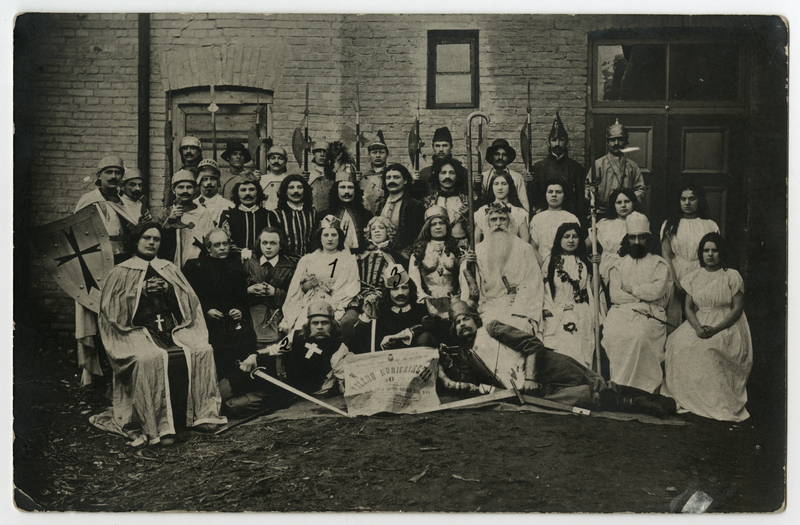
Actors of the historical opera about Pilėnai (1910)

The society was known for its many amateur theater performances. Its first play was a historical drama about the Grand Duke Kęstutis by Adam Asnyk. The society had four theater directors – Stanislava Jakševičiūtė-Venclauskienė (wife of Kazimieras Venclauskis), Jonas Misius, Ona Pleirytė-Puidienė, and Gabrielius Landsbergis-Žemkalnis. They staged various plays, including The Bear by Anton Chekhov, plays by Herman Heijermans, Leo Tolstoy, Jerzy Żuławski, Eliza Orzeszkowa, Eduard von Keyserling, as well as by Lithuanian authors – Aleksandras Fromas-Gužutis, Vydūnas, Juozas Tumas-Vaižgantas, Liudas Gira. The largest production was a five-act historical opera about Pilėnai which included about 50 performers (directed by Landsbergis-Žemkalnis in 1910). The directors competed with each other raising the quality of the productions but also resulting in conflicts. Pleirytė-Puidienė and Misius established their own troupe separate from the Varpas Society though continued to participate in its activities. The plays needed to be approved by the Tsarist censors. Since very few censors knew the Lithuanian language, approvals could take a long time. Therefore, the society often staged the plays only for its members – such plays did not need approvals from the censors. The society also staged a few plays (e.g. a play by Marcel Gerbidon and The Power of Darkness by Leo Tolstoy) that were explicitly forbidden by the censors. The theater performances were followed by music, dances, games, etc. that would last to the early hours of the morning. The society performed not only in Šiauliai but also in Joniškis, Kuršėnai, Radviliškis, Viekšniai.

In addition to plays, the society organized events almost every Saturday – concerts, educational lectures on literature, theater, medicine, natural sciences, etc. Speakers included physician Petras Avižonis, writers Gabrielė Petkevičaitė-Bitė, Vydūnas, Juozas Tumas-Vaižgantas. The society had a 70–80-member choir and a 20-member string orchestra that was established in collaboration with the Šiauliai Gymnasium. The choir performed mainly Lithuanian folk songs harmonized by Stasys Šimkus (who served as choir's conductor in 1912–1914) and other composers. The society also maintained a library of mainly Lithuanian publications. In 1910, it served about 50 regular readers who borrowed 493 books. The readers included poets Julius Janonis and Jonas Krikščiūnas (Jovaras). In 1911, the society purchased a five-room house and renovated it – added a stage, rooms for artists and society's library. By 1914, the society outgrew this space and was planning to rent the Kasino Theater which would have allowed the society to raise its amateur theater to a professional theater, but the plans were interrupted by World War I.

=== Post-war ===
During World War I, the society's premises with its library and archives burned down in April 1915 and the society was abolished by the Ober Ost officials who banned any societies in the occupied area. Varpas Society was reestablished in 1917 and was briefly known as the Kanklės Society. It was more active in 1920 when it staged an operetta by Mikas Petrauskas, performed plays by Sofija Kymantaitė-Čiurlionienė, organized a concert by Mikas and Kipras Petrauskas and Antanas Sodeika, hosted lectures by Vydūnas. Proceeds from the events benefited the Lithuanian Scientific Society, Žiburėlis, or other charitable causes. The society struggled due to post-war economic difficulties, frequently changing leadership, and competition from other cultural organizations. In 1918, the society managed to purchase a house from the retreating Germans. During the war, about 65% of buildings in Šiauliai were destroyed. Therefore, many other societies and organizations, including courts and hospitals, wanted to use the premises. Eventually, it was transferred to the 8th Infantry Regiment in May 1923. Without funds to purchase another space, the society officially liquidated.
