= Marius Katiliškis =

Lithuanian writer (1914–1980)

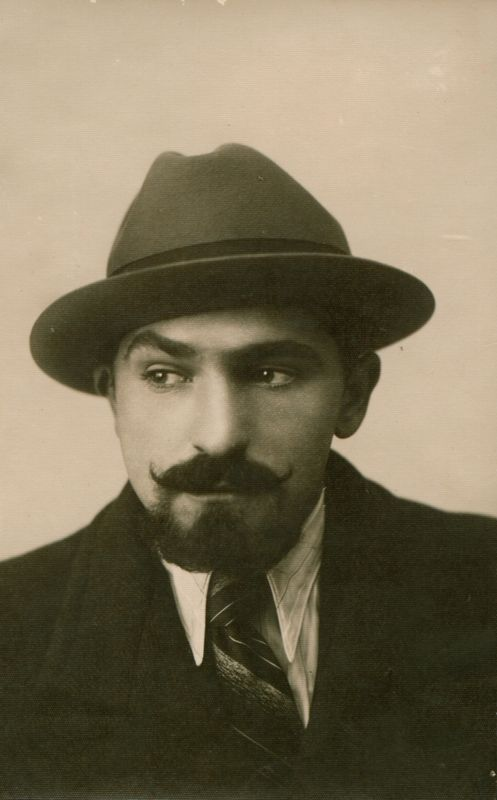
- Katiliškis c. 1939
- Born: Albinas Marius Vaitkus; 15 September 1914; Gruzdžiai, Kovno Governorate, Russian Empire
- Died: 17 December 1980 (aged 66); Lemont, Illinois, U.S.
- Resting place: Lithuanian National Cemetery
- Occupation: Writer
- Spouse: Zinaida Nagytė-Katiliškienė
- Writing career
- Notable works: Miškais ateina ruduo, Išėjusiems negrįžti, Užuovėja

Marius Katiliškis (born Albinas Marius Vaitkus; 15 September 1914 – 17 December 1980) was a Lithuanian writer in exile.

== Biography ==
Katiliškis's parents were from Žagariškiai, on the northern border of Lithuania. The future writer was born in Gruzdžiai, but he spent his childhood and early youth in the village of Katiliškės, a few kilometers away, from which he took his later name. He was the ninth of eleven children.

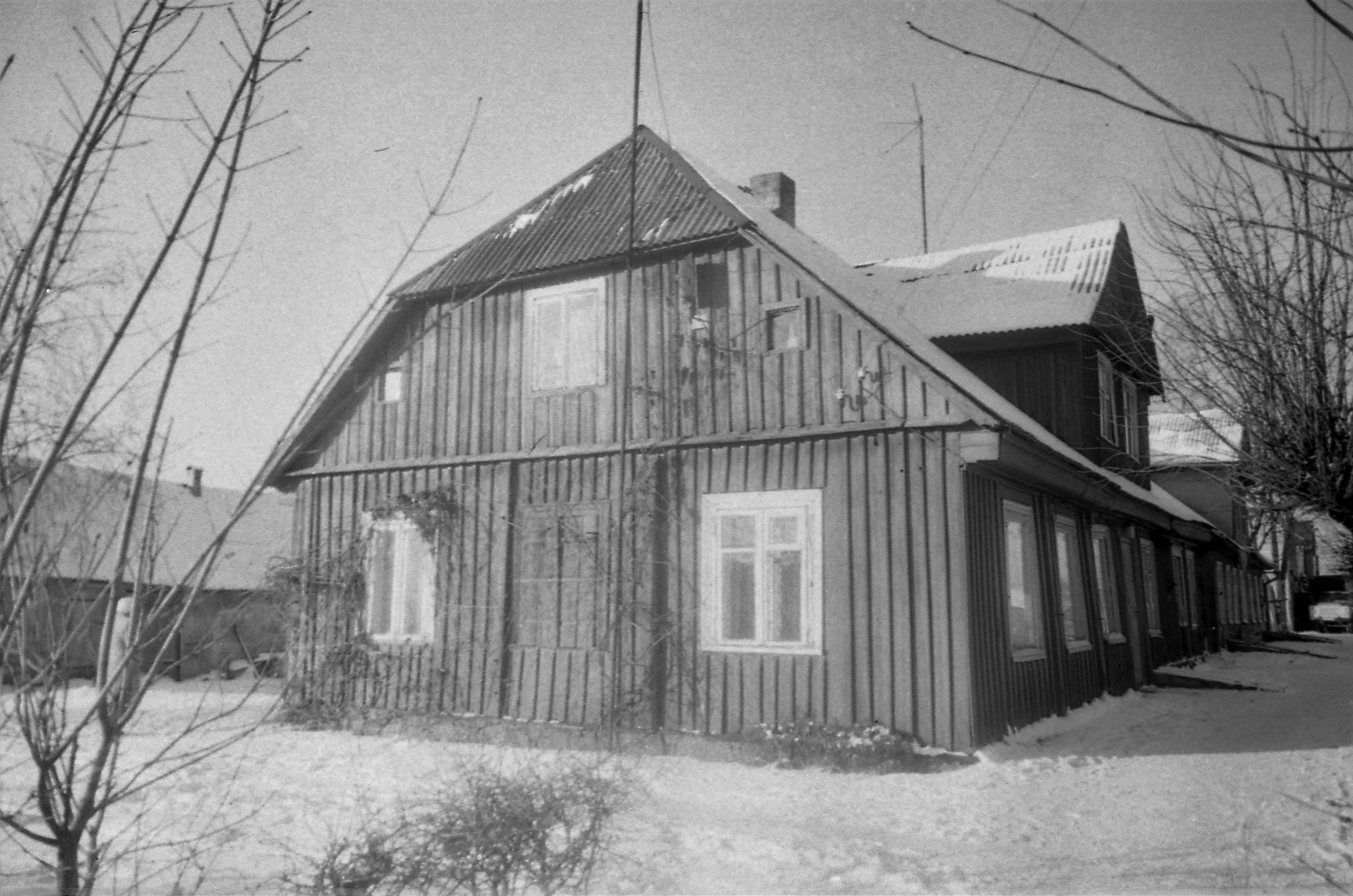
Katiliškis' birthplace (front)

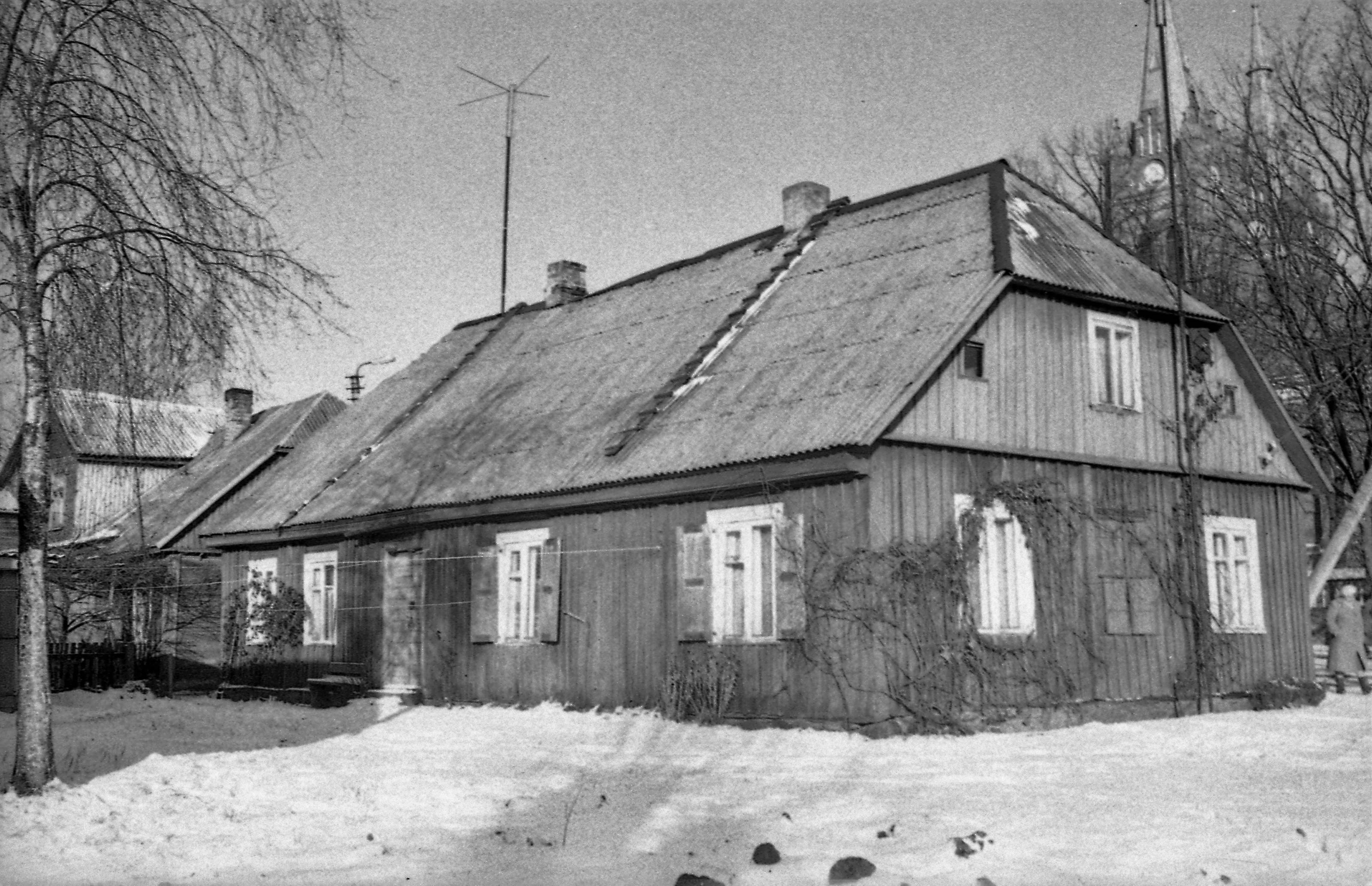
Katiliškis' birthplace (side)

He attended school in Žagarė and worked on his father's farm. In 1931, he was called up for service in the Lithuanian Army as a radio operator. Returning from the army, he found work in the Pasvalys library, which was renamed in his honor in 1994. In 1941, he married the mathematics teacher Elzė Avižonytė.

As the German Army was retreating from the Eastern Front in 1944, Katiliškis joined the short-lived Fatherland Defense Force and fought the Red Army at Seda, Lithuania. Some of his experiences retreating from Lithuania to Germany were the basis for his biographical novel Išėjusiems negrįžti (No return for the departed). In fear of being deported back to the Soviet Union, he changed his name to Marius Katiliškis.

Katiliškis spent time in various displaced persons camps, studying art in Freiburg, a noted cultural center for displaced Lithuanians, where he met and was engaged to the poet Zinaida Nagytė, who wrote under the pen name Liūnė Sutema. In 1949, he emigrated to the United States, living in New York and Chicago. He worked at various factories and menial jobs in the Chicago area, including at the Kimball Piano factory. The writer built his own house on the outskirts of Lemont, Illinois, and lived there until his death in 1980 from complications of various illnesses (heart disease, cirrhosis, bladder cancer, and circulatory problems in the legs so severe that they both became gangrenous and required amputation.)

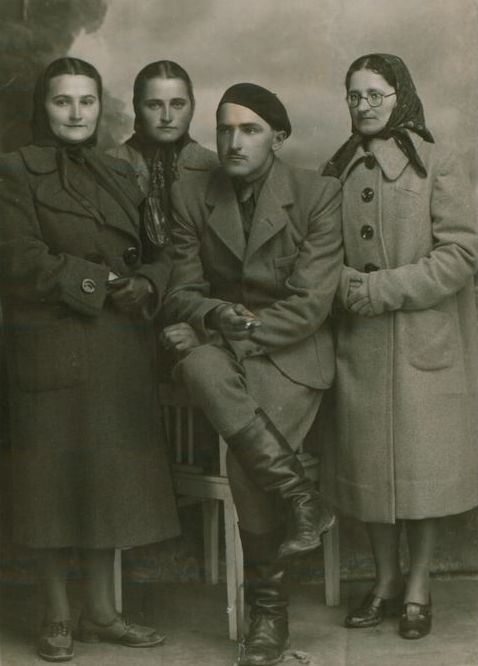
Marius Katiliškis with his sisters, c. 1938

== Works ==
Katiliškis was noted for his interest in language, frequently carrying a notepad and pencil to make notes about words he heard; several scholarly articles have been written on his use of language.

Katiliškis's published his first poems at the age of 17 in 1931 in the Šiauliai weekly Naujienos, and he continued publishing poetry and prose in various Lithuanian publications. A manuscript of a collection of short stories submitted to a publisher was lost during the war and rediscovered and published only in 2003.

Most of his other works were first published in Chicago, although his most famous work, Miškais ateina ruduo (1957), was republished in 1969 in Soviet Lithuania, a rarity among émigré writers. A film based on this book was released in 1990. Some critics consider this work the best prose work written in Lithuanian. Early critics compared the novel to Flemish painting.

Katiliškis's books were honored by a number of prizes from American-Lithuanian organizations, including from the Lithuanian Encyclopedia Press, the Santara-Šviesa federation and the Lithuanian Writer's Society.

== Bibliography ==
- 1948 Prasilenkimo valanda (short stories), Schweinfurt, Germany: Vismantas
- 1951 Paskendusi vasara (story collection), Rodney (Ontario), Canada: Rūta
- 1952 Užuovėja (short stories), Chicago (Illinois): Terra
- 1957 Miškais ateina ruduo (novel), Chicago: Terra
- 1958 Išėjusiems negrįžti (novel), Chicago: Terra
- 1963 Šventadienis už miesto (short stories), Chicago: Terra
- 1969 Duobkasiai, Chicago: Pedagoginis lituanistikos institutas
- 1969 Miškais ateina ruduo (novel), Vilnius: Vaga
- 1975 Apsakymai, Willowbrook: Algimanto Mackaus knygų leidimo fondas
- 1993 Pirmadienis Emerald gatvėje (unfinished novel), Willowbrook, Il.: Algimanto Mackaus knygų leidimo fondas
- 2022 Fall Comes from the Forest (translation of Miškais ateina ruduo by Birutė Vaičjurgis Šležas), Flossmoor, Il.: Pica Pica Press
