= Zeno Coste =

Romanian singer

Zeno Coste (May 30 1907 – 1985) was a Romanian singer.

== Life ==
Zeno Coste was born in Ciacova, Banat, to Iuliu and Zoe Coste.

Before starting his singing career, Zeno was a talented athlete. From 1927 to 1930 he held the Romanian record in double-handed weight throwing.

From 1928 on, he studied music in Berlin and Milan. He was also successful in sports during his studies at the Technische Hochschule in Charlottenburg (now Technische Universität Berlin), winning the university championships in shot put three times. In 1930 he played a singer in the first Romanian sound film, Ciuleandra. In December 1930 he recorded several songs in Romanian for the Columbia label in Berlin. In 1931/32 he sang the Tenor voice with the vocal ensemble "Die Parker", which appeared on a number of records with the orchestras of Bernard Etté, Billy Bartholomew, Ilja Livschakoff and Georg Nettelmann. The group performed in two movies: Melodie der Liebe with Richard Tauber and Die spanische Fliege with Lizzi Waldmueller.

From 1932 to 1935 Zeno Coste was First Tenor with the Kardosch Singers, a successful vocal ensemble in the style of the Comedian Harmonists. The other members were Hungarians István Kardos (piano and arrangements) and Pál Nyiri (Bass) and two Germans, Rudi Schuricke (Second Tenor) and Fritz Angermann (Baritone).

The Kardosch Singers completed tours in Denmark and the Netherlands, had radio appearances in Copenhagen, Hilversum, Frankfurt and Berlin, as well as concerts throughout Germany and a six-month engagement with the Theater am Kurfürstendamm in Berlin. Between 1932 and 1935, they recorded about 80 pieces for Telefunken, Odeon, and the Deutsche Grammophongesellschaft. The ensemble was involved in several film productions in 1932 and 1933, most of which have not survived. In the 1933 film Roman einer Nacht they visibly appear as singers in a ball scene.

In early 1935, the Kardosch singers toured Germany with Barnabas von Géczy and his orchestra, as well as with Willy Reichert and his artists' troupe.

In November 1935 the group made their last records. Kardos and his wife were both of Jewish descent and Nyiri was married to a Jewish woman, so both couples went back to Hungary.

Coste stayed in Germany and had engagements at the Theater des Volkes in Berlin from December 1935 to February 1936. In the summer of 1936 he was signed on with the Meistersextett, one of the two successor groups to the Comedian Harmonists and participated in their recordings between August and October of that year, most notably in "Ich wollt' ich wär ein Huhn". He was also signed on to sing with the Meistersextett for the film Und Du mein Schatz fährst mit in September 1936.

In 1937 he sang in the film La Habanera, and recorded four songs with Erhard Bauschke and his orchestra.

He returned to his native Romania in 1938. In 1942 and 1944 he sang the role of Rodolfo in "La Bohéme" under Antonin Ciolan and that of Alfred Germont in "La Traviata" at the Romanian National Opera in Iași.

He then returned to Banat where he worked as an engineer and was engaged as a solo singer with the Philharmonic Choir and the Cathedral Choir in Timișoara. He died in 1985.

== Family ==
His parents were attorney Iuliu Coste (1876–1967) and his wife Zoe (1885–1980). Iuliu Coste was prefect of Timis-Torontal twice in the 1920s. Zeno had two sisters, Zoe and Hortensia. Brutus Coste was his younger brother.

On 11 November 1935 he married Helene Anna Kryszewska (1910–1979) in Berlin-Wilmersdorf. The former Romanian national volleyball player Mihai Coste is his son.

== Discography ==
=== As a solo singer ===
Berlin, December 11, 1930

Columbia Tanzorchester, vocals Zeno Coste [for Romania]

- WHR 116 Oh Fräulein Grete
- WHR 117 Du hast ja eine Träne im Knopfloch
- WHR 118 Liebe für eine Nacht
- WHR 119 Eine Freundin so goldig wie du
- WHR 120 Pardon Madame!
- WHR 121 Good Night
- WHR 122 Liebling, mein Herz lässt dich grüßen

Berlin, December 12, 1930

Columbia Tanzorchester, vocals Zeno Coste [for Romania]

- WHR 123 So war es in Sanssouci
- WHR 124 Das Lied ist aus (Frag’ nicht warum!)
- WHR 125 Manuela
- WHR 126 Mie Cielito
- WHR 127 Warum hast du so traurige Augen?
- WHR 128 Pourquoi
- WHR 129 Mama … yo quiero un novio

Berlin, December 16, 1930

Columbia Tanzorchester, vocals Zeno Coste [for Romania]

- WHR 117-2 Du hast ja eine Träne im Knopfloch

Berlin, March 1937

Erhard Bauschke and his orchestra, vocals Zeno Costa

Grammophon 2570:

- Zwischen grünen Bergen steht ein kleines Haus
- Wenn die Glocken läuten

Grammophon 10604:

- Ein Edelweiß hast Du zum Abschied mir gegeben
- Barbara

=== With the Kardosch-Singers ===
Discography

=== With The Parkers ===
August 1931: Ilja Livschakoff und sein Orchester, Refrain „Die Parker":

- 4163 BD – Horch! Horch! 1. Teil – Grammophon 24208
- 4164 1/2 BD – Horch! Horch! 2. Teil – Grammophon 24208
- 4173 1/2 BD – Das ist die Liebe der Matrosen – Grammophon 24210

September 1931: Billy Bartholomew und sein Orchester – Refrain „Die Parker":

- C 1528 – Im Salzkammergut, da kann man gut lustig sein – Kristall 3208
- C 1529 – Das ist die Liebe der Matrosen – Kristall 3209, 3224

September/Oktober 1931: Kristall-Orchester, Gesang: Quartett „Die Parker“

- C 1555-1 Volkslieder Potpourri 1. Teil – Kristall 1242
- C 1556-1 Volkslieder Potpourri 2. Teil – Kristall 1242

September oder Oktober 1931: Bernhard Etté und sein Orchester, Refrain „Die Parker“:

- C 1566 – Rosa, reizende Rosa – Kristall 3219
- C 1567 – Schön ist das Leben – Kristall 3218

5. November 1931: Lizzi Waldmüller, „Die Parker“ und Jean Gilbert mit seinem Orchester:

- OD 643-1 – Sag mir mal Schnucki auf spanisch – Electrola EG 2452

November 1931: Ilja-Livschakoff und sein Orchester, Gesang Leo Monosson und „Die Parker“:

- 4136 BR – Für alle 1. Teil – Grammophon 24354
- 4137 1/2 BR – Für alle 2. Teil – Grammophon 24354

Dezember 1931: Kurt Hardt mit Quartett „Die Parker“ mit Orchesterbegleitung:

- C 1601-1 – Es rauscht der Wald 1. Teil – Kristall 6069
- C 1602 – Es rauscht der Wald 2. Teil – Kristall 6069

Januar 1932: Bernhard Etté und sein Orchester, Gesang „Die Parker“:

- C 1625 – Für alle 1. Teil – Kristall 3235
- C 1626 – Für alle 2. Teil – Kristall 3235

Januar 1932: Kristall-Orchester, Gesang „Die Parker“:

- C 1634 – Wir walzen 1. Teil – Kristall 1633
- C 1635 – Wir walzen 2. Teil – Kristall 1633

Januar 1932: George Nettelmann und sein Orchester, Refrain: Kurt Mühlhardt und „Die Parker“:

- C 1647 – Morgen geht’s uns gut – Kristall 3239
- C 1649 – Potpourri aus dem Tonfilm „Bomben auf Monte Carlo“ – Kristall 3240

Frühling oder Sommer 1932: Kristall-Orchester und „Die Parker

- C 2181 Rheinischer Sang 1. Teil – Kristall 7203
- C 2182 Rheinischer Sang 2. Teil – Kristall 7203

=== With the Meistersextett ===
August–September 1936:

ORA 1418 In Mexico - Electrola EG 3723, Electrola EG 3745, HMV AM 4744, HMV EG 3723, HMV EG 3745

ORA 1419 Ich woll' ich wär ein Huhn - Electrola EG 3723, Electrola EG 3743, HVM AM 4744, HMV EG 3723

ORA 1471 Ja, der Ozean ist groß - Electrola EG 3743

ORA 1472 Schreit alle Hurra! - Electrola EG 3745, HMV EG 3745

9. Oktober 1936:

ORA 1504 – Der Piccolino – Electrola EG 3763

ORA 1505 – Hand in Hand – Electrola EG 3763

== Filmography ==
- Ciuleandra
- Melodie der Liebe
- Die Spanische Fliege
- Ja, treu ist die Soldatenliebe
- Grün ist die Heide
- Moderne Mitgift
- Tausend für eine Nacht
- Wovon soll der Schornstein rauchen
- Roman einer Nacht
- Glückliche Reise
- Und du mein Schatz fährst mit
- La Habanera
