= Vaclovas Sidzikauskas =

Lithuanian diplomat

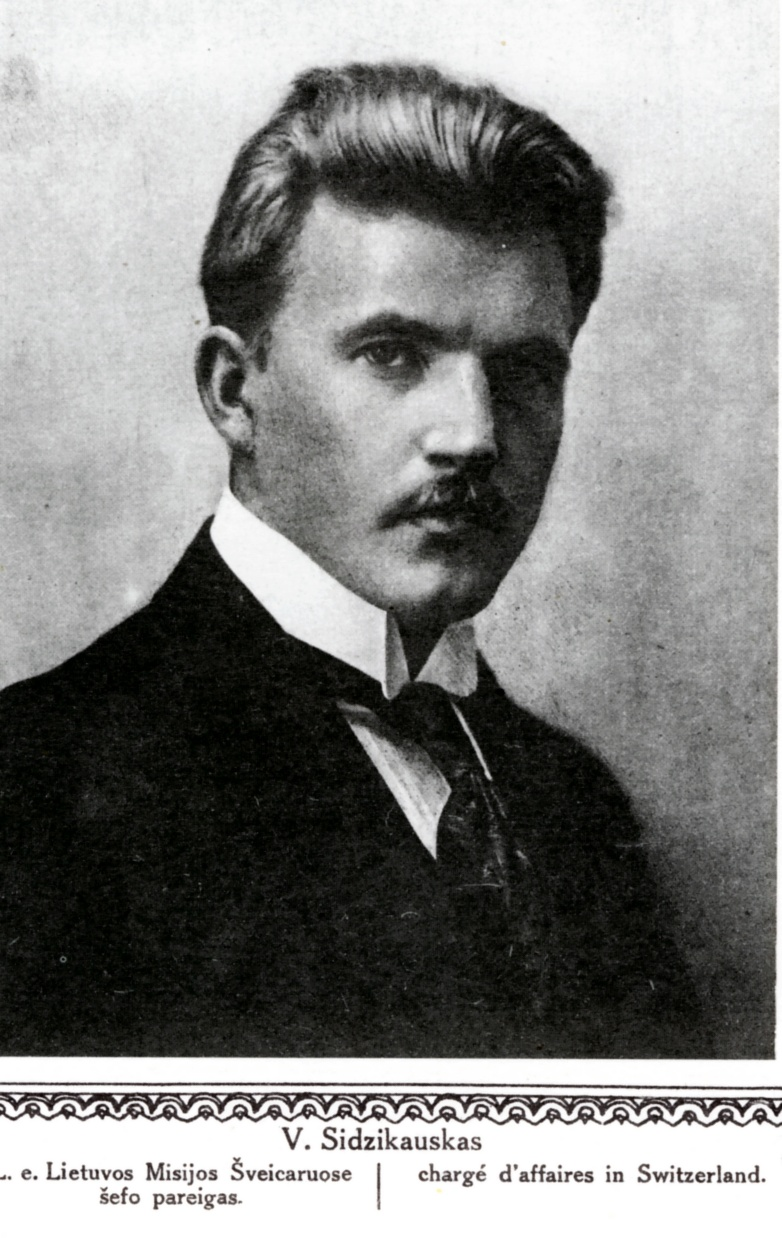
- Portrait of Sidzikauskas from Album of Lithuania published in 1921
- Born: 10 April 1893; Šiaudinė, Suwałki Governorate, Congress Poland
- Died: 2 December 1973 (aged 80); New York, NY
- Resting place: Mount St. Mary Cemetery
- Education: University of Fribourg; Moscow Imperial University; Vytautas Magnus University
- Occupation: Diplomat
- Political party: Farmers' Party
- Board member of: Union of Lithuanian West; Supreme Committee for the Liberation of Lithuania; Committee for a Free Lithuania; Assembly of Captive European Nations
- Spouse(s): Regina-Marijona Seniauskaitė (1893–1961); Birutė, daughter of Kazys Skučas

Vaclovas Sidzikauskas (10 April 1893 – 2 December 1973) was a prominent diplomat in interwar Lithuania and post-war anti-communist.

Educated at the University of Fribourg and Moscow Imperial University, Sidzikauskas joined the newly established Lithuanian Ministry of Justice. In October 1919, he was sent to Switzerland and, after the resignations of Jurgis Šaulys, became the Lithuanian diplomatic representative to Switzerland and a member of several Lithuanian delegations to the League of Nations. Sidzikauskas was transferred as the Lithuanian representative in Berlin in June 1922. The position became a key posting in Lithuanian foreign affairs after the Klaipėda Revolt in January 1923. He was one of the negotiators of the Klaipėda Convention which recognized Klaipėda Region (Memelland) as an autonomous part of Lithuania. When conflicts arose with Germany over the interpretation of the convention, Sidzikauskas negotiated with German officials and represented Lithuania at the League of Nations. Twice, in 1926 and 1931, Sidzikauskas represented Lithuania at the Permanent Court of International Justice. In October 1931, he was transferred to London.

His diplomatic career was cut short by a corruption scandal. Convicted of misappropriation of funds, Sidzikauskas resigned from diplomatic posts in November 1934. He became director of the Lithuanian subsidiary of the Shell Oil Company in 1936 and joined Lithuanian cultural life by contributing articles to Lithuanian press and chairing the Union of Lithuanian West (Lietuvos vakarų sąjunga) which sought to strengthen cultural ties between the Klaipėda Region and Lithuania. After the occupation of Lithuania by the Soviet Union in June 1940, NKVD attempted to recruit Sidzikauskas as an agent. He fled to Nazi Germany where he spent 20 months in the Soldau and Auschwitz concentration camps. He was freed with the help of his old diplomatic contacts. At the end of the war, he joined the Supreme Committee for the Liberation of Lithuania (VLIK) and in 1947 became chairman of its Executive Council which had aspirations of becoming the Lithuanian government-in-exile. These ambitions soured the relationship between VLIK and the Lithuanian Diplomatic Service. In 1950, Sidzikauskas moved to United States and became active in various anti-communist organizations. In 1951, he became chairman of the Committee for a Free Lithuania, an initiative of the National Committee for a Free Europe, and chaired it until his death in 1973. He also briefly chaired the Assembly of Captive European Nations (twice, in 1960–1961 and 1965–1966) and VLIK (1964–1966).

== Early life and education ==
Sidzikauskas was born in Šiaudinė village in Suwałki Governorate in 1893. His younger brother Vladas became lieutenant colonel in the Lithuanian Army. After completion of two-year primary education, he enrolled at the Veiveriai Teachers' Seminary in 1906. Upon graduation in 1911, he went on to study law at the University of Fribourg. However, his studies were cut short when his father died. He had to return to Lithuania and take up teaching to earn a living.

At the start of World War I, Sidzikauskas evacuated to Moscow where he passed exams and enrolled at the Faculty of Natural Sciences of Moscow Imperial University to avoid being conscripted to the Russian Imperial Army. After a year, he transferred to the Faculty of Law. In Moscow, he met other Lithuanians that later became prominent figures in Lithuanian politics, including future Minister of Justice and Internal Affairs Petras Leonas, future Lithuanian envoy to Moscow Jurgis Baltrušaitis, future Minister of Foreign Affairs Juozas Urbšys. Sidzikauskas joined Lithuanian activities. He became secretary of Moscow section of the Lithuanian Society for the Relief of War Sufferers and joined the Democratic National Freedom League (Santara), a moderate liberal political party that sought to find the middle path between the political left and right. The party was later reorganized as the Farmers' Party and was not very successful.

In spring 1918, authorized by the Council of Lithuania, Sidzikauskas organized the evacuation of Lithuanian students and teachers back to Vilnius. The first Lithuanian government was formed only after the Armistice of Compiègne in November 1918. Leonas became Minister of Justice and invited Sidzikauskas to join the newly established ministry. Sidzikauskas agreed and was promoted to director of the Administration Department on 1 February 1919. In March, Sidzikauskas, as a representative of the Democratic National Freedom League, was a member of a six-men commission that negotiated the formation of the coalition Cabinet of Prime Minister Mykolas Sleževičius. Due to lack of personnel, he was also acting director of the Civil and Criminal Law and the Prisons Department. In this capacity he had to deal with communist prison riots and to arrange prisoner exchange with the Lithuanian Soviet Socialist Republic. On 24 July, he personally traveled to Daugailiai on the Lithuanian–Soviet front to exchange 15 prominent Lithuanians, including Mečislovas Reinys, Liudas Gira, Felicija Bortkevičienė, Antanas Tumėnas, for 35 communists.

== Diplomatic career ==
=== Diplomatic representative: Bern, Berlin, London ===
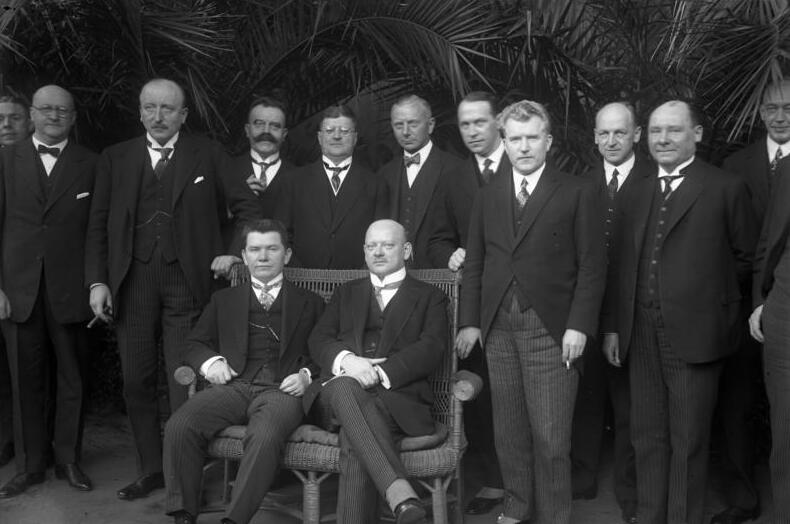
Augustinas Voldemaras (right) sits down with Gustav Stresemann in January 1928. Sidzikauskas stands right by Stresemann.

In October 1919, Sidzikauskas returned to Switzerland in hopes of completing his studies at the University of Fribourg while working at the Lithuanian mission in Switzerland. He became the first secretary to Jurgis Šaulys. However, just five weeks later, Šaulys resigned due to a conflict with Prime Minister Augustinas Voldemaras over four Lithuanian organizations that were closed. Thus young and inexperienced Sidzikauskas became the Lithuanian representative in Switzerland on 6 December 1919. On 12 December Sidzikauskas visited Swiss Federal Department of Foreign Affairs regarding the recognition of Lithuanian passports. The next day, he received a response that the existing status quo was equivalent to Swiss recognition of Lithuania de facto. In May 1920, after the first session of the Constituent Assembly of Lithuania, Sidzikauskas visited Giuseppe Motta regarding de facto recognition of Lithuania which was granted on July 19 along with a promise to support Lithuania's membership in the League of Nations. Switzerland became one of the first countries to recognize Lithuania de jure. Lithuania became a full member of the League of Nations on 21 September 1921.

In 1922, Sidzikauskas inspected Lithuanian consulates in Constantinople, Sofia, and Bucharest and audited their practices of issuing Lithuanian passports and visas. He found instances of major corruption as only a small percentage of passports were issued according to regulations. The consulates were closed a result. After his return from the Genoa Conference, Sidzikauskas was transferred to Berlin from 1 June 1922. The Lithuanian mission in Switzerland was closed in January 1923.

Berlin soon became a key position in Lithuanian foreign affairs, particularly after January 1923 when Lithuania organized the Klaipėda Revolt and took over the Klaipėda Region (Memel Territory) which was detached from Germany by the Treaty of Versailles. Sidzikauskas became heavily involved with negotiating Klaipėda's status and maintaining good relations with Germany which was the largest trading partner of Lithuania and its key supporter against Poland. While residing in Berlin, starting in April 1924, Sidzikauskas also represented Lithuania in the Kingdom of Hungary and the Austrian Republic. Sidzikauskas supported the December 1926 coup by Lithuanian military and helped to convince President Kazys Grinius to resign in favor of Antanas Smetona. He also took care to observe constitutional formalities so that not to jeopardize Lithuania's international recognition. In early 1927, it was decided to close the Lithuanian delegation at the League of Nations and to replace Dovas Zaunius with Sidzikauskas as the Lithuanian non-resident envoy to Switzerland. In 1927–1928, Sidzikauskas led negotiations of the German–Lithuanian Trade Treaty which allowed Lithuanian farmers to export meat. Germany became the dominant trade partner, and Lithuanian exports to Germany grew from 127 million litas in 1927 to 200 million in 1930.

In early 1931, Minister of Foreign Affairs Dovas Zaunius devised a plan to replace some of the long-term Lithuanian representatives. Petras Klimas was to be transferred from Paris to Berlin, Sidzikauskas from Berlin to London, Kazys Bizauskas from London to Moscow, and Jurgis Baltrušaitis from Moscow to Paris. However, only Sidzikauskas was moved, on 1 October 1931, as Bizauskas was recalled to Kaunas. At the same time, he represented Lithuania in The Hague, Netherlands. Sidzikauskas defended Lithuania in two cases brought before the Permanent Court of International Justice. He also helped the Lithuanian government to open economic negotiations with the United Kingdom, when, as a result of the Great Depression, United Kingdom established import quotas for bacon, one of the key exports of Lithuania, in November 1932. He was removed from London in January 1934. After a corruption scandal, Sidzikauskas fully retired from diplomatic life in November 1934.

=== International negotiator: between Poland and Germany ===
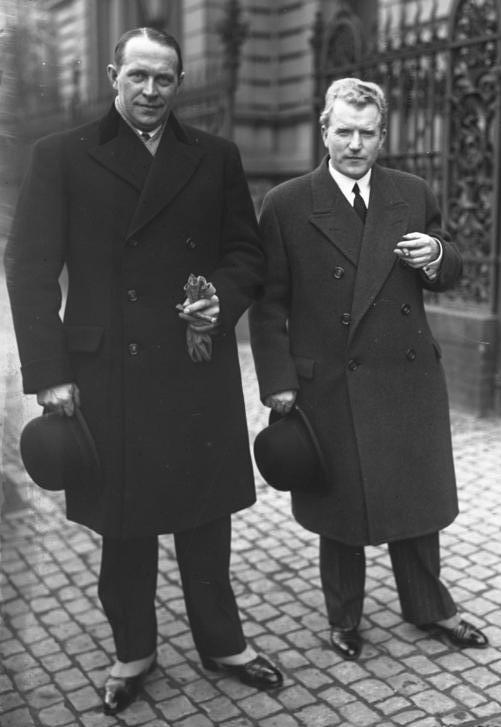
Sidzikauskas (right) with Dovas Zaunius in February 1932

Early on, Sidzikauskas became involved in various proceedings of the League of Nations. As a representative of Lithuania, he signed such international agreements as the Barcelona Convention and Statute on Freedom of Transit of 1921 and the Slavery Convention of 1926. In April 1921, Sidzikauskas became a member of the Lithuanian delegation, led by Ernestas Galvanauskas, to negotiate with the Second Polish Republic regarding Vilnius Region which Poland captured as a result of the Żeligowski's Mutiny in October 1920. The negotiation was mediated by Paul Hymans whose plan was to transfer Vilnius to Lithuania if it agreed to join a federation with Poland. Lithuanian public vehemently opposed such plans and Galvanauskas even survived an assassination attempt. After the Klaipėda Revolt in January 1923, Sidzikauskas became one of the negotiators of the Klaipėda Convention which was concluded in May 1924.

In March 1926, several members of the Parliament of the Klaipėda Region appealed to the League Nations complaining about the shares of taxes the region had to pay the central government. The Lithuanian delegation, led by Sidzikauskas, argued that, according to the Klaipėda Convention, the parliament had no rights to submit the complain (it could be done only by a member of the Council of the League of Nations). In September, the issue was referred to the Commission of Jurists which agreed with the Lithuanian position, but also ruled that any member of the Council of the League of Nations could accept local complaints and then forward them to the League. While Sidzikauskas thought it was a diplomatic victory, diplomats in Kaunas viewed it as a long-term problem as Germany, now the fifth permanent member of the council, could – and indeed was going to – use this ruling to accept various local complains and thus exert pressure on Lithuania. Sidzikauskas reserved the right of the Lithuanian government to decide the rights of Lithuanian citizens to petition foreign governments or international organizations, but did not protest the ruling. He could have argued that the right to petition the League of Nations was given to local inhabitants only in Article 11 of the Convention dealing with the protection of ethnic minorities.

On 15 September 1930, only a day after the Reichstag elections, members of the Parliament of the Klaipėda Region submitted another complaint against Lithuania. This time they complained about Lithuania's interference in the local elections, such as press censorship, restrictions on freedom of assembly, promoting pro-Lithuanian bias within the electoral commission. Sidzikauskas worked intensely negotiating directly with Germany in hopes that the complaint would be withdrawn. Lithuanians relented to many German demands, including appointment of all-German Directorate of the Klaipėda Region and less interference in the October 1930 local elections. German Minister of Foreign affairs Julius Curtius kept pressuring Lithuanians to recall Klaipėda governor Antanas Merkys. Sidzikauskas failed to resolve the conflict via direct negotiations and the complaint was discussed in the January 1931 session of the League of Nations. The session was inconclusive and the issue was postponed.

The Klaipėda Convention guaranteed freedom of transit in the port of Klaipėda, which a concern for Poland due to the profitable timber export via the Neman River. Sidzikauskas was the lead negotiators with the Polish delegation led by Leon Wasilewski on the issue in Copenhagen in September 1925. Prime Minister Vytautas Petrulis was in favor of using the opportunity to normalize the relations with Poland, but intense internal opposition led to the collapse of the negotiations and resignation of Petrulis. When further negotiations between Poland and Lithuania collapsed, the League of Nations referred the case to the Permanent Court of International Justice in January 1931. It specifically concerned reopening of a section of the Libau–Romny Railway between Lentvaris (on the Polish side) and Kaišiadorys (on the Lithuanian side). Sidzikauskas defended the Lithuanian position and in October 1931 the court issued a unanimous advisory opinion that an obligation to negotiate did not imply an obligation to reach an agreement and thus Lithuania could not be forced to reopen the railway. It was the last time that the League actively attempted to mediate or resolve the Polish–Lithuanian conflict.

Another case was submitted to the Permanent Court of International Justice in April 1932. It concerned the dismissal of Otto Böttcher, President of the Directorate of the Klaipėda Region, and dissolution of the Parliament of the Klaipėda Region by Governor Antanas Merkys in February–March 1932. The case was defended by Sidzikauskas and jurist Jacob Robinson. In August 1932, the Court ruled that Lithuania had the right to dismiss Böttcher, but did not have the right to dissolve the parliament. Lithuanians celebrated the ruling as a great victory as the court established the underlying principle that issues not expressively named in the Klaipėda Convention as the jurisdiction of local authorities fell under the jurisdiction of the central government.

== Post diplomatic career and World War II ==
Sidzikauskas retired from diplomatic life in November 1934. He was accused of stealing 88,000 Reichsmarks that three German consuls donated for charitable causes between early 1926 and spring 1929. The allegations surfaced as early as 1932. The case was driven by Jurgis Šaulys, who had replaced Sidzikauskas as the Lithuanian envoy in Berlin. In October 1934, Kaunas district court found Sidzikauskas guilty and sentenced him to six months in prison that was replaced by a three-year parole. He appealed the decision and was found not guilty in May 1935. Despite the acquittal and Sidzikauskas' claims that it was a German provocation and revenge for his work in defending Lithuania's interests in Klaipėda, his reputation was ruined.

Sidzikauskas completed his law studies at the Vytautas Magnus University in 1935 and became director of the Lithuanian subsidiary of the Shell Oil Company in 1936. At the same time he joined various cultural activities. He contributed articles to Teisininkų žinios, Naujoji Romuva, Lietuvos ūkis, and was editor of Revue Baltique that was published jointly with Latvians and Estonians. He became chairman of the Union of Lithuanian West (Lietuvos vakarų sąjunga) which sought to strengthen cultural ties between the Klaipėda Region and Lithuania. He also taught history of diplomacy at the Trade Institute in Klaipėda.

When Lithuania was presented the Soviet ultimatum on June 14, 1940, Sidzikauskas was in Tallinn but returned to Kaunas. The Soviets occupied Lithuania and nationalized all private enterprises, including Shell. Sidzikauskas obtained a job at Lietūkis. In December 1940, he was approached by Soviet NKVD. His personnel file was started under code name Intiligent in April 1940. However, Sidzikauskas refused to cooperate and, fearing an arrest, fled to Nazi Germany in February 1941. There he was arrested for his anti-German activities in the Klaipėda Region and sent to the Soldau concentration camp. By order of Reinhard Heydrich he was sent to the Auschwitz concentration camp as inmate number 24477. Sidzikauskas worked at an administrative office and managed to get his old diplomatic contacts to obtain a release from Heinrich Himmler in December 1942, after 20 months of imprisonment. He was allowed to live under police supervision in Berlin. He was sheltered by a Lithuanian organization on Kantstraße.

== Post-war anti-communist activities ==
=== VLIK and attempts at government-in-exile ===
Towards the end of the war, in October 1944, Sidzikauskas joined the Supreme Committee for the Liberation of Lithuania (VLIK) and became chairman of its foreign branch. In March 1945, VLIK evacuated to Würzburg and later to Reutlingen and attempted to assert its authority over the Lithuanian Diplomatic Service, i.e. Lithuanian diplomats who continued to represent the pre-war Republic of Lithuania in those countries that did not recognize the Soviet occupation. VLIK asserted that the Diplomatic Service was its subordinate in its April 1945 memorandum to American General Dwight D. Eisenhower that was co-authored by Sidzikauskas. Such unilateral declaration set off a decade-long conflict between VLIK and the Diplomatic Service.

The parties met in July 1946 in Bern and agreed to form an Executive Council under VLIK, an embryo which they hoped could develop into a recognized government-in-exile. Its intended chairman Ernestas Galvanauskas departed to Madagascar and was replaced by Sidzikauskas, but he was unpopular with the diplomats. In his role as chairman, the press characterized Sidzikauskas as the prime minister of the Lithuanian government in exile. In March 1947, Sidzikauskas sent a letter to Adam Tarnowski, Minister of Foreign Affairs in the Polish government-in-exile, and signed it as acting Minister of Foreign Affairs. The diplomats protested as the letter was sent without their knowledge or approval. Sidzikauskas believed that a new war between the Western powers and Soviet Union was inevitable and that a Lithuanian government-in-exile was necessary to represent the Lithuanian interests. Stasys Lozoraitis, chief of the diplomats, did not believe the war was inevitable and was cautious not to jeopardize the fragile recognition of the diplomats by subordinating them to VLIK which had no official recognition abroad. Despite further attempts at negotiations, the relationship between VLIK and the Diplomatic Service remained strained. At the same time, parties inside VLIK were growing dissatisfied with the dominating position of the Lithuanian Christian Democratic Party. It forced internal reforms in August 1949 and Sidzikauskas temporarily resigned from the Executive Council. He chaired the council until early 1951.

VLIK and Sidzikauskas continued to represent Lithuanian. In August 1948, Sidzikauskas met with Mikola Abramchyk, chairman of the Rada of the Belarusian Democratic Republic. In December 1948, he also met with Isaak Mazepa and Stepan Vytvytskyi, representatives of the Ukrainian People's Republic. In early 1949, Sidzikauskas and Mykolas Krupavičius, chairman of VLIK, toured Lithuanian communities in the United States for more than three months. In February, they had a meeting with John D. Hickerson, Director of the Office of European Affairs of the United States Department of State, who reiterated U.S. policy of non-recognition of the Soviet occupation. In August 1949, Sidzikauskas became chairman of the Lithuanian National Council (Lietuvos tautinė taryba) which joined the European Movement International in January 1950. In February 1950, Sidzikauskas and Juozas Ambrazevičius visited the Budestag of West Germany. In June 1950, Sidzikauskas, Krupavičius, and Ambrazevičius gained an audience with Pope Pius XII.

=== Committee for a Free Lithuania ===
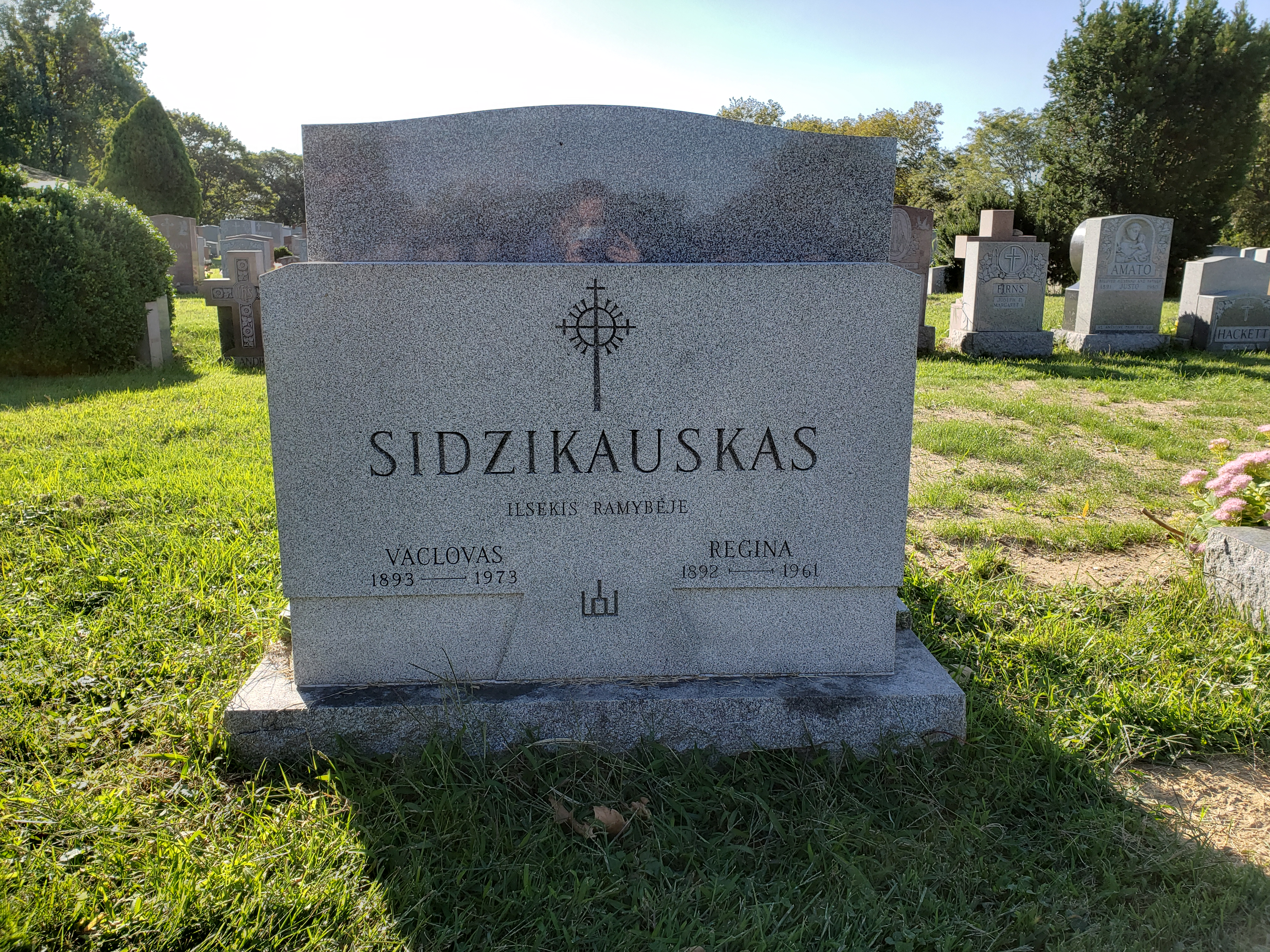
Tomb of Sidzikauskas in Queens, NY

Sidzikauskas moved to United States in July 1950 and settled in New York. The National Committee for a Free Europe, which had ties with the Central Intelligence Agency, approached Povilas Žadeikis, Lithuanian envoy in Washington D.C., about creating a Lithuanian committee. In February 1951, Žadeikis proposed seven men for the Lithuanian Consultative Panel (renamed to the Committee for a Free Lithuania in October 1952). The membership was approved in May 1951 and Sidzikauskas was its chairman until his death. The committee joined the Assembly of Captive European Nations (ACEN) when it was established in 1954. Sidzikauskas became involved with ACEN becoming its chairman in 1960–1961 and 1965–1966 and deputy chairman in 1959–1960 and 1971–1972. He also chaired the first congress of the Lithuanian World Community in August 1958 and was elected as VLIK chairman in November 1964 – December 1966.

The Committee for a Free Lithuania supplied data, documents, and witnesses to the Kersten Committee, advocated for Lithuanian-language broadcasts on Radio Free Europe, and joined Latvian and Estonian committees to establish the Baltic Freedom House and publish Baltic Review in English, French, and Spanish. ACEN and the Committee for a Free Lithuania wrote numerous memorandums and protest notes to world leaders reminding of the Soviet occupation. For example, in May 1955, on the 37th anniversary of the Constituent Assembly of Lithuania, 21 former members of the assembly issued a memorandum to parliament members of United States, Canada, and Great Britain; representatives of the Baltic states issued a manifesto on the 20th anniversary of the Soviet occupation in June 1960 (in response, the Parliamentary Assembly of the Council of Europe adopted a resolution condemning the occupation in September 1960); ACEN held a meeting with the International League for the Rights of Man which issued a report condemning the Soviet regime as it violated human rights in 1962. They also organized protests on historically important dates or when, for example, Nikita Khrushchev visited United States in 1959. All of these actions kept the issue of Lithuania's independence on the political agenda despite the general fatigue and increasing acceptance of the status quo in Eastern Europe.

== Bibliography ==
- Banionis, Juozas (2010). Lietuvos laisvinimas Vakaruose 1940–1975 m. (in Lithuanian). Lietuvos gyventojų genocido ir rezistencijos tyrimo centras. ISBN 978-609-8037-03-6.
- Jonušauskas, Laurynas (2003). Likimo vedami: Lietuvos diplomatinės tarnybos egzilyje veikla 1940–1991 (in Lithuanian). Vilnius: Lietuvos gyventojų genocido ir rezistencijos tyrimo centras. ISBN 9986-757-56-8.
- Žalys, Vytautas (2007). Lietuvos diplomatijos istorija (1925–1940) (in Lithuanian). Vol. I. Vilnius: Versus aureus. ISBN 978-9955-699-50-7.
- Žalys, Vytautas (2012). Lietuvos diplomatijos istorija (1925–1940) (PDF) (in Lithuanian). Vol. II, part I. Vilnius: Edukologija. ISBN 978-9955-20-801-3. Archived from the original (PDF) on 11 February 2018.
- Žalys, Vytautas (2012). Lietuvos diplomatijos istorija (1925–1940) (PDF) (in Lithuanian). Vol. II, part II. Vilnius: Edukologija. ISBN 978-9955-20-802-0.
