= Gruzdžiai =

- Town
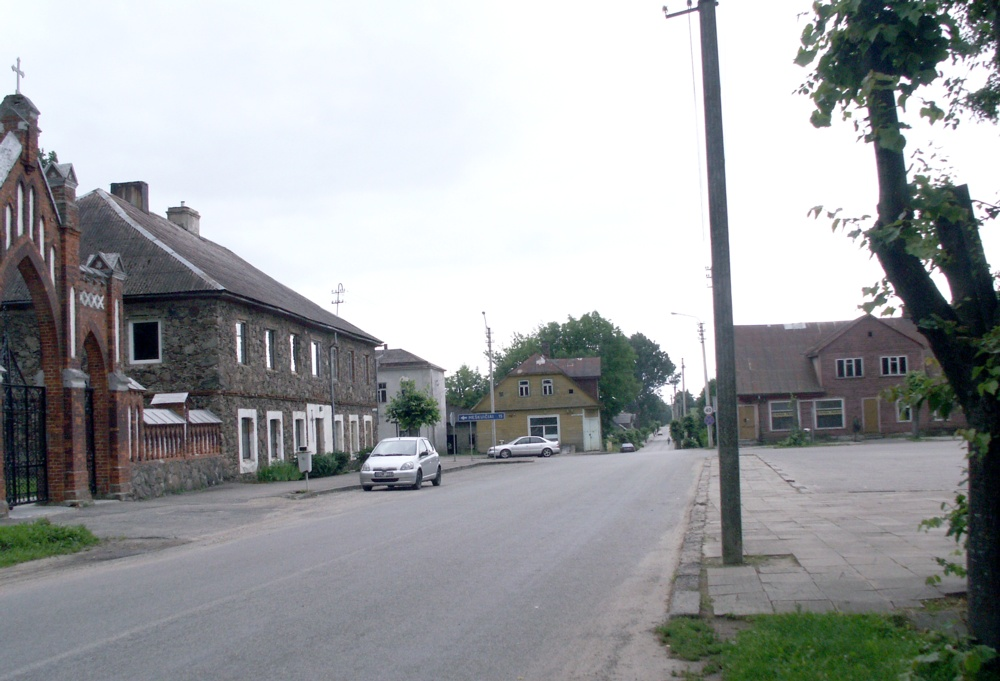

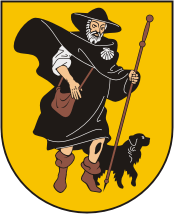
- Coat of arms

- Location in Lithuania
- Coordinates: 56°06′0″N 23°15′10″E
- Country: Lithuania
- Ethnographic region: Samogitia
- County: Šiauliai County

Population (2011)
  - Total: 1,467
- Time zone: UTC+2 (EET)
  - Summer (DST): UTC+3 (EEST)

Gruzdžiai is a town in Šiauliai County in northern-central Lithuania. In 2011 it had a population of 1,467.

The town has a post office (ZIP code: 81024) and a gymnasium. Gruzdžiai was the birthplace of Lithuanian exile novelist Marius Katiliškis.
