= Supreme Committee for the Liberation of Lithuania =

The Supreme Committee for the Liberation of Lithuania or VLIK (Lithuanian: Vyriausiasis Lietuvos išlaisvinimo komitetas) was an organization seeking independence of Lithuania. It was established on November 25, 1943, during the Nazi occupation. After World War II, it moved abroad and continued its operations in Germany and the United States. VLIK claimed to be the legal representative of the Lithuanian parliament and government, but it did not enjoy international recognition. It was dissolved in 1990, when Lithuania re-established its independence.

Flag of Lithuania from 1918 to 1940

== In Lithuania ==
When Nazi Germany invaded the Soviet Union in June 1941, many Lithuanians greeted Germans as liberators from the oppressive Soviet regime. However, attitudes changed and various resistance movements began to form at the end of 1941 and beginning of 1942. During 1942 and 1943, these movements began consolidating into the pro-Catholic Nation's Council (Lithuanian: Tautos taryba) and Supreme Committee of the Lithuanians (Lithuanian: Vyriausiasis lietuvių komitetas). After a five-month discussion, these two organizations unified into VLIK, representing a wide range of political views. The first meeting of VLIK was held on November 25 1943 in Kaunas, and Steponas Kairys was elected its first chairman. VLIK's mission was to act as an underground government until the restoration of the Lithuanian independence. VLIK sent envoys to Sweden and Finland, maintained contacts with Lithuanian diplomats in Switzerland, and attempted to inform the western powers of the crimes perpetrated by the Nazis. VLIK published underground newspapers and agitated for passive resistance against the Nazis. They thought that their biggest enemy was still the Soviet Union and that resources should be conserved for the upcoming armed resistance against the Russians.

In early 1944, VLIK sent colonel Kazimieras Ambraziejus on a mission to Stockholm, but he was captured and interrogated by the Gestapo in Estonia. This led to arrests of eight VLIK members on April 29–30, 1944. In 1944, when the Soviets pushed the Germans from the Baltic states during the Baltic Offensive, most VLIK members retreated to Germany and VLIK ceased its functions in Lithuania. VLIK originally designated three of its members to remain in Lithuania, but only one did. It was a strategic loss as communication with Lithuania was severed and there was very little contact with the remaining resistance groups.

== In exile ==
The functions of VLIK were resumed in October 1944 in Würzburg, but soon moved to Reutlingen ahead of the approaching Red Army. VLIK remained in Reutlingen until 1955. Mykolas Krupavičius became the new chairman. VLIK united 15 different political organizations, whose members held a variety of political views and that hindered decision making. In July 1945, before the Potsdam Conference, VLIK sent memorandums to Winston Churchill and Harry S. Truman asking not to recognize Lithuania's occupation by the Soviet Union and asking for help reestablishing independent Lithuania. Numerous further notes were sent to the United Nations, various diplomats, academics, and journalists, promoting their cause and reporting human right violations in Lithuania. VLIK also reestablished ELTA news service, including radio broadcasts. VLIK attempted to establish contacts with the armed resistance in Lithuania, but only had limited communication with Juozas Lukša.

VLIK positioned itself as the Lithuanian Seimas (the parliament) and claimed that its executives were equivalent of a cabinet. Despite its claims, VLIK was not recognized by any foreign country as a representative of Lithuania. It further claimed that Lithuanian diplomats, still active in pre-war embassies of independent Lithuania, were subordinates to VLIK. This caused decade-long disagreements with Stasys Lozoraitis, who was in charge of the diplomatic service and had a back-dated appointment as prime minister by the last president of Lithuania Antanas Smetona. This tension was one of the reasons why the Lithuanians were unable to form a recognized government-in-exile. Several attempts were made to ease the tension between VLIK (representing the nation) and the diplomatic service (representing the state). The first was a conference in Bern in July 1946. It was decided that they would form an Executive Council, but it never took off. The second conference was held in Paris in August 1947.

As war refugees moved out of the displaced persons camps to the United States, VLIK also moved its headquarters to New York City in 1955. After the move, VLIK's political agenda became less prominent. The activists realized that there will be no quick solution to the Cold War. VLIK's main goal was to maintain non-recognition of Lithuania's occupation and dissemination of information from behind the Iron Curtain. VLIK established the Lithuanian World Community with a mission of promoting Lithuanian language and culture among Lithuanians living abroad. Eventually, VLIK ceased to exist after Lithuania declared independence in 1990.

== Chairmen ==
VLIK's chairmen were:

- Steponas Kairys (25 November 1943 – 15 June 1945)
- Mykolas Krupavičius (15 June 1945 – 27 November 1955)
- Jonas Matulionis (27 November 1955 – 1 June 1957)
- Antanas Trimakas (1 June 1957 – 27 February 1964)
- Juozas Audėnas (27 February 1964 – 3 October 1964)
- Kipras Bielinis (3 October 1964 – 29 November 1964)
- Vaclovas Sidzikauskas (29 November 1964 – 11 December 1966)
- Juozas Kęstutis Valiūnas (11 December 1966 – 24 March 1979)
- Kazys Bobelis (24 March 1979 – 31 May 1992)

== See also ==
- National Committee of the Republic of Estonia
- National Committee for a Free Germany
- Committee for the Liberation of the Peoples of Russia
- Free Albania National Committee
- Ukrainian Supreme Liberation Council
