= Assembly of Captive European Nations =

Anti-communist group of representatives from Soviet-dominated nations

- Formation: September 20, 1954
- Dissolved: 1972
- Headquarters: New York City, USA

Assembly of Captive European Nations or ACEN was an organization founded on September 20, 1954, as a coalition of representatives from nine nations in Central and Eastern Europe under Soviet domination after World War II. Former political and cultural leaders from Albania, Bulgaria, Czechoslovakia, Estonia, Hungary, Latvia, Lithuania, Poland and Romania were members of the organization. Its main office was in New York, with branch offices in Bonn, London and Paris. Representatives from post-1948 SFR Yugoslavia were not allowed to join the organization as the country was an important western partner in the Balkans region.

== History ==
The goals of the ACEN were, in their own words:

to provide liberation from communist dictatorship by peaceful means, to educate public opinion on the actual situation behind the Iron Curtain, and to enlist the cooperation and assistance of governmental and non-governmental institutions.

Funding was provided by the Free Europe Committee. When that organization suspended financial assistance to ACEN in January 1972 because of its own budget reductions, the offices of ACEN were closed and publication activities came to a halt. During its lifetime the organization published pamphlets and periodicals in English, as well as some of the members' own languages. It also sponsored symposia and exhibitions, in particular it promoted the commemoration of Captive Nations Week. It provided background information to members of the United States Congress regarding the political and economic situations in their homelands situated behind the Iron Curtain.

The records of the ACEN and its member organizations are preserved in the Immigration History Research Center Archives, University of Minnesota Libraries.

== Chairmen ==
ACEN chairmen were:

- Vilis Māsēns (Latvia): 1954–1958
- Stefan Korboński (Poland): 1958–1959
- Petr Zenkl (Czechoslovakia): 1959–1960
- Vaclovas Sidzikauskas (Lithuania) 1960–1961
- Ferenc Nagy (Hungary): 1961–62
- Georgi Dimitrov (Bulgaria): 1962–1963
- Alexander Kütt (Estonia): 1963–1964
- Vasil Gërmenji (Albania): 1964–1965
- Vaclovas Sidzikauskas: 1965–1966
- Stefan Korboński: 1966–1967
- Georgi Dimitrov 1967–1968
- Jozef Lettrich (Czechoslovakia): 1968–1969
- Alfreds Bērziņš (Latvia): 1969–1970
- Vasil Gërmenji: 1970–1971
- Stefan Korboński: 1971–1972

== Archival collections ==
- Assembly of Captive European Nations records, Immigration History Research Center Archives, University of Minnesota Libraries

== See also ==
- Socialist Union of Central-Eastern Europe, a partner organisation founded in 1949

== Bibliography ==
- Feliks Gadomski (ACEN Secretary General), Zgromadzenie Europejskich Narodów Ujarzmionych. Krótki Zarys (New York: Bicentennial Publishing, 1995).
- Andrzej Nowak, "Polityka ujarzmionych", Arcana 1997, no 5, 154.
- Piotr Stanek, "Powstanie i działalność Zgromadzenia Europejskich Narodów Zjednoczonych (ACEN) w świetle Archiwum Feliksa Gadomskiego", in: Prace uczestników studium doktoranckiego. Historia, red. A. Filipczak-Kocur, Opole 2007, 69–99.
- Anna Mazurkiewicz, "Assembly of Captive European Nations: 'The Voice of the Silenced Peoples'" in: Anti-Communist Minorities: The Political Activism of Ethnic Refugees in the United States, red. Ieva Zake, New York: Palgrave Macmillan 2009, 167–185.
- Anna Mazurkiewicz, "'Niejawna ingerencja rządu w swobodną wymianę poglądów' – Zgromadzenie Europejskich Narodów Ujarzmionych w zimnowojennej polityce USA" in: Tajny oręż czy ofiary zimnej wojny? Emigracje polityczne z Europy Środkowej i Wschodniej, red. S. Łukasiewicz, Lublin, Warszawa 2010, 255–263.
- Anna Mazurkiewicz, "Assembly of Captive European Nations" in: The Polish American Encyclopedia, red. James S. Pula, (Jefferson, NC: McFarland & Co. Inc. 2011), s. 20–21.
- Anna Mazurkiewicz, The Schism within the Polish Delegation to the Assembly of Captive European Nations 1954-1972 in: The Polish Diaspora in America and the Wider World, red. Adam Walaszek, Janusz Pezda, (Kraków: Polish Academy of Arts and Sciences, 2012), p. 73-110. Updated version was published in the U.S.: The Schism within the Polish Delegation to the Assembly of Captive European Nations 1954–1972, in: The Inauguration of “Organized Political Warfare”...
- Pauli Heikkila, "Estonians and the Stockholm Office of the Assembly of Captive European Nations" in: East Central Europe in Exile. Transatlantic Identities, red. Anna Mazurkiewicz (Newcastle upon Tyne: Cambridge Scholars Publishing, 2013), p. 247-264.
- Anna Mazurkiewicz, “’The Little U.N.’ at 769 First Avenue, New York (1956–1963),” in: East Central Europe in Exile. Transatlantic Identities, red. Anna Mazurkiewicz (Newcastle upon Tyne: Cambridge Scholars Publishing, 2013), p. 227-245.
- Anna Mazurkiewicz, "Relationship between the Assembly of Captive European Nations and the Free Europe Committee in 1950-1960" in: The Inauguration of "Organized Political Warfare" - The Cold War Organizations Sponsored by the National Committee for a Free Europe / Free Europe Committee, red. Katalin Kadar Lynn (Saint Helena, CA: Helena History Press, distr. CEU Press: Budapest-New York, 2013), 91-130.
- Anna Mazurkiewicz, "'Join, or Die'—The Road to Cooperation Among East European Exiled Political Leaders in the United States, 1949-1954", Polish American Studies 69, no. 2 (2012): 5-43.
- Anna Mazurkiewicz, „Narody ujarzmione” – lobby polityczne czy projekt propagandowy?", Studia Historica Gedanensia 5 (Gdańsk: Wydawnictwo Uniwersytetu Gdańskiego, 2014).
