= Lithuanian World Community =

Organization for the Lithuanian diaspora

The Lithuanian World Community (LWC) (Note: Lithuanian: Pasaulio lietuvių bendruomenė PLB)) is a non-governmental and non-profit organization established in 1949 that unifies Lithuanian communities abroad. The Constitution of the Lithuanian World Community declares that it consists of all Lithuanians living abroad. The Community is active in 42 countries, including representation in Lithuania.

== History ==
On February 7, 1932, a fund to support Lithuanians in foreign countries was established in Lithuania, making one of the first attempts to maintain closer ties between the Lithuanian diaspora and Lithuania. Three years later the first Lithuanian World Congress was held in Kaunas, which established the Lithuanian World Union. The mission of the Lithuanian World Union, also drafted during the Congress, called for a cultural and economic union of Lithuanians in different countries. However World War II and Lithuania's occupation interrupted the work. Many educated Lithuanians fled to western countries, hoping to avoid approaching Soviet repressions. In 1946 the Lithuanian community in Germany established the Lithuanian Deportees Community, which aimed at consolidating and helping Lithuanians in Germany. In 1949 Lithuania's Supreme Liberation Committee (VLIK), established in 1943, delivered the Lithuanian Charter and the Constitutions of the Lithuanian World Community, which solemnly pledged to support and unite all Lithuanians outside Lithuania's borders and promote Lithuanian culture and language abroad. The Lithuanian Charter also proclaimed:

:a nation is a natural community of people;

a human has birthright to freely profess and promote his nationality;
a Lithuanian remains a Lithuanian everywhere and always;
his parents maintained the Lithuanian national consciousness; a Lithuanian relays it to the generations yet unborn, to remain alive;
a language is the strongest tie to the national community;
the Lithuanian language is the most precious national honor for a Lithuanian;
national solidarity is the highest national virtue.

In the 1950s, many Lithuanians from Germany moved to the United States. Canada, Australia. South America and other countries, where they established new branches of the Lithuanian Community. 1955 saw elections to the first Lithuanian Community Council in the U.S., which allowed better coordination among the different Lithuanian groups. In 1960, Lithuanians in the U.S., among them future President of Lithuania Valdas Adamkus, collected about 40,000 signatures and petitioned the United States government to intervene in the ongoing deportations of Lithuanians to Siberia conducted by the Soviets.

In August 2006, President Valdas Adamkus attended the opening ceremony of the World Lithuanian Community's 12th Seimas. Adamkus proposed new goals for the Community as it was facing new challenges which had to be accepted and dealt with because a new wave of Lithuanians had left their homeland since the declaration of independence in 1990.

== Structure ==
The Lithuanian World Community consists of local Lithuanian Communities around the world, currently numbering 36. The highest body is the Seimas of the Lithuanian World Community. Its main goal is to periodically adopt and review the Community's strategy and program. Each country sends at least one representative to the Seimas, which gathers every three years (1958–1997 it gathered every five years). The Seimas also elects the Community Council to deal with day-to-day issues. As of 2012, 13 Community Councils had been elected:

1. 1958 in New York City. Elected Chairmen Jonas Matulionis and Dr. Juozas Sungaila.
2. 1963 in Toronto (Canada). Elected Chairman Bachunas-Bačiūnas
3. 1968 in New York (USA). Chairman Juozas J. Bachunas-Bačiūnas, after his death Stasys Barzdukas
4. 1973 in Washington D.C. (USA). Chairman Bronius Nainys
5. 1978 in Toronto (Canada). Chairman Vytautas Kamantas
6. 1983 in Chicago (USA). Chairman Vytautas Kamantas
7. 1988 in Toronto (Canada). Chairman Dr. Vytautas Bieliauskas
8. 1992 in Lemont, Illinois (USA). Chairman Bronius Nainys
9. 1997 in Vilnius (Lithuania). Chairman Vytautas Kamantas
10. 2000 in Vilnius (Lithuania). Chairman Vytautas Kamantas
11. 2003 in Vilnius (Lithuania). Chairman Gabrielius Žemkalnis
12. 2006 in Vilnius (Lithuania). Chairwoman Regina Narušienė
13. 2012 in Vilnius (Lithuania). Chairwoman Danguolė Navickienė
14. 2015 in Vilnius (Lithuania). Chairwoman Dalia Henke
