= National Committee for a Free Europe =

Anti-communist CIA front organization

The National Committee for a Free Europe, later known as Free Europe Committee, was an anti-communist Central Intelligence Agency (CIA) front organization, founded on June 1, 1949, in New York City, which worked for the spreading of NATO influence in Central and Eastern Europe and to covertly destabilize Eastern Bloc countries.

== History ==
The committee was founded by Allen Dulles, later to be Director of Central Intelligence, in conjunction with DeWitt Clinton Poole. Early board members included Dwight Eisenhower, Lucius D. Clay, Cecil B. DeMille, Henry Luce, Mark Ethridge, Charles Phelps Taft II and DeWitt Wallace. From 1951 to 1952, Charles Douglas Jackson served as its president. The organization created and oversaw the anti-communist broadcast service Radio Free Europe. CIA subsidies to the Free Europe Committee ended in 1971 which caused restructuring to its operations.

The Free Europe Committee sent balloons with leaflets from West Germany to the Eastern Bloc countries. Each balloon was able to drop 100,000 leaflets.

== See also ==
- American Committee for the Liberation of the Peoples of Russia
- Balloon campaigns in Korea, for similar balloon-and-leaflet campaigning by South Korean NGOs.
- Brutus Coste
- Crusade for Freedom
- "Free Albania" National Committee
- Committee for a Free Lithuania
