= Jurgis Bielinis =

Lithuanian farmer, book smuggler and publisher

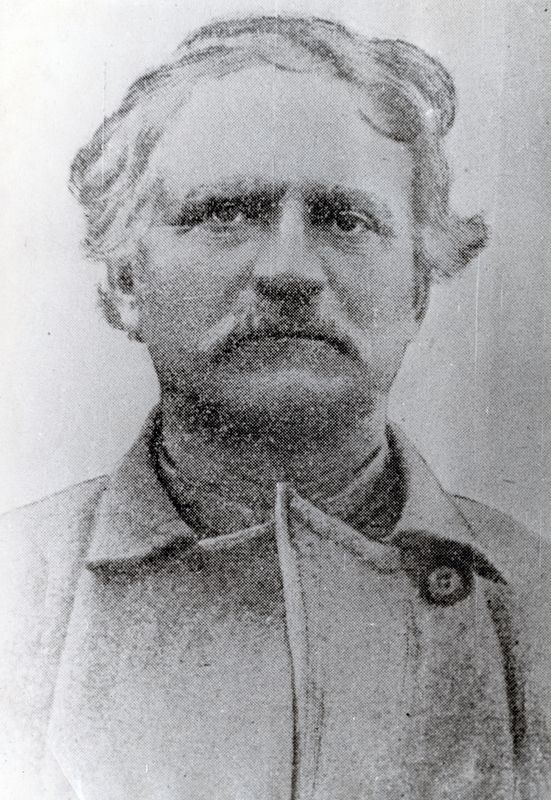
- Born: 16 March 1846; Purviškiai I, Kovno Governorate, Russian Empire
- Died: 18 January 1918 (aged 71); Katinai, Ober Ost
- Burial place: Churchyard of Suostas
- Other names: Pen names: Bieliakas, Jakulis, Ministeris, Baltasis Erelis
- Occupations: Farmer, book smuggler, publisher
- Years active: 1873–1918
- Children: Kipras Bielinis

Jurgis Bielinis (16 March 1846 – 18 January 1918) was one of the main organizers of the illegal book-smuggling at the time of the Lithuanian press ban (1864–1904). Bielinis is informally referred to as the King of Book Smugglers. Since 1989, Bielinis's birthday (16 March) is commemorated as the Day of Book Smugglers (Knygnešio diena).

Around 1885 Bielinis founded the Garšviai Book Smuggling Society. They purchased large quantities of Lithuanian publications in East Prussia, smuggled them across the Prussia–Russia border, and distributed across Lithuania reaching as far as Riga and Jelgava in present-day Latvia. The Garšviai Society avoided more serious legal troubles for almost a decade. Bielinis evaded police capture and continued to smuggle books living a nomadic lifestyle – he continuously moved from one sympathetic Lithuanian family to another, never staying too long at one location. Active as a book smuggler for 32 years, Bielinis was arrested five times but never tried or sentenced and developed a folk hero reputation for his ability to outsmart the police.

He has published three issues of newspaper Baltasis erelis (The White Eagle) in 1897, 1911, and 1912, several booklets, and a few articles in the Lithuanian press including Aušra, Varpas, Ūkininkas, Tėvynės sargas, Vienybė lietuvninkų Lietuvos ūkininkas, Vilniaus žinios. His main area of interest was the various injustices suffered by the Lithuanian serfs and peasants at the hands of the large landowners. In 1897, he published a history of Lithuania using the text by Simonas Daukantas up to year 1201 and then adding his own text.

== Biography ==
=== Early life ===
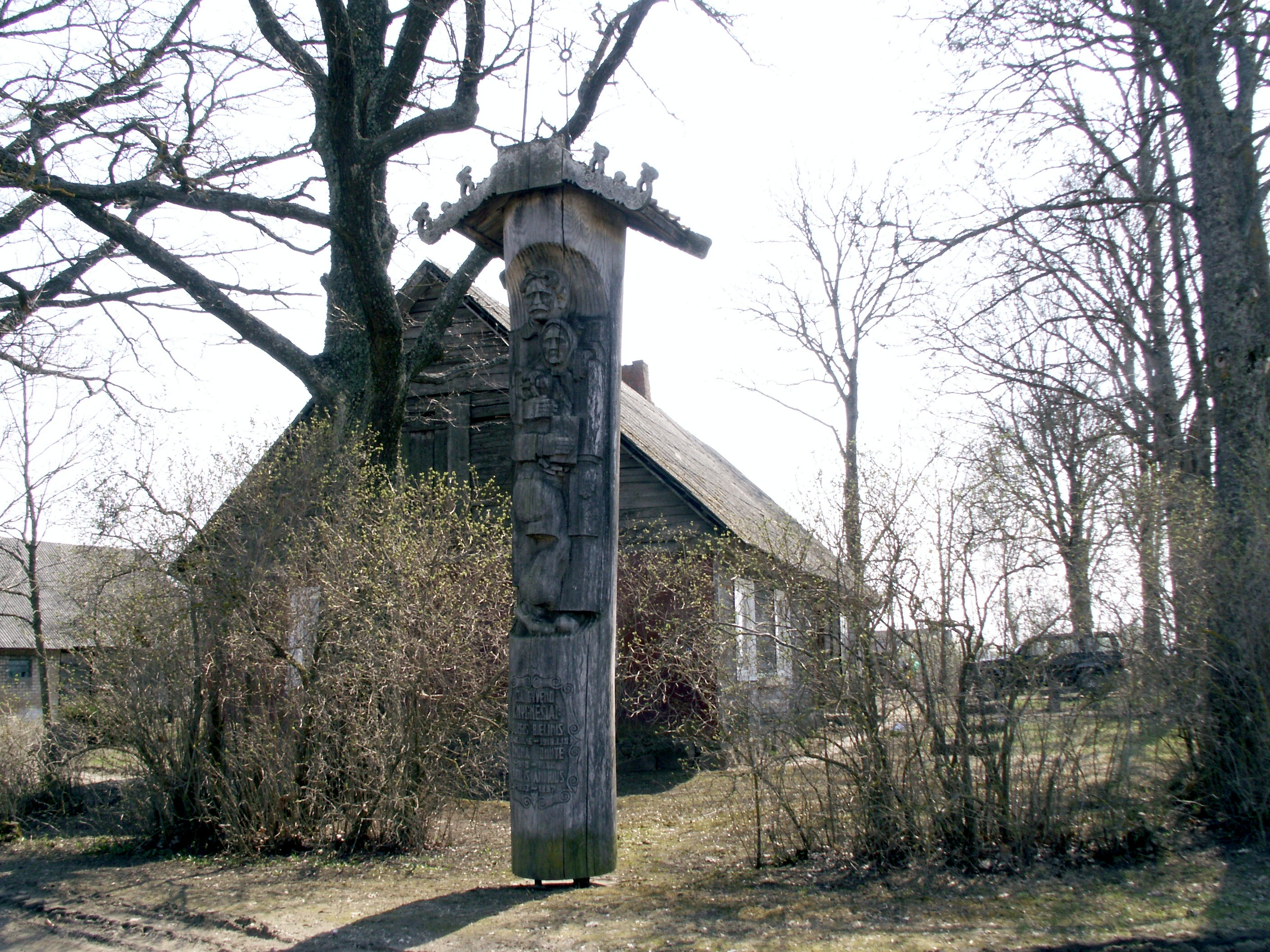
Memorial at Bielinis' birthplace in Purviškiai

Bielinis was born to a family of Lithuanian serfs on 28 March [O.S. 16 March] 1846 in Purviškiai I in Biržai District, then part of the Russian Empire. The village belonged to Janusz Kościałkowski, the owner of Papilys. Bielinis' family worked about two voloks of land and he helped with farm work and herding. He learned to read and write without attending a school. In August 1860, Bielinis' father died leaving him in change of the farm and two younger siblings. Serfdom was abolished in 1861 but former serfs still needed to buy out their land. During the Uprising of 1863, the Battle of Biržai was fought near Purviškiai, but Bielinis was later able to prove that he did not participate in the uprising. The uprising resulted in the Lithuanian press ban – the prohibition of Lithuanian-language texts printed in the Latin alphabet. Bielinis became involved in several local disputes with a land surveyor, inn owner, manor tenant. He felt that his lack of education prevented him from winning the disputes. His newborn son and wife died in late 1867 or early 1868, and Bielinis decided to rent part of his farm and use the money to pursue primary education in Šiauliai, Mitau (Jelgava), Riga. He struggled financially and in five years was able to complete three grades. In fall 1873, he traveled to Kaunas with hopes of completing the fourth grade, but was robbed of his money. Left penniless, Bielinis met two Lithuanian book smugglers who worked with bishop Motiejus Valančius and suggested that Bielinis make some money by distributing Lithuanian books in the countryside.

=== Beginnings ===
From fall 1873, Bielinis worked on selling various, mostly religious, Lithuanian books in the countryside for about three years. He obtained them in Kaunas via bishop Motiejus Valančius and his assistants or in Vilnius from the Józef Zawadzki printing shop which still had a permit to sell off pre-1864 Lithuanian books. Bielinis' biographers often claim that Valančius gave an envelope with 2,000 or 3,000 rubles to Bielinis for him to deliver to his publisher priest Johann Zabermann in East Prussia, but that is doubtful that Valančius would trust a new person when his earlier courier was caught in 1871. He still wanted to complete his primary education and then study at the Kaunas Priest Seminary, but lack of funds and his 30 years of age forced him to return to his farm in 1876. Bielinis remarried and had five children born in 1878–1889. He liked to read and continued to support book smugglers. He became more active again after Aušra, the first Lithuanian periodical, was published in 1883. He established contacts with Kazimieras Ūdra and founded the Garšviai Book Smuggling Society around 1885. Bielinis began visiting Martynas Jankus in Bitėnai and Otto von Mauderode in Tilsit, East Prussia. According to the memoirs of Jankus, one time Bielinis and Martynas Survila bought copies of the popular prayer book Aukso altorius (Golden Altar) at 0.75 rubles and were able to immediately sell them to a priest for 3 rubles each, netting a quick profit of 600 rubles. In summer 1887, Bielinis was taken from his home and briefly arrested, but it most likely related to a local land dispute and not to smuggling activities.

In 1885, Bielinis published an appeal in Aušra in which he proposed a cooperative to purchase land from the large manor owners. It was the only text by Bielinis printed in Aušra and his proposal went unanswered. In 1886, Bielinis agreed to work on getting a priest appointed to Daujėnai, a town with a brick church but no permanent priest. If successful, he was to be paid a commission by town residents. Bielinis petitioned bishop Mečislovas Leonardas Paliulionis to appoint a priest and a local landowner to donate land to the church so that the priest could support himself, but his requests were denied. Around the same time, he agreed to petition the government to return the Catholic church in Paparčiai to the faithful. The church was closed in 1864 by orders of Mikhail Muravyov-Vilensky. According to Bielinis, he traveled twice to Saint Petersburg to plead the case, but it is unknown what institutions he petitioned. The church was sold in an auction with orders to demolish it. When the demolition started, locals attacked Russian officials leading to a large trial and a search of Bielinis' home in 1890.

In 1886–1887, Bielinis improved his farm (e.g. dug out drainage canals, implemented crop rotation) possibly based on farming practices he observed in East Prussia. In 1888, he rented out his farm and traveled to Western Europe. It is unknown what prompted him to the journey. In Hanover, he ordered a painting of a white eagle and later a few prints of this painting, but they were confiscated by customs officers. Bielinis, likely introduced through a Lithuanian organization Želmuo, participated in a Polish émigré congress in Paris as a representative from Lithuania. The delegates discussed independence of Poland but Bielinis protested declarations that Lithuania was an inseparable part of Poland and was asked to leave.

=== Book smuggling ===
The Garšviai Book Smuggling Society became more active in fall 1888 when Bielinis returned from Western Europe. Bielinis, known as ministeris (minister), led the illegal society. They hired Antanas Bružys, who had a legal permit to cross the Prussia–Russia border, to transport large quantities of books and other publications. Then they recruited various helpers to hide and distribute the publications across Lithuania. Bielinis distributed the publications to Joniškėlis, Linkuva, Pasvalys, Pumpėnai, Pušalotas, Rozalimas, Smilgiai, Vaškai, even reached Riga and Mitau (Jelgava) in present-day Latvia where his son Kipras attended a school. He also continued to travel to East Prussia to purchase books (though he did not transport them across the border). He also acted as the messenger and courier between Lithuanian students and activists in Latvia who wrote Lithuanian texts and publishers in East Prussia. Bielinis was caught and beaten by border patrols at least on one occasion around 1891. For about a decade, the Garšviai Book Smuggling Society avoided more serious run-ins with the police likely due to the police chief in Naujamiestis who supported the Lithuanian press.

In April 1890, Bileinis home was searched by the police in connection with the skirmish during the church demolition in Paparčiai. The police found two bags of books, but since there were no anti-Tsarist texts, Bielinis faced only three-month arrest or a fine of 300 rubles. Since Bielinis was not present, the police dropped the case. Nevertheless, Bielinis became more careful, avoided public appearances, and returned home infrequently, mostly at night. From 1891, he lived with Ūdra in Garšviai. In February 1894, Bružys, Ūdra, and Bielinis were caught transporting two cart loads worth of publications (total of 4,068 copies) near Raseiniai. They managed to bribe themselves out of arrest, but the books and horses were confiscated. In April 1894, Ūdra's neighbor accidentally found two packets with books and newspapers and gave them to the police which searched Ūdra's home in June and found more than 450 copies of newspapers (mainly Žemaičių ir Lietuvos apžvalga) and 37 books. Perhaps due to bribes, the case lingered at the local police station for more than a year. In November 1894, Bružys was caught with 1,254 books and 481 newspapers. Because some of these had anti-Tsarists texts, he was sentenced to two years in prison and three years in exile. In April 1895, Bielinis' brother Andrius was caught by the German police in Tilsit (Sovetsk) and handed over to the Russians. He was sentenced to one year in prison and five years of exile. He attempted to escape to the United States, but became ill and had his left leg amputated in New York. Invalided, he returned to Lithuania, was caught by police, and exiled to Yaransk where he died in 1901. Ūdra was caught in June 1895 starting the Garšviai trial. In October 1896, Ūdra was sentenced to three years in prison and five years in exile. Five other men received various sentences, while Bielinis evaded capture. He escaped a policeman not too far from his home in Purviškiai in August 1896. The police launched an investigation and organized a wide search, including several ambushes, but by February 1897 was forced to conclude that they were unable to conclusively prove that the escaped man was Bielinis.

Despite arrests and police investigations, Bielinis did not abandon book smuggling but did not organize another book smuggling society and purchased more religious books which attracted much less attention from the police. He brought books to some of the noted Lithuanian figures, including Gabrielė Petkevičaitė-Bitė, Petras Avižonis, Vladas Požela, Jonas Jablonskis, Gabrielius Landsbergis-Žemkalnis. Bielinis also smuggled some publications in the Latgalian language that were similarly banned by the Tsarist authorities. He did not have a more permanent living quarters and continued to move from one sympathetic Lithuanian family to another. He relied on a network of trusted associates who helped to procure, hide, and distribute books as well as with food, sleeping quarters, or a space to write and rest. Avoiding the police, he stopped visiting his home and had to meet family members at a trusted location. He kept changing his appearance (e.g. grow or shave his beard) and horses, even adapting his carriage to regional design differences. Such nomadic lifestyle negatively affected Bielinis' health and in 1902 he published an appeal to Lithuanian Americans asking for personal financial aid. In February 1903, Bielinis was arrested by the police in a village near Linkuva with copies of books on the Kražiai massacre and moved from a police station in Pasvalys to Panevėžys. He was sent back to Pasvalys to determine his true identity, but he managed to escape – dressed only in a shirt during the winter, he ran barefoot in a stream to cover his tracks to a nearby acquaintance. He took about six weeks to recover from the ordeal. Despite many run-ins with the police, Bielinis was never tried or sentenced. There were many stories, anecdotes, and folk legends on how Bielinis escaped or outsmarted the police. For example, there are stories on how he hid from the police under his wife's skirt or how he pretended to be a beggar and even received a couple coins from a policeman.

=== Publisher ===
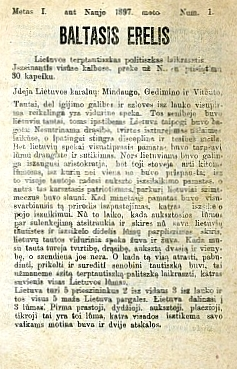
Baltasis erelis published by Bielinis in 1897

In June 1895, Vienybė lietuvninkų and Žemaičių ir Lietuvos apžvalga published an announcement that a new newspaper Liuosybė (Independence) will be published in various languages of the subjugated people of the Russian Empire, including Lithuanian, Latvian, Estonian, Polish, Belarusian, Finnish, even Caucasian and Siberian languages. It was signed by Juozapas Baltasis, a pen name of Bielinis. The Garšviai Book Smuggling Society started organizing its own printing press in late 1894 by purchasing equipment and supplies through Martynas Jankus. After the arrests, Bielinis took over the press which was not discovered by the police. In fall 1896, Bielinis took the press to Steponas Povilionis in Gripkeliai and they started working on a newspaper Baltasis erelis (The White Eagle) – the title referenced the coat of arms of Poland which Bielinis believed Poles took from the Lithuanians. The 8-page publication appeared with 1897 date. The first seven pages summarized the history of Lithuania that Bielinis was working on at the same time. The last page discussed the coronation of Nicholas II of Russia and how a Lithuanian noble spent 10,000 rubles on the festivities and expressed belief that if the nobility could spend so frivolously on a foreign Tsar, they would give money to a new international newspaper (echoing the announcement published in June 1895). The newspaper was signed Juozapas Baltasis Erelis Lietuvos Karalius. Spausdinta Lietuvos griuvėsiuose. (Juozapas White Eagle King of Lithuania. Published in the ruins of Lithuania). But it was an unrealistic goal and only one issue of Baltasis erelis appeared. The fate of the printing press is unknown. Vaclovas Biržiška believed that Bielinis transferred it to the Social Democratic Party of Lithuania which wanted to publish a newspaper in Vilnius, but that press was confiscated by the police in 1899.

In 1897, Bielinis published a work on the history of Lithuania at the press of Martynas Jankus. He took the first 96 pages of Pasakojimas apie veikalus lietuvių tautos senovėje (Story of the Deeds of the Ancient Lithuanians) by Simonas Daukantas up to year 1201 that were printed by Jonas Kriaučiūnas at the press of Jankus in 1893, added history up to the Union of Lublin in 1569 based on Daukantas and other historians, and wrote an original history between 1569 and the abolition of serfdom in 1861 that focused on the local history of the Upytė district.

Bielinis believed that the Lithuanian press organized by the intelligentsia did not pay enough attention to the injustices suffered by the peasants – while traveling across Lithuania to distribute the illegal press, he had collected a number of stories of discrimination and corrupt practices of local landowners. According to Jankus, Bielinis realized a 4,000 ruble profit from publishing 5,000 copies of a book on Catholic saints that his brother Andrius organized before his exile to Siberia. Bielinis likely used the profit to finance the publication of his own brochures and booklets that by his own admission cost him about 1,000 rubles. In 1899, Bielinis commissioned Jankus to publish 3,000 copies of his 64-page booklet Istoriszki pritikimai isz ukininku gyvenimo Lietuvoje (Stories from the Lives of Farmers in Lithuania). It started with a historical overview of serfdom in Lithuania, included numerous specific incidents of peasant discrimination, and ended with an advice to emigrate to Canada where one could get free land according to the Dominion Lands Act.

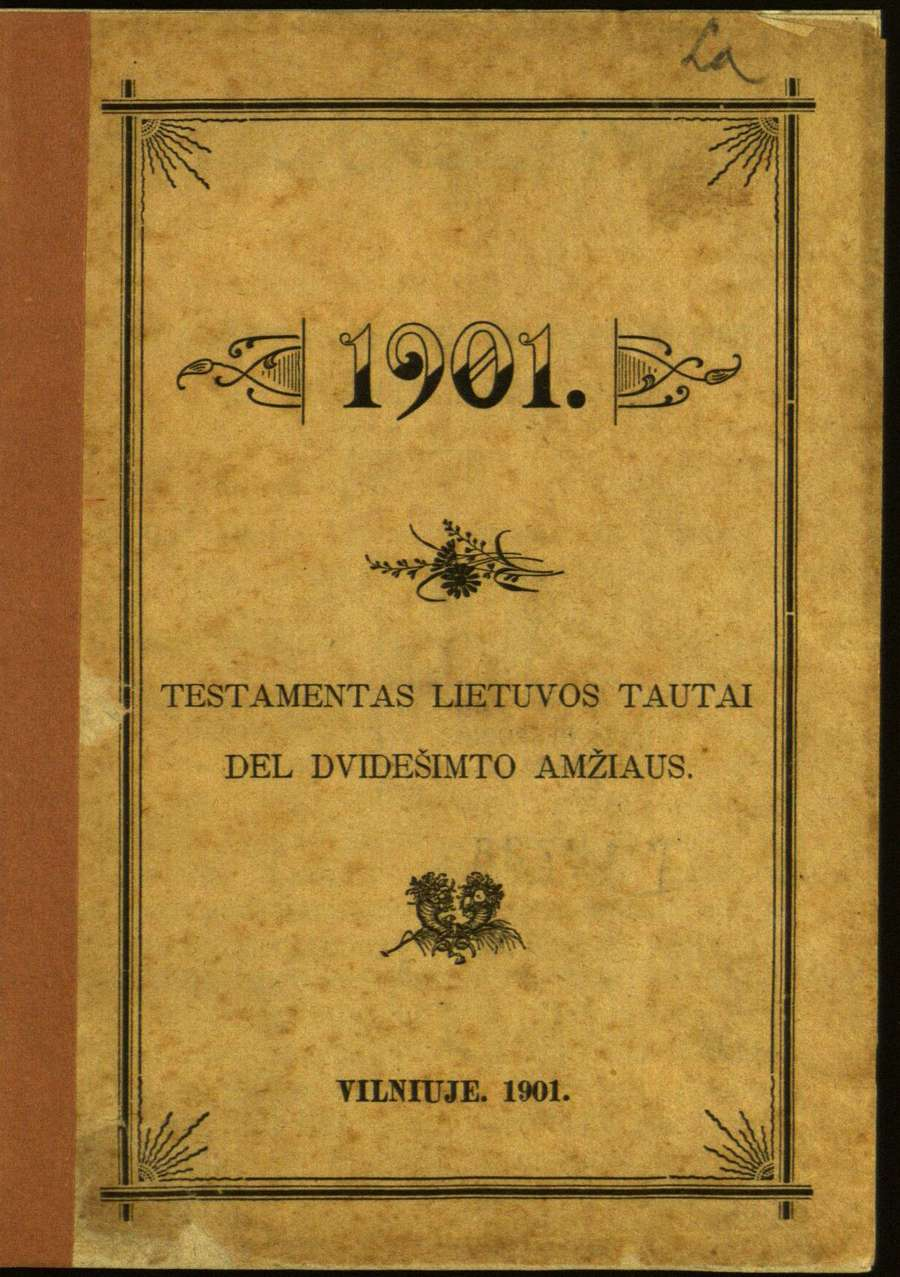
Cover of 1901

In 1900, Bielinis published 80-page 1900. Knįga paaukauta atminimui sukaktuvių devynioliktojo amžiaus (1900. Book Dedicated to the End of the 19th Century) in which he provided a short history of Lithuania and then described injustices suffered by the Lithuanian peasants. In particular, he highlighted the case of Ignacy Karp, a noble from Upytė, who freed his serfs in his last will (republished in the booklet) but his heirs did not follow the last will and continued to exploit the serfs. According to Bielinis, the Karp family destroyed 300 farms and took some 15,000 dessiatins of land. He ended the work with a personal story about injustices he suffered as a farmer in Purviškiai. The following year, Bielinis followed up with the 16-page booklet 1901. Testamentas Lietuvos tautai del dvidešimto amžiaus (1901. Testament to the Lithuanian Nation for the 20th Century) in which he provided his ideas and suggestions for improving conditions in Lithuania. His ideas were naive and unrealistic and remained unnoticed by other activists. For example, elimination of the nobility social class, Lithuania's involvement in foreign affairs of Austria-Hungary, France, and Germany, public removal and whipping of the statue of Mikhail Muravyov-Vilensky, etc. In 1902, Bilienis published another 72-page booklet Lietuvos adminitsracija (Administration of Lithuania) in which Bielinis retold fiction texts by Eliza Orzeszkowa (novel Niziny), Stasys Matulaitis, Kazimieras Pakalniškis, articles published in Tėvynės sargas as well as personal experiences of injustice and listed other instances of discrimination by the Karp and von der Ropp families. Matulaitis criticized the work in Varpas for its disorganized material.

On 22 March 1902, Tsar Nicholas II of Russia issued an order to create a commission that would suggest ways to improve peasants' conditions in the Northwestern Krai. Bielinis reacted to this order by publishing a proclamation urging Lithuanians to organize their own commission. In 1903, he published a second proclamation agitating for the Lithuanian commission and offering to write a book in German on the poor conditions in Lithuania for the International Socialist Congress to be held in August 1904. These proposals were rebuffed by Varpas as naive and hopeless dreams. In May 1904, just after the Lithuanian press ban was lifted, Bielinis published a 16-page booklet with seven protocols with accusations against local landowners and advice to peasants on how to recover seized property. In this publication, he promised to translate these protocols to Russian, establish a dedicated periodical devoted to documenting the cases of injustice, and send copies to Russian officials and the Tsar himself demanding to right the wrong.

=== After the press ban ===
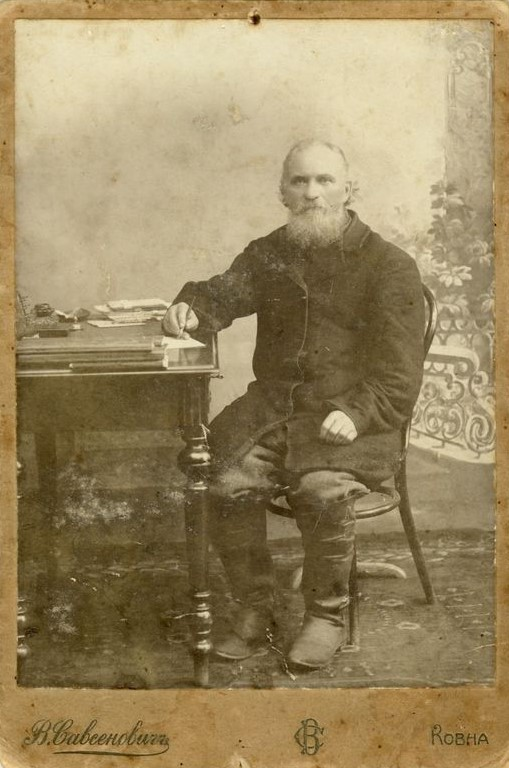
Bielinis around 1915

The press ban was lifted in May 1904 and cases against book smugglers were dismissed. Bielinis could return home to Purviškiai. Bielinis and his family supported the Russian Revolution of 1905. He helped his son Kipras to smuggle social-democratic literature from East Prussia. Another son Juozas was elected representative of the local community in Suostas and organized a public speech by Ernestas Galvanauskas to explain the resolutions adopted at the Great Seimas of Vilnius. Juozas was later arrested and imprisoned in Panevėžys for two and a half months and faced criminal charges as late as 1910. Bielinis described the events in a short correspondence published in Lietuvos ūkininkas and a longer text that remained unpublished.

Bielinis continued to be interested in injustices suffered by the peasants. In April 1905 letter to Martynas Jankus, he complained that Lithuanian newspapers published essentially nothing on peasant affairs and again raised the idea of publishing his own periodical. Unable to establish his own newspaper, he sent letters, articles and other material to other periodicals but they remained mostly unpublished. In 1907, Lietuvos ūkininkas published his article on the land divisions after the abolition of serfdom in Sebentiškis. The editors put a note that the article would benefit from specific facts (such as amounts charged for land) but rejected five similar historical articles due to lack of space and current relevance. Bielinis attempted to help peasants in Sebentiškis to buy manor lands after the manor owner died without heirs. The manor was purchased by Antanas Chodkauskas, future father-in-law of President Antanas Smetona. For a fist fight with Chodkauskas' son over a disputed pasture land Bielinis received six weeks of arrest.

In 1909, Draugija magazine announced a competition for a work of fiction on the lives of contemporary Lithuanian nobles. Bielinis submitted the only entry to the contest, but it was not a work of fiction. Rather it was a historical essay on the relationship between Poles and Lithuanians. The work was rejected and Bielinis took on to publish it himself. He published two issues of the revived Baltasis erelis that he had first published in 1897. He published the first 12-page issue in July 1911. Its named publisher and editor was theocrat of Lithuania Juozapas Baltasis Erelis. He published excerpts from his work written for Draugija, his thoughts on a discussion that started in Viltis about collecting memoirs on the serfdom in Lithuania, five petitions on specific injustices suffered by peasants addressed to the State Duma. Lithuanian newspapers Vienybė lietuvninkų, Viltis, Lietuvos žinios ridiculed Baltasis erelis for its brief references to Bielinis as the king of Lithuania. The second issue of Baltasis erelis appeared in July 1912. Bielinis explained the delay (he had promised to publish the newspaper monthly) due to financial difficulties and due to his investigation of new order by the Tsar to pray for his and his family. He traveled across Lithuania investigating whether Catholic priests and believers followed the order and prepared a complaint for the Holy See.

World War I reached Biržai area in August 1915. The German Army wanted to recruit Bielinis as translator as he knew German, but he hid. His family including his wife retreated into Russia and returned to Lithuania already after Bielinis' death. According to memoirs of Gabrielė Petkevičaitė-Bitė, Bielinis visited her and spoke about independent Lithuania. Later, German police came to ask her about a letter that Bielinis wrote in which he promised Germans to help win the war if they would declare independence of Lithuania and recognize him as king of Lithuania. It appears that Bielinis published a 16-page prayer book to Hyacinth of Poland asking for peace, but it was not distributed and likely burned down in 1958. In November 1917, he wrote letters to editors of German newspapers Tilsiter Allgemeine Zeitung and Kölnische Deutsche Zeitung offering to become an intermediary in brokering world peace. In 1917, Bielinis home burned down destroying many documents and manuscripts. He then lived with various friends and acquaintances. He fell by a cross in the Katinai village and died shortly after. He was buried three days later in the churchyard of Suostas.

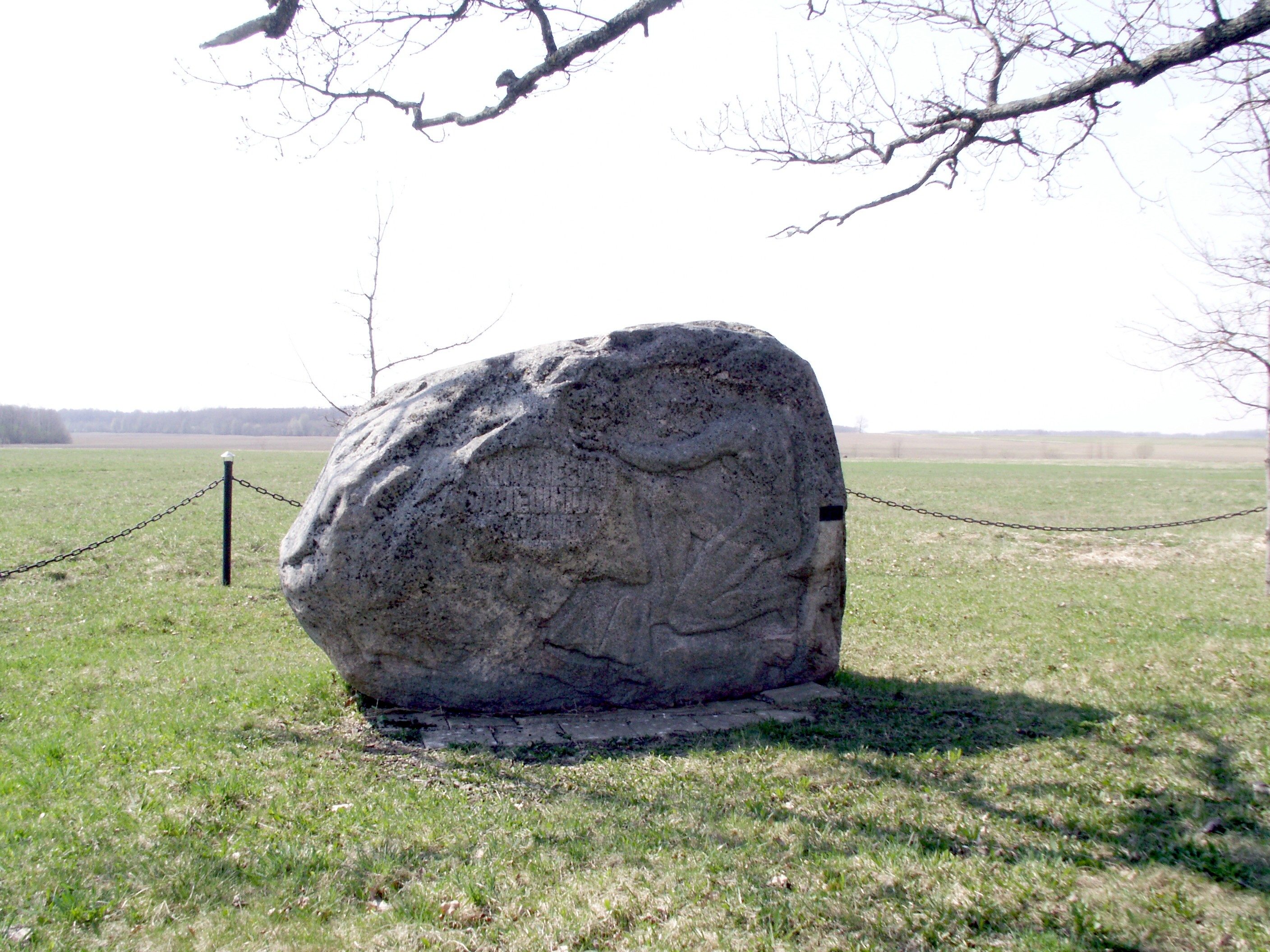
Memorial stone to Bielinis in his native village unveiled in 1989

== Legacy ==
After Lithuania regained independence in 1918, Bielinis gained recognition for his book smuggling activities. The first article about him was published by Vaclovas Biržiška in Mūsų senovė. His wife was awarded the Independence Medal in 1928. In 1931, Alfredas Šlikas published a booklet with Bielinis' biography. In 1932, Lithuanian youth organizations (Scouts, Pavasaris, Riflemen) decorated the grave of Bielinis and built a pyramid of field stones with an ornate metal cross. The primary school in Suostas was named after Bielinis. Streets in several cities and towns, including in Vilnius, Kaunas, Panevėžys, Mažeikiai, are named after Bielinis. The wooden cross under which Bielinis fell and later died was discovered in 1990 by Bielinis' grandson and is exhibited in the chapel of the Bistrampolis Manor. Carved in 1881, it is one of the oldest surviving wooden crosses in Lithuania.

Since 1989, Bielinis's birthday (16 March) is celebrated and commemorated as the Day of Book Smugglers (Knygnešio diena).

== Bibliography ==
- Bielinis, Algirdas (20 February 1990). "Kryžius, po kuriuo mirė mano senelis knygnešys Jurgis Bielinis". Knygnešių krivulė (in Lithuanian). 5. ISSN 2029-1299.
- Kalasauskienė, Leonora (2002-12-16). "Jurgis Bielinis". Visuotinė lietuvių enciklopedija (in Lithuanian). Mokslo ir enciklopedijų leidybos centras.
- Klimka, Libertas (2010-01-10). "Knygnešio dieną minint". Voruta (in Lithuanian).
- Merkys, Vytauras (1991). Simonas Daukantas (PDF) (in Lithuanian) (2nd ed.). Vilnius: Vyturys. ISBN 5-7900-0405-9.
- Merkys, Vytauras (1994). Draudžiamosios lietuviškos spaudos kelias: 1864-1904 (in Lithuanian). Vilnius: Mokslo ir enciklopedijų leidykla. ISBN 9785420011812.
- Misius, Kazys; Kaluškevičius, Benjaminas (2006). Didysis knygnešys Jurgis Bielinis (in Lithuanian). Vilnius: Diemedis. ISBN 9986231310.
- Nagrockienė, Ingrida (20 January 2018). "Panevėžiečių sodyba saugo knygnešio paslaptis" (in Lithuanian). Sekundė.
- Stražas, A. S. (Fall 1996). "Lithuania 1863-1893". Lituanus. 42 (3). ISSN 0024-5089. Archived from the original on 2016-12-12.
