= Garšviai Book Smuggling Society =

Late 19th-century literary crime syndicate

Location of Garšviai in present-day Lithuania

The Garšviai Book Smuggling Society was an illegal society of Lithuanian book smugglers during the Lithuanian press ban enacted in 1864. It was one of the oldest book smuggler societies. Active from around 1883 to 1895, it was also one of the longest operating societies.

It was based in at the home of Kazys Ūdra in the Garšviai village near Naujamiestis, Panevėžys. Led by Ūdra and Jurgis Bielinis, the society organized a network of trusted associates who would purchase the publications in East Prussia, smuggle them across the Prussia–Russia border, and distribute them in central Lithuania (mainly area around Panevėžys and Biržai). In total, historian Antanas Tyla registered 54 people as members or collaborators. The society smuggled both books and periodicals, delivering them to subscribers, though they were particularly dangerous – they needed to be smuggled frequently and they were deemed to be anti-Tsarist political texts bringing much stricter sentences than smuggling of "innocent" texts with religious prayers or agricultural advice.

For almost a decade, the society avoided more serious legal troubles. In February and April 1894, the society suffered financial losses due to confiscated property but managed to avoid a wider police investigation. In November 1894 and April 1895, two members of the society – Antanas Bružas and Andrius Bielinis – were arrested and sentenced to time in prison and exile, but the police did not uncover their connections to the Garšviai Society. The society unraveled when the police arrested Ūdra and found his notebook with names and addresses of his associates in June 1895. After a wide investigation, six men were put on trial while Jurgis Bielinis evaded capture. Ūdra and two others received two years in prison and five years in exile. Individual members of the society continued book smuggling, but the loss of the organized society disrupted the spread of the ideas of the Lithuanian National Revival in central Lithuania.

== Organization and members ==
The Lithuanian press ban was enacted in 1864 to facilitate the Russification after the failed Uprising of 1863. Lithuanian texts in the traditional Latin alphabet were strictly forbidden, while Lithuanian texts in the Cyrillic alphabet were encouraged and sponsored by the Tsarist government. Lithuanians starter publishing Lithuanian texts in East Prussia and smuggling the publications into Lithuania.

The villagers of Garšviai learned about the illegal press around 1882 when they received some Lithuanian books through Jonas Venckavičius who then worked in Saint Petersburg. Ūdra headed Venckavičius' urging to help with the distribution of the illegal press and searched for contacts with existing book smugglers. He was visited by Jurgis Bielinis and they agreed to cooperate. They recruited others, including Juozas Neteckis, Vincas Kazanauskas, Juozas Sakalauskas, Jonas Račiūnas. Around 1885, the men contributed 200 rubles each to purchase larger quantities of books. Its bookkeeping was handled by Adomas Lalukas and members likely used a Polish brochure on how to organize and run a society.

The society had about nine true members (those who contributed to its capital) and many collaborators who in one way or other helped to smuggle, hide, and distribute the publications or shelter the smugglers. In total, historian Antanas Tyla registered 54 people as members or collaborators. The society was likely led by Bielinis (nicknamed Minister) with Ūdra as his right-hand man. The society had several caches of publications in nearby villages. The largest was at the farm of Jurgis Dilkus in Baibokai. It also contained records of the society, but they were destroyed after arrests started in 1895. The society was based in Ūdra's home where Bielinis and Ladukas lived for a few years.

== Smuggling operation ==
Bielinis, Ūdra, and others purchased publications mainly from the press of Otto von Mauderode in Tilsit (his invoices did not survive) and much less from Martynas Jankus in Bitėnai (his invoices survived). They often walked to East Prussia on foot which took about two weeks. Then they needed to hire carts to transport books to the border, local peasants to carry the bags across the border, and then hire more carts to transport the books deeper into Lithuania. This transport system was frequently organized by Antanas Bružas who had a legal permit to cross the Prussia–Russia border. At one time, the society could smuggle about 15 bags of publications that cost some 400 rubles to purchase.

According to memoirs of Sakalauskas, he transported two carts worth of publications almost monthly, but there are not enough surviving records to determine at least an approximate number of trips taken to Prussia. The society accepted subscriptions for Lithuanian periodicals and smuggled them regularly without waiting for a larger transport. The publications were then distributed to various local smugglers and resellers. Some of them would arrive to Garšviai, while members of the society would deliver packets to others. They covered an area in central Lithuania approximately between Žeimelis, Krakės, Kavarskas, Užpaliai, and Nemunėlio Radviliškis, though some publications reached Kaunas, Mitau (Jelgava), Riga, Hrodna, Saint Petersburg, Moscow, even United States.

The society marked up the smuggled publications by about 50%, though prices varied based on publication and number of resellers. Many of the sales were made on account with promises to repay the full balance later while the society suffered losses due to police activities (bribes to policemen and loss of confiscated property). Overall, book smuggling was not a very profitable activity and Ūdra was known to have personal debts while other members became beggars. Occasionally, the society also received financial donations or earned money from other activities (e.g. escorting emigrants to the Prussian boarder).

== Smuggled publications ==
Category of books distributed by the Garšviai Society	Purchased from Jankus		Confiscated by police^{a}	
Category of books distributed by the Garšviai Society	Titles	Copies	Titles	Copies
Religious	12	780 (6.5%)	47	835 (27.4%)
History, culture, language	25	2,198 (18.3%)	9	653 (21.4%)
Fiction	19	4,103 (34.1%)	2	309 (10.1%)
Educational	10	1,261 (10.5%)	14	236 (7.7%)
Primers, textbooks	6	1,774 (14.7%)	6	180 (6%)
Calendars			3	541 (17.7%)
Agriculture	7	1,144 (9.5%)	10	152 (4.9%)
Other	1	765 (6.4%)	9	146 (4.8%)
Totals	80	12,025	111	3,052
^{a} Does not include approx. 2,068 books confiscated in February 1894 as there is no exact list

The most popular periodicals were Ūkininkas and Žemaičių ir Lietuvos apžvalga, though it also distributed Vienybė lietuvninkų published for Lithuanian Americans and Lietuwißka Ceitunga for Prussian Lithuanians. In total, the society distributed about 17 different Lithuanian periodicals. Based on surviving invoices by Martynas Jankus and lists of confiscated books by the police, the most popular books were religious prayer books (Jankus did not print much religious texts), historical and cultural texts, and fiction works. Religious texts were very popular and in high demand and the society could charge a larger mark up. Historical and cultural texts included works of Jonas Basanavičius, Konstancja Skirmuntt, Maironis, Petras Vileišis, a history by Simonas Daukantas that Bielinis finished and published in 1897, a translation of a history of Europe by Edward Augustus Freeman, etc.

Works of fictions were mostly collections of songs. Educational category was mostly various brochures by Petras Vileišis. The society also purchased unsold calendars, ripped off pages with dates, and used the remaining text as a bonus or a thank-you gift. Agricultural texts were mostly various supplements printed by Ūkininkas and brochures by Petras Vileišis. The society also purchased 765 copies of a booklet on dream interpretation. The police was more lenient and tolerant of non-political texts, i.e. religious, agricultural, educational texts and fiction works. Other texts, including all periodicals, were often deemed to be anti-Tsarit and could subject people to harsh prison sentences and exile.

In 1894, Justinas Kulikauskas purchased a small hand-operated printing press via Martynas Jankus so that the society could print its own proclamations. It was brought to Garšviai, but police searches and arrests did not allow to operate it. Bielinis took the press to Gripkeliai where he published a single issue of his newspaper Baltasis erelis (The White Eagle).

== Legal troubles ==
=== First police investigations ===
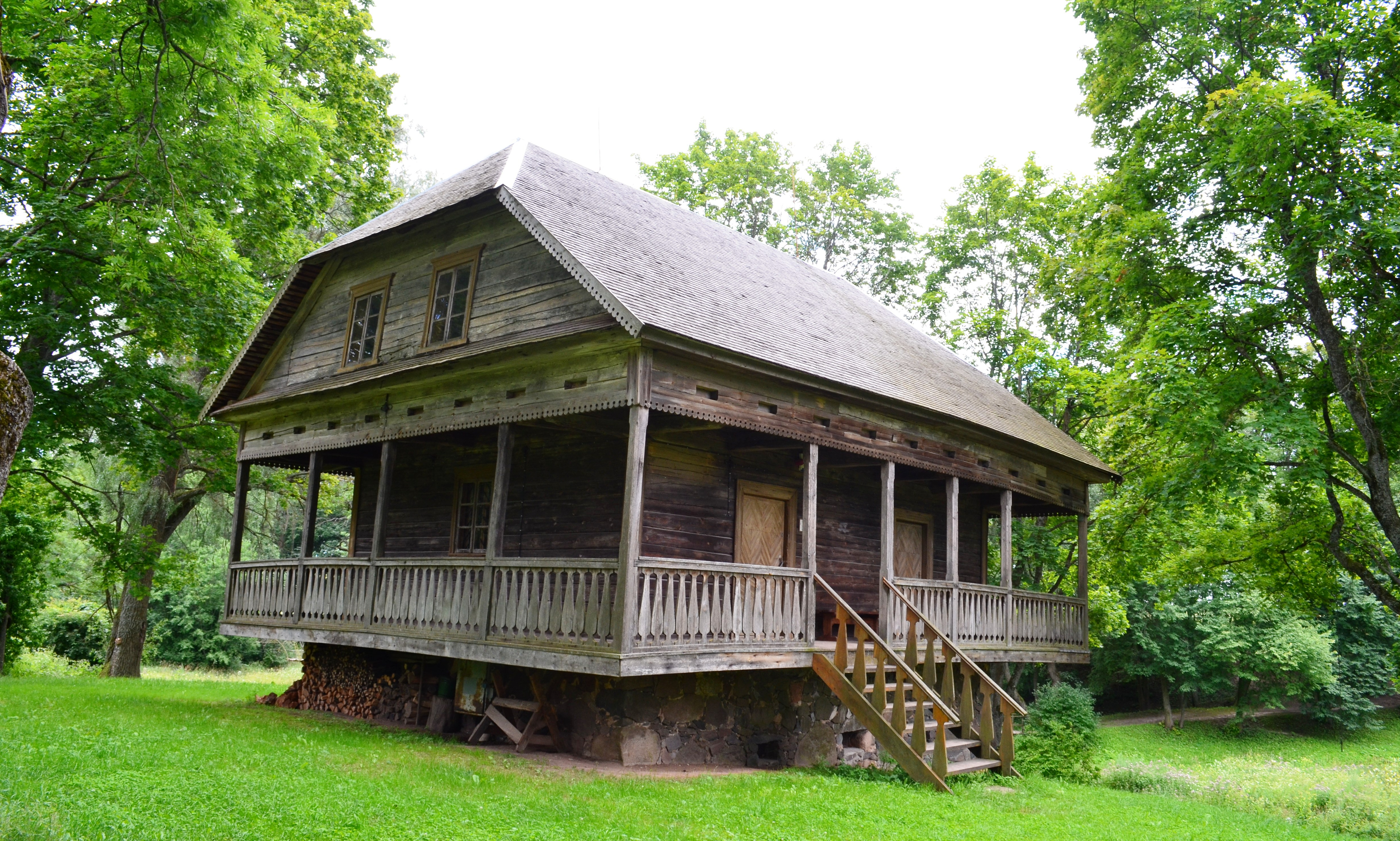
Former granary in Ustronė used as a hiding spot by the Garšviai Society, now a museum dedicated to Juozas Tumas-Vaižgantas and book smugglers

For almost a decade, the society had no serious trouble with the police. Just Bielinis was caught and beaten by Prussian boarder patrols around 1891. Local police constable in Naujamiestis turned a blind eye to the book smuggling activities.

On 16 February [O.S. 4 February] 1894, Bielinis, Bružas, and Ūdra transported two cartloads worth of Lithuanian publications. Near Raseiniai, about 55 kilometres (34 mi) from the border, they were stopped by a constable. They lost three horses, two carts, and more than 4,000 Lithuanian publications. According to the official report by the constable, he stopped the carts randomly and the three men ran away before he could clearly see their faces.

According to an account published by the Vienybė lietuvninkų, the constable was alerted by a local noble. Bružas escaped, while Bielinis and Ūdra bribed the constable 70 rubles to let them go. A similar report was published in Žemaičių ir Lietuvos apžvalga – these reports were too open and obvious making it more difficult for book smugglers to bribe policemen in the future and helping the police to identify the three men in 1895. The police investigate the newspaper reports of a bribe and concluded that it was nothing more than a smear and revenge campaign against the constable.

=== Search of Ūdra's home ===
On 26 April [O.S. 14 April] 1894, Nikodemas Škutas, a neighbor of Ūdra, accidentally found two bundles of Lithuanian publications. A veteran of the Imperial Russian Army, Škutas disapproved anti-government publications and, despite various pleas and threats, turned in the bundles to the police. The police investigated the incident and questioned Ūdra and Lalukas, but did not search Ūdra's house. The police learned about Bielinis, who could no longer live with Ūdra, but could not determine his last name. Six days after the bundles were turned in, the police intercepted a letter addressed to Ūdra in which he was asked to deliver eight issues of Varpas and Lithuanian books.

On 18 July 1894, six policemen searched Ūdra's home. Ūdra was not home at the time, but the police caught Vincas Kazanauskas who had a bag of 30 books and 34 periodicals. The search turned up 54 issues of Vienybė lietuvninkų, 407 issues of Žemaičių ir Lietuvos apžvalga, two letters by Ūdra's brother from United States in which he discussed the book smuggling, an illegal lottery ticket for an alarm clock, and other miscellaneous items.

The next day, the police questioned eleven men of the Garšviai village, but they defended Ūdra and claimed they knew nothing about any book smuggling ring. Kazanauskas, while chatting to his guard, admitted to book smuggling and about the existence of the Garšviai Book Smuggling Society. The case was transferred to the police district chief (ispravnic) in Panevėžys, but it (perhaps due to a bribe) lingered without further action for about a year. It was resumed only after Ūdra's arrest in June 1895.

=== Prison for Bružas ===
In November 1894, Antanas Bružas brought seven bundles of various publications to his home in Zaltriškiai. An anonymous informant alerted the police which found the bundles with 1,735 publications. He was initially fined 9,45 rubles, but then the police found out that 959 of these publications were anti-Tsarists. Bružas was imprisoned in February 1895 in Tauragė.

The case caught the attention of the Ministry of Justice as it was receiving alarming news about the increased number of anti-government texts being distributed in the Kovno Governorate and ordered to fully investigate and prosecute Bružas. His case was wrapped up in less than a month, and the police did not determine his ties to the Garšviai Society. Since he was accused of anti-government actions, his sentence needed to be confirmed by the Ministry of Justice and the Tsar. On 29 May [O.S. 17 May] 1895, the Tsar confirmed the sentence of two years in prison and three years of exile to the Vologda Governorate. He served the time in the Kresty Prison.

=== Prison for Bielinis ===
Russians long sought to enlist the help of the Prussian police in combating the book smuggling. Baron von Nolde, commander of the Russian border troops in Tauragė, asked Prussian police officer Witschel for help. On 18 April [O.S. 6 April] 1895, Andrius Bielinis, the younger brother of Jurgis Bielinis, was stopped by Witschel in Tilsit (now Sovetsk, Kaliningrad Oblast) after he bought 2,754 publications and hired a local to transport them to the Prussia–Russia border. Bielinis with the purchased books was transported to Plikiškė at the border, handed over to the Russian police, and detained in Tauragė. The next day, Witschel handed over three other Lithuanian men, but without the publications. Since there was no direct evidence, the men were released. Tilsit publishers and traders became scandalized and sued Witschel for lost profits who served nine months in prison.

The Russian police investigated Bielinis. They spent a lot of effort tracking down Teodoras Nekrašas whose identity papers Bielinis used in Prussia and searched Bielinis' birthplace in Purviškiai I, but was unable to establish his connections to the Garšviai Society. Since Bielinis carried a number of anti-government publications, including a booklet on the Kražiai massacre, he was sentenced to a year in prison and five years of exile in the Vologda Governorate.

=== Garšviai Society liquidated ===
==== Police investigation ====
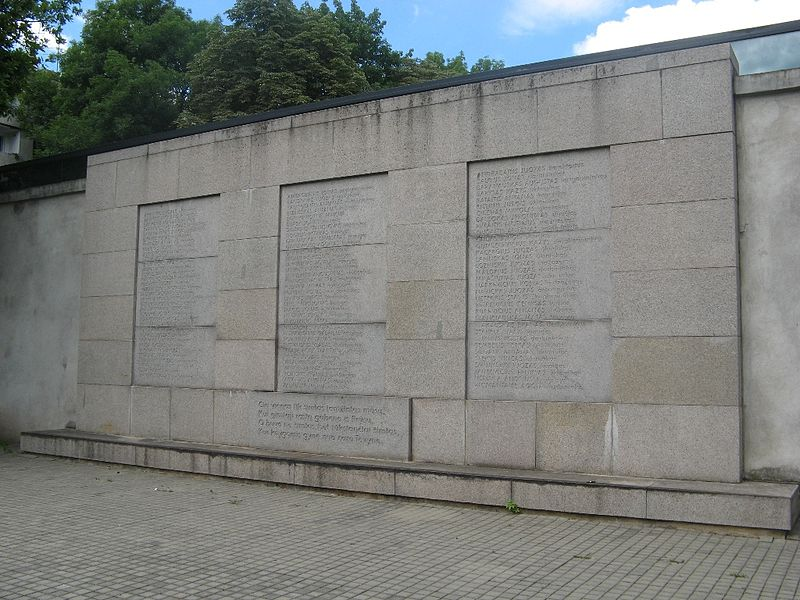
The Wall of Book Smugglers, a monument in Kaunas engraved with 100 names of book smugglers, includes eleven names associated with the Garšviai Society

On 25 June [O.S. 13 June] 1895, Ūdra traveled from Debeikiai via Anykščiai to Troškūnai to attend a parish festival of Anthony of Padua and meet other book smugglers. The police searched for a murderer and stopped Ūdra on the road. They found 30.5 rubles, two letters that discussed book smuggling, 166 religious images, and a book of Lithuanian songs. Ūdra was arrested and the case carefully investigated. He managed to warn Ladukas, but when the police searched Ūdra's home they found invoices for sold periodicals, Ūdra's notebook with names, addresses, and amounts owed, several books and religious images. Ladukas was arrested. The police also searched the homes of Vincas Kavoliūnas and Juozas Ūdra, cousin and brother of Ūdra, respectively, but found only five religious books and one issue of Ūkininkas.

The police found the earlier case against Ūdra which due to police negligence lingered with the police district chief (ispravnic) in Panevėžys for a year. The police combined the cases and launched an investigation against five men – Ūdra brothers, Ladukas, Kavoliūnas, and Kazanauskas. The notebook of Ūdra provided the police with a list of new names to investigate. The police questioned 24 people and determined additional members of the Garšviai Society – Jurgis Bielinis, Antanas Bružas, Kazys Domarkas, and Jonas Trūsas. The police was also able to determine the identities of the three men who were stopped near Raseiniai in February 1894. The police, however, did not find enough evidence against Juozas Ūdra and Kavoliūnas and their charges were dropped. In general, the men did not cooperate with the investigation and tried to implicate only those who would not suffer police persecutions, e.g. Jurgis Dilkus who died a month earlier or Justinas Kulikauskas who had emigrated to the United States.

==== Trials and sentences ====
The police did not locate Jurgis Bielinis and he avoided the trial. The others were tried for the possession and distribution of anti-government literature. The court in Vilnius suggested the sentences which were lengthened by the Ministry of Justice and the Tsar in October 1896. Ūdra was sentenced to two years in prison and five years of exile in east Siberia. Bružas received additional two years of exile. They faced additional sentences for the publications confiscated near Raseiniai in February 1894, but the police decided to drop the matter in October 1897. They already faced the strictest sentences given to Lithuanian book smugglers. Kazanauskas and Labukas received two years in prison and five years of exile in the Vologda Governorate. Domarkas was confined to the Kretinga Monastery for six months while Trūsas received one year in prison. They then were prohibited from living in the Northwestern, Southwestern, or Privislinsky Krais and placed under police supervision for five years.

Ūdra served his prison sentence at the Panevėžys Prison and was then exiled to Churapcha east of Yakutsk. He returned to Lithuania in 1902. He first lived in Suwałki and then returned to his native Garšviai where he collaborated with Juozas Tumas-Vaižgantas, who at the time served as a priest in Vadaktėliai and Sidabravas and edited Tėvynės sargas. Bružas was exiled to Olyokminsk. He briefly returned to Lithuania in 1902 and later lived in Russia. Kazanauskas and Labukas served their prison sentences in the Kresty Prison. Kazanauksas was exiled to Solvychegodsk and Arkhangelsk. Upon his return to Lithuania, he illegally tutored children in Lithuanian. Labukas was exiled to Yaransk and returned to Lithuania in 1900 where he worked as a tailor. Domarkas was sent to the Pskov Governorate. He returned to Lithuania in 1902 and lived in Židikai until his death.

==== Further arrests ====
Juozas Sakalauskas visited Garšviai in spring 1896. The police, informed by neighbor Škutas, arrived to investigate. Sakalauskas escaped, but his horses led the police to his home in Viduklė. He was arrested and sentenced to three years of exile in Mogilev. He returned to Lithuania in 1899 and continued book smuggling – even after the Lithuanian press ban was lifted in 1904, he continued to traffic in anti-government revolutionary texts.

After these arrests, the society was liquidated though individual members continued book smuggling activities. Jurgis Bielinis successfully evaded capture and gained a reputation of a folk hero for his ability to outsmart the police.

=== Summary of confiscated publications ===
Publications confiscated by the police from the Garšviai Society
Date (O.S.)	Circumstances	Books	Periodicals	Images	Total	Of them anti-Tsarist
4 February 1894	Bielinis, Bružas, Ūdra stopped on the road near Raseiniai	2,068 (approx.)	2,000 (approx.)		4,068	2,000
14 April 1894	Ūdra's neighbor turned in two packages to the police	468	130		598	130
7 June 1894	Police search of Ūdra's home in Garšviai	80	497	336	913	500
9 November 1894	Police search of Bružas' home in Zaltriškiai	1,254	481		1,735	959
6 April 1895	Prussian police caught Andrius Bielinis and handed over to the Russians	1,278	1,179	297	2,754	1,709
13 June 1895	Ūdra stopped on the road from Anykščiai to Troškūnai	1		166	167	1
23 June 1895	Police search of Ūdra's home in Garšviai	7		803	810	1
Total		5,156	4,287	1,602	11,045	5,300

== Bibliography ==
- Misius, Kazys; Kaluškevičius, Benjaminas (2006). Didysis knygnešys Jurgis Bielinis (in Lithuanian). Vilnius: Diemedis. ISBN 9986231310.
- Tyla, Antanas (1991). Garšvių knygnešių draugija (in Lithuanian). Vilnius: Mintis. ISBN 5-417-00475-8.
