= Yaransky =

Yaransky (masculine), Yaranskaya (feminine), or Yaranskoye (neuter) may refer to:

- Yaransky District, a district of Kirov Oblast, Russia
- Yaranskoye Urban Settlement, a municipal formation which the Town of Yaransk in Yaransky District of Kirov Oblast, Russia is incorporated as
