= Klochki =

Klochki (Russian: Клочки) is the name of several rural localities and villages in Russia:

- Klochki, Altai Krai, a selo in Klochkovsky Selsoviet of Rebrikhinsky District of Altai Krai
- Klochki, Kirov Oblast, a village in Kugalsky Rural Okrug of Yaransky District of Kirov Oblast
- Klochki, Tambov Oblast, a village in Sestrenovsky Selsoviet of Petrovsky District of Tambov Oblast
