= Vytautas Alantas =

Lithuanian writer and journalist

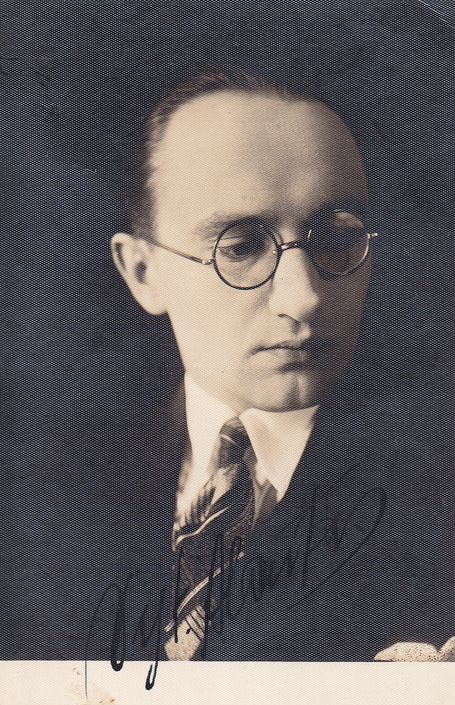
- Photo of Alantas in 1931 with his signature
- Born: Vytautas Benjaminas Jakševičius; 18 June 1902; Sidabravas, Kovno Governorate, Russian Empire
- Died: 24 April 1990 (aged 87); Detroit, United States
- Resting place: Petrašiūnai Cemetery (urn with ashes reburied in 1992)
- Education: University of Lithuania; University of Montpellier
- Occupations: Writer, journalist
- Notable work: Žygiuojanti tauta (The Marching Nation); Amžinasis lietuvis (The Eternal Lithuanian); Tauta istorijos vingiais (The Nation Along the Twists of History)
- Political party: Lithuanian Nationalist Union
- Board member of: Lithuanian Journalists Association
- Spouses: Elena Petrikaitė-Alantienė; Irena Baleišytė-Alantienė
- Awards: Order of Vytautas the Great (1936); Order of the Three Stars (1939)

Vytautas Alantas (born Vytautas Benjaminas Jakševičius, 18 June 1902 – 24 April 1990) was a Lithuanian writer, journalist, and political ideologue. Educated in France, Alantas worked as a journalist of the Lithuanian news agency ELTA and chief editor of the official daily Lietuvos aidas. Alantas was one of the leaders of Young Tautininkai, an organization of radical young members of the Lithuanian Nationalist Union in the late 1930s – this movement is also known as Vairininkai after the political magazine Vairas. A sympathizer with national socialism, Alantas is considered to be one of the chief ideologues of totalitarian nationalism in interwar Lithuania. During the Nazi occupation of Lithuania, he participated in the Lithuanian Activist Front (LAF) and later emigrated to the United States where he dedicated his life to literary work. He was a prolific writer and published seven collections of short stories, six novels, fifteen plays, four non-fiction books, and one poetry collection. His writings primarily deal with patriotic themes and topics.

== Biography ==
=== Early life and career ===
Alantas was the eldest of four children of a family of Lithuanian farmers in Sidabravas. Alantas' father briefly worked in the United States and managed to purchase 80 hectares (200 acres) of land from a former manor in Kriaukėnai near Radviliškis. His brother Algirdas Jakševičius became a theater director. Alantas was taught by a daraktorius, a travelling Lithuanian teacher educating pupils in secret during the Lithuanian press ban. In 1912–1923, Alantas studied at the Šiauliai Gymnasium, with a half-year break in 1919 when he volunteered for the Lithuanian Army to fight the West Russian Volunteer Army in the Lithuanian Wars of Independence, despite being only 17 years old. From sixth grade onward, Alantas became immersed in literature, writing poetry and participating in the activities of the Ateitis Catholic Youth organization. Like many Lithuanian writers, he published his literature under a pseudonym, choosing Alantas, a tributary of the river Minija.

In 1923, he enrolled to study literature in the University of Lithuania, but quit a year later due to lack of funds, and worked as a teacher at a gymnasium in Plungė until 1926. He continued his studies at the University of Montpellier in France and graduated in 1929. Because of his knowledge of French, he worked as the chief of the French section of ELTA from 1930 to 1934. In 1934–1939, he worked as the chief editor of the state newspaper Lietuvos aidas, and officially changed his last name to Alantas in 1937. He was awarded the Order of Vytautas the Great (1936) and the Order of the Three Stars (1939).

=== Vairininkai ideologue ===
In the late 1930s, Vairininkai took control of the media and the party apparatus in Antanas Smetona's dictatorship – party newspapers such as Vairas, Akademikas and Lietuvos aidas were chaired by the radical youth, while the general secretary of the Nationalist Union Jonas Statkus and the chairman Domas Cesevičius supported their ideas. They were unaligned with earlier extremist Lithuanian movements such as Voldemarininkai and presented themselves as an "opposition of goodwill". The Vairininkai were anti-semitic, anti-democratic, anti-communist, totalitarian and sympathized with National Socialism. They believed all political parties to be a hurdle towards creating a monolithic state with an unquestioned absolute leader at the top (cf. Führerprinzip) and saw democracy, in Alantas's words, as a "psychosis" which the young generation should rid itself of.

Alantas openly expressed extremist views arguing for aggressive nationalism without compromises. For example, he published an article in Vairas arguing in favor of an ethnic cleansing in the Vilnius Region after it was returned to Lithuania according to the terms of the Soviet–Lithuanian Mutual Assistance Treaty – he cited Nazi Germany as an example writing that "the Germans turned the city of Gdynia into the most German city in their country through a fully mechanical process – people were moved out and other people were moved in". Alantas published selected articles and texts in his book Žygiuojanti tauta (The Marching Nation), published in 1940. It was an apologetic work that defended the authoritarian regime of Smetona. He denounced international cooperation in favor of isolationist policies, and believed that national egoism, based on national solidarity, was the key to nations' survival. He believed that one's nation was superior and above others, and that citizens should sacrifice for their country (and not that a country should sacrifice for its citizens).

=== World War II and postwar life ===
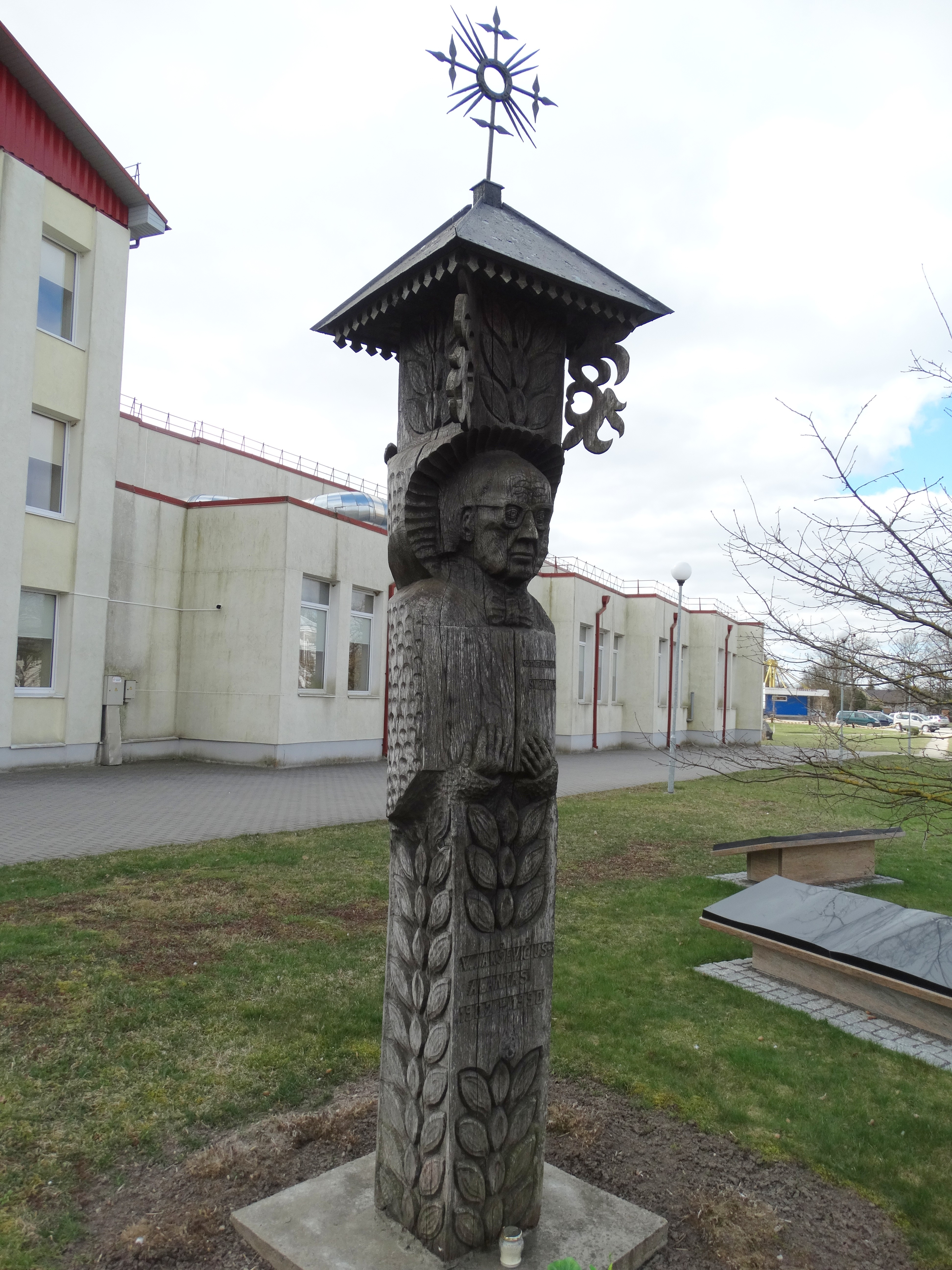
A monument to Alantas in his native Sidabravas

After the Soviet occupation of Lithuania in June 1940, Alantas fled to Germany. His wife and son remained in Lithuania and were deported to Siberia during the June deportation in 1941. In Germany, he was invited to head the Commission of Culture of the Lithuanian Activist Front, a movement of Lithuanian exiles who sought to liberate Lithuania with Nazi German support. Alantas belonged to the radical right wing of the LAF and supported establishment of the Lithuanian National Socialist Party. Despite being offered by Pranas Germantas to head the Commission of Culture in the Ministry of Education in the Provisional Government of Lithuania, his appointment was blocked by the Party of Lithuanian Nationalists and he was appointed as the head of Vilnius Drama Theatre instead. During three years of work, Alantas wrote three plays, two of which were staged. In 1944, Alantas fled to Germany from the approaching Soviet army and became a displaced person in the aftermath of World War II. In 1949, Alantas moved to Detroit, United States, where he worked as a low-wage labourer in a Ford Motors automobile factory until retirement in 1968. His four-act comedy Ragučio šaltinėlis, written in 1948 as a displaced person in Ulm and Flanders, premiered in Detroit in 1951. He knew French and German, but struggled with English. He dedicated the rest of his life to literary work and published several novels, short stories, and a poetry collection. He was chairman of the Lithuanian Journalists Association in 1967–1971, and was offered jobs editing Lithuanian periodicals but he refused.

In exile, Alantas's views grew increasingly esoteric and are exemplified in his first novel Pragaro pošvaistės (Patches of Hell). Searching for a psychological refuge, he began glorifying Baltic paganism and pre-Christian Lithuanian culture and denounced Christianity as a foreign, imposed influence. He equated Lithuanian national ideology with a return towards pagan humanism, and championed a worldview in which Lithuanians would recognize only Praamžius, the chief god of Baltic paganism, in the metaphysical, humane solidarity between fellow Lithuanians in the moral, and the principle "kill your enemy if you're able, perish yourself if you're not" in the political prism. In emigration, Alantas published two non-fiction books. In 1976, he wrote a study on Romas Kalanta who self-immolated in Kaunas protesting the Soviet regime in 1972. He wrote Tauta istorijos vingiais (The Nation Along the Twists of History) in 1987 and published it in 1990. It contains thoughts on the survival of the small nation, national character and identity of Lithuanians, meaning and value of the anti-Soviet resistance by the Lithuanian partisans. The work was republished in independent Lithuania in 1992. That year, the Ministry of Culture and Education proposed to include the book in the history curriculum for the 12th grade, but the proposal was quickly dropped.

== Literary works ==
He was a prolific writer and published seven collections of short stories, fifteen plays, six novels, four non-fiction books, and one poetry collection. He authored more than a hundred short stories and feuilletons that varied in themes and topics. He did not join any literary movement or circles. His works have features of realism and romanticism with schematic writing style that resembles journalist's work. They often include melodramatic love stories and declarations of patriotism.

His first short story was published in the Ateitis magazine in 1923. His first two collections of short stories, Artisto širdis (The Heart of an Artist) and Tarp penkių ir septynių (Between Five and Seven), were published in 1931 and 1934. The stories showed influence of Oscar Wilde and mostly dealt with city residents and their shortcomings – a move away from the traditional Lithuanian literature that primarily dealt with the lives of the Lithuanian village. Two other collections, Ant siūbuojančios žemės (On the Swaying Earth) and Svetimos pagairės (Foreign Skies), were published in the post-war years (1946 and 1954) and deal with the lives of Lithuanian refugees and emigrants, anti-Soviet resistance in Lithuania, etc. He published another collection Nemunas teka per Atlantą (Neman Flows Through the Atlantic) in 1970 that included stories concerning the history of Lithuania. The best short stories were published in Atspindžiai ūkanose (Reflections in the Mist) in 1976. In 1984, he published Gelmių balsai (Voices of the Deep), a collection of six short stories that won Lithuanian literary contests.

Alantas' first play Užtvanka (The Dam) was staged in 1932 and received critical acclaim. It dealt with a love story in the background of electrification. The second play, Gaisras Lietuvoje (Fire in Lithuania), was staged in 1933. It invited to burn down the shacks and their heritage of Russian oppression to make way for the new Lithuania. Due to its political undertones, the play was discontinued after two performances. As a director of the Vilnius Drama Theatre, he staged two comedies Gyvenimas iš naujo (Life Anew) and Buhalterijos klaida (A Bookkeeping Error). As a displaced person in post-war Germany, Alantas wrote a more serious drama Aukštadvaris which dealt with love and duty and which premiered in Australia in 1955. He wrote more plays while living in Detroit; those were mainly comedies that were staged by two amateur Lithuanian theaters. A collection of nine plays was published in Chicago in 1963. It included Aukštadvaris, three dramas about the desperate struggles of the anti-Soviet Lithuanian partisans, and five comedies that dealt with larger moral issues (e.g. choosing money over love or patriotic duty).

Alantas started his first novel Pragaro pošvaistės (In the Glow of Hell) in Lithuania, finished it in Detroit, and published it in West Germany in 1951. The work sparked lengthy discussions in Lithuanian literary circles – some 80 reviews and commentaries were collected and published in 1971 as a separate book. The novel deals with four patriots who fight the Nazi occupation in Vilnius, but the controversy was caused by the main character and his position that Lithuanians should return to the Lithuanian mythology and denounce Christianity. As a literary work, the novel was criticized for its schematic and lifeless characters. His second novel Tarp dviejų gyvenimų (Between Two Lives) was published in 1960 and was the first lengthy work to deal with the anti-Soviet Lithuanian partisans, highlighting their sacrifices and heroism. Alantas' third novel Amžinasis lietuvis (The Eternal Lithuanian; 1972) has autobiographical features (the main character is a writer who works at an automobile factory) and deals with the Lithuanian diaspora and their struggles to preserve their language and culture. The main character draws strength from the heroic history of Lithuania and pre-Christian Lithuanian paganism. This time, the work was criticized not for anti-Christian themes but due to heavy sexual content.

Alantas' largest work is the two-volume novel Šventaragis published in 1972 and 1974. It is a historical work that deals with the reign of King Mindaugas in the 13th-century Grand Duchy of Lithuania. The main character is the legendary Šventaragis (cf. Šventaragis Valley), a wise and determined defender of the pagan faith. The novel was republished in independent Lithuania in 1998. Alantas wrote his fifth novel Liepkalnio sodyba (Liepkalnis Homestead) in response to a contest held by the Union of Lithuanian Agronomists. Published in 1978, it depicts a raising family of Lithuanian farmers in the interwar period. His last novel Aušra Paliūnuose (Dawn in Paliūnai) was published in 1986 and depicts the publication of the first Lithuanian periodicals Aušra and Varpas during the Lithuanian National Revival.

Alantas started writing poetry in high school but published only one collection in 1982. The poems primarily deal with episodes from the history of Lithuania and express patriotic feelings: nine poems were dedicated to the Grand Dukes of Lithuania, three to Romas Kalanta, others to Vilnius, Trakai Island Castle, Raigardas Valley, his native Sidabravas.
