= Garšviai =

- Location of Garšviai in Lithuania
- Coordinates: 55°37′31″N 24°05′47″E
- Country: Lithuania
- County: Panevėžys County
- Municipality: Panevėžys District Municipality
- Eldership: Krekenava Eldership

Population (2011)
  - Total: 7
- Time zone: UTC+2 (EET)
  - Summer (DST): UTC+3 (EEST)

Garšviai is a village near Naujamiestis in Panevėžys District Municipality, Lithuania. According to the 2011 census, it had seven residents. It is known as the locations of the Garšviai Book Smuggling Society, one of the largest illegal societies of Lithuanian book smugglers during the Lithuanian press ban. The society was active from about 1883 to 1895.
