= Sidabravas =

- Town
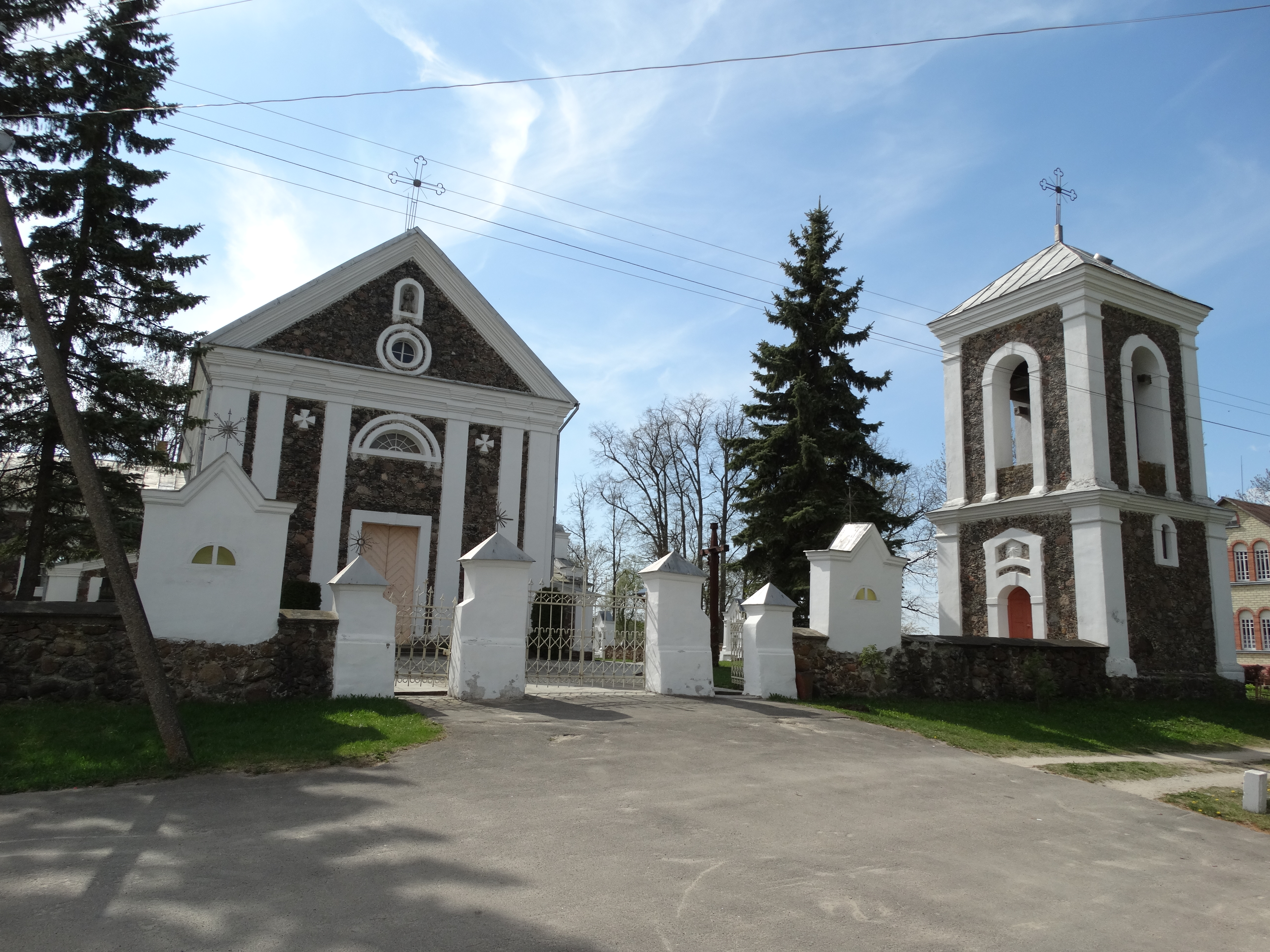
- Church of the Holy Trinity in Sidabravas

- Flag Coat of arms

- Location in Lithuania
- Coordinates: 55°41′50″N 23°55′40″E
- Country: Lithuania
- Ethnographic region: Samogitia
- County: Šiauliai County
- Municipality: Radviliškis district

Population (2011)
  - Total: 532
- Time zone: UTC+2 (EET)
  - Summer (DST): UTC+3 (EEST)

Sidabravas is a small town in Šiauliai County, Radviliškis district in northern-central Lithuania. As of 2011 it had a population of 532.

== History ==
The town was founded in 1829, when Matas Tracevskis, the owner of Rokoniai Manor, built the Church of the Holy Trinity on his land near the village of Miškiai, as the nearest churches in Šeduva and Naujamiestis were a too far away. After the church was completed, people began to build houses around it. At the end of the 19th century, it is mentioned as a village in Panevėžys County, belonging to Šeduva parish.

In 1999, the coat of arms and the flag of Sidabravas were introduced by the Decree of the President of the Republic of Lithuania.
