= Daujėnai =

- Town
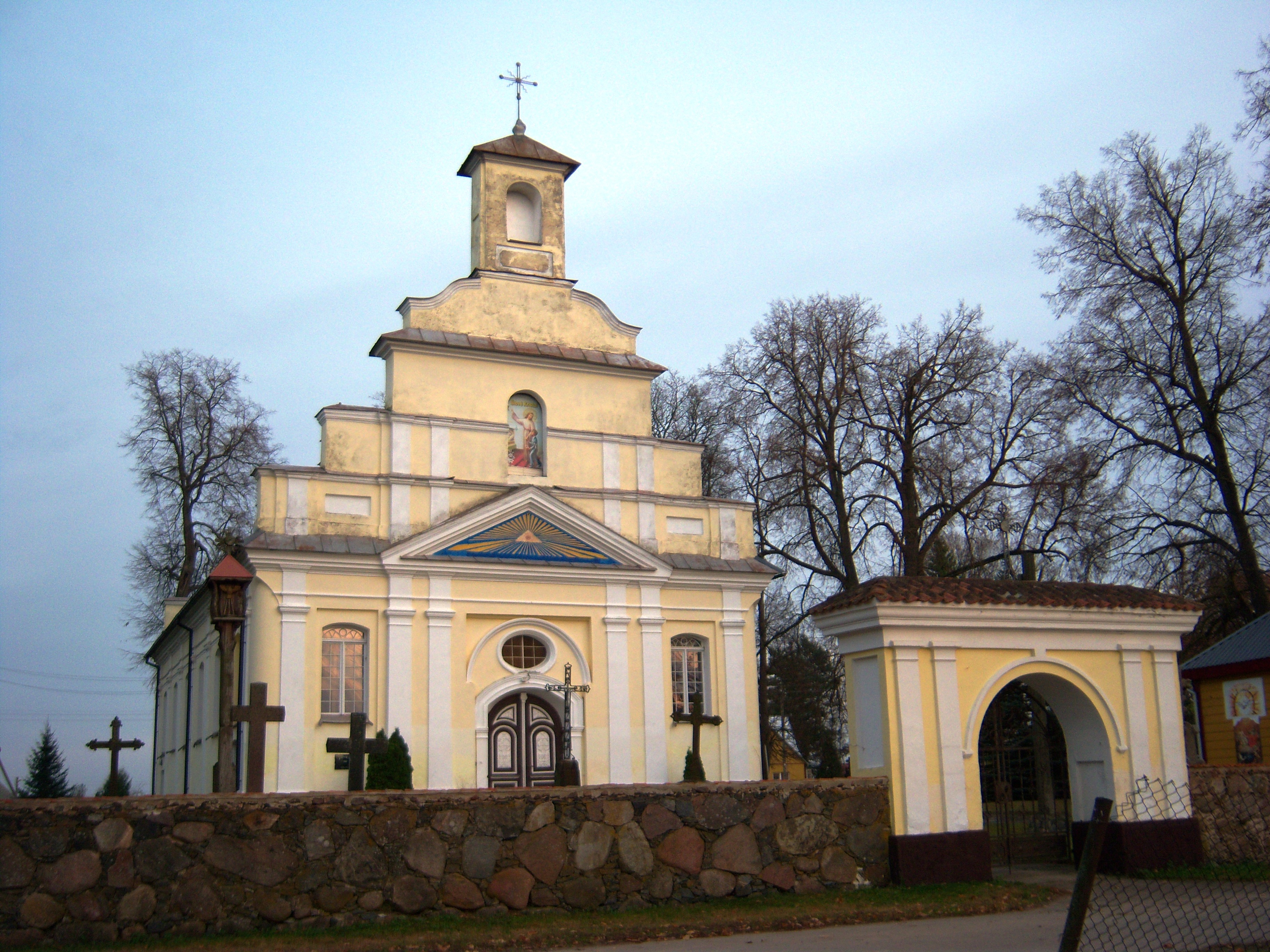
- Daujėnai Church of the Holy Name of Jesus, built in 1803

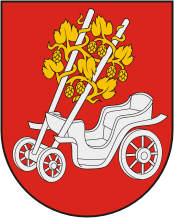
- Coat of arms

- Location within Lithuania
- Coordinates: 55°58′30″N 24°31′10″E
- Country: Lithuania
- County: Panevėžys County

Population (2011)
  - Total: 423
- Time zone: UTC+2 (EET)
  - Summer (DST): UTC+3 (EEST)

Daujėnai is a small town in Panevėžys County, in northeastern Lithuania. According to the 2011 census, the town has a population of 423 people. On 19 March 2004, the President of the Republic of Lithuania, Valdas Adamkus, formally approved the coat of arms of Daujėnai by decree. The coat of arms symbolises the legend of the town's name.

== Etymology ==
The name of the town Daujėnai is of eponymic origin, derived from the given name Daujėnas.

Local legend suggests a different version. During the periods when many people gathered in the town for pilgrimages and fairs, in order to accommodate all the carriages, it was customary to release the horses and raise the carriage drawbars. In turn, the name Daujėnai is traditionally attributed to the phrase "daug ienų", which translates as "many drawbars".

In other languages the town's name is translated as: Polish: Dowiany.
