= Siberian languages =

Siberian languages may refer to any languages spoken in Siberia, including:

- Eskaleut languages, spoken in northeastern Siberia
- Chukotko-Kamchatkan languages, spoken in Chukotka and Kamchatka
- Siberian Finnish
- Siberian dialects of Russian, and other Russian dialects spoken in Siberia
- Ainu languages, spoken in Sakhalin, the Kuril Islands, and the southern tip of Kamchatka
- Mongolic languages, spoken in Siberia
- Nivkh languages, spoken in Siberia
- Paleosiberian languages, several linguistic isolates and small families
- Turkic languages, spoken in Siberia
  - Siberian Turkic languages, a branch of Turkic
- Tungusic languages, spoken in northern and eastern Siberia
- Uralic languages, spoken in northwestern Siberia
  - Ob-Ugric languages, a branch of Uralic
  - Samoyedic languages, a branch of Uralic
- Yeniseian languages, spoken in central Siberia
- Yukaghir languages, spoken in northeastern Siberia
- One of several Siberian language isolates, like Nivkh
