= Klochki, Altai Krai =

- Locality
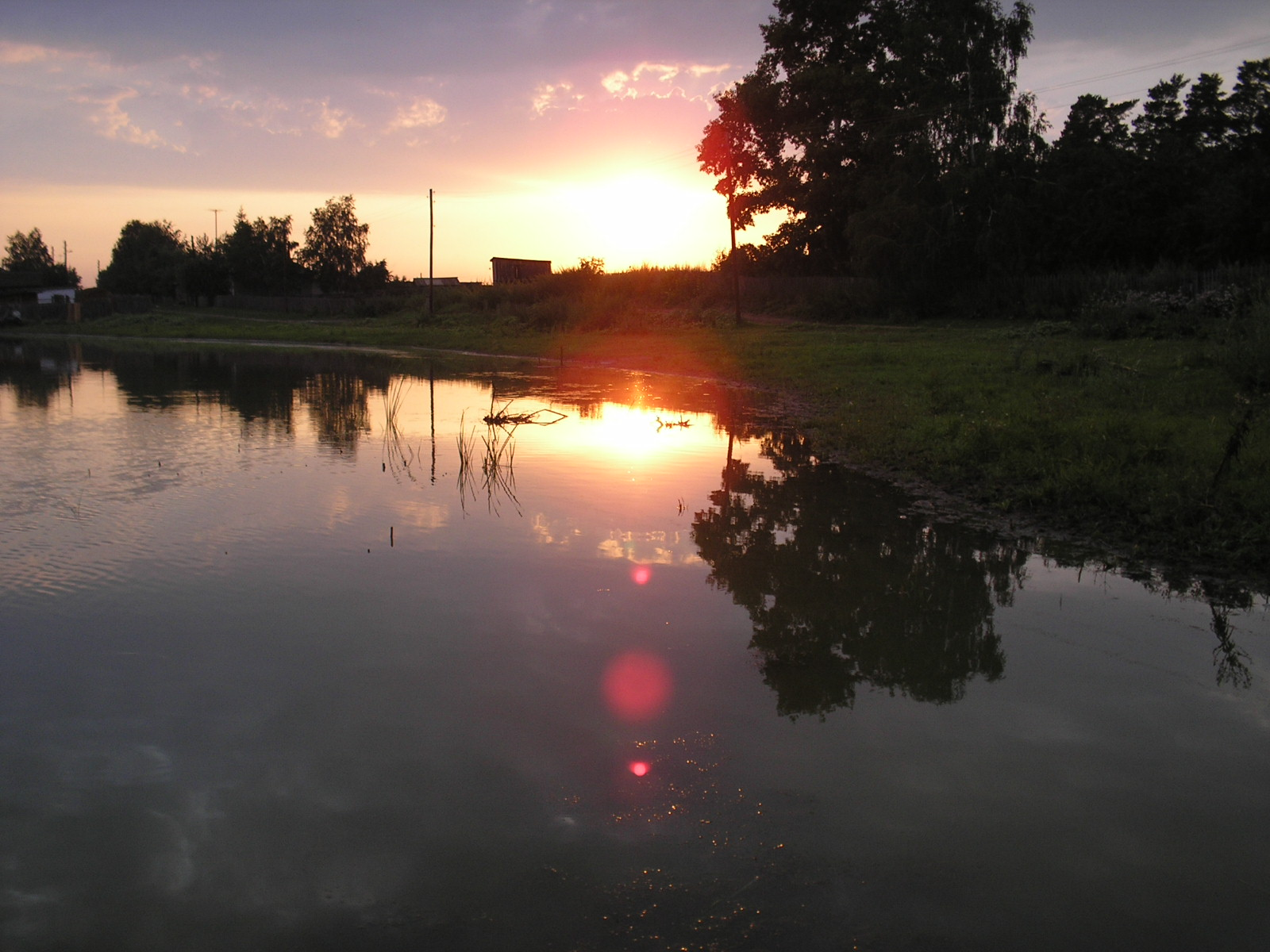
- The Borovlyanka River in Klochki
- Interactive map of Klochki, Altai Krai
- Coordinates: 53°10′52″N 82°34′43″E

Klochki (Russian: Клочки) is a rural locality (a selo) in Rebrikhinsky District of Altai Krai, Russia. The population of the area is 1,105 from the 2009 estimate.
