= Yaransky District =

Yaransky District Яранский район (Russian)
- District
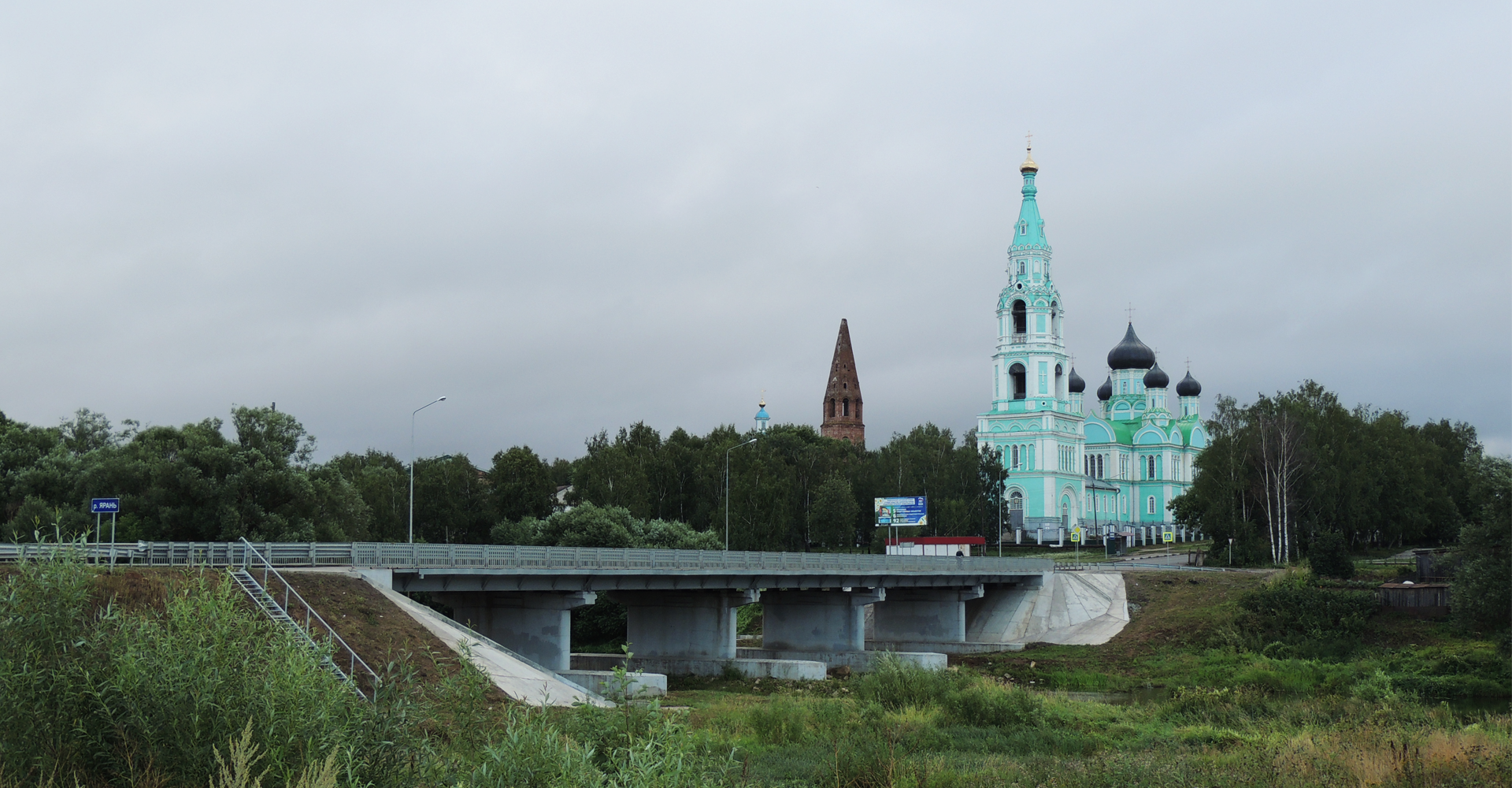
- Trinity Cathedral, Yaransk, Yaransky District

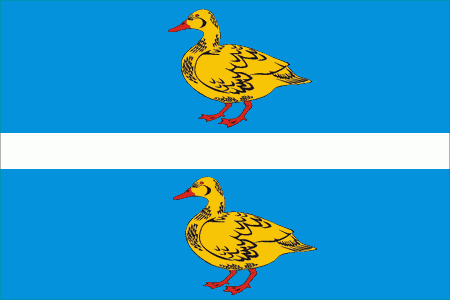
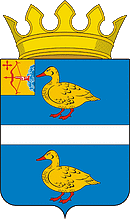
- Flag Coat of arms
- Location of Yaransky District in Kirov Oblast
- Coordinates: 57°18′N 47°53′E
- Country: Russia
- Federal subject: Kirov Oblast
- Established: 14 July 1929
- Administrative center: Yaransk

Area
  - Total: 2,420 km^{2} (930 sq mi)

Population (2010 Census)
  - Total: 26,899
  - Density: 11.1/km^{2} (28.8/sq mi)
  - Urban: 64.1%
  - Rural: 35.9%

Administrative structure
  - Administrative divisions: 1 Towns, 9 Rural okrugs
  - Inhabited localities: 1 cities/towns, 169 rural localities

Municipal structure
  - Municipally incorporated as: Yaransky Municipal District
  - Municipal divisions: 1 urban settlements, 9 rural settlements
- Time zone: UTC+3 (MSK)
- OKTMO ID: 33650000
- Website: http://mo-yaransk.ru/

Yaransky District (Russian: Яра́нский райо́н) is an administrative and municipal district (raion), one of the thirty-nine in Kirov Oblast, Russia. It is located in the southwest of the oblast. The area of the district is 2,420 square kilometers (930 sq mi). Its administrative center is the town of Yaransk. Population: 26,899 (2010 census); 33,682 (2002 Census); 37,253 (1989 Soviet census). The population of Yaransk accounts for 64.1% of the district's total population.
