= Yaransk =

Town in Kirov Oblast, Russia

Yaransk Яранск
- Town
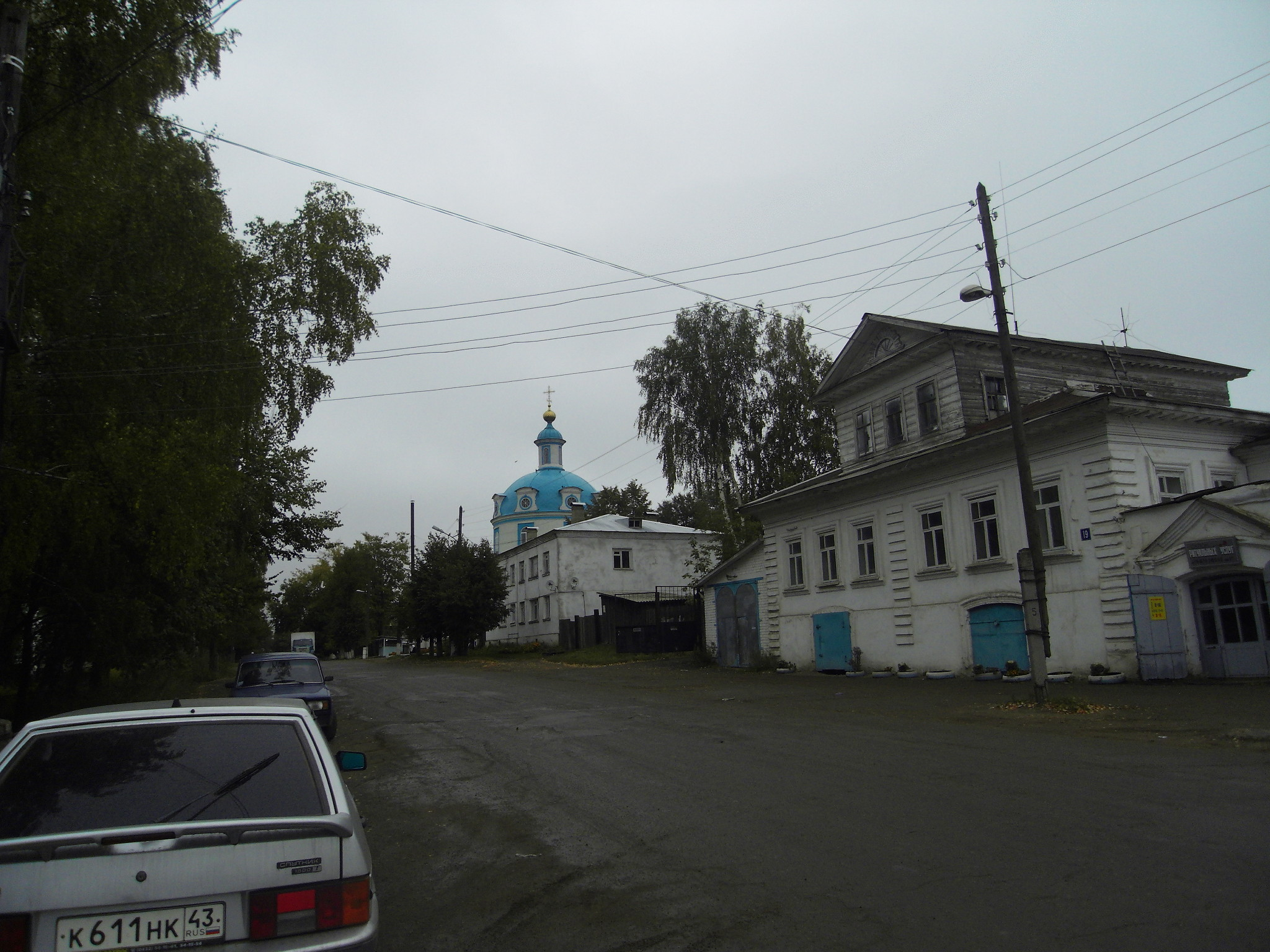
- Karla Marksa Street in Yaransk

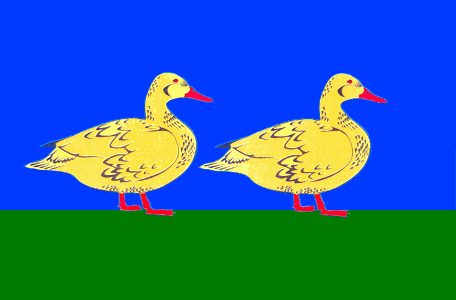
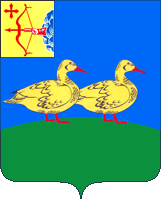
- Flag Coat of arms
- Interactive map of Yaransk
- Location of Yaransk Yaransk (Kirov Oblast)
- Coordinates: 57°19′N 47°54′E
- Country: Russia
- Federal subject: Kirov Oblast
- Administrative district: Yaransky District
- TownSelsoviet: Yaransk
- Founded: 1584
- Town status since: 1780
- Elevation: 120 m (390 ft)

Population (2010 Census)
  - Total: 17,253
  - Estimate (2021): 14,284 (−17.2%)

Administrative status
  - Capital of: Yaransky District, Town of Yaransk

Municipal status
  - Municipal district: Yaransky Municipal District
  - Urban settlement: Yaranskoye Urban Settlement
  - Capital of: Yaransky Municipal District, Yaranskoye Urban Settlement
- Time zone: UTC+3 (MSK)
- Postal codes: 612260–612263, 612269
- OKTMO ID: 33650101001

Yaransk (Russian: Яра́нск; Mari: Яраҥ, Yaraň) is a town and the administrative center of Yaransky District in Kirov Oblast, Russia, located on the Yaran River (Vyatka's basin), 257 kilometers (160 mi) southwest of Kirov, the administrative center of the oblast.

== History ==
In the Middle Ages, it had a central position in the land of Mari and served as the capital of the Mari people. In 1584, Yaransk was founded as a Russian fortress on the Yaran River where the old Mari fortress once stood to defend against the Mari. A posad later grew around the fortress. Town status was granted to Yaransk in 1780.

== Administrative and municipal status ==
Within the framework of administrative divisions, Yaransk serves as the administrative center of Yaransky District. As an administrative division, it is, together with eighteen rural localities, incorporated within Yaransky District as the Town of Yaransk. As a municipal division, the Town of Yaransk is incorporated within Yaransky Municipal District as Yaranskoye Urban Settlement.

== Population ==
Population: 17,253 (2010 census); 19,723 (2002 census); 20,466 (1989 Soviet census).
