= Naujamiestis, Panevėžys =

Naujamiestis
- Town
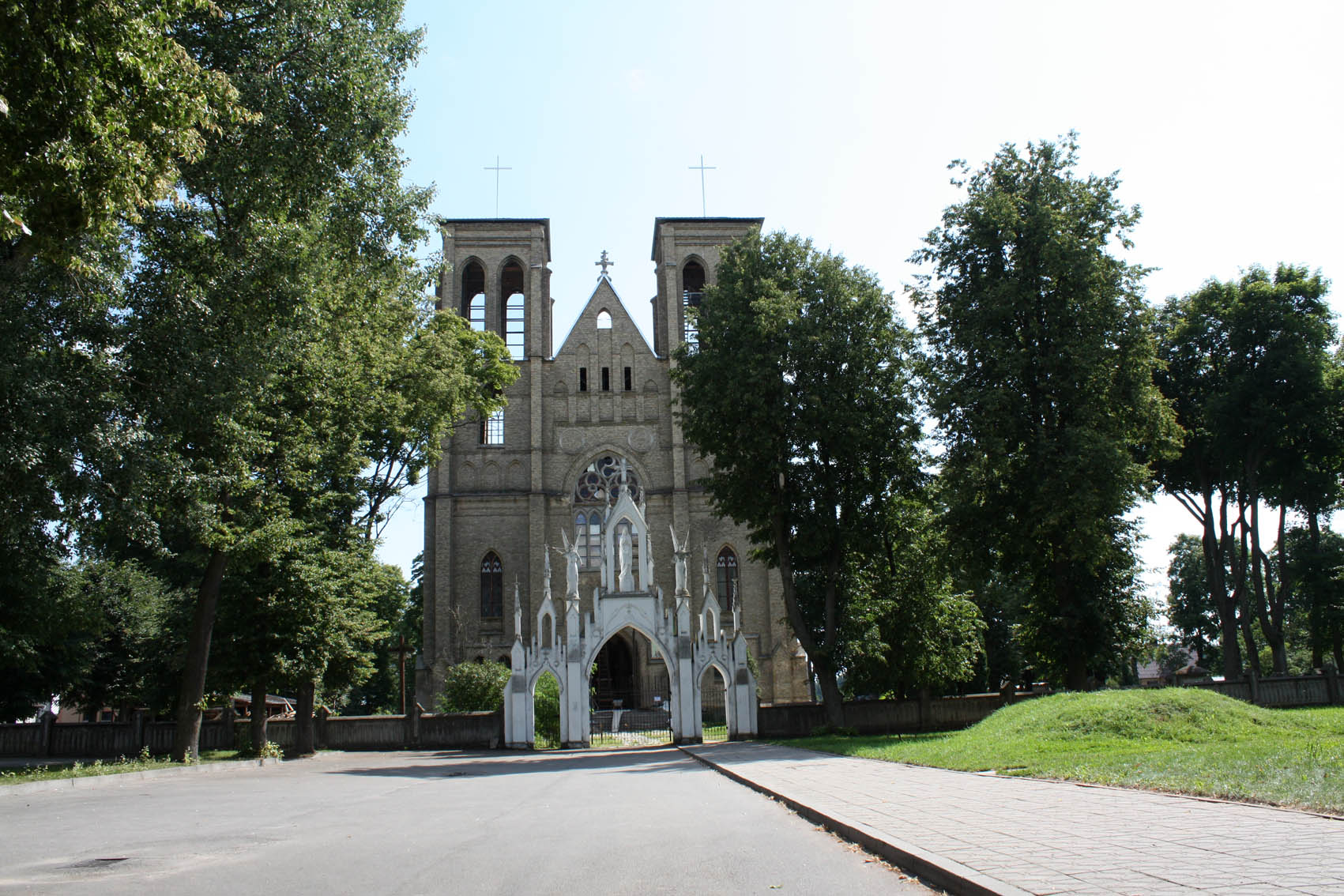

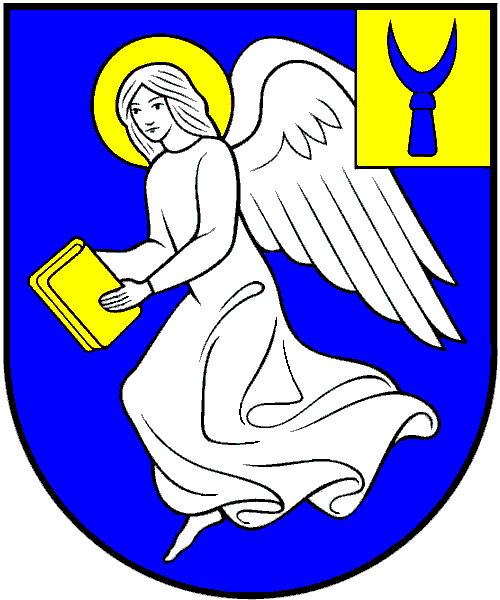
- Coat of arms

- Location within Lithuania
- Coordinates: 55°41′10″N 24°9′0″E
- Country: Lithuania
- County: Panevėžys County

Population (2011)
  - Total: 725
- Time zone: UTC+2 (EET)
  - Summer (DST): UTC+3 (EEST)

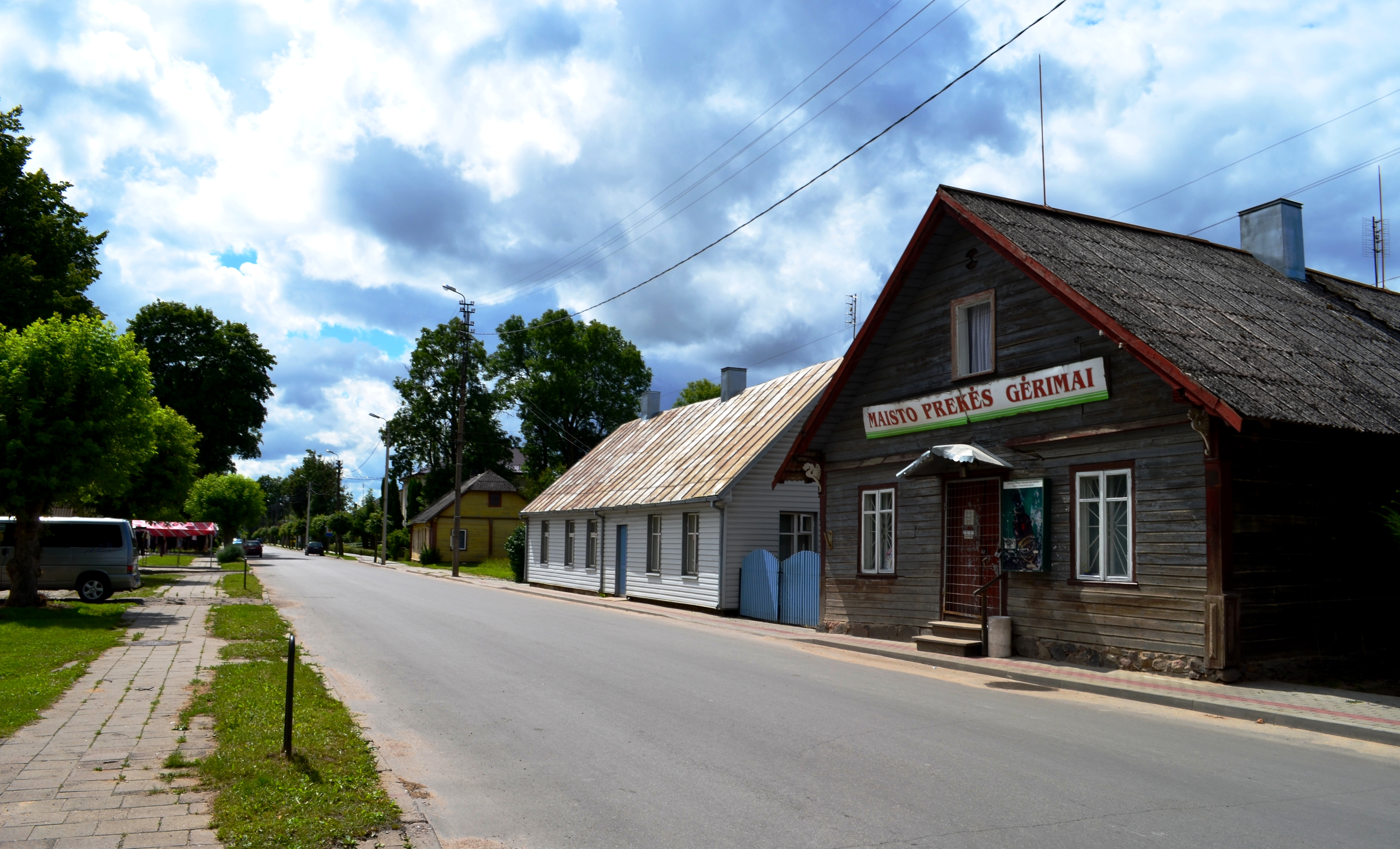
town center

Naujamiestis (literally "new town" in Lithuanian) is a small town in Panevėžys County, southwest of Panevėžys, on the right bank of Nevėžio, near a pine forest in northeastern Lithuania.

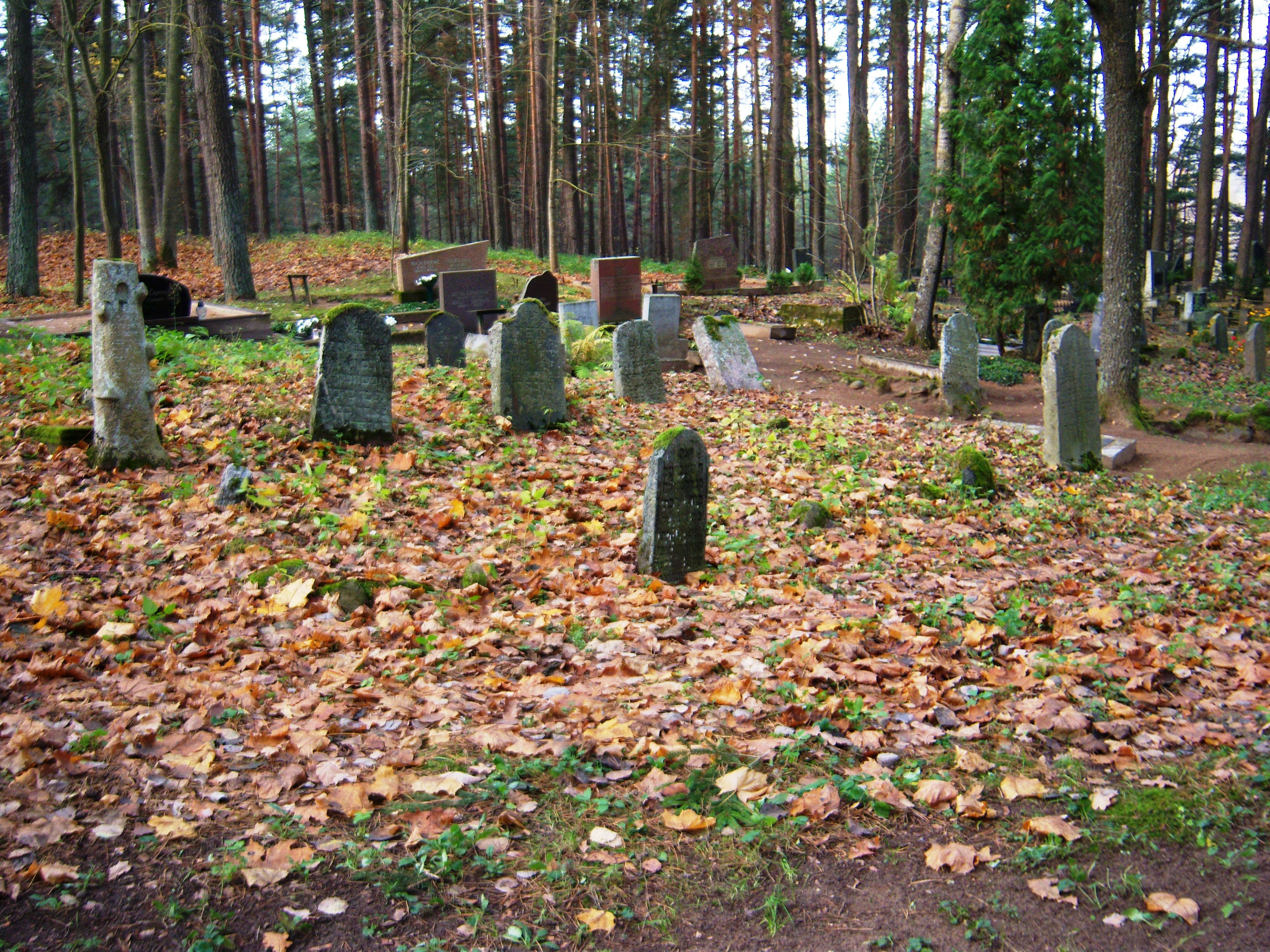
Karaite cemetery

The monument of K. Ulianskas of 1905-1907 stands in the old cemetery of Naujamiestis. for the victims of the revolution - "Angelas", the chapel-mausoleum of the Konkulevičius family. In the neighboring village of Naujamiestis there is a cemetery of the Karaites of Naujamiestis.

During the start of winter, the town creates large straw structures in the shapes of various animals, houses, and people. At the end of the festival, thousands of people gather for the ritualistic burning of the straw village.

According to the 2011 census, the town had a population of 725.

== History ==
Naujamiestis has been known since the 16th century. 2nd half. It is likely that during the time of Vytautas, the Karaim was stationed here as a guard unit serving Upytė Castle . 16th century Valavičiai were hosts in New Town. 16th century at the end of the year, a parochial school was established near the Evangelical Reformed Church, when in 1584 LDK chancellor E. Valavičius announced the mandatory education of children in the regulations of the Naujamiestis Manor . In the autumn, after finishing the field work, the peasants had to send their sons aged 8–15 to school. Parents were threatened with a fine for obstructing education. It was one of the first schools in Lithuania. Later, Naujamiestis was ruled by Radvilas, Oginskias, Karpias. in 1667 The Manor of Naujamiestis belonged to Duke Jonuš Radvila, Voivode of Vilnius (with 357 peasants). 18th century the school is mentioned again (it is not known whether it has been operating continuously since the end of the 16th century). 19th century Naujamiestis is a town in Panevėžys county, the center of the county. In 1958 May 15 New Town received the status of a city-type settlement. During the Soviet era, it was the central settlement of the economically strong collective farm of M. Melnikaitė, where a mechanical repair company and a dairy operated. A school public museum was established. In 1991 November 12 declared a town. Since 2006 cultural plein airs are held. In 2007 the church was badly burned. Both towers burned down, the Goebels organ built in 1813 in King's Landing was destroyed, windows with stained glass were broken, and the new roof collapsed. Along with one tower, a bell weighing a ton was rung into the church. In 2008 the coat of arms of Naujamiestis has been approved .

== Infrastructure ==
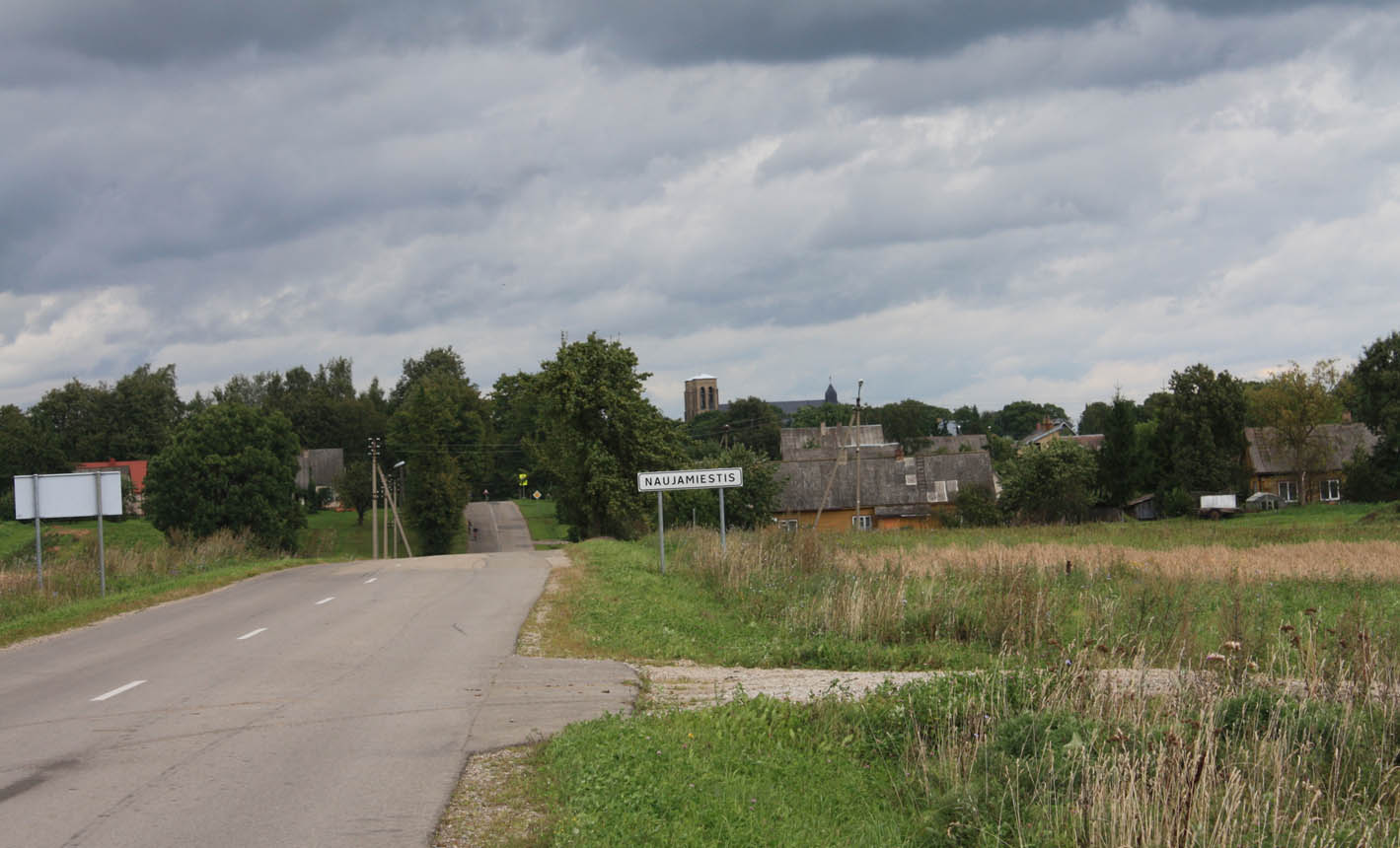
Town sign

- Church of St. Matthew the Apostle Evangelist (built in 1908),
- Naujamiestis High School (with a museum), music school, library (since 1948), nursery school,
- post office (LT-38049)
- cultural center (art gallery)
- nursing hospital and a dispensary a pharmacy
- a forestry company in Ragainė.
- an agricultural company.
- The Naujamiestis oak tree is protected.
