= Meilė Lukšienė =

Lithuanian university professor, cultural historian and activist

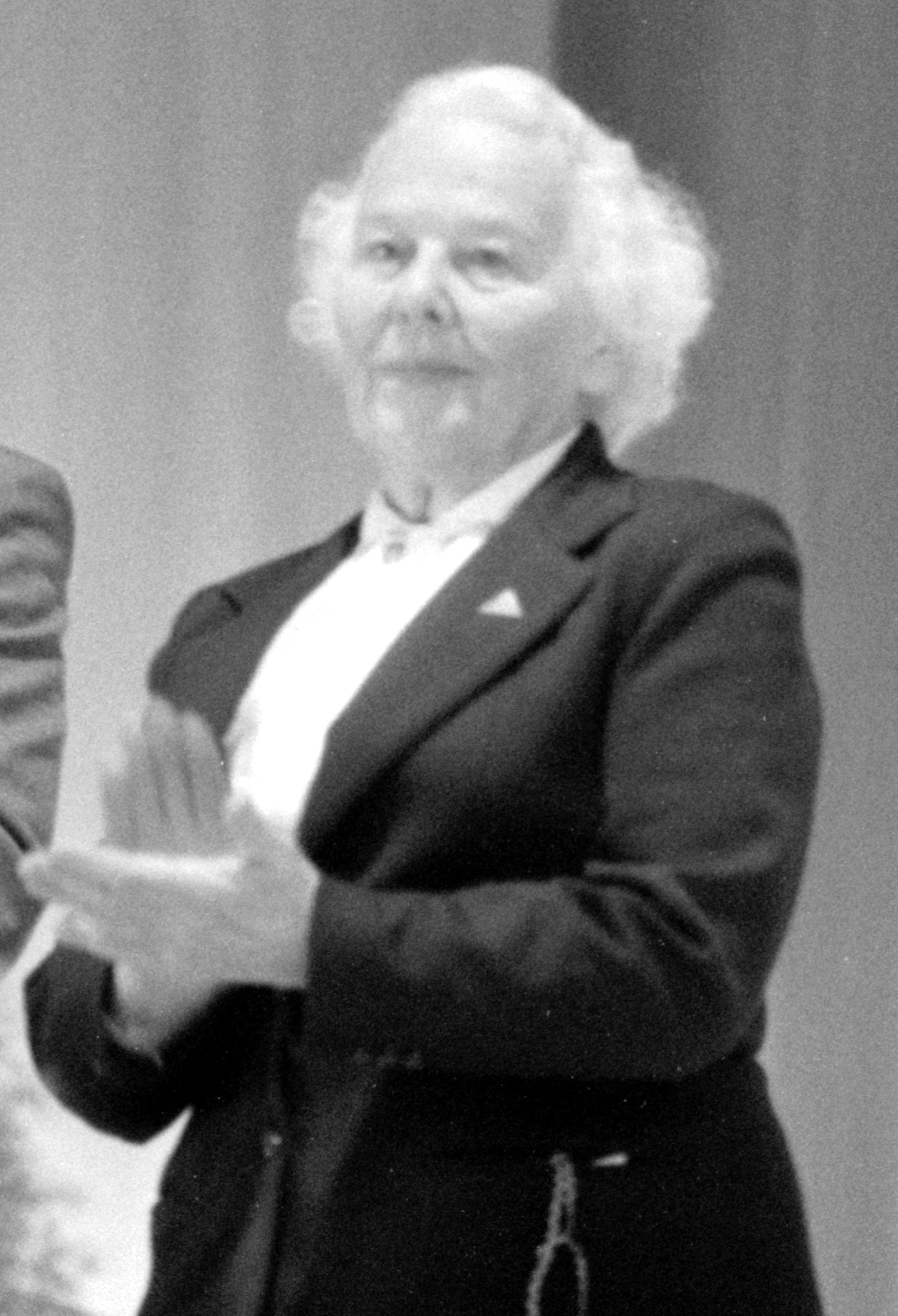
- Lukšienė during Sąjūdis meeting in 1988
- Born: 20 August 1913; Vienna, Austria-Hungary
- Died: 16 October 2009 (aged 96); Vilnius, Lithuania
- Other name: Meilutė Julija Matjošaitytė
- Education: Vytautas Magnus University
- Occupations: University professor, cultural historian
- Employer: Vilnius University
- Spouse: Kazimieras Lukša
- Children: Ingė Lukšaitė; Giedrė Lukšaitė-Mrázková; Rimtis Lukša
- Parent: Julija Biliūnienė
- Awards: Order of the Lithuanian Grand Duke Gediminas; Order of Vytautas the Great

Meilutė Julija Lukšienė née Matjošaitytė (20 August 1913 – 16 October 2009) was a Lithuanian university professor, cultural historian, and activist.

Educated at Vytautas Magnus University, Lukšienė became a professor of literature in 1944. In 1955, she defended her thesis on the works of Jonas Biliūnas to become the Candidate of Sciences. She headed the Lithuanian Literature Department of Vilnius University in 1951–1958. Due to tightening Soviet censorship after the Hungarian Revolution of 1956, the department was attacked for not devoting enough attention to communist literature and Lukšienė was dismissed from the university in early 1959. She then worked as a research fellow at the Institute of Pedagogy (merged into the Education Development Center) until retirement in 1997. She researched the history of education focusing on the 19th century. In 1988, she became one of the co-founders of Sąjūdis, a political organization which sought the independence of Lithuania from the Soviet Union. In the early 1990s, she worked on strategic documents outlining the needed education reform in Lithuania.

== Biography ==
=== Early life and education ===
Lukšienė was born on 20 August 1913 in Vienna. Her mother, Julija Biliūnienė, was a dentist and widow of the writer Jonas Biliūnas. During World War I, they retreated to Russia and for a while lived in Voronezh which had a large number of Lithuanian refugees. At that time, they became acquainted with Sofija Kymantaitė-Čiurlionienė and Pranas Mašiotas. In 1918, Lukšienė moved to Vilnius where her mother worked at the hospital of the Lithuanian Sanitary Aid Society. In 1924, Biliūnienė remarried to the educator Stasys Matijošaitis who adopted Lukšienė. Lukšienė grew up with her cousin archaeologist Marija Gimbutas who later cited Lukšienė as a formative influence.

Lukšienė studied at the Lithuanian Vilnius Vytautas Magnus Gymnasium. After her graduation in 1931, her mother decided to move from Vilnius (which was then part of the Second Polish Republic) to Kaunas in interwar Lithuania. Her father followed in 1933. She enrolled at the Vytautas Magnus University to study chemistry, but after a year switched to the Faculty of Humanities and majored in Lithuanian literature with minors in French language and literature and pedagogy. After graduating in 1938, Lukšienė worked as a teacher in gymnasiums in Kaunas and Vilnius.

=== Lithuanian SSR ===
After Lithuania was re-occupied by the Soviets in mid-1944, Lukšienė became a professor of literature and folklore at Kaunas University. In 1949, the Faculty of Humanities was transferred to Vilnius and Lukšienė became a professor at Vilnius University. Her students included Justinas Marcinkevičius, Janina Degutytė, Judita Vaičiūnaitė, Tomas Venclova, and Juozas Aputis. She headed the Lithuanian Literature Department in 1951–1958. During this time, she worked on literary research and prepared collective works of Jonas Biliūnas (two volumes published in 1954–1955), Simonas Daukantas (1955), and Ludwik Adam Jucewicz (1959). In 1955, she defended her thesis on the works of Biliūnas to became the Candidate of Sciences.

After the Hungarian Revolution of 1956, Soviet authorities increased their ideological control of Vilnius University which saw some improvements under rector Juozas Bulavas during the Khrushchev Thaw. Bulavas was dismissed in June 1958. The Lithuanian Literature Department was attacked for spending too much effort on old literature and not enough on the new communist literature. Lukšienė was criticized for her monograph about Jonas Biliūnas (published in 1956) and articles included in the second volume of Biliūnas' works (published in 1955). She was dismissed as head of the department in 1958 and fired from the university in March 1959. The campaign continued until 1961 and resulted in the dismissals of professors Irena Kostkevičiūtė and Vanda Zaborskaitė and student Tomas Venclova.

Lukšienė then worked as a research fellow at the Institute of Pedagogy (merged into the Education Development Center) until retirement in 1997. She then switched her study focus from literature to the history of education. She studied the Commission of National Education (1773–1795) and education in the 19th century. She defended her thesis to become Doctor of Sciences in 1973.

=== Independent Lithuania ===
Lukšienė became a member of the initiative group that established the Reform Movement of Lithuania Sąjūdis in June 1988. It was a political organization that led the struggle for Lithuania's independence from the Soviet Union. Together with poet Justinas Marcinkevičius, she chaired the first session of Sąjūdis founding meeting on 22–23 October 1988.

Together with others, Lukšienė worked on the conceptual framework of the national education. She was also an unofficial advisor of Darius Kuolys, the first Lithuanian Minister of Culture and Education in 1990–1992. With others, she prepared and published Lietuvos švietimo koncepcija (Concept of Lithuanian Education) in 1992 and presented it to the government. However, the new government elected in fall 1992 did not adopt the plan. She continued to work on strategic documents regarding the education in Lithuania and was one of the co-authors of plans for educational reform (1993), general school curriculums (1994), and education standards (1997). The new education system was based on the principles of humanity, democracy, and nationality.

Lukšienė died on 16 October 2009 in Vilnius, at the age of 97. She was buried at the Saulė Cemetery in Antakalnis.

== Works ==
She prepared and annotated collective works of Jonas Biliūnas (two volumes published in 1954–1955, three volumes in 1981–1982), Simonas Daukantas (1955), and Ludwik Adam Jucewicz (1959, 1975). She published monographs on the works of Jonas Biliūnas (1956), history of education in Lithuania in the early 19th century (1970), and democratic education ideas in Lithuania from the late 18th to the early 19th centuries (1985). She was one of the coauthors of collective monographs on the history of Lithuanian literature (1957) and the history of education in Lithuania (1983).

She also published a number of articles on Lithuanian writers and history of education. A collection of her literary and historical articles was published by her daughter Ingė Lukšaitė in 2014. A collection of her articles on the education reforms in Lithuania in the 1990s was published in 2000.

In 2004, the Institute of Lithuanian Literature and Folklore published Laiko prasmės (The Meaning of Time) by Lukšienė. It contains memoirs by her mother Julija Biliūnienė and Lukšienė's reflections on the development of the mentality of the Lithuanian intelligentsia.

== Legacy ==
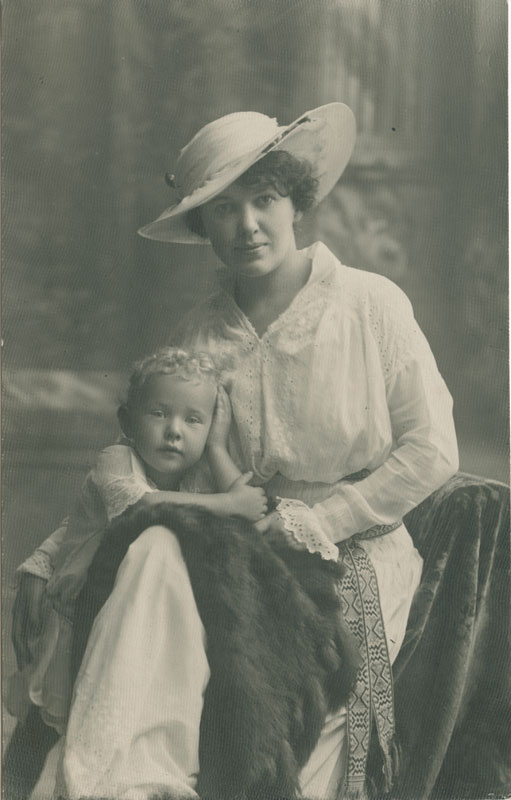
Lukšienė with her mother Julija Biliūnienė in 1917

Lukšienė's bibliography was published in 1989, 1998, 2013.

Her 100th birth anniversary in 2013 was celebrated by UNESCO. The Seimas (Lithuanian parliament) declared 2013 to be the year of Lukšienė. In October 2013, the gymnasium in Marijampolis was renamed after Lukšienė. In December 2022, the library of the Vytautas Magnus University Education Academy, which houses 2,125 books from Lukšienė's personal library, was renamed in her memory.

The Ministry of Education and Science established two awards named after Lukšienė: one in 2010 to school teachers and second in 2013 to university professors and academics.

== Family ==
In 1937, Lukšienė married economist and banker Kazimieras Lukša (1906–1983). They raised three children: historian Ingė Lukšaitė (born 1940), biologist Rimtis Lukša (born 1941), and organist Giedrė Lukšaitė-Mrázková (born 1944).

== Awards ==
Lukšienė received the following awards:

- 1994: Order of the Lithuanian Grand Duke Gediminas (Knight's Cross)
- 2003: Order of Vytautas the Great (Commander's Grand Cross)
- 2004: Comenius Medal by UNESCO for "her contribution to the development of a democratic society and a modern education system in Lithuania"
