= Alseika =

- Lithuanian surname
- m.: Alseika
- f.: (unmarried): Alseikaitė
- f.: (married): Alseikienė

Alseika is a Lithuanian surname. Notable people with the surname include:

- Danielius Alseika
- Liudas Alseika (1887–1960), Lithuanian traveler, Esperanto speaker, local lore enthusiast, pedagogue
- Veronika Alseikienė (1883–1971), the first female Lithuanian physician
- Marija Birutė Alseikaitė, birth name of Marija Gimbutas
