= Julija Biliūnienė =

Lithuanian dentist

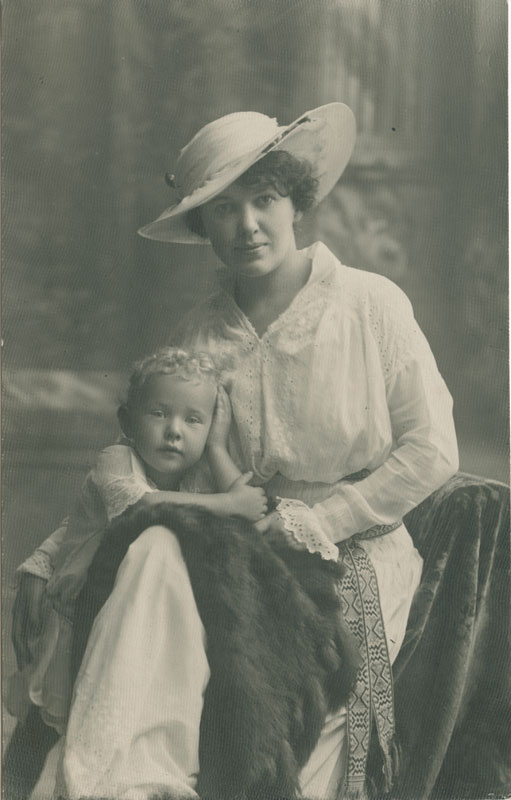
- Biliūnienė with her daughter in 1917
- Born: 1 September 1880; Malavėnai, Russian Empire
- Died: 8 April 1978 (aged 97); Vilnius, Lithuanian SSR
- Burial place: Petrašiūnai Cemetery
- Other names: Julija Janulaitytė; Julija Matjošaitienė
- Occupation: Dentist
- Spouse(s): Jonas Biliūnas; Stasys Matijošaitis
- Children: Meilė Lukšienė
- Relatives: Brother Augustinas Janulaitis; Sister Veronika Alseikienė

Julija Biliūnienė née Janulaitytė (1880–1978) was a Lithuanian dentist.

Educated at a three-year dental school in Šiauliai, Biliūnienė opened a private practice in Panevėžys in 1902. Caring for her terminally ill husband writer Jonas Biliūnas, she lived and worked in Zakopane. In 1911, she graduated from a two-year dental school in Paris. In 1918, she moved to Vilnius where she worked at the hospital of the Lithuanian Sanitary Aid Society. She moved to Kaunas in 1931 and was one of the co-founders of the Lithuanian Dentists' Society in 1934. During World War II, she helped hide five Jews for which she was awarded the Life Saving Cross in 2002.

== Biography ==
=== Early life and education ===
Julija Biliūnienė was born on 1 September 1880 in Malavėnai near Šiauliai, then part of the Russian Empire. The family had 13 children, nine of whom reached adulthood and five completed university education. Biliūnienė was the second youngest of her surviving siblings. Her siblings included a judge and professor Augustinas Janulaitis, Catholic priest Pranciškus Janulaitis, and ophthalmologist Veronika Alseikienė. Her father died when she was four years old.

She received her first education at home and did not attend a primary school. In 1895, she moved to Šiauliai to pursue education privately with the support of her elder brother Augustinas. There she helped store and distribute social democratic publications and joined a circle of Lithuanian intellectuals, including Povilas Višinskis and Liudas Vaineikis. In 1899, she enrolled at a three-year dental school in Šiauliai. At the same time, as an extramural student, she finished four classes at the newly established Šiauliai Girls' Gymnasium.

=== Marriage to Jonas Biliūnas ===
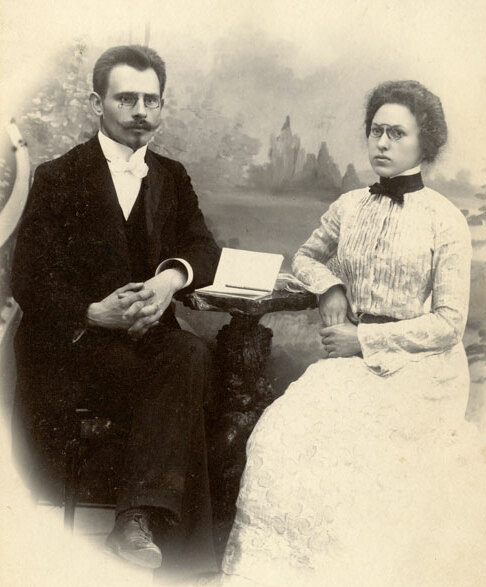
Biliūnienė with her husband after their wedding in 1904

In 1901, she became acquainted with and engaged to writer Jonas Biliūnas. The same year, she passed exams at the University of Kazan which allowed her to practice as a dental technician. She then further completed two-month dental courses in Vilnius and opened a private practice in Panevėžys in spring 1902. She passed gymnasium graduation exams at Mitau Gymnasium and dentistry exams at the University of Kharkiv in August 1904. This allowed her to practice as a dentist.

On 7 May 1904, Biliūnienė married Jonas Biliūnas who was already ill with tuberculosis. Up until his death in December 1907, Biliūnienė spent considerable efforts to support his medical treatments. In early 1905, she traveled to Zürich to care after him. They spent the summers of 1905 and 1906 in Lithuania. In early 1906, she travelled to Zakopane where Biliūnas was treated in a sanatorium. The couple struggled financially and accumulated debts. Biliūnienė started working as a dentist even though she was not authorized to practice in the Austrian Empire. She remained in Zakopane until fall 1909. During this time, she earned enough to repay her debts and save for further education.

=== Dentist career ===
In 1909, Biliūnienė enrolled at a two-year dental school in Paris. She received a diploma of dental surgeon in 1911. She moved to Zakopane and worked there until 1913. That year she gave birth to her daughter Meilė Lukšienė and moved to Vilnius. During World War I, she retreated to Russia. For some time, she worked as a dentist for the Lithuanian Society for the Relief of War Sufferers and had a private practice in Voronezh.

In 1918, Biliūnienė returned to Vilnius and joined the hospital of the Lithuanian Sanitary Aid Society which was chaired by her brother-in-law Danielius Alseika. In 1924, she remarried to educator and journalist Stasys Matijošaitis and they had one son Saulius. In 1931, when her daughter Meilė Lukšienė graduated from the Vilnius Vytautas Magnus Gymnasium and needed to continue university education, the family moved from Vilnius (then part of the Second Polish Republic) to Kaunas. Biliūnienė lived with her sister Veronika Alseikienė and their daughters Meilė Lukšienė and Marija Gimbutas had a formative influence on each other. In Kaunas, Biliūnienė had a private practice. She was one of the co-founders of the Lithuanian Dentists' Society (established in 1934) and for a time was its vice-chair. She also published articles about dentistry in medical publications.

=== Later life ===
During the German occupation of Lithuania, she used her office to hide two Jews until they found a safer place. She also hid three Jews in her home. For this, she was posthumously awarded the Life Saving Cross in 2002.

In the Lithuanian SSR, she could no longer have a private practice but continued to see patients (family and friends) until the age of 92. After Matijošaitis' death in 1949, she received widow's pension. She maintained contacts with remaining members of Lithuanian intelligentsia – families of sculptor Petras Rimša, painter Antanas Žmuidzinavičius, naturalist Tadas Ivanauskas, and writer Sofija Kymantaitė-Čiurlionienė. She also helped those who had returned from the Soviet Gulag, including Marcelė Kubiliūtė and Petronėlė Lastienė.

Biliūnienė died on 8 April 1978 in Vilnius and was buried in Petrašiūnai Cemetery next to her second husband.
