= Ingė Lukšaitė =

Lithuanian cultural historian

- Born: 2 February 1940 (age 86); Kaunas, Lithuania
- Education: Vilnius University
- Occupations: Cultural historian, university professor
- Parent(s): Meilė Lukšienė; Kazimieras Lukša
- Relatives: Sister Giedrė Lukšaitė-Mrázková
- Awards: Order of the Lithuanian Grand Duke Gediminas

Ingė Lukšaitė (born 1940) is a Lithuanian cultural historian and university professor. She specializes in the history of the Reformation in Lithuania. She worked at the Lithuanian Institute of History for over four decades.

== Biography ==
Lukšaitė was born on 2 February 1940 in Kaunas to the family of banker Kazimieras Lukša and cultural historian Meilė Lukšienė. She studied at the National M. K. Čiurlionis School of Art before enrolling at Vilnius University to study history. She graduated in 1962 and worked as a teacher in Trakų Vokė until 1964 when she became an aspirant (doctoral student) at the Lithuanian Institute of History.

She worked at the Lithuanian Institute of History from 1967 to her retirement in 2009. She also lectured at the Vilnius Academy of Arts (1985–1990), Vytautas Magnus University (1995–2002), and Vytautas Magnus University (2001–2007). From October 2003 to early 2008, she was deputy chair of the Research Council of Lithuania and coordinated the establishment of the Lithuanian research database Lituanistika in 2006–2008.

== Works ==
In total, Lukšaitė has published more than 180 works – books, academic articles, and other publications. Her bibliography was compiled and published in 2010.

In 1971, she defended her thesis on the Lithuanian language during the Reformation in the 17th century and became a Candidate of Sciences. The thesis was published as a separate book in 1970.

In 2000, she defended her monograph on the Reformation in the Grand Duchy of Lithuania and Lithuania Minor in the 16th and 17th centuries and was awarded Dr. habil. The monograph sold out quickly and Lukšaitė received the Lithuanian Science Award for the book. The monograph was translated to German in 2017. A shortened Lithuanian version for the general public was also published in 2017. In this work, Lukšienė did not follow Polish historiography and was the first to separate the Reformation in the Grand Duchy of Lithuania from the Reformation in Poland and link it to the Reformation in Lithuania Minor.

She also published monographs on the Lithuanian publicists on the issue of peasants (1976), radical trends of Reformation in Lithuania (1980), features of the Lithuanian cultural history (with Juozas Jurginis, 1981), 5th volume of the History of Lithuania covering 1529–1588 (with Jūratė Kiaupienė, 2013).

At the Lithuanian Institute of History, she headed the program on publishing historical Lithuanian texts in 1998–2009. She prepared several publications of historical sources, including an anthology of texts on the education in Lithuania in the 13th to 16th centuries (with others; 1994), selected works of Andreas Volanus (with Marcelinas Ročka; 1996), Deliciae Prussicae by Matthäus Prätorius (with others; 4 volumes in 1999–2011), and documents on the visitation of Lutheran churches in Klaipėda in 1676–1685 (2009).

Lukšaitė served on the editorial board of academic journals Lietuvos istorijos metraštis, Knygotyra, and book series Senoji lietuvių literatūra.

== Awards ==
Lukšienė received the following awards:

- 1997: Order of the Lithuanian Grand Duke Gediminas (Knight's Cross)
- 1999: Martynas Mažvydas Award
- 2002: Lithuanian Science Award
- 2017: Ludwig Rhesa Award
