= Marijampolis Eldership =

Marijampolis Eldership Marijampolio seniūnija
- Eldership
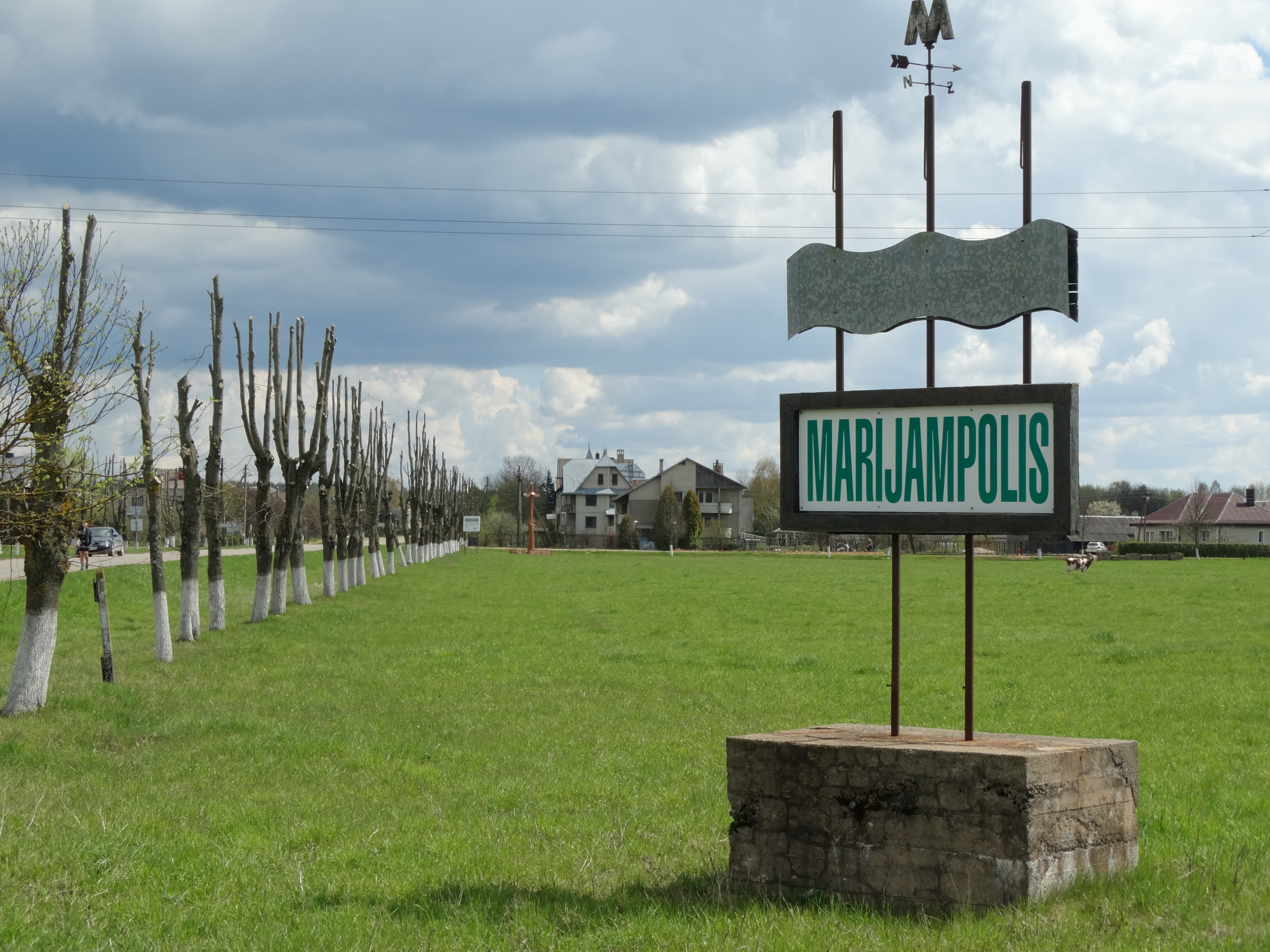

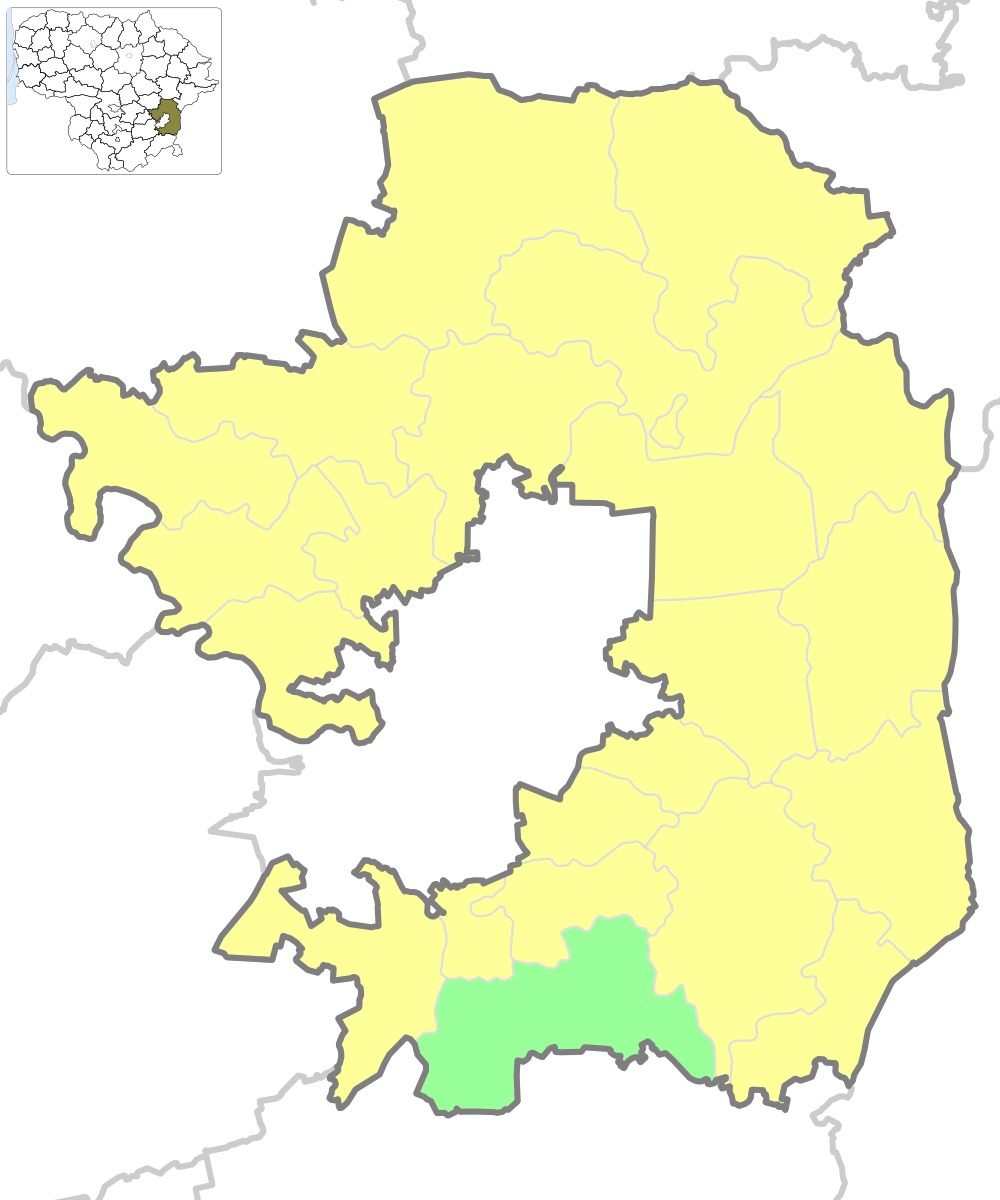
- Location of Marijampolis Eldership
- Country: Lithuania
- Ethnographic region: Dzūkija
- County: Vilnius County
- Municipality: Vilnius District Municipality
- Administrative centre: Marijampolis

Area
  - Total: 125 km^{2} (48 sq mi)

Population
  - Total: 3,481
  - Density: 27.8/km^{2} (72.1/sq mi)
- Time zone: UTC+2 (EET)
  - Summer (DST): UTC+3 (EEST)
- Website: https://www.vrsa.lt

Marijampolis Eldership (Lithuanian: Marijampolio seniūnija) is an eldership in Lithuania, located in Vilnius District Municipality, south of Vilnius.

== Ethnic composition ==
According to 2011 National Census data, the ethnic composition is as follows:

- Poles - 63%
- Lithuanians - 24%
- Russians - 9%
