= Achilleion (Thessaly) =

Neolithic site in Thessaly, Greece

Coordinates: 39.26396°N 22.43009°E

Achilleion is an early Neolithic site in Thessaly, Greece. It was partly excavated in the 1970s.

== Description ==
Achilleion is a stratified Early and Middle Neolithic tell of 200 x 260 m. Excavations were led by archaeologist Marija Gimbutas in cooperation with D. Theocharis and yielded valuable information on the mounds stratigraphy, chronology, settlement phases, architecture, material culture and environment. The Sesklo site is best known for the large number of figurines recovered at the site.

== Excavation ==
The excavation was funded by UCLA with additional support from the National Science Foundation, the Samuel H. Kress foundation and American INVS-Co. 40 american, greek and international students and scholars participated in the excavations, that proceeded in the months of August and September 1973 and 1974.

The site was investigaed through four trenches on the mound, supplemented by additional test trenches in the surrounding area. Its chronology has been divided into four phases with further subdivisions, based on gradual changes in architectural and ceramic styles. It covers the complete Sesklo sequence. The well-preserved material culture of Achilleion includes all find categories typical of Early Neolithic sites in Thessaly, such as pottery, bone tools, personal ornaments, and both ground and chipped stone tools. Particularly noteworthy is the large number of figurines. Specialised studies provided insights into archaobotany, dendrochronology and zooarchaeology.

One reviewer complained that “no geologic, geomorphologic, sedimentologic, or pedologic study was carried out – a serious failing”.

Excavations of the site ended before completion after only two excavation seasons. Gimbutas attributed the sudden halt of excavations to the political unrest caused by the Turkish invasion of Cyprus in July 1974.

== Sources ==
- Claude Björk. Early pottery in Greece: a technological and functional analysis of the evidence from neolithic Achilleion, Thessaly. Jonsered, Sweden: P. Åströms V., 1995.
- Marija Gimbutas, Shan Winn, & Daniel Shimabuku, eds. Achilleion, a Neolithic settlement in Thessaly, Greece, 6400-5600 B.C. Los Angeles, Calif.: Institute of Archaeology, University of California, Los Angeles, 1989.
- Marija Gimbutas. “Achilleion: A Neolithic Mound in Thessaly; Preliminary Report on 1973 and 1974 Excavations”, Journal of Field Archaeology 1, no. 3/4 (1974): 277–302.
- Catherine Perlès. The early Neolithic in Greece: the first farming communities in Europe. Cambridge: Cambridge University Press, 2001.
- “Thessaly”, Encyclopædia Britannica.
