= Saulė Cemetery =

Cemetery in Vilnius, Lithuania

Coordinates: 54°41′40″N 25°18′42″E

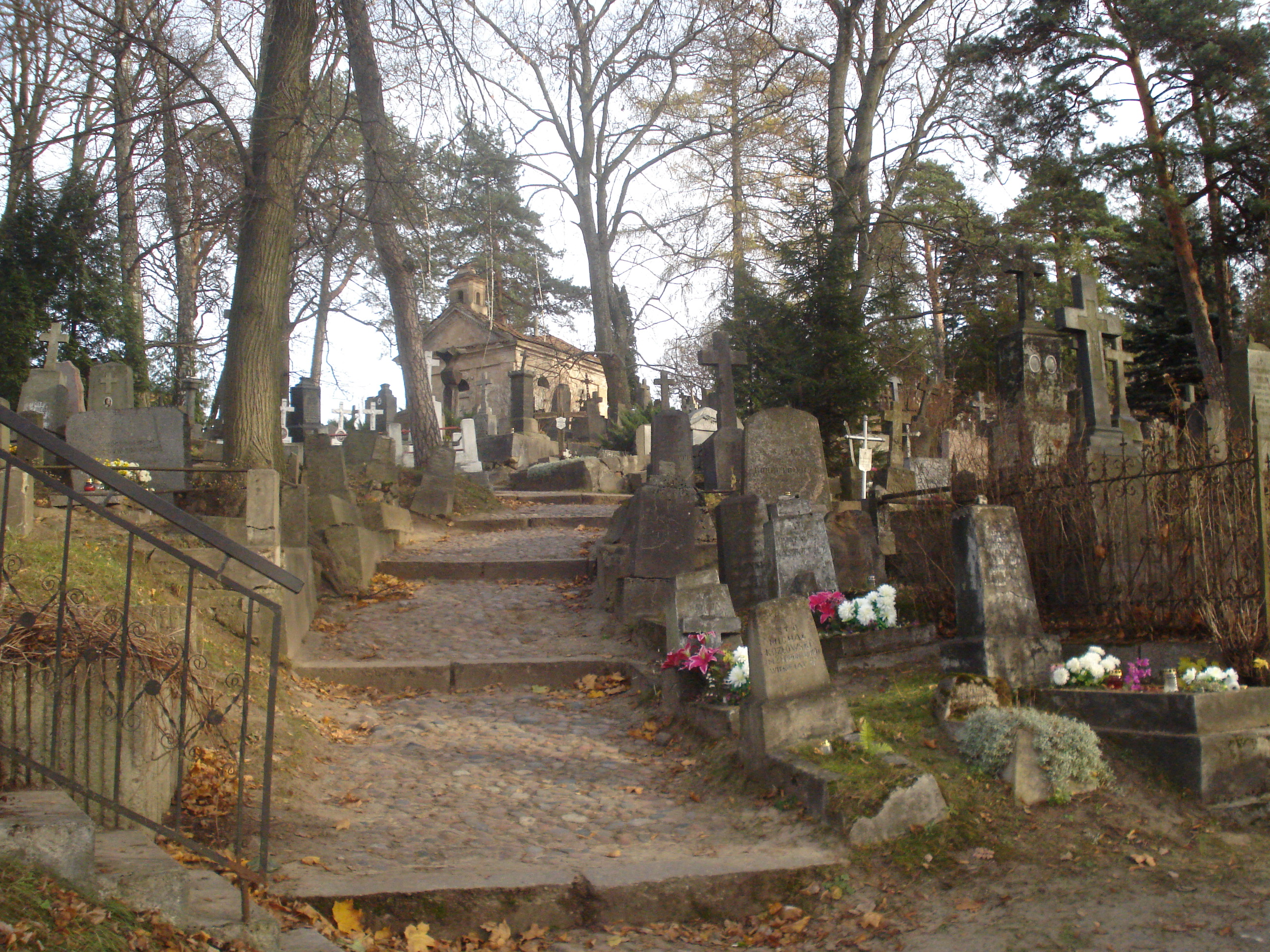
Stairs leading to the Chapel of St. Vincent de Paul

The Saulė Cemetery (Lithuanian: Saulės kapinės; transl. Sun Cemetery) is a cemetery in Antakalnis district of Vilnius, Lithuania. It is the old parish cemetery of the St. Peter and St. Paul Church and is the place of rest of many noble Poles and Lithuanians.

== History ==
It is believed that the first burials took place during the 1710 plague. The Chapel of St. Vincent de Paul was built in 1811, but the first known mention of the cemetery is only from 1828. It was the parish cemetery of the nearby St. Peter and St. Paul Church until 1945. At that time, Soviet authorities renamed the cemetery after the nearby Saulė Street. At the same time, the cemetery was enlarged by 2 hectares (4.9 acres).

The cemetery has three family chapels-mausoleums of Zawiszas, Ogiński, and Meysztowicz families.

== Notable burials ==
Famous people buried here include:

- Danielius Alseika (1881–1936), Lithuanian physician and activist
- Jonas Kazlauskas (1930–1970), Lithuanian linguist
- Petras Kraujalis (1882–1933), Lithuanian activist
- Meilė Lukšienė (1913–2009), Lithuanian historian
- Marija Rudzinskaitė-Arcimavičienė (1885–1941), Lithuanian Orientalist, Egyptologist and educator.
- Teodoras Valaitis (1934–1974), sculptor-modernist
- Józef Zawadzki (1781–1838), the editor of the first poems of Adam Mickiewicz
- Wincenta Zawadzka (1824–1894), author of Kucharka Litewska (Lithuanian Cook), the first Lithuanian cookbook
