= Marija Rudzinskaitė-Arcimavičienė =

Lithuanian Orientalist, Egyptologist and educator (1885–1941)

- Rudzinskaitė during the 20th century
- Born: Marija Rudzinskaitė; 16 July 1885; Šaravai, Kovno Governorate, Russian Empire
- Died: 8 May 1941 (aged 55); Vilnius, Lithuanian SSR, USSR
- Resting place: Saulė Cemetery

Academic background
- Education: Higher Women's Courses; Imperial Moscow University

Marija Rudzinskaitė-Arcimavičienė (née Rudzinskaitė; 16 July 1885 – 8 May 1941) was a Lithuanian Orientalist, Egyptologist, writer, translator and educator.

== Early life and education ==
Rudzinskaitė-Arcimavičienė was born Marija Rudzinskaitė on 16 July 1885 in Šaravai, Kovno Governorate (present-day Lithuania). From a Polish-speaking minor noble family, Rudzinskaitė was the sister of the agronomist Dionizas Rudzinskas.

Educated at a Gymnasium in Kaunas, Rudzinskaitė later settled in Moscow. Completing a teacher training course in 1904, Rudzinskaitė enrolled in the Higher Women's Courses and graduated with a Diploma of Higher Education in 1908. In 1910, Rudzinskaitė-Arcimavičienė travelled with the Moscow Archaeological Commission, via Constantinople, to Egypt and Palestine.

By 1912, Rudzinskaitė was studying at Imperial Moscow University where she attended lectures on Egyptology by Boris Turayev. During this period Rudzinskaitė took teaching jobs, and published the brochure Constantinoplе (Russian: Константинопол) in 1915 for the War and Culture series of the Historical Commission of the Society for the Dissemination of Technical Knowledge. (Note: Also cited as being published in 1914. Rudzinskaitė-Arcimavičienė is also cited as publishing a second brochure Egypt (Russian: Египта) in 1914 however, Aldona Snitkuvienė of the M. K. Čiurlionis National Art Museum posits that this brochure was in fact written by Semion Narkiryer in 1915.) Thought to have married around 1915, Rudzinskaitė-Arcimavičienė was widowed shortly afterwards. On 26 November 1916, Rudzinskaitė-Arcimavičienė graduated from the Faculty of History and Philology with a master's diploma in world history.

== Career ==
Returning to Kaunas in 1918, Rudzinskaitė-Arcimavičienė began working as a teacher. Appointed as an associate professor at Vytautas Magnus University on 1 July 1922, Rudzinskaitė-Arcimavičienė founded a course on history of Ancient Egypt. Initially giving her lectures in Russian, from 1924 onwards Rudzinskaitė-Arcimavičienė taught in Lithuanian. A period of bad health forced her to leave the position at Vytautas Magnus University in 1925, but she returned in 1929.

The same year Rudzinskaitė-Arcimavičienė returned to Egypt and Palestine, where she began to cultivate her collection of Ancient Egyptian artefacts. The collection, used for teaching purposes, was made up of 23 Egyptian antiquities including mummified remains and sarcophagi.

Visiting Egypt for the third time in 1934, Rudzinskaitė-Arcimavičienė published the first Lithuanian textbook of Egyptology in 1936. Rudzinskaitė-Arcimavičienė also translated works of Ancient Egyptian literature into Lithuanian. In January 1940, despite being in poor health, Rudzinskaitė-Arcimavičienė began working at the University of Vilnius.

Fearing that her collection would be nationalised by Soviet authorities during the 1940 Soviet occupation, Rudzinskaitė-Arcimavičienė transferred the collection to the Kaunas Museum of Culture.

== Personal life ==
Through her brother Dionizas, Rudzinskaitė-Arcimavičienė was the aunt of the actress Janina Rudzinskaitė-Dautartienė. On 8 May 1941, Rudzinskaitė-Arcimavičienė died in Vilnius aged 55. Buried at Saulė Cemetery, the wooden cross which marked her grave was damaged and location of her grave was ultimately lost during the Nazi occupation. Rudzinskaitė-Arcimavičienė's grave was later reused.

In 2024, a sarcophagus-shaped cenotaph by Ksenija Jaroševaitė was erected at Saulė Cemetery in her memory.

== Publications ==
- Rudzinskaya, M. A. (1915). Константинопол [Constantinoplе]. War and Culture, 44 (in Russian). Moscow: Historical Commission of the Society for the Dissemination of Technical Knowledge.
- Rudzinskaitė-Arcimavičienė, M. (1932). Senovės Rytai. D. 1: Egipto Ieroglifai. Kaunas.
- Rudzinskaitė-Arcimavičienė, M. (1932). Senovės Rytai. D. 2: Moters būklė senovės Egipte: (pirmoji moteris soste – faraonė Chatšepsut). Kaunas.
- Rudzinskaitė-Arcimavičienė, M. (1933). Senovės Rytai. D. 3: Tut–Anch–Amono kapas ir Tebų paminklai. Kaunas.
- Rudzinskaitė-Arcimavičienė, M. (1934). Senovės Rytai. D. 4: Vardo reikšmė senovės Egipte. Kaunas.
- Rudzinskaitė-Arcimavičienė, M. (1936). Senovės Rytų istorija. T. 1: Aigiptas. Kaunas: V. D. Universiteto Humanitarinių mokslų fakultetas.
