= Veronika Alseikienė =

Lithuanian physician (1883–1971)

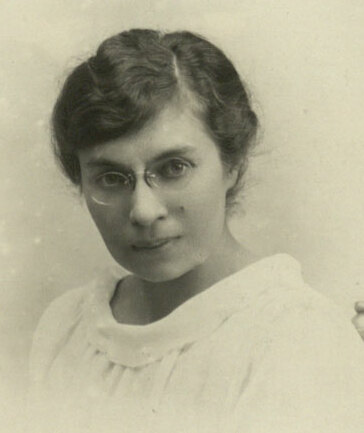
- Alseikienė c. 1920
- Born: Veronika Janulaitytė; 18 May 1883; Malavėnai, Russian Empire
- Died: 26 September 1971 (aged 88); Kaunas, Lithuanian SSR
- Burial place: Petrašiūnai Cemetery
- Education: University of Bern; University of Berlin
- Occupation: Physician
- Board member of: Lithuanian Sanitary Aid Society
- Spouse: Danielius Alseika
- Children: Vytautas Kazimieras Alseika; Marija Gimbutas

Veronika Alseikienė née Janulaitytė (1883–1971) was a Lithuanian physician and activist. (Note: Alseikienė is often incorrectly named as the first Lithuanian woman to obtain higher education. Barbora Burbaitė-Eidukevičienė graduated from the University of Zurich in 1892.)

She studied medicine at the Universities of Bern and Berlin choosing ophthalmology as her specialty. She established her private practice in Ukmergė in summer 1910. During World War I, together with her husband Danielius Alseika, she co-founded the Lithuanian Sanitary Aid Society. This society purchased a military hospital and moved it from Minsk to Vilnius. Alseikienė worked at this hospital until 1931. At the same time, she actively participated in the Lithuanian cultural life in the Vilnius Region which was contested between Poland and Lithuania.

In 1931, she decided to move to Kaunas and effectively retire from the public life. At the end of World War II, both of her children – journalist Vytautas Kazimieras Alseika and archaeologist Marija Gimbutas – retreated to Germany and then moved to the United States. Alseikienė remained in Lithuania and did not reestablish contacts with her children until the mid-1950s.

== Biography ==
=== Early life and education ===
Veronika Alseikienė was born on 18 May 1883 in Malavėnai near Šiauliai, then part of the Russian Empire. She was the youngest of 13 children, nine of whom reached adulthood and five completed university education. Her siblings included judge and professor Augustinas Janulaitis, Catholic priest Pranciškus Janulaitis, and dentist Julija Biliūnienė. Her father died when she was a year old.

She received her first education at home. She then enrolled at the Šiauliai Girls' Gymnasium, but was expelled for keeping and distributing banned Lithuanian publications. She managed to get accepted to a gymnasium in Mitau (now Jelgava in Latvia) and graduate in 1902. While in Mitau, she lived in the dormitory of Liudvika Didžiulienė for a year. Alseikienė wanted to study medicine, but such studies were not available for women in Russia. She then enrolled at the University of Bern in Switzerland where her brother Augustinas was also a student. She also studied in Vienna for one semester and later transferred to the University of Berlin. In Berlin, she was one of four women among 400 medical students. She chose ophthalmology as her specialty because she wanted to treat trachoma, a preventable disease than can lead to blindness.

While in Berlin, she became acquainted with philosopher Vydūnas and took care of the terminally ill Povilas Višinskis. She also attended a lecture by Clara Zetkin but was not impressed by it.

=== Medical career ===
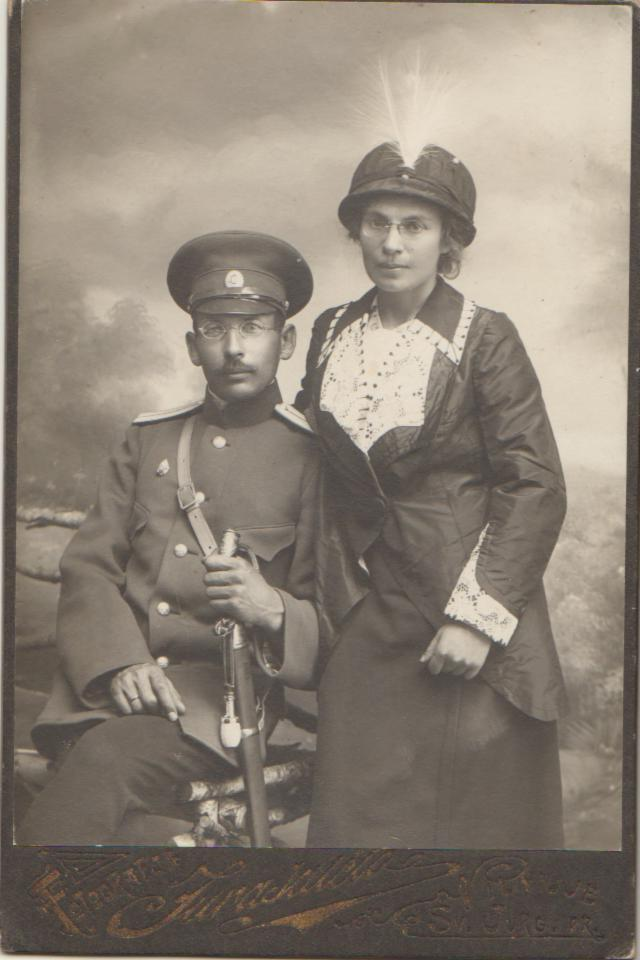
Alseikienė with her husband in 1915

Alseikienė graduated with a doctorate in summer 1908 and returned to Russia. However, to validate her foreign diploma, she had to pass additional examination in January 1909. She then visited Vilnius where she joined the Lithuanian Art Society and met Danielius Alseika, then a student at the Imperial University of Dorpat, who encouraged her to take further classes in Dorpat. To get more practice, she signed up for a mobile eye clinic that treated people in the Simbirsk Governorate. She then briefly worked at the clinic of Vladimir Dolganov before signing up to treat an outbreak of typhus in the Tula Governorate. This work paid 300 Russian rubles and allowed her to earn enough money to purchase medical equipment so that she could open her private practice.

She returned to Lithuania and opened a private practice in Ukmergė in summer 1910. She was joined by her now-husband Danielius Alseika who specialized in otorhinolaryngology (ear, nose, and throat). They briefly attended additional medical courses in Vienna but rushed to return to Lithuania at the outbreak of World War I. Alseikienė worked at a Red Cross hospital in Vilnius. She also became a board member of Sveikata (Health), a society that provided free medical assistance to war refugees.

When the city was occupied by the Germans in September 1915, she retreated to Russia. For sometime, she lived in Voronezh, which was a center of Lithuanian refugees. She worked with the Lithuanian Society for the Relief of War Sufferers treating Lithuanian students before moving to Minsk to work at various military hospitals. She established a 30-bed hospital with assistance from the Red Cross and General Aleksei Evert, commander of the Western Front. For these efforts, she was awarded the Order of Saint Stanislaus.

In Minsk, she reunited with her husband who was drafted to the Russian Imperial Army. When the city was occupied by the Germans in early 1918, they established the Lithuanian Sanitary Aid Society which received a permit from the German authorities to treat and vaccinate war refugees returning via Minsk to Lithuania. This was accomplished thanks to Alseikienė's acquaintance from the university, German officer Werner Miller. At the same time, she was a board member of various committees providing assistance to war refugees. In May 1918, together with Jonas Variakojis, she became a representative of the Council of Lithuania in Orsha. She was tasked with communicating with the German authorities regarding the returning refugees.

The Sanitary Aid Society managed to purchase equipment and other inventory of a war hospital and relocated it to Vilnius in July 1918. She worked at this hospital until 1931 and performed more than 300 cataract surgeries.

=== Other activities ===
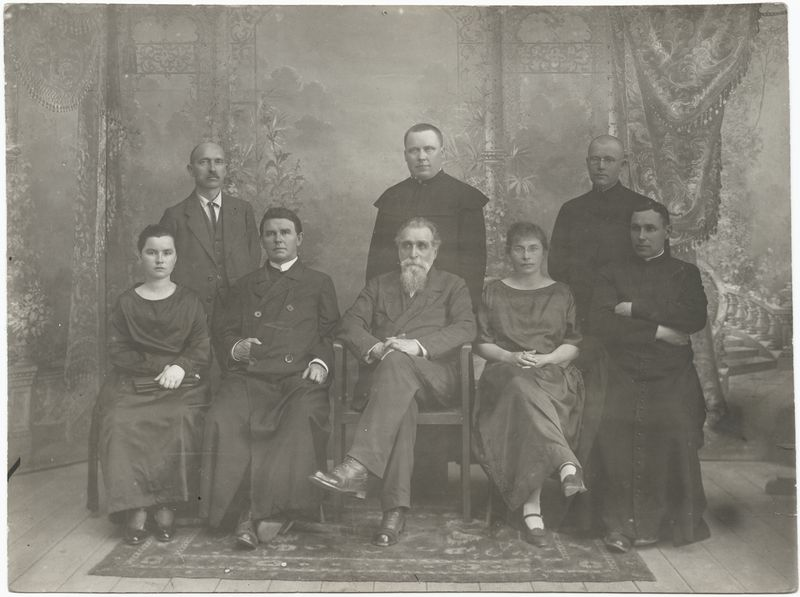
Board members of the Lithuanian Society for the Relief of War Sufferers (Alseikienė sits second from the right)

In addition to her work at the hospital of the Lithuanian Sanitary Aid Society and private practice, Alseikienė actively participated in the Lithuanian cultural life. Working with the Lithuanian Society for the Relief of War Sufferers, she volunteered to treat war orphans who lived in ten orphanages maintained by the society. To teach these children skills, she initiated crafts classes (for example, knitting for girls and blacksmithing for boys). She also participated in the activities of the Lithuanian Education Society Rytas.

The Vilnius Region was bitterly contested between interwar Lithuania and the Second Polish Republic. Her husband was the chairman of the Provisional Committee of Vilnius Lithuanians in 1923–1928. The committee promoted Lithuanian culture in the region. For such activities, Alseika was persecuted by the Polish authorities. In May 1924, the Polish authorities wanted to deport both Alseika and Alseikienė, but it was avoided after a complaint to the Human Rights League in Paris. When Alseika resigned from the Provisional Committee, they both worked to establish the Kultūra Society which Alseika chaired in 1929–1934.

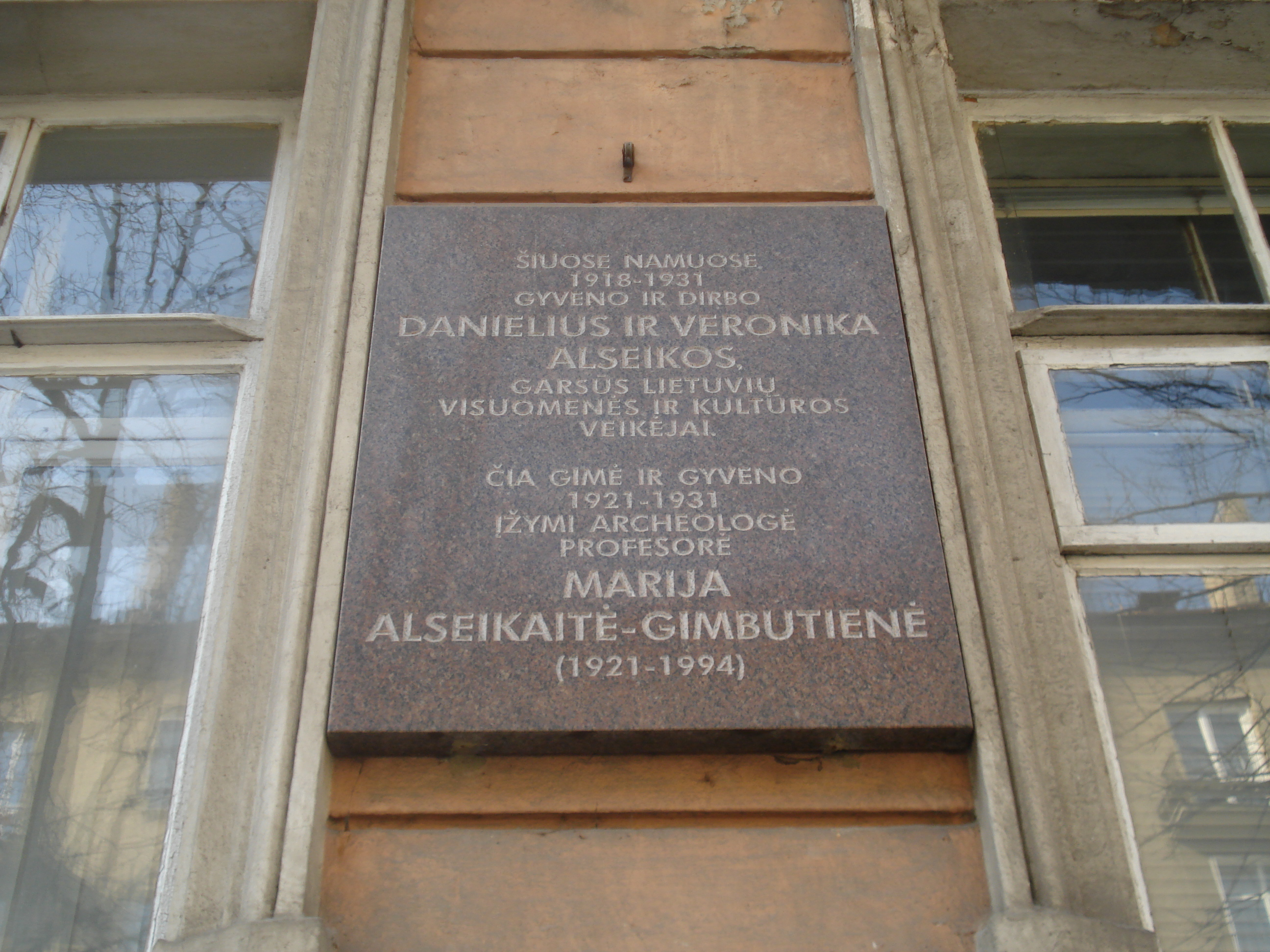
Memorial plaque on the house where the Alseika family lived in Vilnius in 1918–1931

=== Later life ===
In 1931, Alseikienė left her husband in Vilnius and moved to Kaunas with her two children. Her son Vytautas Kazimieras Alseika graduated high school and did not want to attend the Polish Vilnius University. She was also exhausted by the thankless charitable work, financial difficulties, continuous conflicts at the hospital. As she later wrote in her memoirs, "I decided to quit everything because my nerves couldn't take it anymore". Her relationship with her husband remained close until his death in 1936, though their marriage was troubled from the start.

In Kaunas, Alseikienė lived with her sister Julija Biliūnienė. Alseikienė's daughter Marija Gimbutas later claimed that her cousin Meilė Lukšienė had a formative influence on her youth. Alseikienė worked at the National Health Insurance Fund and opened a private practice, but otherwise retired from public life. She retired in 1943, but she did not receive a government pension which forced her to keep her private practice open. During 1944, both of her children decided to retreat to Germany and later move to the United States. She remained in Lithuania and did not establish stable contact with them until mid-1950s. She was able to see her daughter Marija Gimbutas in 1960, 1968, and 1971.

Alseikienė died after a long illness on 26 September 1971. She was buried at Petrašiūnai Cemetery.
