= Justinas Marcinkevičius =

Lithuanian poet and playwright

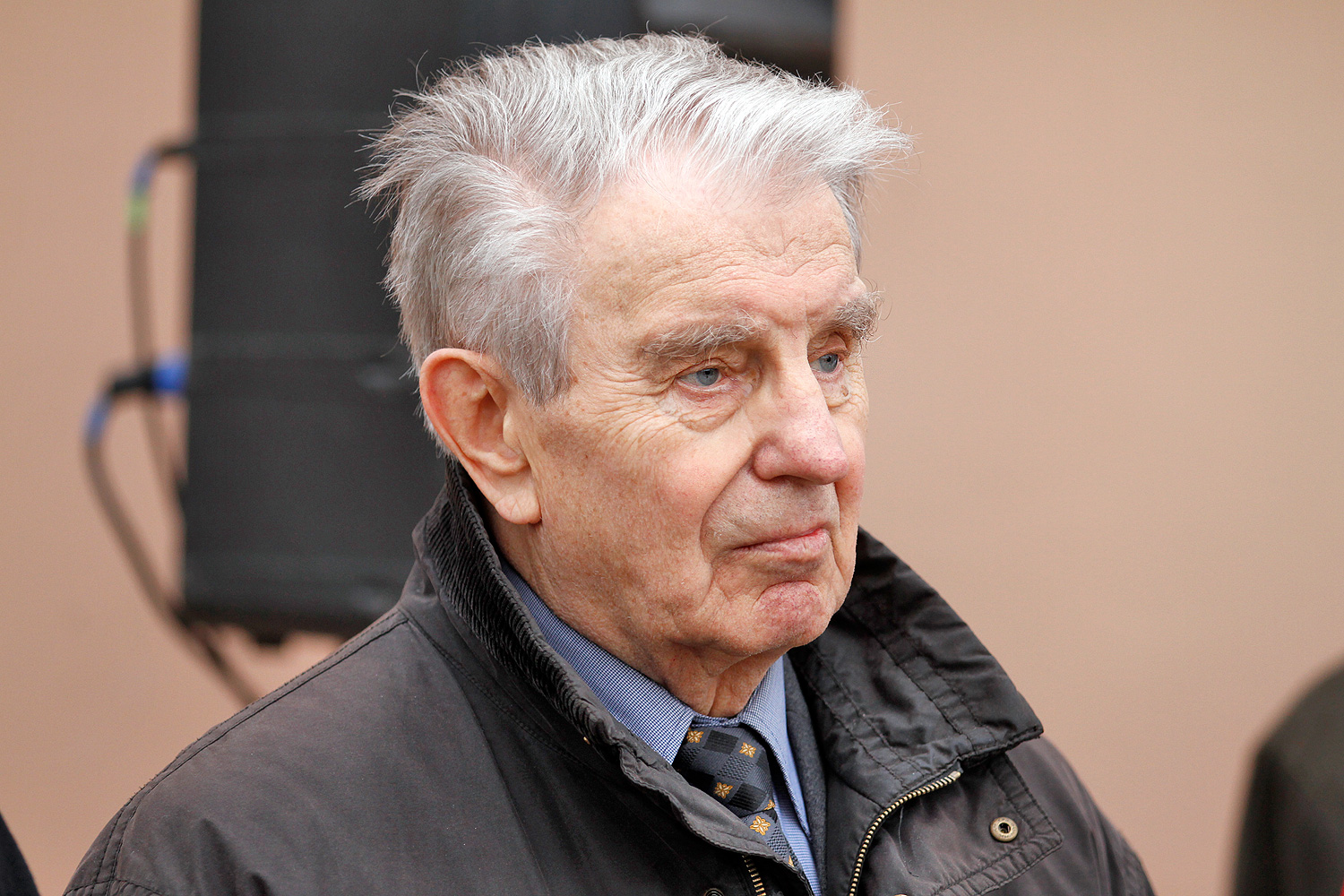
Justinas Marcinkevičius

Justinas Marcinkevičius (10 March 1930 – 16 February 2011) was a Lithuanian poet and playwright.

== Life and career ==
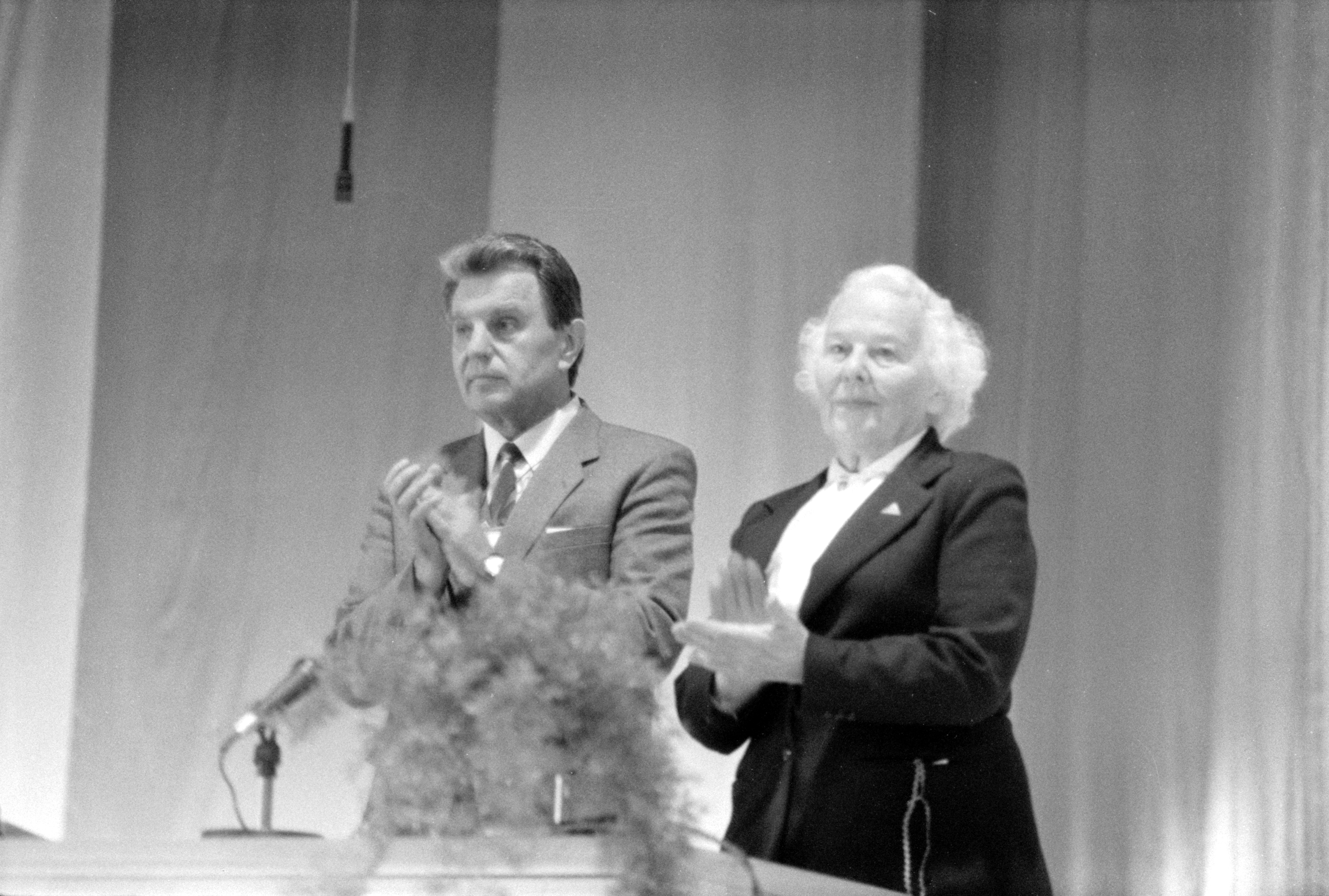
Justinas Marcinkevičius and pedagogist Meilė Lukšienė during the Constituent Congress of Sąjūdis, 1988

Marcinkevičius was born in 1930 in Važatkiemis, Prienai District. In 1954, he graduated from the Faculty of History and Philology of Vilnius University with a degree in Lithuanian language and literature. He joined the Communist Party of Lithuania in 1957. He worked for a number of years as vice-chairman of the board of the Union of Lithuanian Writers. Marcinkevičius is regarded as one of the most prominent members of Sąjūdis. He died in Vilnius.

== Literary style and themes ==
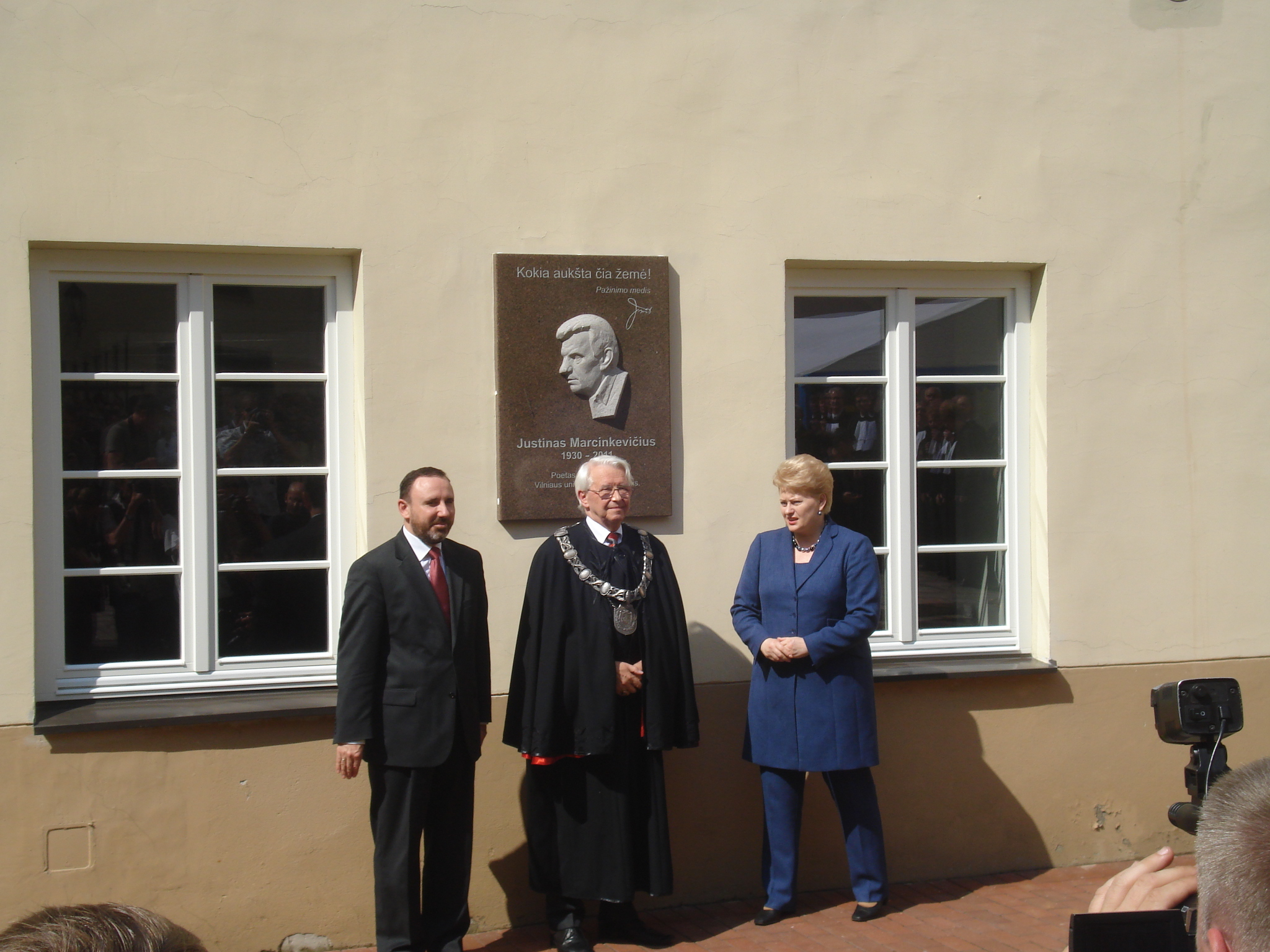
President Dalia Grybauskaitė (right) during the unveiling ceremony of the memorial plaque at Vilnius University

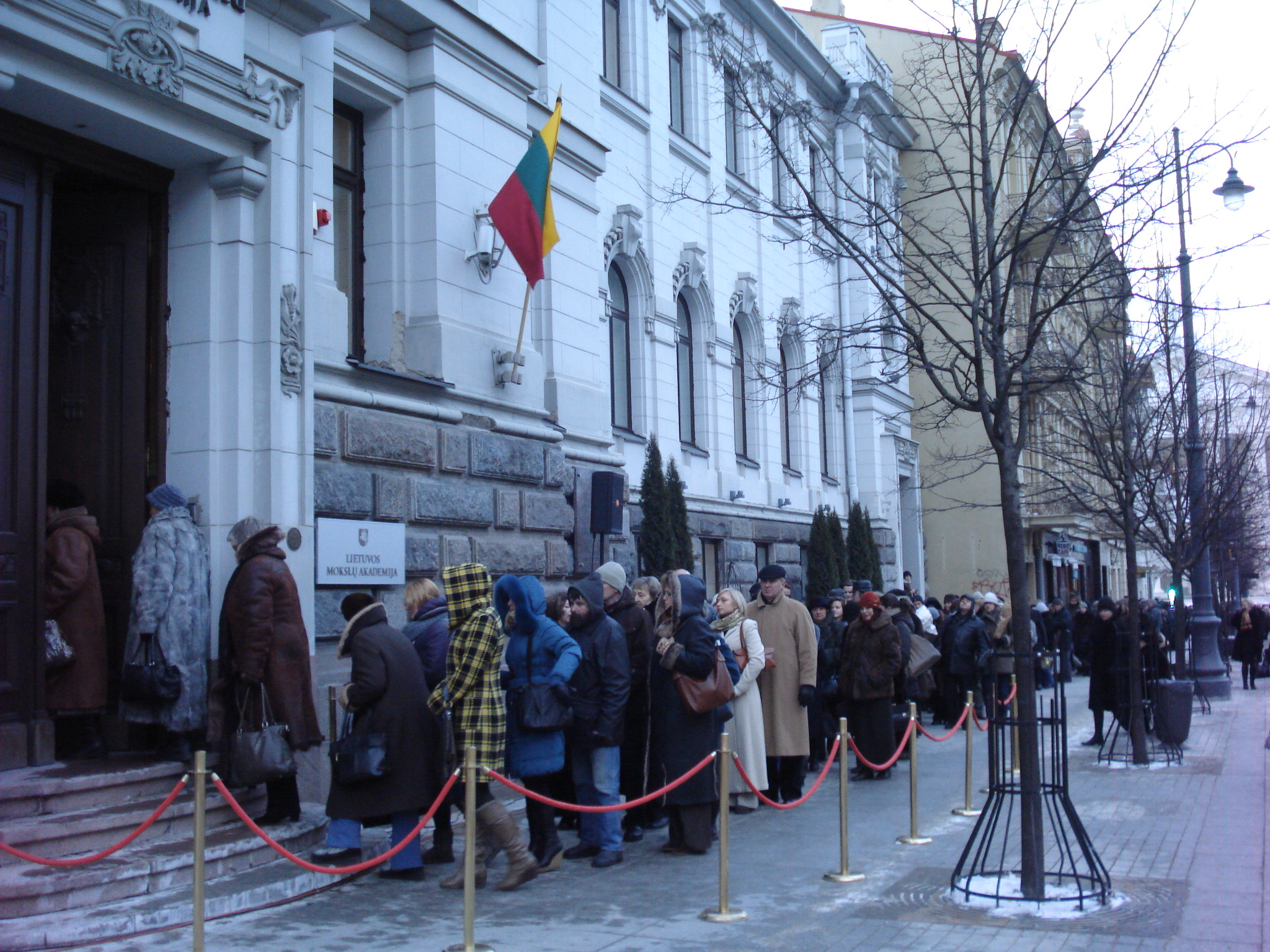
People queuing to pay last respects to Marcinkevičius in Vilnius

Having grown up during the post-war period, Marcinkevičius evokes in his poetry a romanticized version of childhood spent in the Lithuanian countryside, of first love, of man's relationship with nature. In his poetry specific and solid peasant thinking is combined with a mind seeking to draw broad general conclusions, and the tradition of Lithuanian poetry singing the Earth's praises with contemporary modes of poetic thought. As a poet, he has sought to grasp the essence of national experience and give it fresh artistic expression. In his lyrical verse Marcinkevičius strives to comprehend the real meaning of what is going on inside man and society and moves the reader with his ardent lyrical confessions.

For most his life Justinas Marcinkevičius lived and wrote during the complex times of Soviet totalitarianism. He defended the cultural self-awareness of his nation. The poet brought back humanistic idea in describing a man, continued on the romantic and lyric poetry tradition, valued the aesthetic side of literature, as opposed to the heroic and propagandistic style of socialist realism. Marcinkevičius wrote poems in a romantic and modern style.

== Awards and acknowledgements ==
- Lithuanian National Prize
- Herder Prize 1998
- Baltic Assembly Prize for Literature, the Arts and Science (2001)
- National Advancement Prize in Culture (18 May 2008)

== Works of note ==
After the emergence of Marcinkevičius' first book I Plead for a Word in 1955, he has published fourteen collections of poetry, three historical plays, two collections of essays, a novella and various translations into Lithuanian.

=== Poetry and compilations ===
- Liepsnojantis krūmas (The Burning Bush; 1968)
- Gyvenimo švelnus prisiglaudimas (The Gentle Cuddle of Life; 1978)
- Rhymed trilogy of historical dramas:
  - Mindaugas (1968, English translation of Part 2 in 1971)
  - Mažvydas (1977)
  - Katedra (The Cathedral; 1971)

=== Novels ===
- Dienoraštis be datų (A Diary Without Dates; 1981)
- Tekančios upės vienybė (Unity of a Flowing River; 1994)

He has also translated into Lithuanian works of Adam Mickiewicz, Alexandr Pushkin, Sergei Yesenin, Mikhail Lermontov, and the Finnish Kalevala legend.
