= Danielius Alseika =

Lithuanian physician

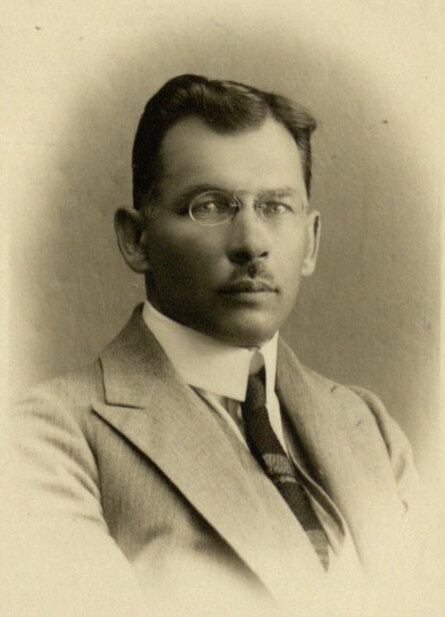
- Born: 29 January 1881; Bružai, Russian Empire
- Died: 9 May 1936 (aged 55); Vilnius, Second Polish Republic
- Education: University of Warsaw; Imperial University of Dorpat
- Occupation: Physician
- Board member of: Lithuanian Sanitary Aid Society; Provisional Committee of Vilnius Lithuanians
- Spouse: Veronika Alseikienė
- Children: Vytautas Kazimieras Alseika; Marija Gimbutas
- Relatives: Brother Albinas Alseika

Danielius Alseika (Polish: Daniel Olsejko; 1881–1936) was a Lithuanian physician and activist. He was the father of the archaeologist Marija Gimbutas.

Born to a family of Lithuanian peasants, Alseika became actively involved in Lithuanian cultural life as a high school student. He participated in the smuggling of the banned Lithuanian publications, organized protests during the Russian Revolution of 1905, and was one of the co-founders of the Peasant Union.

He graduated as doctor from the Imperial University of Dorpat. During World War I, he was drafted into the Imperial Russian Army and worked as a doctor at various military hospitals. He founded the Lithuanian Sanitary Aid Society which cheaply purchased inventory of a military hospital and transported it to Vilnius where a new Lithuanian hospital was established in 1918. Alseika was director of the hospital until 1933 and chairman of the society until his death. In 1931, Alseika acquired an x-ray machine which did not have proper shielding. He died of the chronic radiation syndrome in 1936.

Alseika lived and worked in Vilnius which was bitterly contested between the interwar Lithuania and the Second Polish Republic. He actively defended Lithuanian rights in Vilnius Region and was chairman of the Provisional Committee of Vilnius Lithuanians in 1923–1928. He also founded and edited Lithuanian periodicals Vilniaus šviesa and Vilniaus žodis.

== Biography ==
=== Early life and education ===
Alseika was born in Bružai near Skuodas in present-day northern Lithuania. He was the youngest of five brothers; one of them was Catholic priest Albinas Alseika. His only sister died young. After primary school in Skuodas, he enrolled at the Mitau Gymnasium. There he was a member of a secret group of Lithuanian students led by the future writer Jonas Biliūnas. Alseika became involved in the smuggling of the banned Lithuanian publications. He also contributed articles to Lithuanian periodicals Ūkininkas and Varpas. Due to such pro-Lithuanian activities, Alseika was expelled from the gymnasium but managed to finish his education at the Marijampolė Gymnasium in 1903.

In 1903, he enrolled at the University of Warsaw to study engineering. For participating in a student strike in 1905, he was expelled. During the Russian Revolution of 1905, he organized protests among the peasants and workers near Vilnius, Trakai, Švenčionys agitating them to strike and resist Tsarist officials. He participated at the Great Seimas of Vilnius and was one of the co-founders of the Peasant Union.

He then went on to study medicine at the Imperial University of Dorpat. At the university, he continued to be involved in Lithuanian activities and led a society of Lithuanian students. He also contributed articles to Lithuanian periodicals, including Lietuvos ūkininkas, Vilniaus žinios, Lietuvos žinios. He graduated with a specialty in otorhinolaryngology (ear, nose, and throat) and moved to work in Ukmergė.

=== Medical career ===
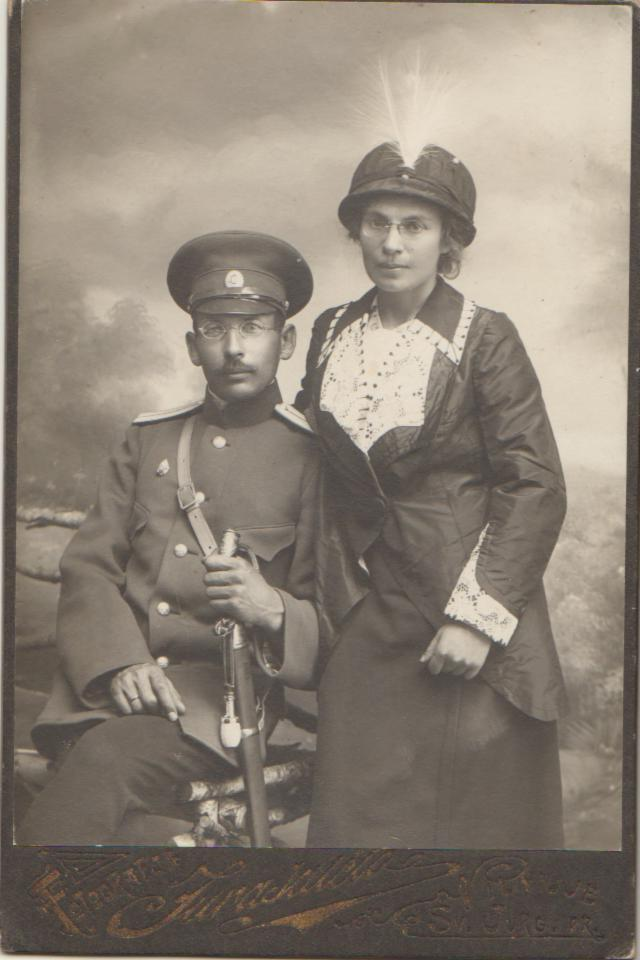
Alseika with his wife Veronika in 1915

In 1913, Alseika moved to Vienna to attend further medical courses. After the outbreak of World War I, he managed to return to Lithuania and was drafted into the Imperial Russian Army. He worked as a doctor in Daugavpils, Petrograd, and other locations. He found himself in charge of a war hospital in Minsk when Germans occupied the city in early 1918. Soon after, he established the Lithuanian Sanitary Aid Society. The society treated and vaccinated war refugees returning via Minsk to Lithuania. Those who could afford, were asked to pay for the treatments. The society then used the funds to purchase equipment and other inventory of the war hospital and relocated it to Vilnius in July 1918. The new hospital was opened in November 1918 and continued to operate until 1941. Alseika was the director of the hospital until 1933 and chairman of the society until he died in 1936.

In 1919–1921, Alseika served as the city and district doctor of Vilnius. In this position, he had to combat a cholera outbreak. In his article published in Medicina, Alseika described how he contained an outbreak that infected 70 people, of which 28 died, in August–October 1921. He also published two booklets on medical inventions (1932) and prevention of tuberculosis (1936).

In 1931, Alseika became interested in x-ray and acquired a machine from the United States. However, it did not have proper shielding, and he began suffering from the chronic radiation syndrome. The last two years of his life, he retreated from Lithuanian public life and devoted his energy to the x-ray hoping to travel to Austria to improve his skills. He was admitted to the Hospital of the Lithuanian Sanitary Aid Society on 1 May 1936 and died on 9 May. The viewing was held at the same hospital and the church service at the Church of Saint Nicholas. Alseika was buried at the Saulė Cemetery in Antakalnis.

=== Lithuanian activities ===
In addition to his medical career, Alseika was also active in Lithuanian cultural life. On 5 December 1918, he as a representative of the Lithuanian Popular Peasants' Union was coopted by the Council of Lithuania. However, he withdrew in less than a month when the council evacuated to Kaunas at the outbreak of the Lithuanian–Soviet War. For ten months in 1920–1921, he toured various communities of the Lithuanian Americans collecting funds for the newly established publishing company Varpas as well as for aid to Lithuanians in the Vilnius Region. After the return, he withdrew from political and party work devoting his energy to the affairs of the Lithuanians in Vilnius Region.

Alseika was one of the co-founders of the Provisional Committee of Vilnius Lithuanians and was its chairman in 1923–1928. The committee functioned as an unofficial representation of Lithuania. It provided legal assistance to residents, campaigned for the rights of Lithuanians in courts and international organizations, and financed Lithuanian education, periodicals, and cultural events. Alseika sought to ally with other ethnic minorities in Poland (Belarusians, Ukrainians, Jews). To that end, a committee was established in Warsaw which published the quadrilingual magazine Natio in 1927. Alseika was one of the editors of Natio. He resigned after a conflict over the Lithuanian participation in the 1928 Polish legislative election: Lithuanians wanted to boycott the election while Alseika advocated participation.

Alseika was the first chairman of the Kultūra Society in 1929–1934. This society operated four Lithuanian primary schools and had 50 local chapters that organized Lithuanian cultural activities. He was also an active member of the Lithuanian Scientific Society and briefly was its acting chairman after the death of Jonas Basanavičius in February 1927. Alseika took care of Basanavičius during his last years.

In 1928, Alseika founded, published, and edited the Lithuanian magazine Vilniaus šviesa. The magazine focused of science and literature and targeted the youth. It was a monthly publication that appeared irregularly and was discontinued in October 1929 and replaced by Vilniaus žodis. Alseika was its editor until 1931. He also published books about Lithuanian national aspirations (Lietuvių tautinė idėja istorijos šviesoje in 1924) and conditions of Lithuanians in Vilnius Region (Vilniaus krašto lietuvių gyvenimas 1919–34 in 1935) as well as two historical books on Grand Duke Vytautas (in 1924 and 1927).

Due to his Lithuanian activities, Alseika was harassed by the Polish authorities. For example, he was briefly arrested and imprisoned in Lukiškės Prison in 1922. The authorities wanted to deport Alseika and his wife in May 1924, but it was avoided after a complaint to the Human Rights League in Paris. The Polish government attempted to deport Alseika again in spring 1927, but the Secretary-General of the League of Nations intervened.

== Personal life ==
In 1910, Alseika married fellow physician Veronika Janulaitytė who specialized in ophthalmology (eyes). They had two children: son Vytautas Kazimieras Alseika (1912–2002) and daughter Marija Gimbutas (1921–1994). The couple split in 1931 when Veronika and the children moved to Kaunas so that the children could attend a Lithuanian university.
