= Giedrė Lukšaitė-Mrázková =

Lithuanian–Czech harpsichordist and organist

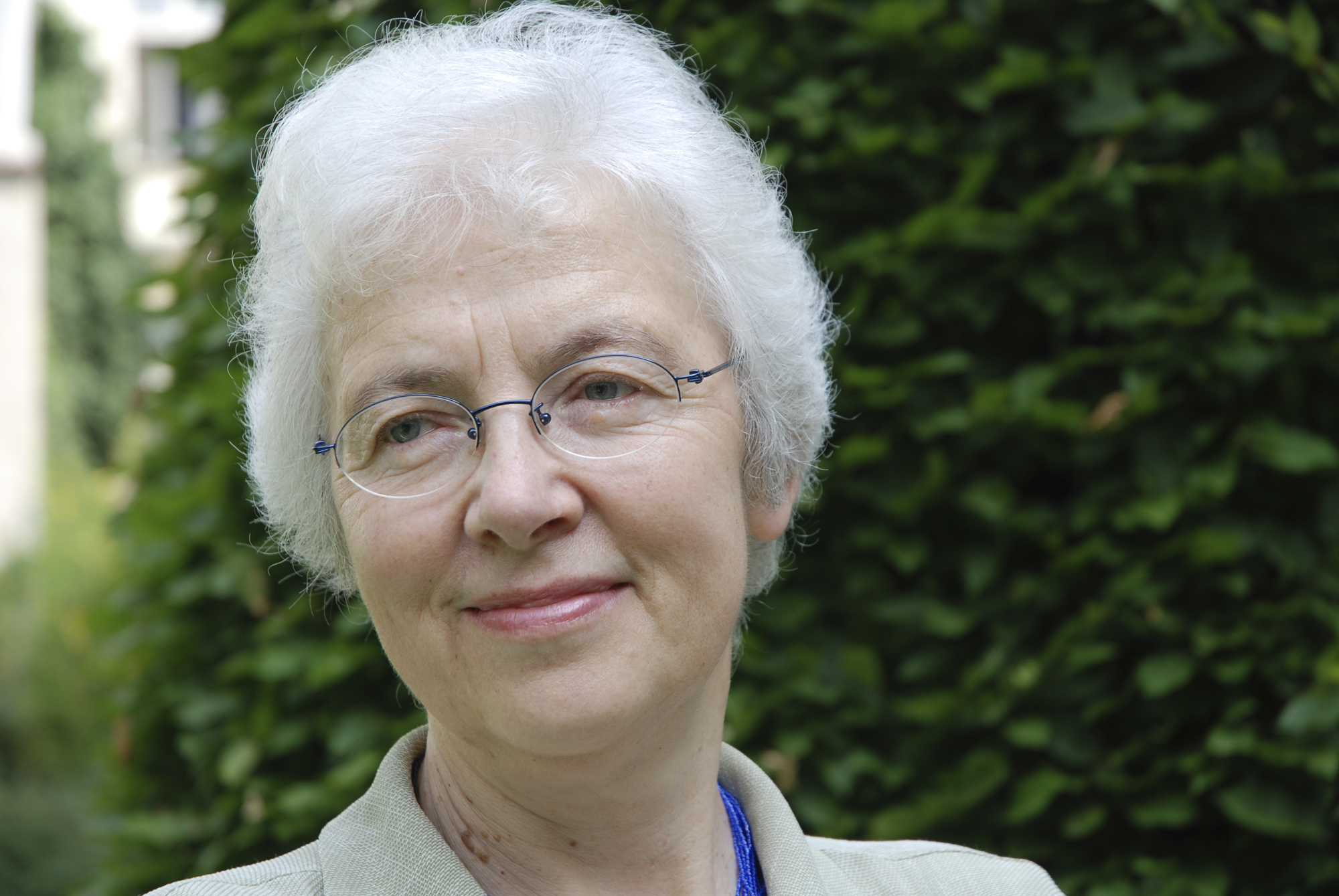
Giedrė Lukšaitė-Mrázková

Giedrė Lukšaitė-Mrázková (born 1944) is a Lithuanian–Czech harpsichordist and organist.

== Life ==
Lukšaitė was born to the family of educator Stasys Matijošaitis and cultural historian Meilė Lukšienė in Kaunas, Lithuania. She studied the organ and piano at the Musical Academy in Vilnius and the P. I. Tchaikovsky State Conservatory in Moscow. She completed her studies at the Musical College of the Academy of Performing Arts in Prague in 1974. Her professor was organist Jiří Reinberger. Afterwards, she studied harpsichord with Zuzana Růžičková.

As a professor of the Faculty of Music of the Academy of Performing Arts in Prague, she has collaborated with Jaroslav Tůma, Gabriela Demeterová, and with many orchestras (the Dresden Philharmonic, the Lithuanian Chamber Orchestra, etc.). She was a member of the chamber orchestra Ars Rediviva led by Music Director Milan Munclinger.
