= Jonas Biliūnas =

Lithuanian writer (1879–1907)

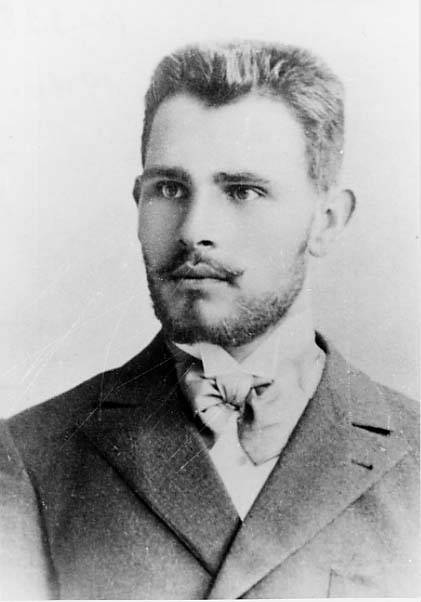
- Born: 11 April 1879; Anykščiai, Kovno Governorate
- Died: 8 December 1907 (aged 28); Zakopane, Austria-Hungary
- Resting place: Liudiškiai hillfort
- Occupation: Writer

Jonas Biliūnas (11 April 1879 – 8 December 1907) was a Lithuanian writer, poet, and a significant contributor to the national awakening of Lithuania in the late 19th and early 20th centuries.

== Biography ==
=== Early life ===
Biliūnas was born near Anykščiai, in the Kovno Governorate of the Russian Empire, in the tiny village of Niūronys, where he spent his early childhood. Between 1891 and 1899, he attended the secondary school in Liepāja (now in Latvia).

=== Studies at universities ===
In 1900, he matriculated as a medical student at the University of Tartu (now in Estonia). He had already been writing for various publications of a socialist nature under the pseudonyms of J. Anykštėnas, Jonas Gražys, J. Barzdyla, as well as others. His anti-Tsarist activities and support of the Social Democratic Party of Lithuania caused him to be expelled from medical school in 1901, and he returned to Lithuania and lived in Šiauliai and Panevėžys until 1903. After several unsuccessful attempts to return to the University of Tartu, Biliūnas journeyed to Leipzig in the German Empire, where he enrolled in the Handelshochschule, a business and commercial school. Around this period Biliūnas took a greater interest in literature in general, and creative writing in particular. After one semester at the business school, he decided to enroll at the University of Leipzig where he began his formal studies of literature with an emphasis on literary composition.

=== Religious experience ===
As he was growing weaker with illness, he more often hallucinated, yet was still an atheist. Unexpectedly however, once in a Leipzigian theatre, Biliūnas suddenly saw Jesus Christ onstage in an act, who quietly whispered to Biliūnas: "We'll meet in a short while. Work". Biliūnas immediately fainted. This hallucination undercut Biliūnas' worldview and baffled his mind.

=== Illness ===
Signs of ill health in Biliūnas had already begun to manifest themselves during his earlier studies at Tartu. By 1904, it became clear that he had tuberculosis, and the disease had done considerable damage to his health. After spending the summer of 1904 in Lithuania, Biliūnas enrolled at the University of Zurich that autumn. Within a year the disease had forced him to abandon his studies, and he was admitted into a tuberculosis sanatorium, in Zakopane (in Poland). He was cared for by his wife Julija Biliūnienė. After briefly visiting with his family in Lithuania during the summer of 1906, Biliūnas returned to the sanatorium and died on 8 December 1907.

=== Burial ===
The two World Wars, and other political considerations, prevented Biliūnas' desire to have his remains returned to Lithuania. Finally in 1953, his wishes were realized, and he was re-interred on a hillfort mound near his birthplace, and a museum was created in Anykščiai honoring his life and works.

== Literary works and assessment ==
Biliūnas is considered to have two distinct periods in his literary career. The first spans the years 1900-1903, and the second, 1904-1907. Most of his works are short stories, and often have autobiographical inclusions dealing with his own personal life experiences. In the first period, a realistic style imbued with a strong social consciousness is prevalent in his writings. Two of his works from this period include Be darbo (Unemployed), and Pirmutinis streikas (First Strike). A political ideology of a socialist nature permeate this period and are reminiscent of the early writings of Jack London and Theodore Dreiser. Possibly as a result of his debilitating illness, which in that time period was inevitably fatal, Biliūnas underwent a spiritual metamorphosis. His political activities and interests were supplanted by a melancholy, and a departure from realism, which were now manifested in his writings of the second period. Brisiaus galas (The End of Brisius), is a tear-jerking recounting of the demise of a family dog with the thoughts of the dog interspersed with the thoughts of his owner. Ant Uetlibergo giedra (Fine Weather on the Uetliberg) is almost a travelog of his perspective of the Swiss Alps near Zürich. Liūdna pasaka (A Sad Tale) is his longest work, a psychological drama dealing with the Uprising of 1863. The main character, a woman, is driven to ruin as a consequence of the uprising. During the period between 1900 and 1905, Biliūnas wrote approximately fifteen poems, including several sonnets. These sonnets were influenced by his studies of Petrarch. Most critical reviews of his poems are of the opinion that they fall short of his other writings. Biliūnas wrote several articles concerning literary criticism, which are highly regarded and considered to show his depth of perception concerning the subjects he dealt with.

Most of Jonas Biliūnas' works were published posthumously, and have been translated in many different languages.

== Collected works ==
- Įvairūs apsakymėliai. Tilžė: Aušra, 1906. 64 p.
- Liūdna pasaka: kūrybos rinktinė. Vilnius: J. Zavadskis publishing house, 1908. 32 p.
- Žemės gyvenimo reiškiniai. Berlin, 1923. 72 p. (issued 1905; 1921)
- Liūdna pasaka: kūrybos rinktinė. Kaunas, 1937. 73 p.
- Kliudžiau: Kaunas: Valstybinė grožinės literatūros leidykla, 1946.
- Raštai. Kaunas: Valstybinė grožinės literatūros leidykla, 1947.
- Nemunu: apsakymėliai. Kaunas: Valstybinė grožinės literatūros leidykla, 1947. 98 p.
- Joniukas. Vilnius: Valstybinė grožinės literatūros leidykla, 1948. 24 p. (reissued by. Vaga: 1974; 1979)
- Laimės žiburys. Vilnius: Valstybinė grožinės literatūros leidykla, 1949. 14 p.
- Lazda. Vilnius: Valstybinė grožinės literatūros leidykla, 1959. 329 p.
- Liūdna pasaka: kūrybos rinktinė. Vilnius: Valstybinė grožinės literatūros leidykla, 1963. 50 p.
- Žvaigždė: apsakymai. Vilnius: Vaga, 1965. 70 p.
- Laimės žiburys: apsakymai. Vilnius: Vaga, 1965 (reissued. 1976). 79 p.
- Apsakymai. Vilnius: Vaga, 1967 . 77 p. (переизд. 1984)
- Liūdna pasaka: kūrybos rinktinė. Vilnius: Baltos lankos, 1995. 132 p. ISBN 9986-403-67-7
- Kūdikystės sapnai: kūrybos rinktinė. Anykščiai: A. Baranausko ir A. Vienuolio-Žukausko memor. muz., 2001. 121 p.
- Apsakymai; Eilėraščiai. Kaunas: SPAB Spindulys, 2001. 79 p.
- Kliudžiau: apsakymas vaikams. Panevėžys: E. Vaičekauskas boosktsore printing house, 2003. 15 p.
- Proza. Vilnius: Žaltvykslė, 2004. 63 p.
- Kūdikystės sapnai: kūrybos rinktinė / Prepared by Alma Ambraškaitė. Utena: Utenos Indra, 2005. 100 p. ISBN 9986-711-94-0.
