= Lithuanian Sanitary Aid Society =

Lithuanian medical aid organization

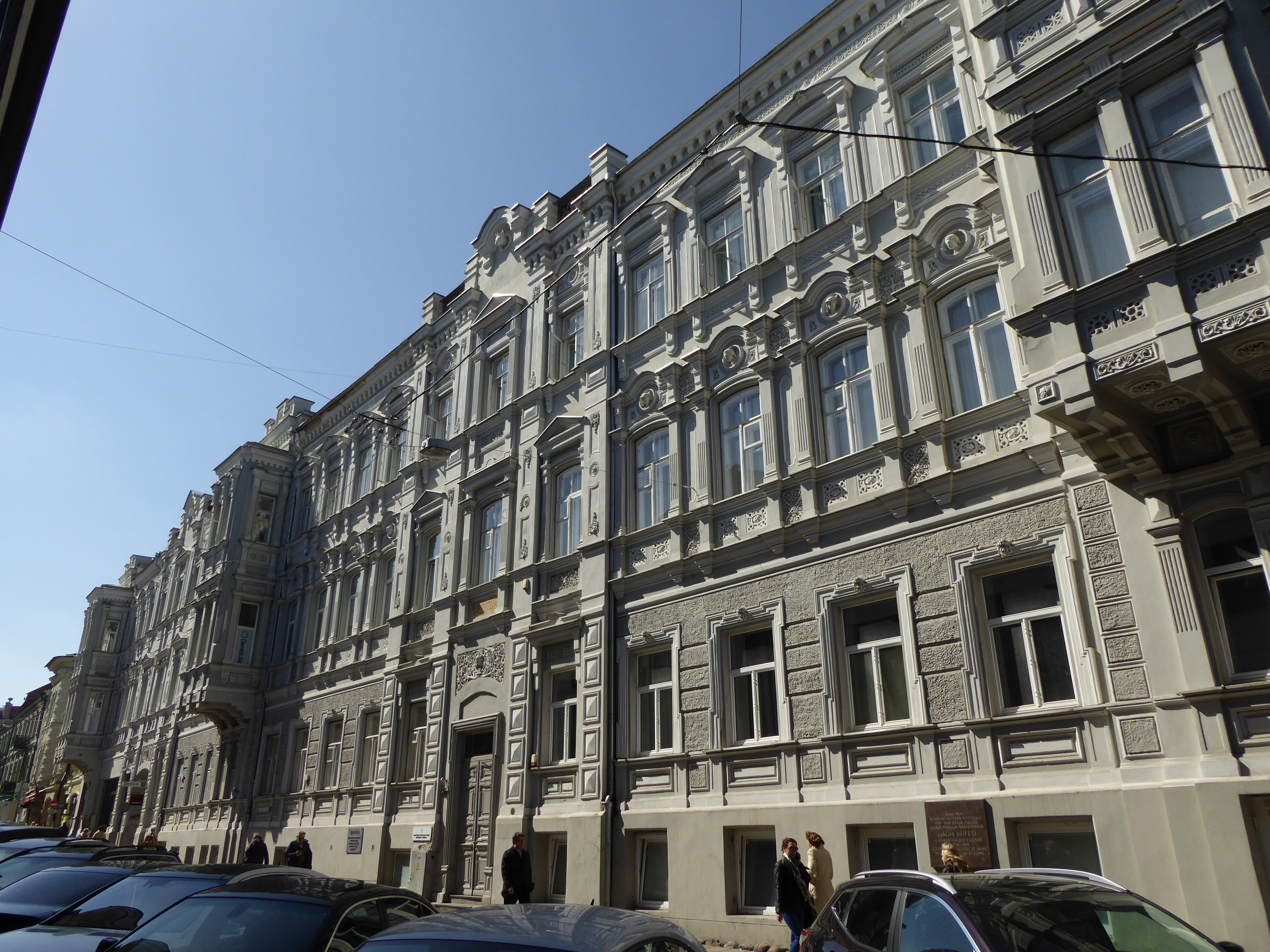
Building on present-day Vilnius Street where the first hospital operated in 1918–1933

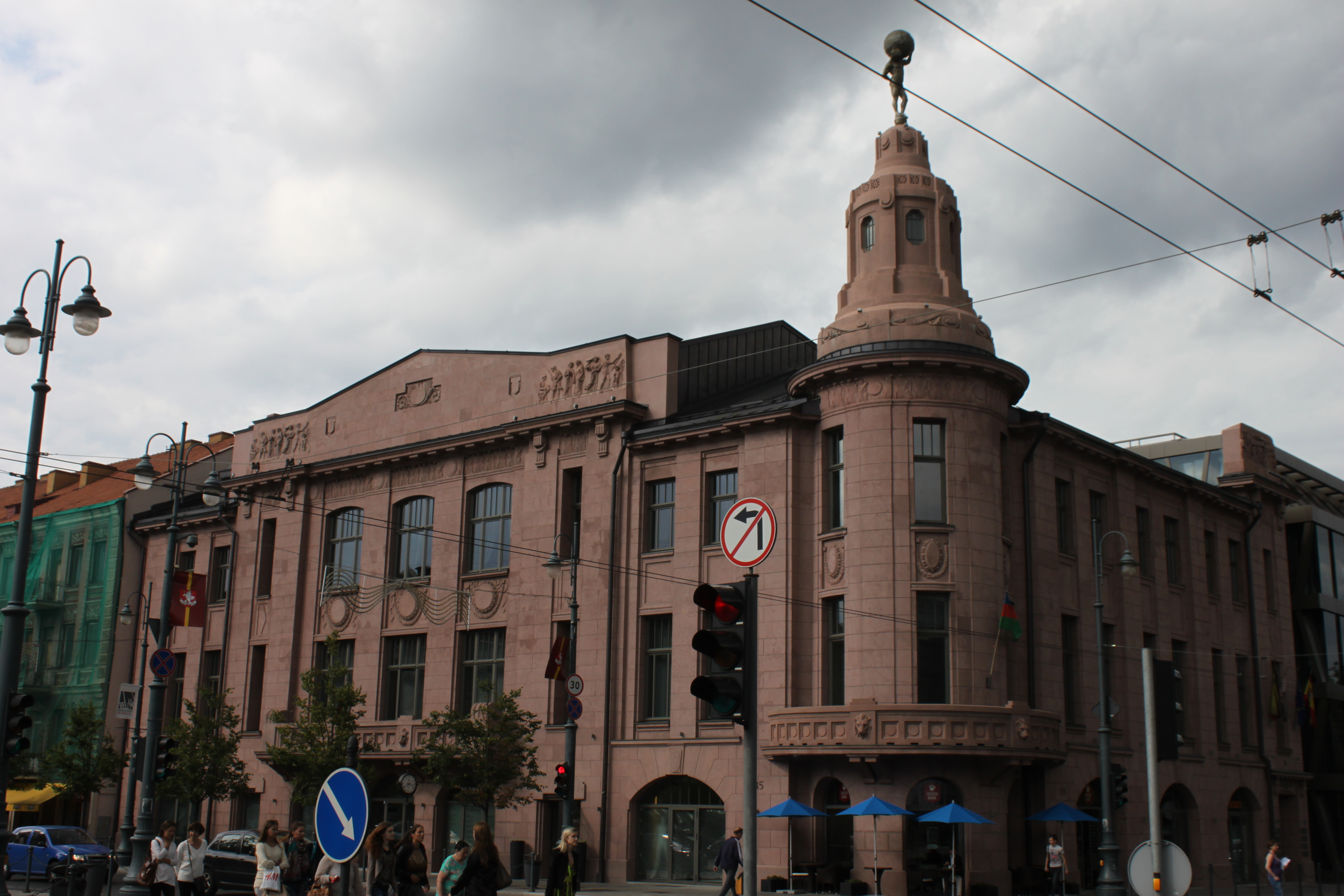
Building on the present-day Gediminas Avenue where new hospital opened in 1933

The Lithuanian Sanitary Aid Society (Lithuanian: Lietuvių sanitarinės pagalbos draugija, Polish: Litewskie Stowarzyszenie Pomocy Sanitarnej) was a Lithuanian society established in 1918 to provide medical care to refugees during World War I. First established in Minsk, the society purchased hospital equipment of a war hospital and relocated to Vilnius in July 1918. There it opened a hospital and continued to operate it until around 1941. Over the years, the hospital treated a total of about 300,000 patients. It was a charitable society, thus many of its treatments were provided at low cost or for free. After Vilnius incorporation into the Second Polish Republic, the society and the hospital were one of a few Lithuanian institutions active in Vilnius Region. The society and the hospital were headed by Danielius Alseika and, after his death, by Vytautas Legeika.

== History ==
=== Establishment ===
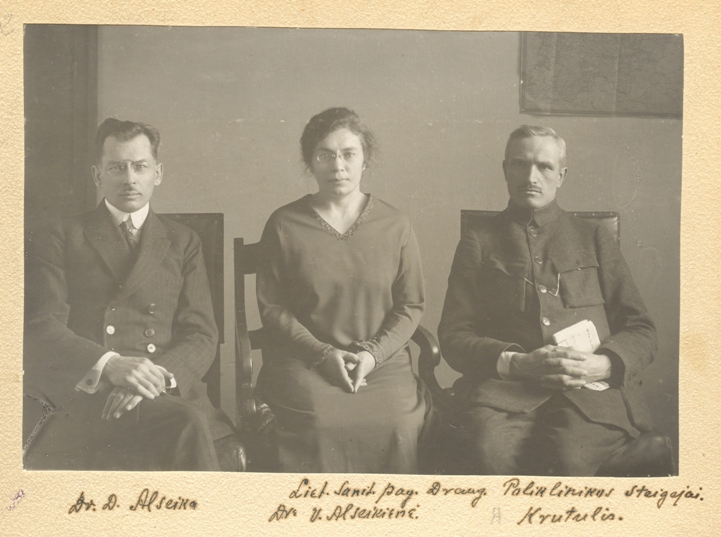
Founders of Lithuanian Sanitary Aid Society around 1922–1924

In early 1918, Minsk was occupied by the Germans. At the time, two Lithuanian physicians husband Danielius Alseika and wife Veronika Alseikienė worked at a war hospital which was not evacuated to Russia. Together with Antanas Krutulys and others, they established the Lithuanian Sanitary Aid Society. Through Alseikienė's acquaintance from the university, German officer Werner Miller, the society obtained permission to provide sanitary inspections and vaccinations to numerous war refugees who traveled through Minsk attempting to return from Russia. Due to outbreaks of infectious diseases, the refugees needed to obtain a sanitary inspection certificate to avoid quarantine. The society provides such certificates for a small fee. Using the collected funds, the society cheaply purchased equipment and inventory of the war hospital. It then relocated and established a hospital in Vilnius.

In July 1918, 12 or 18 train cars worth of medical inventory was transported to Vilnius. The Lithuanian Sanitary Aid Society, which at the time had 36 members, opened a hospital on the present-day Vilnius Street in November 1918. The hospital had 30 rooms, including a pharmacy, laboratory, x-ray and surgery rooms. At the time, the hospital employed six university-educated doctors: Danielius Alseika (ear, nose, and throat specialist), Veronika Alseikienė (ophthalmologist), Julija Biliūnienė (dentist), Vladas Kairiūkštis (internist), Alexander Helmut Otto Hagentorn (surgeon), and P. Ratomski (gynecologist). The hospital charged 10 or 15 ostmarks per day. A doctor's visit cost 3 ostmarks.

=== Activities ===
The hospital continued to function despite successive changes of political regimes in Vilnius which was at the center of the Polish–Lithuanian War. Several hospital employees, including Alseika and Krutulys, were arrested and briefly imprisoned. The political situation stabilized only when Vilnius was incorporated into the Second Polish Republic in 1922. Due to the acrimonious dispute between Lithuania and Poland over the Vilnius Region, the society and the hospital were one of a few Lithuanian institutions active in the city and the region and faced political pressure from the Polish government. For example, pharmacies were not allowed to fill prescriptions written by the hospital. In 1938, hospital director Vytautas Legeika was sued by Polish authorities for renting the hospital building personally to Legeika without proper government permits.

During 1923, the hospital treated 1,594 inpatients and 28,014 outpatients. In 1924, the hospital employed 14 doctors, 8 nurses, 5 administrative employees, and 25 others. In total, the hospital treated some 300,000 patients. Among them were Mečislovas Davainis-Silvestraitis (died at the hospital on 31 May 1919) and Jonas Basanavičius (died at the hospital on 16 February 1927). The hospital did not accept patients of infectious diseases and did not provide maternity care. The society also published popular booklets on common diseases and their prevention (e.g. about trachoma and tuberculosis in 1936), organized lectures, and other events.

It received no financial support from the government and provided many treatments for free. Therefore, the hospital struggled financially. Due to financial difficulties, intrigues, and disagreements, Veronika Alseikienė moved to Kaunas in independent Lithuania in 1932. Her husband Alseika remained in Vilnius and continued to head the hospital. In 1933, he stepped down as director of the hospital and was replaced by Vytautas Legeika but continued to chair the Lithuanian Sanitary Aid Society. In May 1936, Alseika died due to chronic radiation syndrome caused by insufficient shielding of x-ray machines. Legeika became the new chairman of the society.

Despite financial difficulties and the global Great Depression, the society decided to move the hospital from expensive rented premises to its own building in 1933. The new building was located on the present-day Gediminas Avenue facing Lukiškės Square. It was purchased for $18,000 (equivalent to $447,686 in 2025) which was raised from various individuals and Lithuanian societies. The building previously housed a merchant's club and was not suited for a hospital. Therefore, it needed extensive renovations which were completed in January 1936. The society also raised 22,000 złoty and $15,000 for renovations. Since the society wanted to establish a modern well-equipped hospital, these initial budgets were likely exceeded. The new hospital had modern equipment for physical and hydrotherapy.

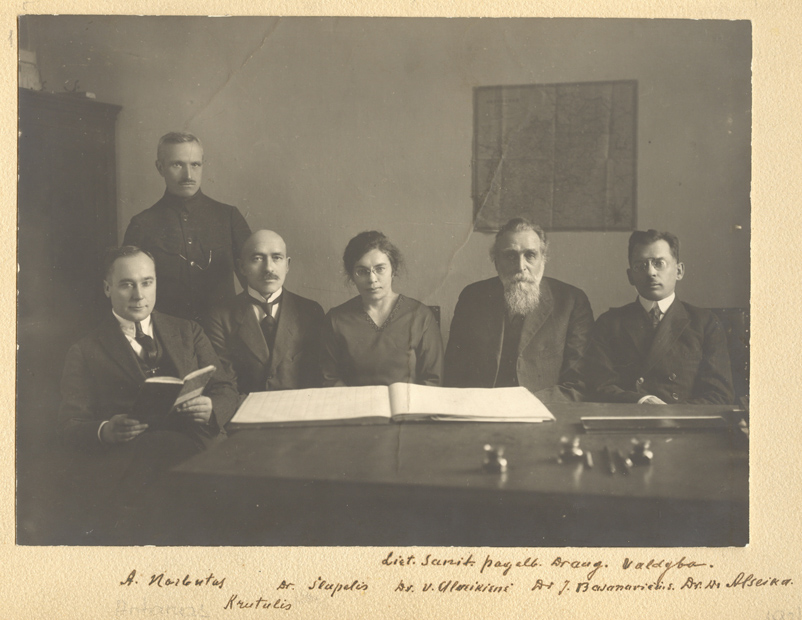
Board of the Lithuanian Sanitary Aid Society around 1922–1924. Alseikienė sits in the middle and Alseika sits on the right

In 1940, the hospital employed 14 doctors. At the time, it had nine private patient rooms, seven shared rooms, and eight doctor's offices. Since its archives were lost, little is known about the circumstances of the society's disbandment. It is believed that the hospital ceased operations around 1941.

== Personnel ==
Over the years, many individuals were members of the board of the Lithuanian Sanitary Aid Society.

In 1918, the board included chairman Alseika and members doctors Juozas Bagdonas, Vladas Kairiūkštis, Veronika Alseikienė, Antanas Vileišis, Vladas Bagdonas, pharmacist Juozas Dyša, and Pijus Mičiulis.

Around 1922–1924, board members included Alseika, Alseikienė, Jonas Basanavičius, Antanas Krutulys, Jurgis Šlapelis, and A. Narbutas. In the 1930s, new board members included Povilas Čibiras, Marija Šlapelienė, Povilas Kazarija.

Society members included priests Vincentas Borisevičius and Vladas Mironas.
