= Marijampolis =

- Village
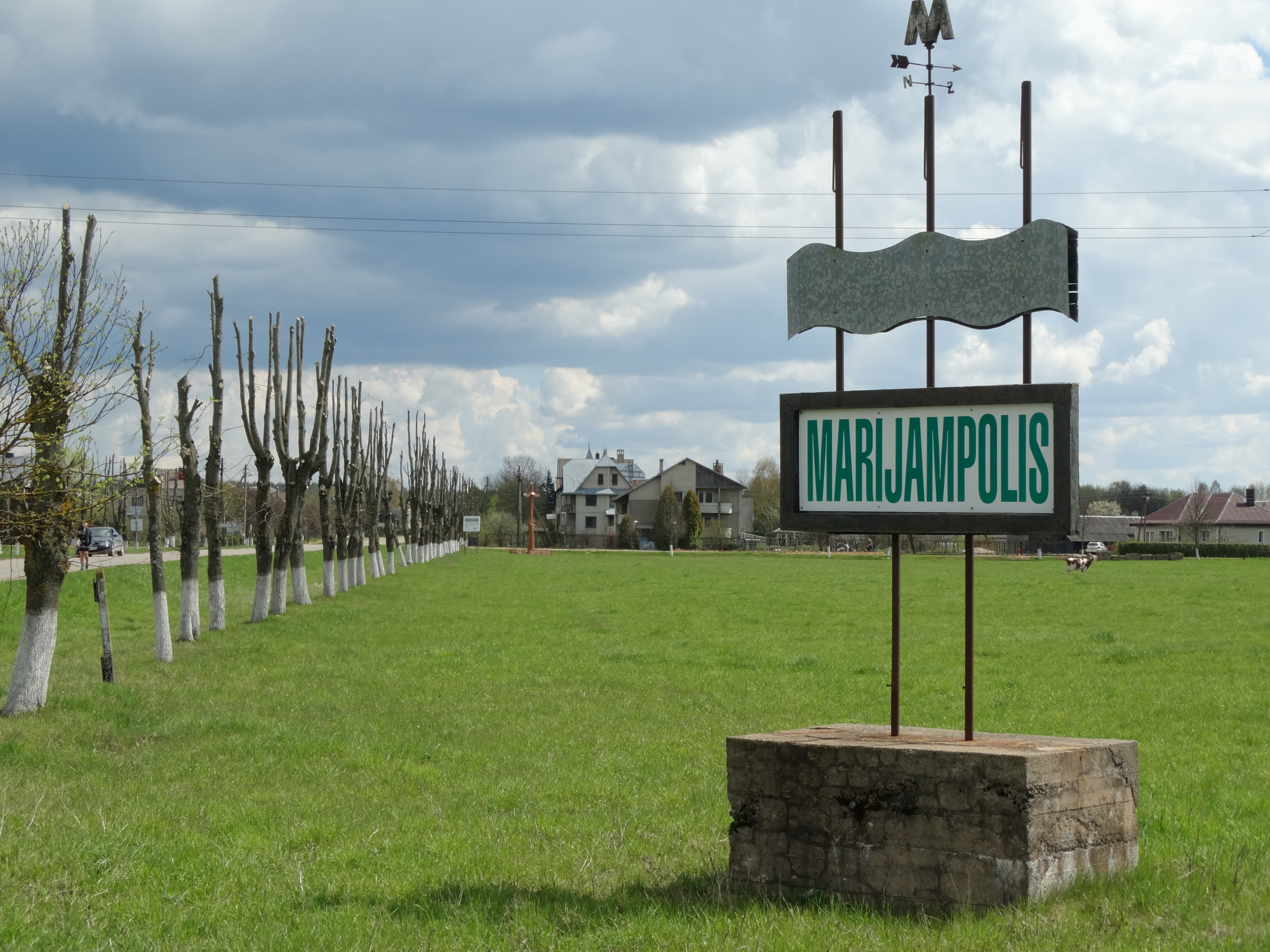
- Marijampolis decorative road sign

- Coat of arms

- Location of Marijampolis
- Coordinates: 54°31′59″N 25°19′19″E
- Country: Lithuania
- County: Vilnius County
- Municipality: Vilnius District Municipality
- Eldership: Marijampolis eldership

Population (2011)
  - Total: 870
- Time zone: UTC+2 (EET)
  - Summer (DST): UTC+3 (EEST)

Marijampolis is a village in Vilnius District Municipality, Lithuania, it is located only about 8 kilometres (5.0 mi) south of Vilnius city municipality. According to the 2011 census, it had population of 870, an increase from 693 in 1989.

== History ==
Already in the early 1900s, pupils were taught in Lithuanian language in Marijampolis. Lithuanian language school was opened in 1921, but was closed down in the early 1930s because of tensions between Lithuania and Poland. During the Soviet occupation, Marijampolis was one of the main centers of Lithuanian culture in the south-eastern part of Lithuanian USR and Western Belorussia, the territories, which before the outbreak of the World War II belonged to the interwar Poland, but were claimed by interbellum Lithuania on historic and ethnographic grounds. After the Soviet invasion of Poland, part of Vilnius region was transferred from occupying USSR to Lithuania on the grounds of Soviet–Lithuanian Peace Treaty of 1920 and the new Soviet–Lithuanian Mutual Assistance Treaty. The remaining part of Vilnius region was merged with the Byelorussian Soviet Socialist Republic. Lithuanian language islands were left on the other side of the border. After the war, Soviet authorities did not allow to establish Lithuanian language schools in Lithuanian ethnographic villages in Western Belorussia and pupils from those villages were schooled in Lithuanian in Marijampolis, were a dormitory for Lithuanian schoolchildren was opened. Marijampolis served as a schooling center of the region in Lithuanian language.

Despite serving as Lithuanian cultural center for a brief period of time, Marijampolis eldership is a very diverse, with Lithuanians making only 23,6% of the population, while Lithuanian Poles constitute 62,6% and Russians - 9,0% as according to the 2011 census. The number of inhabitants in the elderate is growing because of recent suburbanization – from 3157 in 2001 to 3395 in 2011 and 3675 in 2020.
