= Marija Gimbutas =

Lithuanian archaeologist (1921–1994)

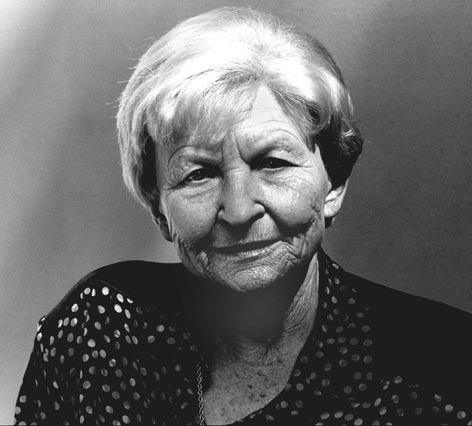
- Gimbutas at the Frauenmuseum Wiesbaden, Germany 1993
- Born: Marija Birutė Alseikaitė; January 23, 1921; Vilnius, Central Lithuania
- Died: February 2, 1994 (aged 73); Los Angeles, California, U.S.
- Other name: Lithuanian: Marija Gimbutienė
- Education: Vilnius University
- Occupation: Archaeologist
- Years active: 1949–1991
- Employer: University of California, Los Angeles
- Known for: Kurgan hypothesis
- Notable work: The Goddesses and Gods of Old Europe (1974); The Language of the Goddess (1989); The Civilization of the Goddess (1991); The Balts (1961); The Slavs (1971)
- Parents: Danielius Alseika (father); Veronika Alseikienė (mother)

Marija Gimbutas (Lithuanian: Marija Birutė Alseikaitė-Gimbutienė, pronounced ['ɡʲɪmbutas]; January 23, 1921 – February 2, 1994) was a Lithuanian archaeologist and anthropologist known for her research into the Neolithic and Bronze Age cultures of "Old Europe" and for her Kurgan hypothesis, which located the Proto-Indo-European homeland in the Pontic Steppe.

== Biography ==
=== Early life ===
Marija Gimbutas was born as Marija Birutė Alseikaitė to Veronika Janulaitytė-Alseikienė and Danielius Alseika in Vilnius, the capital of the Republic of Central Lithuania; her parents were members of the Lithuanian intelligentsia.

Her mother received a doctorate in ophthalmology at the Friedrich Wilhelm University of Berlin in 1908, while her father received his medical degree from the Imperial University of Dorpat in 1910. After Lithuania regained independence in 1918, Gimbutas's parents organized the Lithuanian Association of Sanitary Aid which founded the first Lithuanian hospital in the capital.

During this period, her father also served as the publisher of the newspaper Vilniaus žodis and the cultural magazine Vilniaus šviesa and was an outspoken proponent of Lithuanian independence during the Polish–Lithuanian War.

Gimbutas's parents were connoisseurs of traditional Lithuanian folk arts and frequently invited contemporary musicians, writers, and authors to their home, including Vydūnas, Juozas Tumas-Vaižgantas, and Jonas Basanavičius. With regard to her strong cultural upbringing, Gimbutas said:

I had the opportunity to get acquainted with writers and artists such as Vydūnas, Tumas-Vaižgantas, even Basanavičius, who was taken care of by my parents. When I was four or five years old, I would sit in Basanavičius's easy chair and I would feel fine. And later, throughout my entire life, Basanavičius's collected folklore remained extraordinarily important for me.

In 1931, Gimbutas settled with her parents in Kaunas, the temporary capital of Lithuania. After her parents separated that year, she lived with her mother and brother, Vytautas, in Kaunas. Five years later, her father died suddenly. At her father's deathbed, Gimbutas pledged that she would study to become a scholar: "All of a sudden I had to think what I shall be, what I shall do with my life. I had been so reckless in sports—swimming for miles, skating, bicycle riding. I changed completely and began to read."

=== Emigration and life abroad ===
In 1941, she married architect Jurgis Gimbutas. During the Second World War, Gimbutas lived under the Soviet occupation (1940–41) and then the German occupation (1941–43).

Gimbutas' first daughter, Danutė, was born in June 1942. One year after the birth of their daughter, the young Gimbutas family, in the face of an advancing Soviet army, fled the country to areas controlled by Nazi Germany, first to Vienna and then to Innsbruck and Bavaria. In her reflection of this turbulent period, Gimbutas remarked, "Life just twisted me like a little plant, but my work was continuous in one direction."

While holding a postdoctoral fellowship at Tübingen the following year, Gimbutas gave birth to her second daughter, Živilė. In the 1950s, the Gimbutas family left Germany and relocated to the United States, where Gimbutas had a successful academic career. Her third daughter, Rasa Julija, was born in 1954 in Boston.

Gimbutas died in Los Angeles in 1994, at age 73. Soon afterwards, she was interred in Kaunas's Petrašiūnai Cemetery.

== Career ==
=== Education and academic appointments ===
From 1936, Gimbutas participated in ethnographic expeditions to record traditional folklore and studied Lithuanian beliefs and rituals of death. She graduated with honors from Aušra Gymnasium in Kaunas in 1938 and enrolled in the Vytautas Magnus University the same year, where she studied linguistics in the Department of Philology. She then attended the University of Vilnius to pursue graduate studies in archaeology (under Jonas Puzinas), linguistics, ethnology, folklore and literature.

In 1942 she completed her master's thesis, "Modes of Burial in Lithuania in the Iron Age", with honors. She received her Master of Arts degree from the University of Vilnius, Lithuania, in 1942.

In 1946, Gimbutas received a doctorate in archaeology, with minors in ethnology and history of religion, from the University of Tübingen with her dissertation "Prehistoric Burial Rites in Lithuania" ("Die Bestattung in Litauen in der vorgeschichtlichen Zeit"), which was published later that year. She often said that she had the dissertation under one arm and her child under the other arm when she and her husband fled the city of Kaunas, Lithuania, in the face of an advancing Soviet army in 1944.

From 1947 to 1949, she did postgraduate work at Heidelberg University and the Ludwig-Maximilians-Universität München.

After arriving in the United States in the 1950s, Gimbutas immediately went to work at Harvard University translating Eastern European archaeological texts. She then became a lecturer in the Department of Anthropology. In 1955 she was made a Fellow of Harvard's Peabody Museum. As a woman scholar, Gimbutas was banned from using Harvard's library which was reserved for men only. This was a factor in her leaving Harvard for UCLA.

Gimbutas then taught at UCLA, where she became Professor of European Archaeology and Indo-European Studies in 1964 and Curator of Old World Archaeology in 1965. In 1993, Gimbutas received an honorary doctorate at Vytautas Magnus University in Kaunas, Lithuania.

=== Kurgan hypothesis ===
In 1956 Gimbutas introduced her Kurgan hypothesis, which combined archaeological study of the distinctive Kurgan burial mounds with linguistics to unravel some problems in the study of the Proto-Indo-European (PIE) speaking peoples, whom she dubbed the "Kurgans"; namely, to account for their origin and to trace their migrations into Europe. This hypothesis, and her method of bridging the disciplines, has had a significant impact on Indo-European studies.

During the 1950s and early 1960s, Gimbutas earned a reputation as a world-class specialist on Bronze Age Europe, as well as on Lithuanian folk art and the prehistory of the Balts and Slavs, partly summed up in her definitive opus, Bronze Age Cultures of Central and Eastern Europe (1965). In her work she reinterpreted European prehistory in light of her backgrounds in linguistics, ethnology, and the history of religions, and challenged many traditional assumptions about the beginnings of European civilization.

As a professor of European Archaeology and Indo-European Studies at UCLA from 1963 to 1989, Gimbutas directed major excavations of Neolithic sites in southeastern Europe between 1967 and 1980, including Anzabegovo, near Štip, Republic of North Macedonia, and Sitagroi and Achilleion in Thessaly (Greece). Digging through layers of earth representing a period of time before contemporary estimates for Neolithic habitation in Europe – where other archaeologists would not have expected further finds – she unearthed a great number of artifacts of daily life and religion or spirituality, which she researched and documented throughout her career.

Three genetic studies in 2015 gave support to the Kurgan theory of Gimbutas regarding the Indo-European Urheimat. According to those studies, Y-chromosome haplogroups R1b and R1a, now the most common in Europe (R1a is also common in South Asia) would have expanded from the Russian steppes, along with the Indo European languages; they also detected an autosomal component present in modern Europeans which was not present in Neolithic Europeans, which would have been introduced with paternal lineages R1b and R1a, as well as Indo-European languages.

=== Late archaeology ===
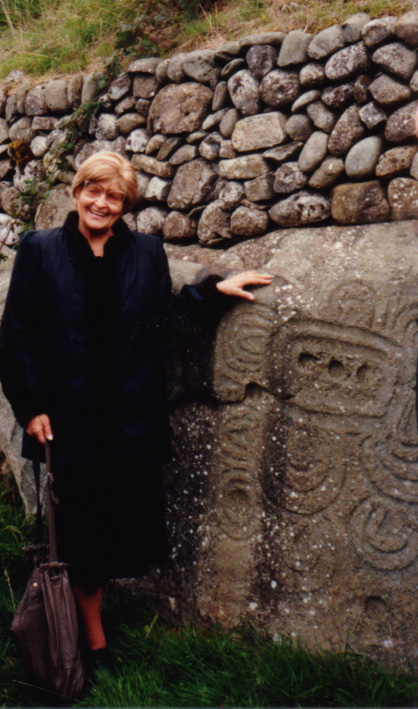
Marija Gimbutas by Kerbstone 52, at the back of Newgrange, County Meath, Ireland, in September 1989

Gimbutas gained fame and notoriety in the English-speaking world with her last three English-language books: The Goddesses and Gods of Old Europe (1974); The Language of the Goddess (1989), which inspired an exhibition in Wiesbaden, 1993–94; and the last of the three, The Civilization of the Goddess (1991), which, based on her documented archaeological findings, presented an overview of her conclusions about Neolithic cultures across Europe: housing patterns, social structure, art, religion, and the nature of literacy.

The Goddess trilogy articulated what Gimbutas saw as the differences between the Old European system, which she considered goddess- and woman-centered (gynocentric), and the Bronze Age Indo-European patriarchal ("androcratic") culture which supplanted it. According to her interpretations, gynocentric (or matristic) societies were peaceful, honored women, and espoused economic equality. The androcratic, or male-dominated, Kurgan peoples, on the other hand, invaded Europe and imposed upon its natives the hierarchical rule of male warriors.

=== Influence ===
Gimbutas's work, along with that of her colleague, mythologist Joseph Campbell, is housed in the OPUS Archives and Research Center on the campus of the Pacifica Graduate Institute in Carpinteria, California. The library includes Gimbutas's extensive collection on the topics of archaeology, mythology, folklore, art and linguistics. The Gimbutas Archives house over 12,000 images personally taken by Gimbutas of sacred figures, as well as research files on Neolithic cultures of Old Europe.

Mary Mackey has written four historical novels based on Gimbutas's research: The Year the Horses Came, The Horses at the Gate, The Fires of Spring, and The Village of Bones.

== Reception ==
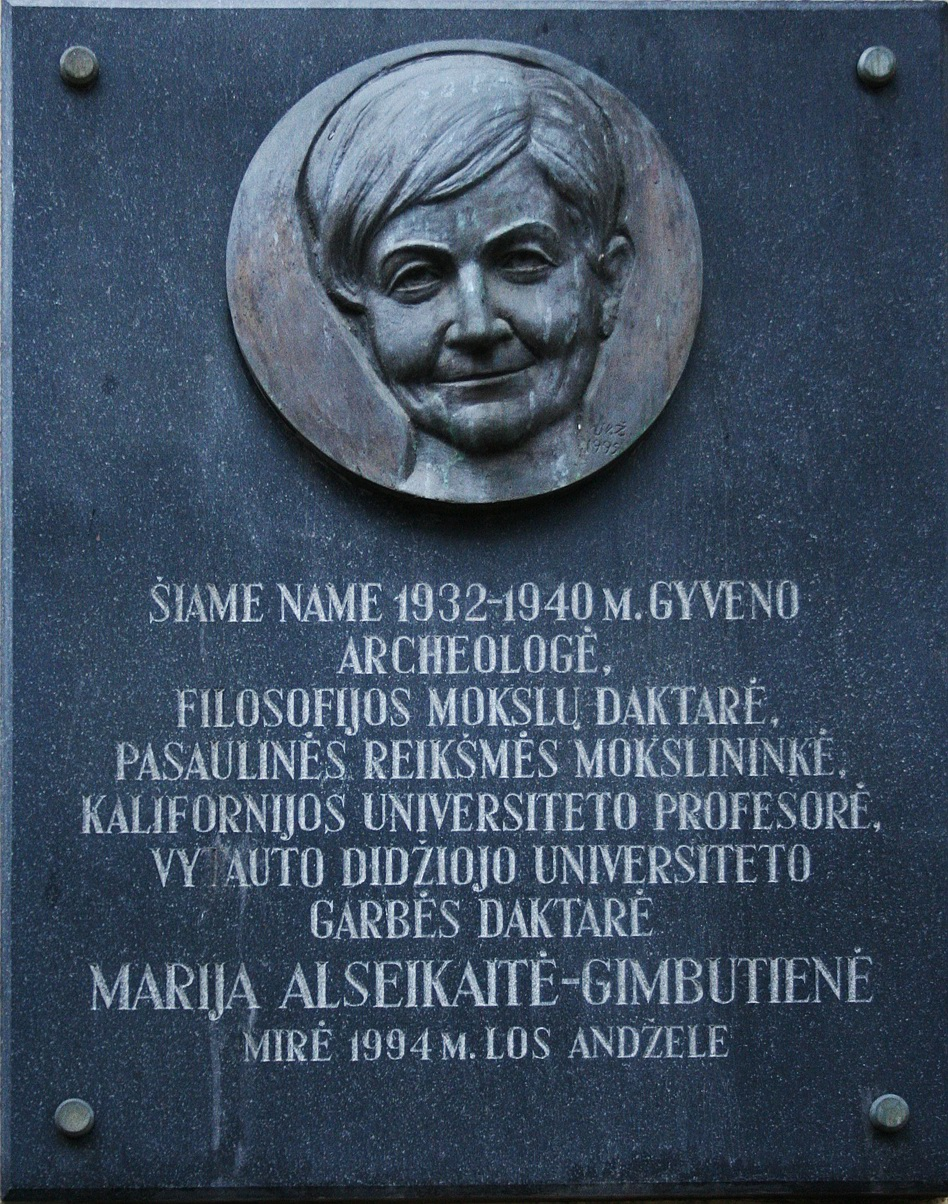
Marija Gimbutienė commemorative plaque in Kaunas, Mickevičiaus Street

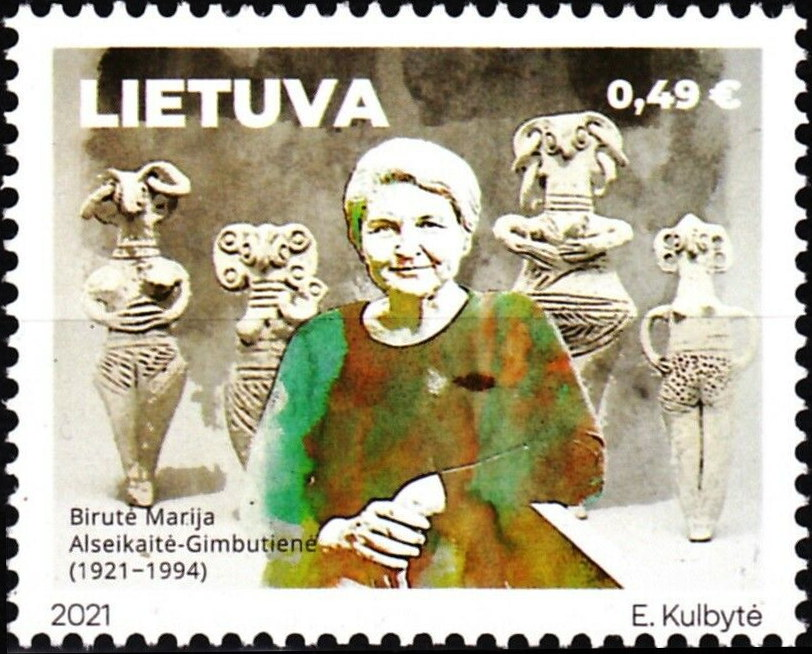
Marija Gimbutienė on a 2021 stamp of Lithuania

Joseph Campbell and Ashley Montagu each compared the importance of Gimbutas's output to the historical importance of the Rosetta Stone in deciphering Egyptian hieroglyphs. Campbell provided a foreword to a new edition of Gimbutas's The Language of the Goddess (1989) before he died, and often said how profoundly he regretted that her research on the Neolithic cultures of Europe had not been available when he was writing The Masks of God. The ecofeminist Charlene Spretnak argued in 2011 that a "backlash" against Gimbutas's work had been orchestrated, starting in the last years of her life and following her death.

Mainstream archaeology dismissed Gimbutas's later works. Anthropologist Bernard Wailes (1934–2012) of the University of Pennsylvania commented to The New York Times that most of Gimbutas's peers believe her to be "immensely knowledgeable but not very good in critical analysis. ... She amasses all the data and then leaps from it to conclusions without any intervening argument." He said that most archaeologists consider her to be an eccentric.

David W. Anthony has praised Gimbutas's insights regarding the Indo-European Urheimat, but also disputed Gimbutas's assertion that there was a widespread peaceful society before the Kurgan incursion, noting that Europe had hillforts and weapons, and presumably warfare, long before the Kurgan. A standard textbook of European prehistory corroborates this point, stating that warfare existed in neolithic Europe and that adult males were given preferential treatment in burial rites.

Peter Ucko and Andrew Fleming were two early critics of the "Goddess" theory, with which Gimbutas later came to be associated. Ucko, in his 1968 monograph Anthropomorphic figurines of predynastic Egypt warned against unwarranted inferences about the meanings of statues. He notes, for example, that early Egyptian figurines of women holding their breasts had been taken as "obviously" significant of maternity or fertility, but the Pyramid Texts revealed that in Egypt this was the female gesture of grief.

Fleming, in his 1969 paper "The Myth of the Mother Goddess", questioned the practice of identifying neolithic figures as female when they were not clearly distinguished as male and took issue with other aspects of the "Goddess" interpretation of Neolithic stone carvings and burial practices. Cynthia Eller also discusses the place of Gimbutas in injecting the idea into feminism in her 2000 book The Myth of Matriarchal Prehistory.

The 2009 book Knossos and the Prophets of Modernism by Cathy Gere examines the political influence on archaeology more generally. Through the example of Knossos on the island of Crete, which had been represented as the paradigm of a pacifist, matriarchal and sexually free society, Gere claims that archaeology can easily slip into reflecting what people want to see, rather than teaching people about an unfamiliar past.

== Bibliography ==
=== Monographs ===
- Gimbutas, Marija (1946). Die Bestattung in Litauen in der vorgeschichtlichen Zeit. Tübingen: H. Laupp.
- Gimbutas, Marija (1956). The Prehistory of Eastern Europe, Part I: Mesolithic, Neolithic and Copper Age Cultures in Russia and the Baltic Area. Cambridge, Mass.: Peabody Museum.
- Gimbutas, Marija & R. Ehrich (1957). COWA Survey and Bibliography, Area – Central Europe. Cambridge: Harvard University Press.
- Gimbutas, Marija (1958). Ancient symbolism in Lithuanian folk art. Philadelphia: American Folklore Society.
- Gimbutas, Marija (1958). Rytprusiu ir Vakaru Lietuvos Priesistorines Kulturos Apzvalga [A Survey of Prehistory of East Prussia and western Lithuania]. New York: Studia Lituaica I.
- Gimbutas, Marija & R. Ehrich (1959). COWA Survey and Bibliography, Area 2 – Scandinavia. Cambridge: Harvard University.
- Gimbutas, Marija (1963). The Balts. London: Thames & Hudson.
- Gimbutas, Marija (1965). Bronze Age cultures in Central and Eastern Europe. The Hague/London: Mouton.
- Gimbutas, Marija (1971). The Slavs. London: Thames & Hudson.
- Gimbutas, Marija (1974). Obre and Its Place in Old Europe. Sarajevo: Zemalski Museum.
- Gimbutas, Marija (1974). The Goddesses and Gods of Old Europe, 7000 to 3500 BC: Myths, Legends and Cult Images. London: Thames & Hudson.
- Gimbutas, Marija (1981). Grotta Scaloria: Resoconto sulle ricerche del 1980 relative agli scavi del 1979. Manfredonia: Amministrazione comunale.
- Gimbutas, Marija (1985). Baltai priešistoriniais laikais: etnogenezė, materialinė kultūra ir mitologija. Vilnius: Mokslas.
- Gimbutas, Marija (1989). The Language of the Goddess: Unearthing the Hidden Symbols of Western Civilization. San Francisco: Harper & Row.
- Gimbutas, Marija (1991). The Civilization of the Goddess: The World of Old Europe. San Francisco: Harper.
- Gimbutas, Marija (1992). Die Ethnogenese der europäischen Indogermanen. Innsbruck: Institut für Sprachwissenschaft der Universität Innsbruck.
- Gimbutas, Marija (1994). Das Ende Alteuropas: Der Einfall von Steppennomaden aus Südrussland und die Indogermanisierung Mitteleuropas. Innsbruck: Institut für Sprachwissenschaft der Universität Innsbruck.
- Gimbutas, Marija (1999). The Living Goddesses. Edited and supplemented by Miriam Robbins Dexter. Berkeley/Los Angeles: University of California Press.

=== Edited volumes ===
- 1974: Gimbutas, Marija, ed. Obre, Neolithic Sites in Bosnia. Sarajevo: A. Archaeologic.
- 1976: Gimbutas, Marija, ed. Neolithic Macedonia as reflected by excavation at Anza, southeast Yugoslavia. Los Angeles: Institute of Archaeology, University of California.
- 1986: Colin Renfrew, Marija Gimbutas, & Ernestine S. Elster, eds. Excavations at Sitagroi, a prehistoric village in northeast Greece. Vol. 1. Los Angeles : Institute of Archaeology, University of California.
- 1989: Marija Gimbutas, Shan Winn, & Daniel Shimabuku, eds. Achilleion: a Neolithic settlement in Thessaly, Greece, 6400–5600 B.C. Los Angeles: Institute of Archaeology, University of California.

=== Articles ===
- 1960: "Culture Change in Europe at the Start of the Second Millennium B.C. A Contribution to the Indo-European Problem", in Selected Papers of the Fifth International Congress of Anthropological and Ethnological Sciences: Philadelphia, September 1–9, 1956. Ed. A. F. C. Wallace. Philadelphia: University of Philadelphia Press, 1960, pp. 540–52.
- 1961: "Notes on the chronology and expansion of the Pit-grave culture", in L'Europe à la fin de l'Âge de la pierre. Eds. J. Bohm & S. J. De Laet. Prague: Czechoslovak Academy of Sciences, 1961, pp. 193–200.
- 1963: "The Indo-Europeans: archaeological problems", American Anthropologist 65 (1963): 815–36 doi:10.1525/aa.1963.65.4.02a00030
- 1970: "Proto-Indo-European Culture: The Kurgan Culture during the Fifth, Fourth, and Third Millennia B.C.", in Indo-European and Indo-Europeans: Papers Presented at the Third Indo-European Conference at the University of Pennsylvania. Eds. George Cardona, Henry M. Hoenigswald, & Alfred Senn. Philadelphia: University of Pennsylvania Press, 1970, pp. 155–97.
- 1973: "Old Europe c. 7000–3500 BC: The Earliest European Civilization Before the Infiltration of the Indo-European Peoples", Journal of Indo-European Studies (JIES) 1 (1973): 1–21.
- 1977: "The First Wave of Eurasian Steppe Pastoralists into Copper Age Europe", JIES 5 (1977): 277–338.
- "Gold Treasure at Varna", Archaeology 30(1) (1977): 44–51.
- 1979: "The Three Waves of Kurgan People into Old Europe, 4500–2500 BC", Archives suisses d'anthropologie genérale 43(2) (1979): 113–37.
- 1980: "The transformation of European and Anatolian culture 4500–2500 BC and its legacy, Part I", JIES 8, nos. 3–4 (1980): 1–230.
- "The Kurgan wave #2 (c.3400–3200 BC) into Europe and the following transformation of culture", JIES 8 (1980): 273–315.
- "The Temples of Old Europe", Archaeology 33(6) (1980): 41–50.
- 1981: "The transformation of European and Anatolian culture 4500–2500 B.C. and its legacy, Part III", JIES 9 (1981): 1–175.
- 1982: "Old Europe in the Fifth Millennium B.C.: The European Situation on the Arrival of Indo-Europeans", in The Indo-Europeans in the Fourth and Third Millennia BC. Ed. Edgar C. Polomé. Ann Arbor, Mich.: Karoma Publishers, 1982, pp. 1–60.
- "Women and Culture in Goddess-oriented Old Europe", in The Politics of Women's Spirituality. Ed. Charlene Spretnak. New York: Doubleday, 1982, pp. 22–31.
- "Vulvas, Breasts, and Buttocks of the Goddess Creatress: Commentary on the Origins of Art", in The Shape of the Past: Studies in Honor of Franklin D. Murphy. Eds. Giorgio Buccellati & Charles Speroni. Los Angeles: UCLA Institute of Archaeology, 1982.
- 1985: "Primary and Secondary Homeland of the Indo-Europeans: Comments on Gamkrelidze–Ivanov Articles", JIES 13(1–2) (1985): 185–202.
- 1986: "Kurgan Culture and the Horse", critique of the article "The 'Kurgan Culture', Indo-European origins and the domestication of the horse: a reconsideration" by David W. Anthony (same issue, pp. 291–313), Current Anthropology 27(4) (1986): 305–07.
- "Remarks on the ethnogenesis of the Indo-Europeans in Europe", in Ethnogenese europäischer Völker. Eds. W. Bernhard & A. Kandler-Palsson. Stuttgart / New York: Gustav Fische Verlag, 1986, pp. 5–19.
- 1987: "The Earth Fertility of old Europe", Dialogues d'histoire ancienne, vol. 13, no. 1 (1987): 11–69.
- 1988: "A Review of Archaeology and Language by Colin Renfrew", Current Anthropology 29(3) (Jul 1988): 453–56.
- "Accounting For a Great Change, critique of Archaeology and Language by C. Renfrew", London Times Literary Supplement (Jun 24–30), 1988, p. 714.
- 1989: "The Pre-Christian Religion of Lithuania", in La cristianizzazione della Lituania: atti del Colloquio internazionale di storia ecclesiastica in occasione del VI centenario della Lituania cristiana (1387-1987), Roma, 24-26 giugno 1987. Vatican City: Libreria Editrice Vaticana, 1989.
- 1990: "The Social Structure of the Old Europe. Part II", JIES 18 (1990): 225–284.
- "The Collision of Two Ideologies", in When Worlds Collide: Indo-Europeans and Pre-Indo-Europeans. Eds. T. L. Markey & A. C. Greppin. Ann Arbor, Mich.: Kasoma, 1990, pp. 171–78.
- "Wall Paintings of Çatal Hüyük, 8th–7th Millennia B.C.", The Review of Archaeology, 11(2) (1990): 1–5.
- 1992: "The Chronologies of Eastern Europe: Neolithic through Early Bronze Age", in Chronologies in Old World Archaeology, 3rd edn. Ed. Robert W. Ehrich. Chicago: University of Chicago Press, 1992, pp. 395–406.
- 1993: "The Indo-Europeanization of Europe: the intrusion of steppe pastoralists from south Russia and the transformation of Old Europe", Word 44 (1993): 205–22 doi:10.1080/00437956.1993.11435900

=== Collected articles ===
- Dexter, Miriam Robbins and Karlene Jones-Bley (eds) (1997). The Kurgan culture and the Indo-Europeanization of Europe: Selected articles from 1952 to 1993 by M. Gimbutas. Journal of Indo-European Studies monograph 18. Washington DC: Institute for the Study of Man.

=== Studies in honor ===
- Skomal, Susan Nacev & Edgar C. Polomé (eds) (1987). Proto-Indo-European: The Archaeology of a Linguistic Problem. Studies in Honor of Marija Gimbutas. Journal of Indo-European Studies Monograph No. 001. Washington, D.C.: Institute for the Study of Man.
- Marler, Joan, ed. (1997). From the Realm of the Ancestors: An Anthology in Honor of Marija Gimbutas. Manchester, CT: Knowledge, Ideas & Trends, Inc.
- Dexter, Miriam Robbins and Edgar C. Polomé, eds. (1997). Varia on the Indo-European Past: Papers in Memory of Gimbutas, Marija. Journal of Indo-European Studies Monograph #19. Washington, DC: The Institute for the Study of Man.

== See also ==
- Yamnaya culture
- Vinča script
- Lewis H. Morgan
- J. P. Mallory
- Johann Jakob Bachofen
