= Church of Saint Demetrius of Thessaloniki, Veliko Tarnovo =

- църква "Св. Димитър Солунски", tsarkva "Sv. Dimitar Solunski"
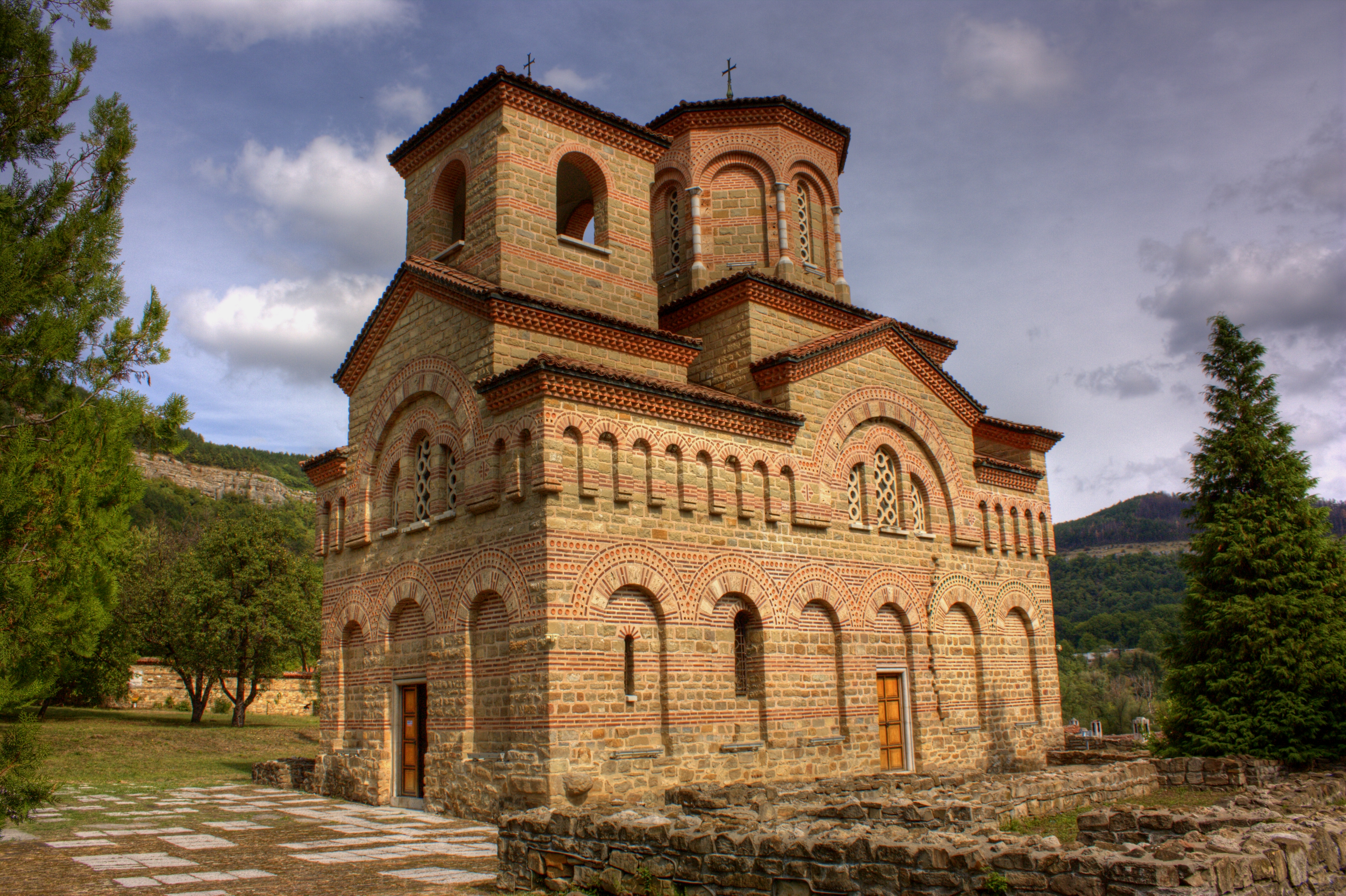
- Church of St Demetrius of Thessaloniki, Veliko Tarnovo
- Church of Saint Demetrius of Thessaloniki, Veliko Tarnovo
- 43°5′16″N 25°38′54″E
- Country: Bulgaria
- Denomination: Bulgarian Orthodox

The Church of Saint Demetrius of Thessaloniki (Bulgarian: църква "Св. Димитър Солунски", tsarkva "Sv. Dimitar Solunski") is a medieval Bulgarian Orthodox church in the city of Veliko Tarnovo in central northern Bulgaria, the former capital of the Second Bulgarian Empire.

== Location ==
The church lies at the northeastern foot of the Trapezitsa and Tsarevets hills, on the right bank of the Yantra River, outside the city's medieval fortifications. Architecturally, it has a pentahedral apse and a cross-domed design with a narthex and a fore-apse space. It was once part of a large monastery and belonged in its southeastern part. The church's exterior is decorated with blind arches and colourful ornaments: glazed rosettes, suns, rhombs and other painted figures. The church was built of stone alternated with three rows of bricks. It is 15.75 by 8.40 metres (51.7 ft × 27.6 ft) in size.

According to the account of Niketas Choniates, the church was the place where the anti-Byzantine Uprising of Asen and Peter was proclaimed in 1185; it was this uprising that led to the reestablishment of the Bulgarian Empire and the proclamation of Tarnovo for its capital. It is theorized that it was a royal church in the early years of the empire and it received donations from members of the Asen dynasty. According to the legend, the nobles (bolyari) Asen and Peter announced that the patron of Thessaloniki, the warrior saint Demetrius, would desert his city and come to Tarnovo to aid the Bulgarian rebels. The brothers built and inaugurated a church in his honour.

The Church of St Demetrius was destroyed in the second half of the 13th century, probably due to an earthquake, but was reconstructed in the 1350s. A single-apse church was built nearby in the 1360s and existed until the 17th century; it used materials from the destroyed Church of St Demetrius. The monastery yard and the destroyed buildings became a predominantly Christian necropolis during the Ottoman rule of Bulgaria. During the Bulgarian National Revival, the church was associated with the leatherworkers' guild.

In the late 18th and early 19th century, the Church of St Demetrius was plundered by robbers. In the second half of the 19th century it was in a very bad condition, which was noted by Bulgarian and foreign researchers, including Felix Philipp Kanitz. An earthquake in 1913 destroyed it completely, leaving only the apse and fragments of the original frescoes.

The Church of St Demetrius of Thessaloniki was reconstructed beginning in 1977–1985 based on the available architectural remains and the example of better preserved Bulgarian churches from the same period. The project was headed by Teofil Teofilov. Of the original church, two layers of frescoes have been preserved: an early one dating either to the church's construction or to the second half of the 14th century and a later one painted after the 14th century.

== Burials ==
- Ivan Asen I of Bulgaria
- Peter IV of Bulgaria

== Gallery ==
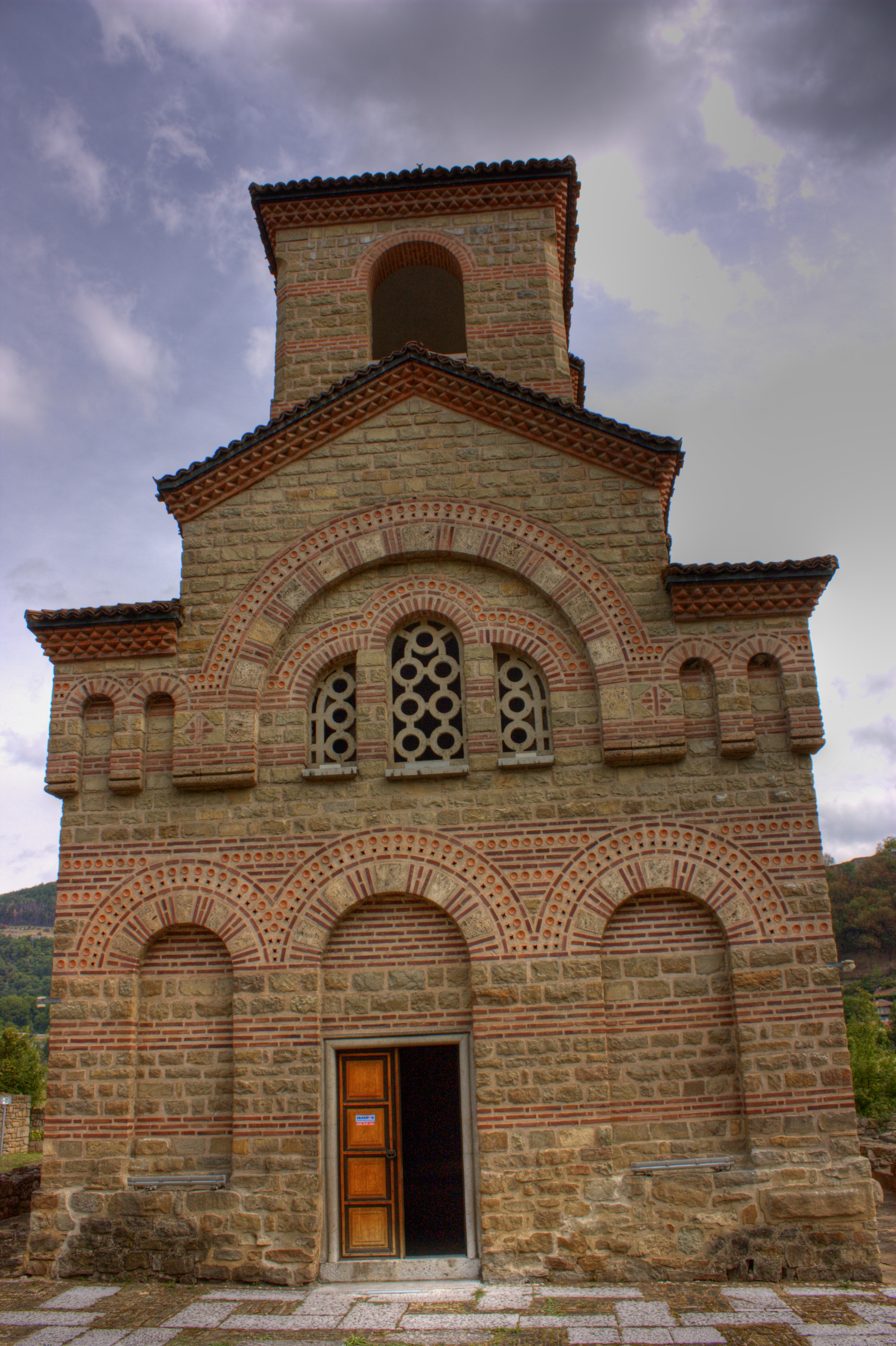

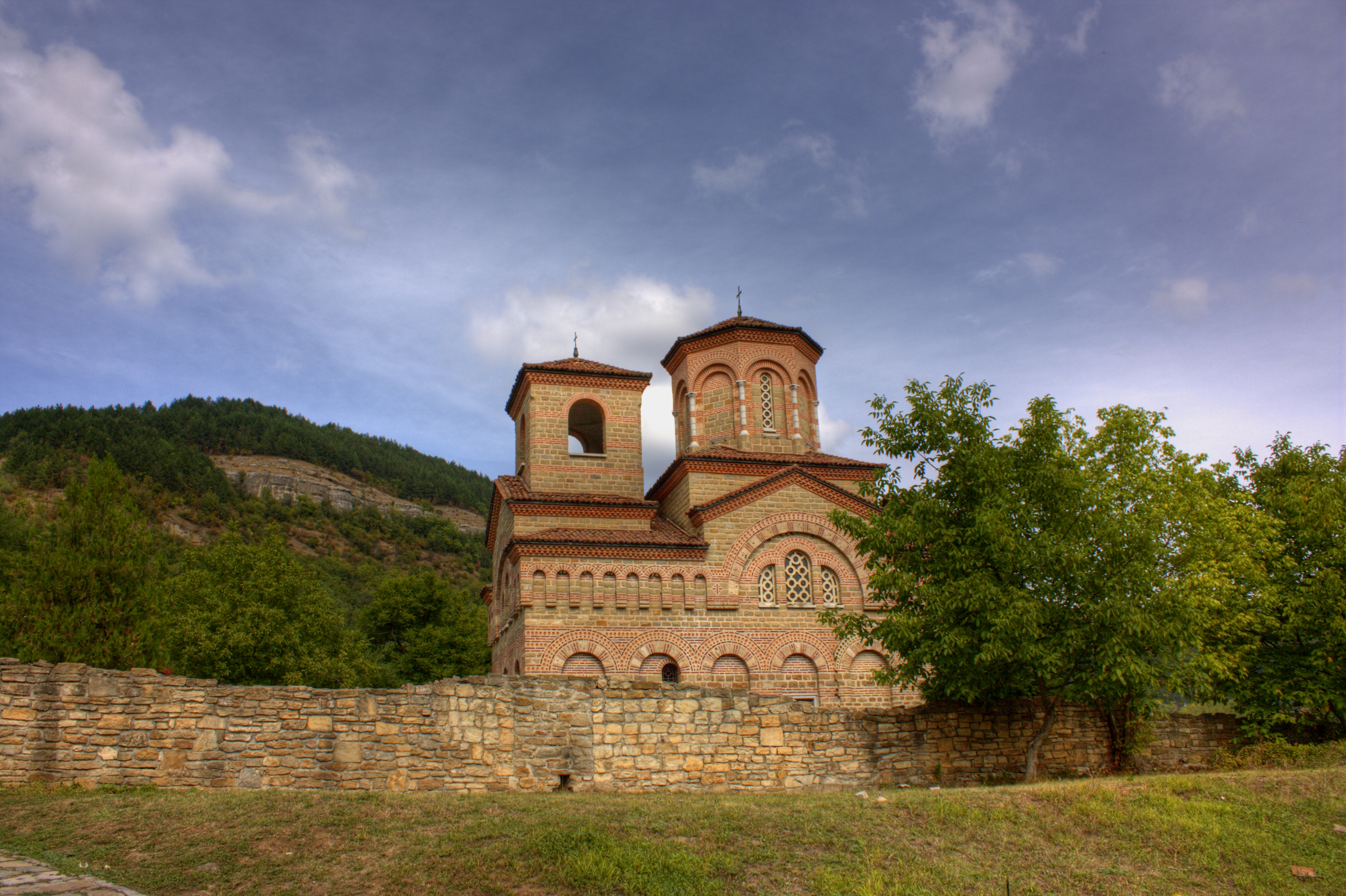

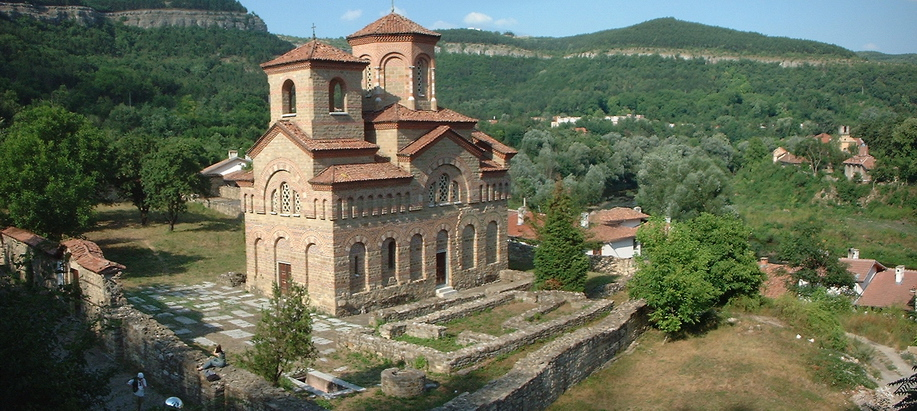

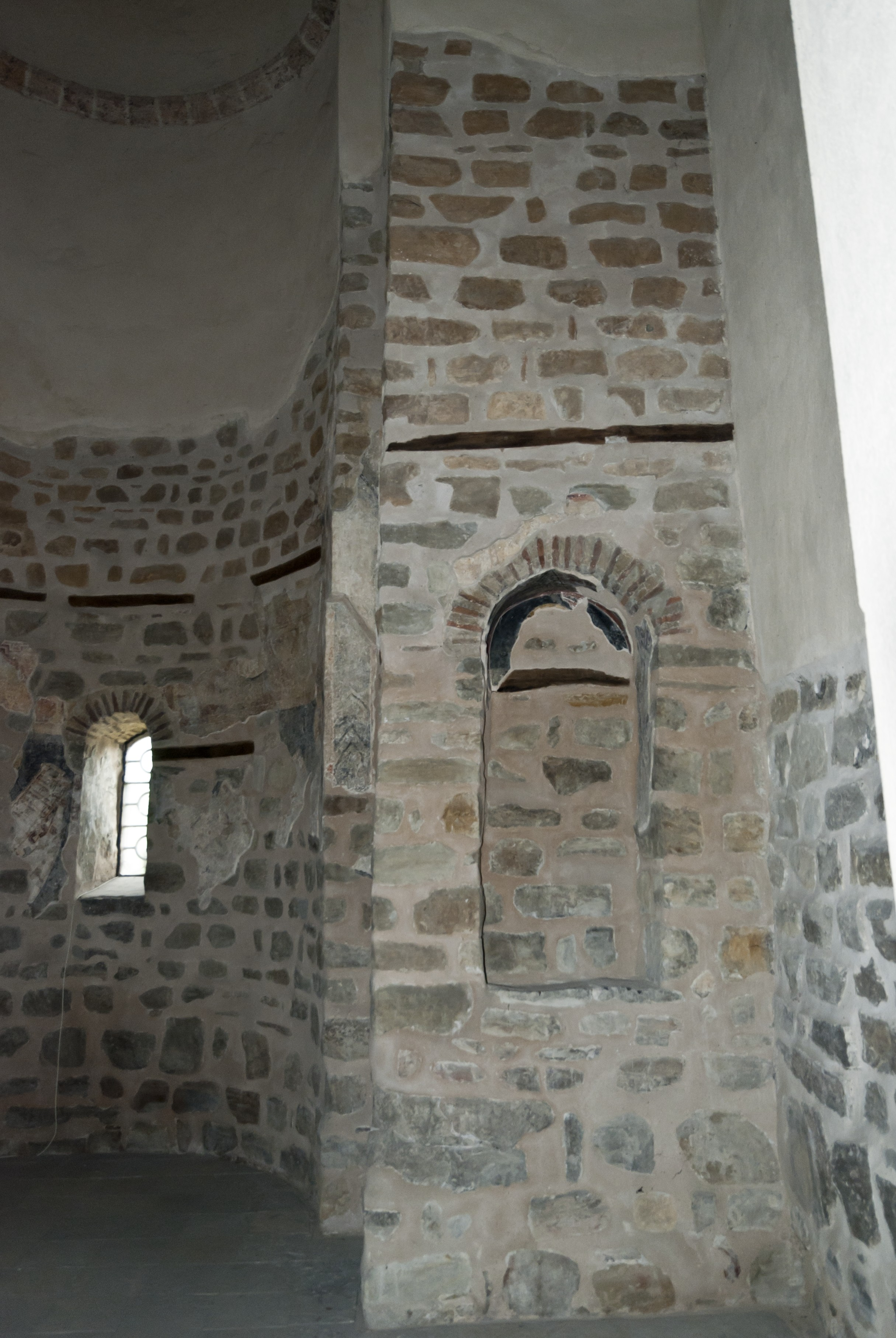

== See also ==
- Church of Demetrius of Thessaloniki, Dubrovo, Russia
