= Kamenskoye Church =

Church in Moscow, Russia

Coordinates: 55.26798°N 36.82761°E

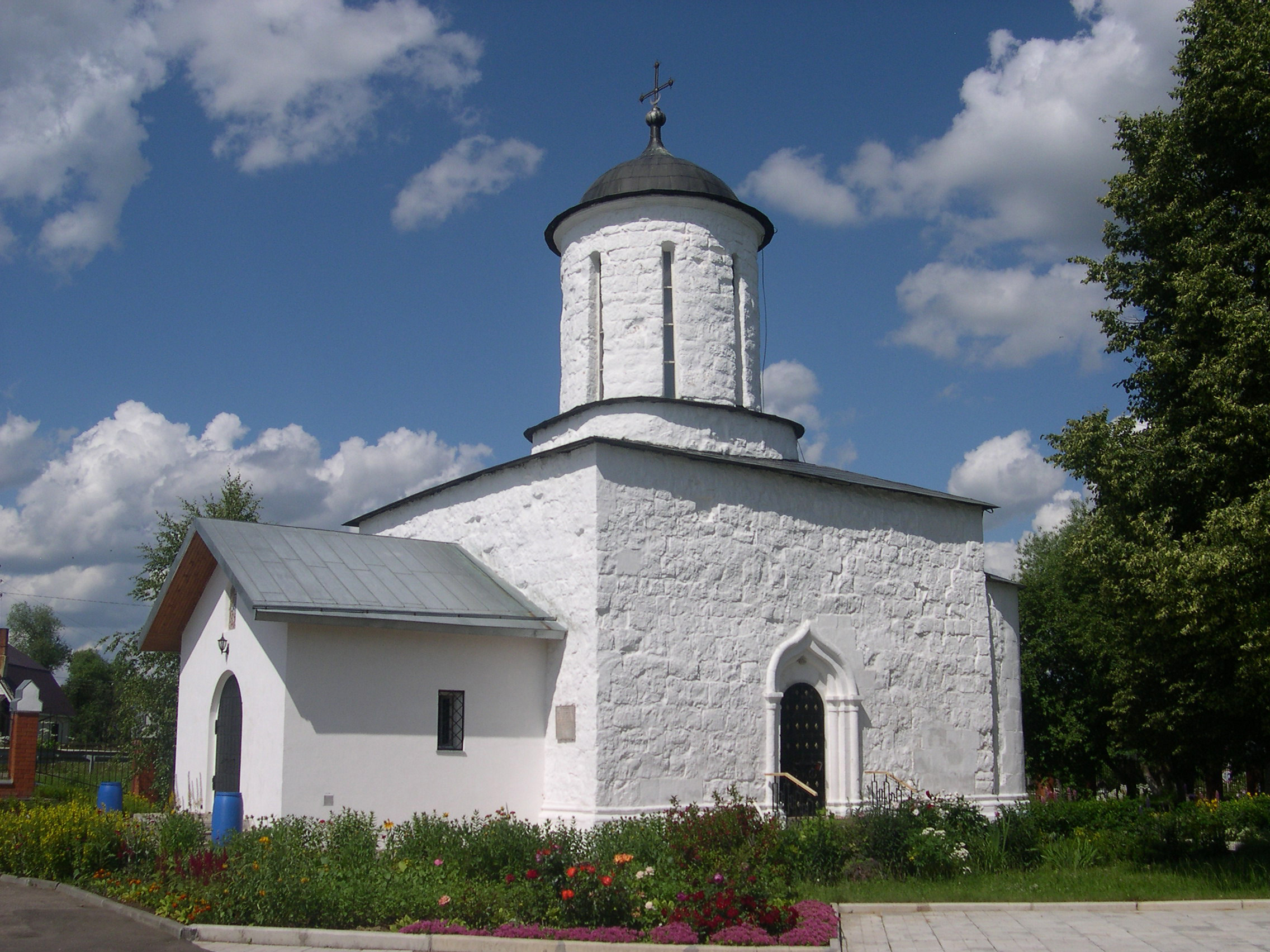
The medieval church in 2009. The porch is of a later date.

The Church of St Nicholas (Никольская церковь) is a small fortified church in the village of Kamenskoye, Naro-Fominsk District, Moscow Oblast, Russia. The Nara River is 200 meters away. Probably dating from the 14th century, this Orthodox church is considered the oldest building in the Moscow region (including the city of Moscow).

No records exist of the church prior to its dome's collapse during the Time of Troubles. Following a long period of neglect, the building was repaired and considerably expanded in the 18th century (when a refectory and a belfry were added). It remained little known until Mikhail Preobrazhensky, writing in the late 19th century, declared it the oldest building in the Kaluga Governorate. It was the subject of a medievalizing restoration programme in 1958–1964.

The limestone walls of the church are distorted and far from smooth. Unlike most Russian medieval churches, it has no pillars. The design is similar to the oldest churches of Kolomna and has parallels in the Slavic Balkans. The drum is placed on a pedestal that could support a team of archers to defend the structure from an attack. Most modern scholars date the church to the 14th century, with Sergey Zagraevsky dating it to the period between 1309 and 1312.
