= Stefanija Ladigienė =

- Born: Stefanija Paliulytė; 23 January 1901; Vabalninkas, Russian Empire
- Died: 18 September 1967 (aged 66); Vilnius, Lithuanian SSR
- Education: Vytautas Magnus University
- Occupations: Catholic women's activist, magazine editor, member of the Seimas
- Political party: Lithuanian Christian Democratic Party
- Spouse: Kazys Ladiga
- Children: 6
- Awards: Righteous Among the Nations

Stefanija Ladigienė née Paliulytė (23 January 1901 – 18 September 1967) was a Lithuanian Catholic women's activist and magazine editor. She was a member of the Third Seimas (Lithuania's parliament) in 1926–1927.

Born to a family of a Lithuanian book smuggler, Ladigienė attended schools in Saint Petersburg and Tambov and later studied but did not graduate from Vytautas Magnus University. She was the editor of Moteris, a monthly Lithuanian Catholic women's magazine published by the Lithuanian Catholic Women's Organization, in 1920–1922 and of monthly women's magazine Naujoji vaidilutė in 1925–1927. As a representative of the Lithuanian Christian Democratic Party, she was elected to the Third Seimas. As the youngest elected member, she was secretary of the first session of the Seimas but not a very active parliamentarian.

When her husband general Kazys Ladiga was dismissed from the Lithuanian Army, the family moved to the Gulbinėnai Manor near Pasvalys where they established a large farm. Despite family duties and remote location, Ladigienė remained active in public life. She organized local women into a choir, opened chapters of Catholic organizations Pavasarininkai and Angelaičiai, and delivered various educational lectures. In 1939, Ladigienė moved to Vilnius. During World War II, she hid Irena Veisaitė, a Jewish girl from the Kovno Ghetto. For attempting to reestablish Ateitis, Ladigienė was arrested by the NKVD in 1946 and sentenced to ten years in the Gulag. She returned to Lithuania in 1957 and died in Vilnius in 1967.

== Biography ==
=== Early life and education ===
Ladigienė was born on 23 January 1901 in Vabalninkas. The family had six children, five daughters and one son. Her father Tomas Paliulis was a Lithuanian book smuggler. Her parents promoted Lithuanian culture and music. Priest Adolfas Sabaliauskas recorded several examples of Lithuanian folk songs and games from her parents. Ladigienė assisted Sabaliauskas and Finnish professor Aukusti Niemi in editing Lithuanian texts of folk songs. Their house was visited by other Lithuanian activists, including poet Balys Sruoga with brothers, politician Ernestas Galvanauskas, priest Adolfas Sabaliauskas, teacher Jurgis Krikščiūnas, and others. They occasionally staged a theater play in a barn.

Ladigienė attended a primary school in Vabalninkas and a four-year school in Biržai. There she joined Ateitis, a Lithuanian Catholic youth organization. The local group gathered a small library of Lithuanian books and published newsletter Inkarėlis. In fall 1915, she moved to study at a gymnasium in Saint Petersburg. She later transferred to the Lithuanian girls' progymnasium of Žiburys Society which was evacuated from Marijampolė to Tambov due to World War I. At the same time, she attended various courses for music and foreign languages, including the Lithuanian course organized by Kazimieras Būga. She graduated from the gymnasium in Tambov with a gold medal in 1918.

=== Magazine editor ===
In summer 1918, Ladigienė returned to Lithuania. She worked in Vilnius at the Trade and Industry Bank and as a secretary to linguist Jonas Jablonskis. When the city was taken over by the Soviets, she moved to Kaunas and worked as a secretary at the Ministry of Agriculture. In fall 1920, she again moved to Vilnius to become the editor of Moteris, a monthly Lithuanian Catholic women's magazine published by the Lithuanian Catholic Women's Organization. However, Vilnius was captured by Poland during the Żeligowski's Mutiny in October 1920 and Ladigienė had to relocate to Kaunas which became the temporary capital of Lithuania.

In Kaunas, she continued to edit Moteris and also worked as a correspondent for Lietuva, the official daily of the Lithuanian government. In 1925–1927, she edited monthly women's magazine Naujoji vaidilutė. She published two separate books Moteris apaštalas (The Woman Apostle; 1934) and Moterystės tikslai ir gėrybės (Womanhood's Goals and Wealth; 1938). In her writings, Ladigienė promoted ideas that women should seek education and earn their own living, live a fulfilling and independent life while not neglecting their family duties.

In October 1920, she was elected to the board of the Lithuanian Women's Committee to Protect the Homeland (Lietuvos moterų komitetas Tėvynei ginti). The committee organized supplies for Lithuanian soldiers and provided care to soldiers returning from POW camps. However, activities of the committee diminished at the end of the Lithuanian Wars of Independence and it was disbanded in 1922.

In 1922, she followed her husband military officer Kazys Ladiga to Switzerland and Czechoslovakia where he studied at military academies. There she improved her French and became interested in the Sokol movement. When they returned to Lithuania and Ladiga was stationed in Marijampolė, Ladigienė worked as a French and physical education teacher at Marijampolė Gymnasium. When Ladiga was reassigned, she returned to Kaunas and in October 1925 enrolled at the Vytautas Magnus University where she studied philosophy, pedagogy, psychology, and sociology for three years but did not graduate due to family matters.

=== Member of the Seimas ===
In May 1926, as a representative of the Lithuanian Christian Democratic Party, she was elected to the Third Seimas. She was listed third on the party's list in the III (Raseiniai) District. At age 25, as the youngest member of the Seimas, she was secretary of the first session of the Seimas. She was a member of the parliamentary commission on work and social security and signed several Christian Democratic interpellations, but was not very active in the Seimas proceedings.

She was critical of the ruling Social Democrats and Popular Peasants. She published articles in the short-lived weekly Tautos valia which laid ideaological ground for the coup d'état of December 1926 against the government of President Kazys Grinius. Her husband participated in organizing this coup. The coup brought the Lithuanian Nationalist Union to power which began competing with the Christian Democrats. The Third Seimas was dissolved in April 1927.

=== Manor owner ===
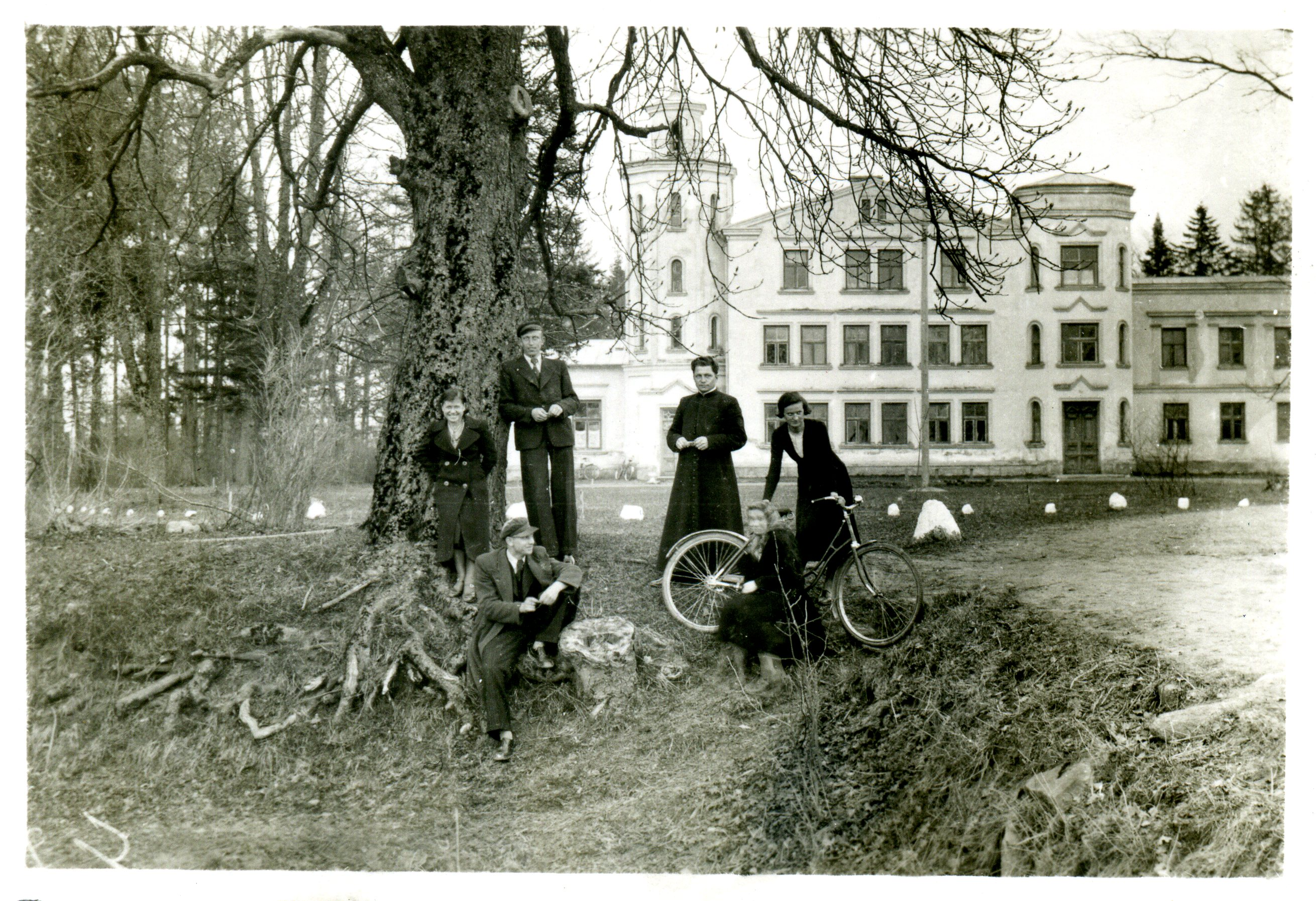
Gulbinėnai Manor in 1939

In August 1927, her husband Kazys Ladiga was dismissed from the military and the family moved to the Gulbinėnai Manor near Pasvalys. The manor was nationalized from the Karp family in 1924 according to the Lithuanian Land Reform of 1922. Since Ladiga volunteered for the Lithuanian Army in 1918, the manor was given to Ladiga. He then purchased more land and created a large farm that produced meat and dairy products.

The family worked to improve the manor and the village. They opened a post office, smithy, primary school, and chapel. Ladigienė organized local women into a choir and staged amateur theater plays. She also opened chapters of Catholic organizations Pavasarininkai and Angelaičiai. She organized 3-day pedagogical lectures for local women in 18 different towns and villages as well as a number of other lectures on family, child rearing, psychology, and other topics. She published a small pamphlet Gulbinėnų vaikas for village's children.

She attended various conferences and meetings of Catholic organizations, including the first conference of the Lithuanian Catholic Academy of Science in February 1933. There she delivered a presentation on the role of Catholic women in science. In March 1938, she delivered the closing address for the conference of the Lithuanian Catholic Women's Organization.

In her private correspondence, Ladigienė complained that farm work and family matters kept her away from public work. She had six children, three boys and three girls.

=== World War II ===
In fall 1939, after Lithuania regained Vilnius according to the Soviet–Lithuanian Mutual Assistance Treaty, Ladigienė moved to Vilnius where she worked as a math teacher. After the Soviet occupation of Lithuania in June 1940, Ladiga was arrested by the NKVD and the Gulbinėnai Manor was nationalized. Ladigienė remained in Vilnius. She worked various jobs, including as a bookkeeper at a café and hearth keeper at the Russian Drama Theatre of Lithuania.

During the German occupation, she lived in a large apartment on Trakų Street. She shared this apartment with teachers Adelė Dirsytė and Česlovas Mačys. The apartment was visited by various Lithuanian activists, including bishop Mečislovas Reinys, poet Bernardas Brazdžionis, composer Konradas Kaveckas, politician Pranas Dovydaitis, and spy Marcelė Kubiliūtė. Balys Sruoga visited Ladigienė right after his release from the Stutthof concentration camp. In this apartment, despite being a widow in a poor financial situation, Ladigienė hid Irena Veisaitė, a Jewish girl from the Kovno Ghetto, and treated her as her seventh child from early 1944 until the arrival of the Soviet troops in July 1944. For this, Ladigienė was recognized the Righteous Among the Nations in 1992.

=== Soviet Gulag ===
After Lithuania was re-occupied by the Soviets in 1944, Ladigienė was placed under NKVD surveillance. At her apartment (now reduced to a single room), she organized gatherings of Lithuanian intellectuals who wanted to reestablish Ateitis. One such meeting was attended by the NKVD informant Juozas Markulis and Ladigienė was arrested on 14 March 1946.

On 11 November 1946, the NKVD Military Tribunal sentenced her to ten years in prison and four years of exile. She was held in the 501st Labour Camp that constructed the Salekhard–Igarka Railway and later in the Angarlag which constructed the Baikal–Amur Mainline. She was released from the camps in 1955 but continued to live in exile in Golumet, Cheremkhovsky District, Irkutsk Oblast. She met her sons Algis and Benediktas who were deported in 1948–1949 and they returned to Lithuania in October 1957.

Ladigienė lived in Vilnius with her daughter artist Marija Ladigaitė-Vildžiūnienė. She was of poor health, but continued to maintain contacts with Lithuanian intellectuals, including Kazys Boruta, Vincas Mykolaitis-Putinas, Marcelė Kubiliūtė, Vytautas Landsbergis, Teofilija Dragūnaitė-Vaičiūnienė, Elena Žalinkevičaitė-Petrauskienė, Juozas Keliuotis, and the widows of general Jonas Juodišius and prime minister Antanas Merkys. She died on 18 September 1967 and was buried at the Saltoniškės Cemetery.

== Legacy ==
In 2003, the Genocide and Resistance Research Centre of Lithuania published a book with her diary, autobiography, letters, and memoirs by others. In July 2021, a memorial plaque was unveiled on the house on Trakų Street where Ladigienė lived from 1942 to 1946.
