= Church of the Nativity of Christ and St. Nicholas (Florence) =

Russian Orthodox church in the Italian city of Florence

Coordinates: 43°47′1.86″N 11°15′17.81″E

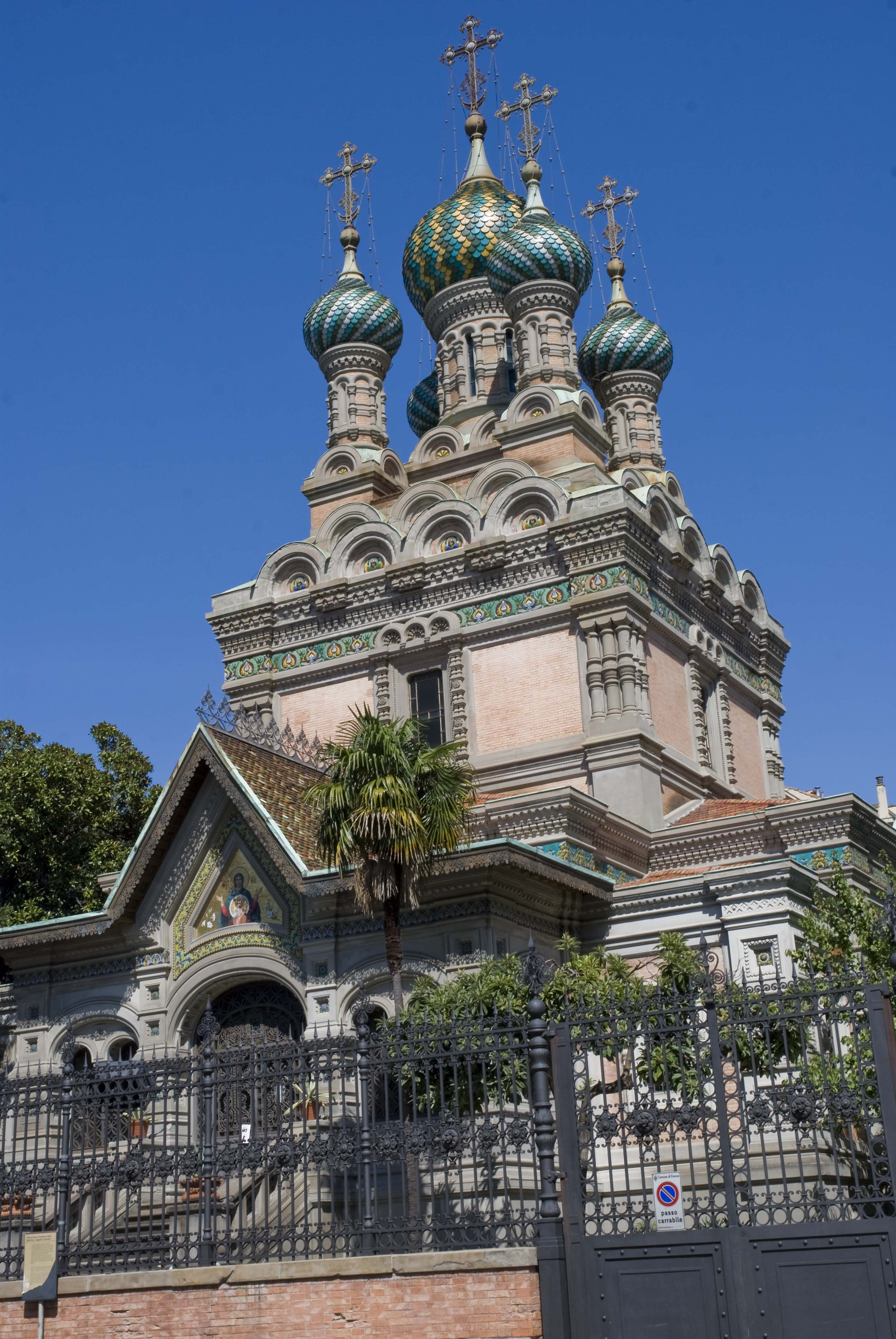

Church of the Nativity of Christ and St. Nicholas the Wonderworker (Italian: Chiesa della Natività di Nostro Signore Gesù Cristo e San Nicola Taumaturgo, Russian: Церковь Рождества Христова и Николая Чудотворца, The Russian Church, Italian: Chiesa russa) is a Russian Orthodox church in Florence, located on via Leone X, near the Basso Fortress. Its style is a late 19th and early 20th century imitation of the earlier Naryshkin Baroque.

== History ==
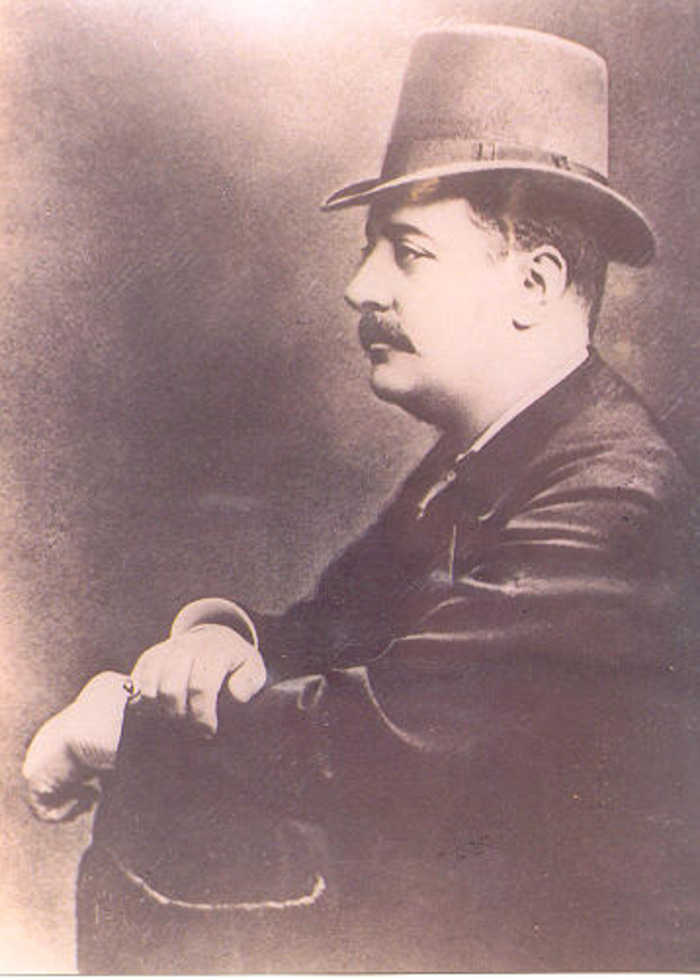
Prince Paul Pavlovitch Demidoff of San Donato.

Nicholas I of Russia's daughter Grand Duchess Maria Nikolaïevna first had the idea of building a church for Florence's Russian community in 1873, but it was only six years later that a large gift from prince Paul Pavlovitch Demidoff of San Donato allowed construction to commence. Pietro Berti was initially taken on to design it by archpriest Vladimir Levitsky, then curate of the Orthodox church at the Russian embassy. However, he later switched to the Russian academician Mikhail Preobrazhensky and the Florentine engineer Giuseppe Boccini.

However, Preobrajensky's first designs between 1883 and 1885 were too ambitious for the money available and so a temporary church was built on a site acquired by the embassy and that became the parish church on 16 October 1888. Levitsky finally raised enough funds to build a permanent structure and in 1897 the Russian ambassador and foreign minister approved plans produced in 1890 by Preobrajensky. The first stone was laid on 28 October 1899 at a ceremony attended by count Caracciolo di Sarno, prefect of Florence, general Antonio Baldissera, the Russian ambassador Aleksandr Nelidov and consul general Tchelebidaky. The lower part of the church (dedicated to St Nicholas the Wonderworker) was consecrated on 21 October 1902 and the upper church (dedicated to the Nativity of Christ) was consecrated on 8 November 1903. However, the building as a whole was only fully completed the following year.

After the 1917 Revolution the church in Florence lost state support and in 1921 it became independent from the church back in Russia despite attempts by Soviet diplomats to claim ownership of the building. From 1920 onwards it was under the jurisdiction of Eulogius and in February 1931 it joined the jurisdiction of the Archdiocese of Russian Orthodox churches in Western Europe. It is now under the jurisdiction of the Russian Orthodox Church outside Russia.

Constantine I of Greece died in exile in Palermo on 11 January 1923 and later that year he was buried in the church, followed in 1926 by his mother queen Olga Constantinovna of Russia and in 1932 by his widow Sophia of Prussia. All three sets of remains were moved to the Tatoi Palace in Greece in November 1936, a year after the restoration of the Greek monarchy.

== Bibliography ==
- (in Italian) D. Notaristefano, La Chiesa Russa Ortodossa di Firenze, tesi di Laurea 1986
- (in Italian) M. Talalaj, La Chiesa Ortodossa Russa di Firenze, 1995
- (in Italian) S. Meloni, I Demidoff e la chiesa russa di Firenze, in Tonini L. (dir.), I Demidoff a Firenze e in Toscana, Firenze 1996
- (in Italian) V. Vaccaro (ed.), La chiesa ortodossa russa di Firenze, Florence, 1998
