= Marcelė Kubiliūtė =

Lithuanian spy and activist (1898–1963)

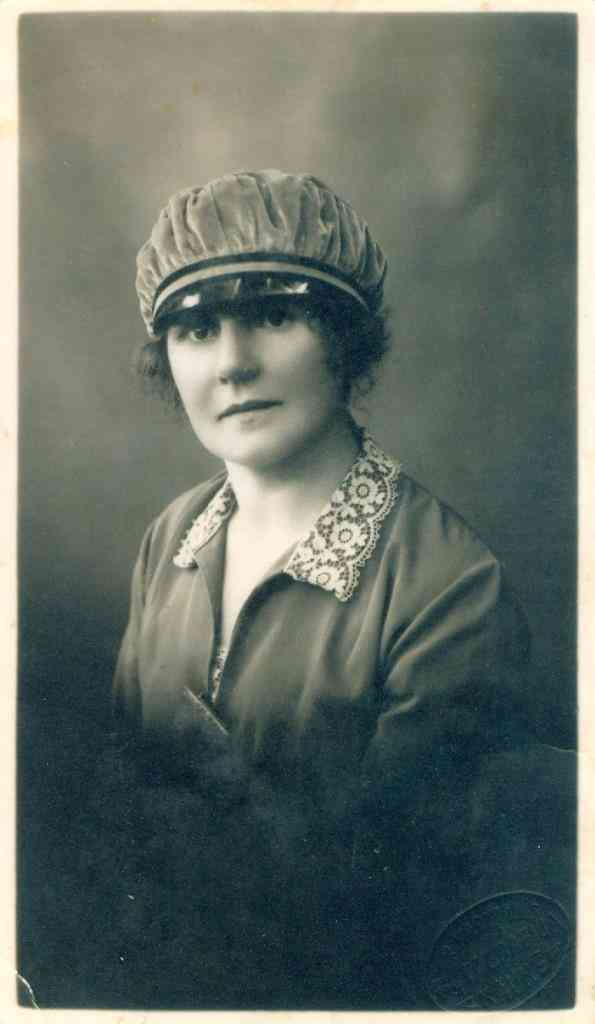
- Kubiliūtė in 1927
- Born: 28 July 1898; Tindžiuliai, Russian Empire
- Died: 13 July 1963 (aged 64); Vilnius, Lithuanian SSR
- Burial place: Rasos Cemetery
- Education: Vytautas Magnus University
- Occupations: Spy, activist
- Employer: Ministry of Foreign Affairs
- Board member of: Union for the Liberation of Vilnius
- Relatives: Juozas Kubilius (brother)
- Awards: Order of the Cross of Vytis; Order of the Lithuanian Grand Duke Gediminas; Order of Vytautas the Great

Marcelė Kubiliūtė (28 July 1898 – 13 June 1963) was a Lithuanian spy and activist. She is the only Lithuanian woman to be awarded all the major Lithuanian orders. Virtually unknown until her memoirs were published in 1999, she is now recognized as a "legendary" figure in the Lithuanian intelligence services.

In 1912, Kubiliūtė moved to Vilnius where she worked at the editorial offices of the Lithuanian newspaper Viltis published by Antanas Smetona. During World War I, she evacuated to Voronezh and later Saint Petersburg where she graduated from a gymnasium. In 1918, she returned to Vilnius where she edited Lithuanian periodicals, organized aid to injured and imprisoned Lithuanian soldiers, and became a spy for the Lithuanian government. She gathered information on Polish military forces and played a key role in obtaining documents of the Polish Military Organization that helped thwart the planned coup in Lithuania in September 1919. She had to flee to Kaunas as Polish counterintelligence was about to arrest her.

In interwar Lithuania, she continued to work for the Lithuanian intelligence on matters concerning Lithuanians in the disputed Vilnius Region. In 1925, she moved to work at the Ministry of Foreign Affairs where she dealt with cyphers and the library of secret documents. She was an active member of the Lithuanian Riflemen's Union and the Union for the Liberation of Vilnius. During World War II, she maintained contacts with the Lithuanian Activist Front and joined the underground Union of Lithuanian Freedom Fighters. She helped many evading persecutions by the Nazis.

She was arrested by the NKVD in August 1945 and sentenced to five years of exile. Upon her return to Lithuania in 1949, she worked as a bookkeeper in Tauragė. The KGB continued to monitor her until her health deteriorated in 1958 due to bone tuberculosis and breast cancer. After extensive treatments, she died in 1963.

== Biography ==
=== Early life and education ===
Kubiliūtė was born on 28 July 1898 in Tindžiuliai near Panemunėlis in present-day northern Lithuania. Her family were well off peasants who participated in the distribution of the banned Lithuanian press. She was first educated by the local Catholic priest Jonas Katelė, who was also active in Lithuanian cultural life. She later attended a primary school in Panemunėlis.

In 1912, her elder brother Juozas Kubilius (elected to the first Russian State Duma) took her to Vilnius where she attended an evening school and worked at the editorial offices of the Lithuanian newspaper Viltis published by Antanas Smetona. She was invited by priest Fabijonas Kemėšis to emigrate to the United States, but her mother fell ill and she returned to her native Tindžiuliai to care for her.

In 1915, as the German Imperial Army approached Vilnius, Kubiliūtė was evacuated together with other Lithuanian students to Voronezh in Russia. She became ill, and her brother Juozas took her to Saint Petersburg in 1916. He died in March 1917. His funeral was officiated by Juozas Tumas-Vaižgantas. Kubiliūtė developed feelings for poet Julius Janonis who supported the Bolsheviks. However, he was ill with tuberculosis and died by suicide in May 1917. She then became engaged to a doctor, but he was killed in the Russian Civil War. Nevertheless, Kubiliūtė managed to graduate from a gymnasium and bookkeeping courses by fall 1918.

=== Activist in Vilnius ===
Kubiliūtė returned to Lithuania at the end of 1918. She moved to Vilnius where she lived in a student dormitory that was organized by Emilija Vileišienė. Kubiliūtė found a job at a bank and later at the editorial offices of Lithuanian periodicals Nepriklausomoji Lietuva and Vilniaus garsas. After work, she organized classes for children of Lithuanian workers. The classes were attended by 25 children.

In late 1918, lieutenant Juozas Matusaitis recruited Kubiliūtė to work for the Lithuanian intelligence. Vilnius changed hands frequently: Soviets occupied it at the start of the Lithuanian–Soviet War in January 1919, but Poland captured it in April 1919 during the Polish–Soviet War. Kubiliūtė remained in the city and gathered information on Polish forces, military transports, military press, etc. and relayed it to the Lithuanian government in Kaunas. According to her memoirs, her sources included Polish major Antoni Jankowski with whom she had a long intimate relationship (no officer by such name is known in the Polish military).

In August 1919, the Polish Military Organization (PMO) planned a coup in Lithuania in hopes of installing a new pro-Polish government. The Lithuanian government learned about the coup and arrested some 200 Polish activists, but did not have specific information about the PMO or its members. Aldona Čarneckaitė (editor of Głos Litwy published by Mykolas Biržiška, secretary of Jonas Basanavičius, and sister of Voldemaras Vytautas Čarneckis) convinced Petras Vrubliauskas (Piotr Wróblewski), PMO deputy commander in Vilnius, to transfer PMO documents to the Lithuanians. On 21 September 1919, Kubiliūtė obtained the documents and transferred key files to Ignas Jonynas and Augustinas Voldemaras, who at the time were visiting Vilnius on a diplomatic mission. This allowed the Lithuanian intelligence service to liquidate the PMO in Lithuania.

Kubiliūtė organized aid to injured or imprisoned Lithuanians, as well as the elderly and the orphans. She buried 19 Lithuanian soldiers in Rasos Cemetery. Kubiliūtė helped several Lithuanians escape prison in October 1920 by bringing alcohol to Polish guards. She was also active in defending Lithuanian-language schools in Vilnius Region and organizing protests and the boycott of the January 1922 election to the Sejm of Central Lithuania.

=== Interwar Lithuania ===
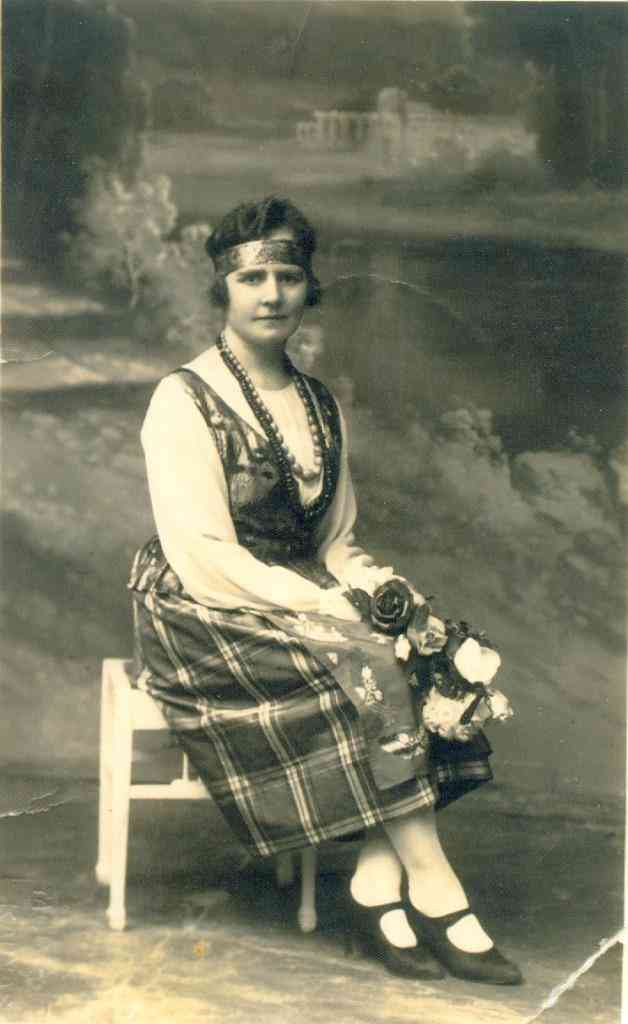
Kubiliūtė dressed in a traditional Lithuanian dress in 1930

As Polish counterintelligence offered a bounty of 5,000 Polish złoty for information about her, Kubiliūtė had to move from Vilnius (now part of the Second Polish Republic) to Kaunas. In 1923, she began studying history at Vytautas Magnus University (she graduated only in 1936).

She continued to work for the Lithuanian intelligence focusing on issues concerning Lithuanians in the Vilnius Region. The Lithuanian government supported various Lithuanian organizations in the area, but had no official way of communicating with them. Kubiliūtė acted as a secret carrier of large sums of cash and various documents that were secretly exchanged at the Poland–Lithuania border. In 1925, she moved to work at the Ministry of Foreign Affairs. She worked with cyphers and organized the ministry's secret archive. She was promoted to secretary in 1931 and to first secretary in 1939. Her direct supervisors were Bronius Kazys Balutis and Juozas Urbšys.

Kubiliūtė was also active in various Lithuanian organizations. She joined the Lithuanian Riflemen's Union in 1920. She organized its secret chapter in Vilnius in 1929, but this claim is disputed. She also joined the Union for the Liberation of Vilnius and was elected to its central committee. She was a member of the Society for the Care of Lithuanian Prisoners (Lietuvos kalinių globos draugija) and personally delivered parcels to Kaunas Prison. She was also active in the Lithuanian Girl Scouts.

=== World War II ===
When Lithuania regained Vilnius as a result of the Soviet–Lithuanian Mutual Assistance Treaty, Kubiliūtė returned to Vilnius. After the Soviet occupation of Lithuania in June 1940, she lost her job at the Ministry of Foreign Affairs but managed to get a job at the Peoples' Commissariat for Social Welfare. In spring 1941, she became a secretary for the history section of the Lithuanian Academy of Sciences.

Already in 1941, she attracted attention from the NKVD which suspected that Kubiliūtė gathered information from the Peoples' Commissariat and relayed it to the Lithuanian Activist Front. The NKVD intended to arrest her, but reportedly she was warned by her boss Jurgis Glušauskas and managed to evade the security agents. Kubiliūtė joined the anti-Soviet June Uprising at the start of the German invasion of the Soviet Union. She was a member of the rebel headquarters in Vilnius. Once Germans disbanded rebel organizations, she obtained a job at a library located in Vileišis Palace (one of the subsidiary libraries of the Lithuanian Academy of Sciences), but continued underground activities. She became an active member of the underground Union of Lithuanian Freedom Fighters in August 1942. Together with others, she distributed union's publications and established a women's section in January 1943.

Kubiliūtė helped various individuals persecuted by the Nazis. She helped Vytautas Sirijos Gira, Kazimieras Lukša (husband of Meilė Lukšienė), and Jurgis Glušauskas avoid persecution. She organized aid to Lithuanian intellectuals, including Vladas Jurgutis, who has been deported to Stutthof concentration camp. She also helped Irena Veisaitė who had escaped the Vilna Ghetto.

=== Soviet persecution ===
Unlike many other Lithuanian activists, Kubiliūtė did not retreat west ahead of the approaching Red Army. After the second Soviet occupation of Lithuania in 1944, Kubiliūtė continued working at the library. On 17 August 1944, she was arrested by the NKVD. Over the period of nine months, she was interrogated 23 times. The interrogations were mainly conducted at night and involved torture. On 7 July 1946, the Special Council of the NKVD sentenced her to 5 years in exile according to the Article 58 (RSFSR Penal Code).

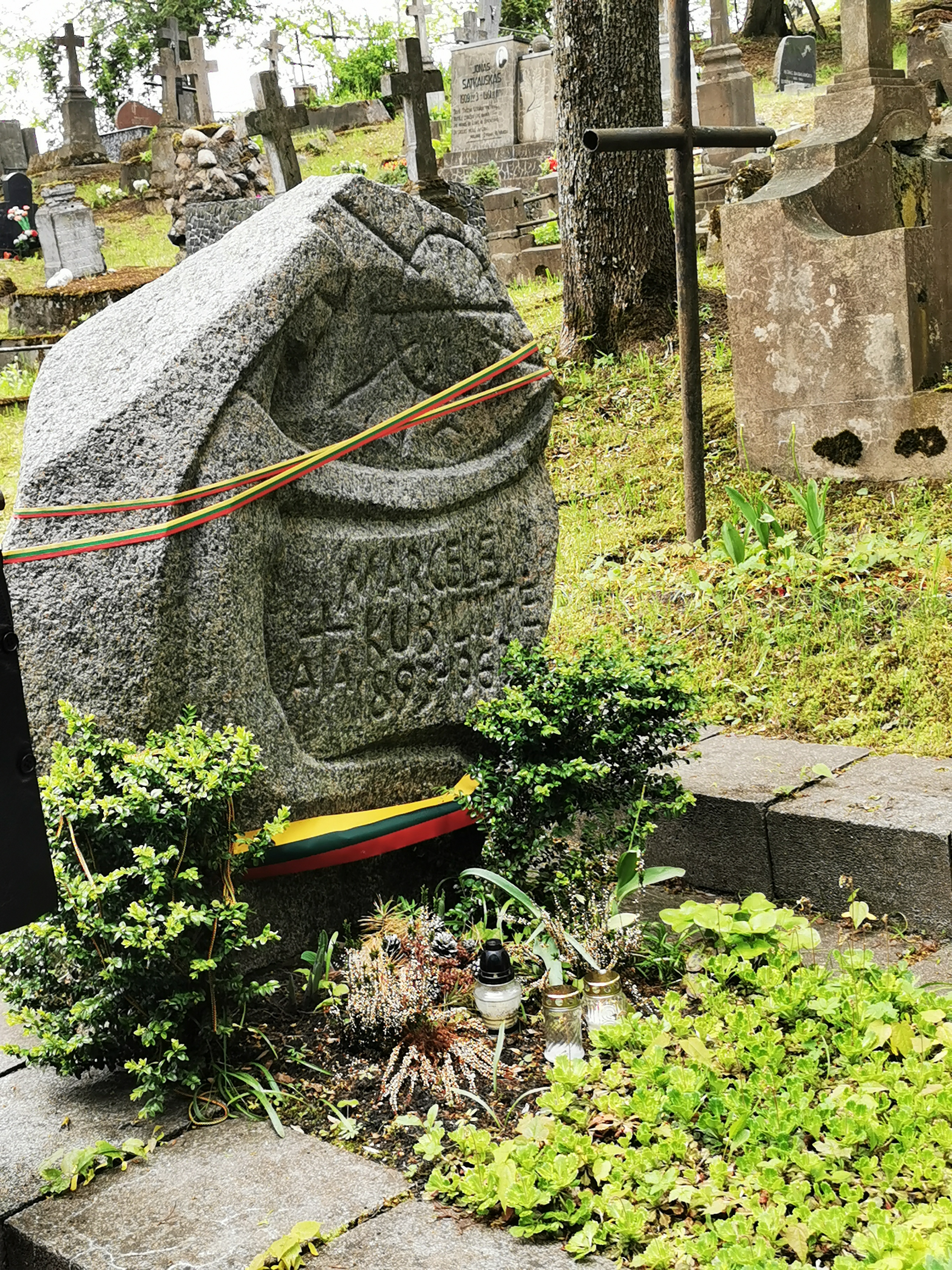
Grave of Kubiliūtė in Rasos Cemetery

She was first deported to Ingair in the Tobolsky District. She was later transferred to Tobolsk for medical treatments and then to the Atbasar District in Kazakhstan where she worked sewing furs. She was released in August 1949. Kubiliūtė returned to Lithuania where she was initially sheltered by dentist Julija Biliūnienė. She quickly moved to Tauragė where she worked as a bookkeeper. She was monitored by the KGB under suspicion that she continued to maintain contacts with interwar public figures and activists (particularly with the historian Ignas Jonynas, former Prime Minister Leonas Bistras, last Minister of Foreign Affairs Juozas Urbšys, women's activist Stefanija Ladigienė, and others). In KGB documents, she was classified as an agent of the Germans and later of the British.

She returned to Vilnius in 1956. She lived with the widow of Liudas Gira in Žvėrynas and worked at a children's hospital. The KGB considered recruiting her as an agent, but her health was failing. She was ill with bone tuberculosis and breast cancer. She was treated at different hospitals and sanatoriums from the summer of 1958, including at a tuberculosis hospital in the former Vyžulionys Manor. Her former colleagues who retreated to the United States sent her packages with medicine, clothing, etc.

She died on 13 June 1963 and was buried in Rasos Cemetery, next to the Lithuanian soldiers she buried in 1920. Her funeral was attended by many Lithuanian activists. Vincas Uždavinys, her former colleague from the Union for the Liberation of Vilnius, delivered a speech.

== Legacy and memory ==
Due to the nature of her work, she kept her life private and was virtually unknown to the public. When Vanda Daugirdaitė-Sruogienė collected memoirs about her in the United States, many of her acquaintances could testify that she helped many but very few could share specific details about her life, work, or family. Jonas Budrys, head of the Lithuanian counterintelligence, in his memoirs, mentioned Kubiliūtė only once, saying that Lithuania's fate was in her hands.

Her life attracted more attention after Lithuania regained independence in 1990. In 1998, on her 100th birth anniversary, a street in Lazdynėliai (suburb of Vilnius) was named in her honor. Her memoirs were first published in 1999. In 2023, Seimas (Lithuanian parliament) marked her 125th birth anniversary as an official state commemoration.

In 2016, the Lithuanian National Radio and Television produced a TV series Laisvės kaina. Savanoriai (Price of Freedom. Volunteers) about the key moments in the history of interwar Lithuania. Kubiliūtė (played by Toma Vaškevičiūtė) was one of the main characters in the series. In 2019, director Neringa Danienė staged play Marcelės legenda (Legend of Marcelė) in Rokiškis. It was shown just a few times before being cancelled due to the COVID-19 pandemic. It was resumed in 2023. In 2023, a documentary film about Kubiliūtė was directed by Justinas Lingys.

== Awards ==
Kubiliūtė received the following awards:

- 1928: Order of the Cross of Vytis (2nd type, 3rd degree)
- 1928: Order of the Lithuanian Grand Duke Gediminas (4th degree)
- 1928: Independence Medal
- 1930: Order of Vytautas the Great (5th degree)
- 1932: Riflemen's Star
- 1938: Order of the Lithuanian Grand Duke Gediminas (3rd degree)
- 2020: Life Saving Cross (for the rescue of Irena Veisaitė)

She is the only Lithuanian woman to be awarded all major Lithuanian orders.

== Bibliography ==
- Levandavičiūtė, Ona (2020). Ėjusi kasdien į mūšį. Legendinės žvalgės Marcelės Kubiliūtės biografinė apybraiža (in Lithuanian). Margi raštai. ISBN 9789986095064.
- Kairiūkštytė, Nastazija, ed. (1999). Dek, širdie, ant amžinojo aukuro...: Marcelės Kubiliūtės 100-sioms gimimo metinėms (1898 07 28 – 1963 06 13) paminėti (in Lithuanian). Vilnius: Lithuanian Institute of History. ISBN 9986-34-033-0.
