= Julius B. Maller =

American educator and sociologist

Julius Bernard Maller (April 15, 1901 – May 8, 1959) was a Lithuanian-born Jewish-American educator and sociologist from New York.

== Life ==
Maller was born on April 15, 1901, in Vabalninkas, Russian Empire, the son of Abraham Shalom Maller and Minna Glass. He immigrated to America in 1921.

An orphan at nine, Maller quickly started working whatever job he could find, attend school irregularly, and saved money to buy books and study at home. When he was fourteen, he began working as a tutor until he saved enough money to come to America and join his three married sisters in Cincinnati, Ohio, where he got a job as an assistant for the public library's foreign language department. In November 1921, he moved to St. Louis, Missouri, and worked as a teacher in the Montefiore School while attending the Central High School as a special student. He was able to graduate from the school in nine months, after which he went to Washington University. He graduated from there in 1925. During that time, he also wrote for several local Jewish publications, served as an editor of the St. Louis Post-Dispatch for two years, and became librarian of the Menorah Society.

Maller then went to New York City, New York, receiving a Doctorate of Hebrew Letters from the Jewish Theological Seminary of America in 1928 and a Ph.D. from Columbia University in 1929. He worked as director of educational research for the Union of American Hebrew Congregations from 1929 to 1932. An expert in general and Jewish education, his published contributions include achievement tests in Jewish history and a syllabus of educational psychology that embodied an application of certain general principles to the teaching of Jewish studies. He was especially interested in character education of the child. In 1933, he published the results of a survey on juvenile delinquency among Jews. He conducted a survey for the New York State Board of Regents into the character and cost of public education in the state. He made an exhaustive analysis of the relation of schools in given communities to the communities' social and economic backgrounds, and the results were published in School and Community in 1939. As a director of Institute of Crime Prevention, he published Studies in Service and Self-Control in 1929 and Character and Personality Traits in 1934.

Maller worked as a lecturer and an educational psychology and research associate for Teachers College, Columbia University from 1929 to 1936. Following the survey he conducted for the New York State Board of Regents from 1937 to 1939, he worked as research psychologist for the United States Housing Authority and the Office of Strategic Services from 1940 to 1943. He was also a visiting professor of psychology at Howard University in Washington, D.C., from 1941 to 1943. He then worked as director of research and publications of the American Jewish Committee from 1943 to 1946, senior psychologist of the Department of Defense from 1947 to 1949, and an associate director of a health survey for the New York Academy of Medicine from 1950 to 1951. He was also chairman of the American Sociometric Association committee on research from 1948 to 1950, a member of the American Sociological Society committee on housing research from 1943 to 1945, the National Jewish Welfare Board committee on war records from 1946 to 1948, the Boy Scouts of America advisory committee on program research from 1929 to 1940, and the New York State Board of Regents advisory committee on character education from 1939 to 1941, a delegate to the Tenth International Congress of Psychology in Copenhagen in 1932 and the Eleventh International Congress of Psychology in Paris in 1937, and a fellow of the American Psychological Association, the American Association for the Advancement of Science, and the New York Academy of Medicine.

In 1949, Maller was named head of a new psycho-educational clinic that specialized in adjustment problems of gifted children and refugee families at Yeshiva University's School of Education and Community Administration. In 1954, he was director of research for a fact-finding committee for the New York City Board of Education to examine the application of the state formula for allocating aid to education to New York City. The committee concluded the city wasn't getting as much state aid as it should have been. By 1955, he was senior management consultant for New York City Administrator Dr. Luther Gulick. He resigned from the position that year when New York State Comptroller Arthur Levitt Sr. appointed him Director of Research and Statistics in the Department of Audit and Control. He still held that position when he died. He was also professor of psychology at Yeshiva University from 1949 until his death.

Maller developed the "Guess Who" technique in 1929, a sociometric test for children. He also devised the personality test known as the "Maller Personality Sketches" in 1936 as well as the "Maller Character Sketches," which consisted of cards with descriptions of personality and character traits that were to sorted into groups. His research proved that intelligence test scores at the fifth grade level were closely related to socioeconomic levels and that there was a close relationship between delinquency, population density, and economic level. His chapter on personality tests in the 1944 work Personality and the Behavior Disorders became adopted as a standard treatment. He wrote a number of publications on his research and was a frequent contributor to Jewish educational periodicals.

In 1934, Maller married Ruth Aronowitz, daughter of Rabbi Benjamin Aronowitz. Their children were Julia Shifre, Jean, and Michael.

Maller died from a heart attack at the Montefiore Hospital in the Bronx on May 8, 1959.
