= Vabalninkas =

- City
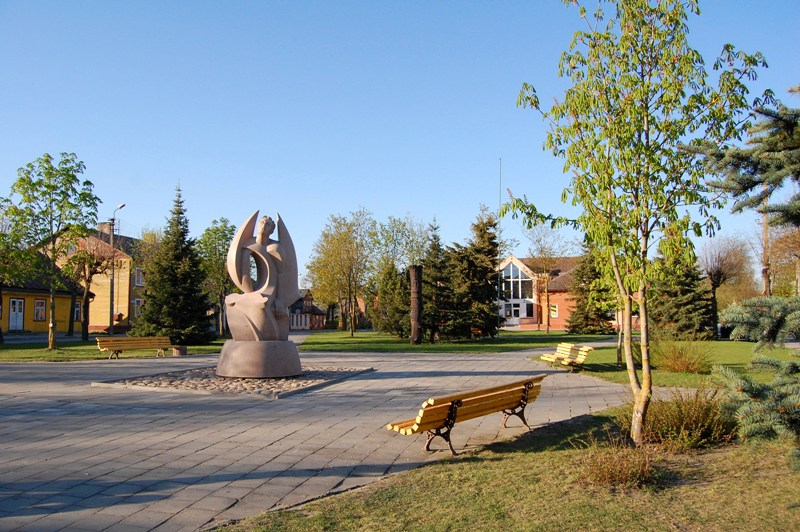
- Center of Vabalninkas

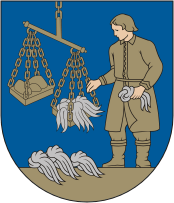
- Coat of arms

- Location of Vabalninkas
- Coordinates: 55°58′0″N 24°45′0″E
- Country: Lithuania
- Ethnographic region: Aukštaitija
- County: Panevėžys County
- Municipality: Biržai district municipality
- Eldership: Vabalninkas eldership
- Capital of: Vabalninkas eldership
- First mentioned: 1555
- Granted city rights: 1775

Population (2024)
  - Total: 857
- Time zone: UTC+2 (EET)
  - Summer (DST): UTC+3 (EEST)

Vabalninkas is a city in the Biržai district municipality, Lithuania. It is located 26 km (16 mi) south of Biržai. The etymology of the town's name is from the Vabala river, which means "beetle" in English.

== History ==
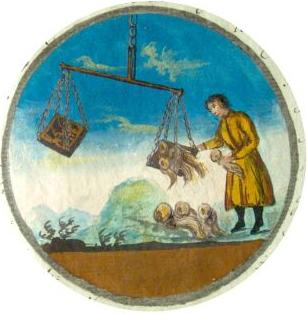
Old Vabalninkai coats of arms, 1792

Vabalninkas town was mentioned in 1554, Vabalninkas estate in 1555. In 1593, Vabalninkas was assigned to Anne of Austria, wife of Sigismund III Vasa.

In 1617 first wooden church was built. Jeronimas Valavičius Grand Treasurer of the Grand Duchy of Lithuania established a parish of Catholics, and a parish school. Since 1618 Vabalninkas is called a town, in 1619 Vabalninkas got a privilege to organise markets.

In 1625 Vabalninkas was devastated by the Swedish army and plague. In 1644 Vabalninkas inhabitants got a privilege to make and sell craft beer.

After the Soviet occupation Lithuanian partisans of Vytis military district were active, namely the Pilėnų tėvūnija (Pilėnai detachment).

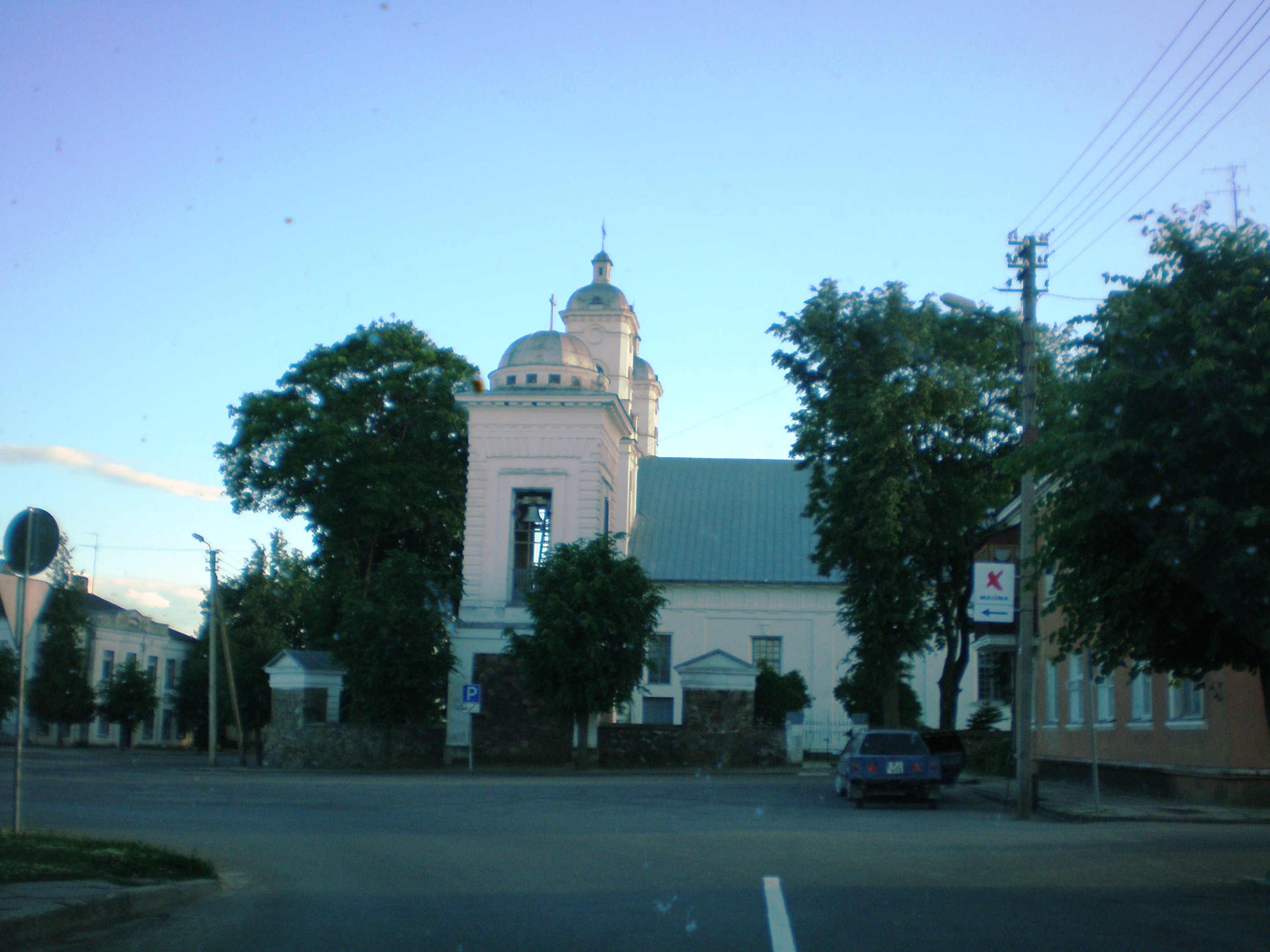
Church of Vabalninkas

== Notable residents ==
- Mikhail Preobrazhensky (1854–1930), Russian architect
- Stefanija Ladigienė (1901–1967), ateitininkai activist, teacher, publicist, exile.
- Julius B. Maller (1901–1959), educator and sociologist.
- Vladas Būtėnas (1923–1993), journalist, publicist.
- Edmundas Lapinskas (1936), agronomist, professor.
- Justas Tolvaišis (1954–2008), illustrator, graphic artist.
- Elazar Shach, rabbi.
