= Church of Demetrius of Thessaloniki, Dubrovo =

Church in Naro-Fominsk District, Moscow, Rusiia

Church of Demetrius of Thessaloniki
- Church of Dimitriya Solunskogo
- Церковь Димитрия Солунского
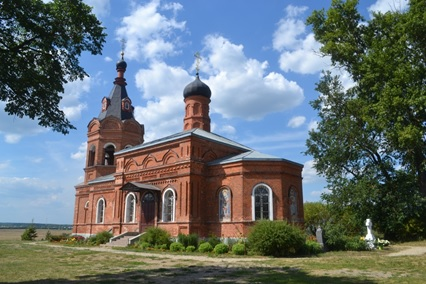
- The Church of Demetrius of Thessaloniki in 2016

- Location within Russia
- 55°13′17.35″N 36°12′09.13″E
- Location: Dubrovo, Naro-Fominsk District
- Country: Russia
- Religious institute: Eastern Orthodoxy

History
- Founded: 1896
- Dedication: Demetrius of Thessaloniki
- Consecrated: 1896

Architecture
- Heritage designation: Regional cultural heritage site in Russia
- Architectural type: Russian Revival architecture

Administration
- Diocese: Diocese of Moscow

The Church of Demetrius of Thessaloniki, (Russian: Церковь Димитрия Солунского), is Orthodox church in the village of Dubrovo, in the Naro-Fominsky District. Its part of the Diocese of Moscow.

== History ==
According to legend, the first church on this place was built by Dimitri Donskoy. It was named after Demetrius of Thessaloniki and its predecessor was destroyed during the Time of Troubles. In 1671 the construction of a new church was started on top of the ruins of the previous one, having a refectory roofed with black tar.

A new church was built in 1780 by the owner of the village, Alexander Shuvalov, but the count died in 1771, and in a petition dated of 1893, permission to build a new church was requested, as it was stated that the church was wooden, dilapidated and cold. In 1896 (according to other sources, in 1894) the current temple was completed and consecrated.

The church was closed in the 1930s, used for storage of chemical fertilisers, and in the 1970s the marquee and the dome of the bell tower were torn down. The building was returned to the church in 1994.

== See also ==
- Diocese of Moscow
- Russian Revival architecture
