= Mikhail Preobrazhensky =

Russian architect, teacher, architectural historian, academic and restorer

- Михаил Тимофеевич Преображенский
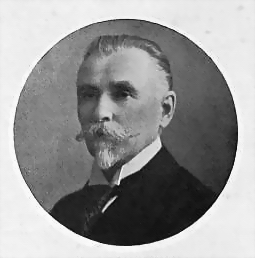
- Mikhail Preobrazhensky (1914)
- Born: October 4, 1854; Vobal'niki, Ponevezh, Kovno Governorate, Russian Empire
- Died: September 25, 1930 (aged 75); Leningrad, Soviet Union
- Education: Member Academy of Arts (1887); Full Member Academy of Arts (1893); Professor by rank (1894)
- Alma mater: Moscow School of Painting; Imperial Academy of Arts (1879)
- Known for: Architecture
- Style: Russian Revival architecture
- Awards: Big Gold Medal of the Imperial Academy of Arts (1878)

Mikhail Timofeevich Preobrazhensky (Russian: Михаил Тимофеевич Преображенский; 1854–1930) was a Russian architect, teacher, architectural historian, academic and restorer. He was an active member of both the Imperial Academy of Arts and the Imperial Orthodox Palestine Society. His works include the Russian Church in Florence, Italy, a collaboration with Giuseppe Boccini. He was born in the town of Vobal'niki (now in Lithuania but then in the Russian Empire) and died in Leningrad.

== Biography ==
He studied at the architectural department of the Moscow School of Painting, Sculpture and Architecture from 1870 to 1874. He graduated in 1875 and was awarded a small silver medal for the draft public library.

Studied at the Faculty of Architecture at the Imperial Academy of Arts (1875–1879). Pupil of Professor A.I. Rezanov and Academician David Grimm (founder of the “Russian style” in architecture). Awarded a large silver medal Academy of Arts (1876) for the project of the mausoleum, a small gold medal (1877) for the program "Station in the Metropolitan Park", a large gold medal (1879) for the project "Barracks for 1000 soldiers." He graduated from the Imperial Academy of Arts (1879) with the title of first-class artist and the gold medal "For a very good knowledge of architecture."

Foreign pensioner of the Imperial Academy of Arts (from 1882 to 1888) in Italy (Venice, Florence and Rome), in Paris, in Munich and Vienna. He was elected academician of architecture of the Imperial Academy of Arts (1887).

In 1888 he was appointed associate professor of the academy and returned to Russia to study the monuments of ancient Russian art and architecture. The result of the research is the scientific work “Monuments of ancient Russian architecture within the Kaluga province”. The publication was awarded a large silver medal of the Imperial Russian Archaeological Society.

Full Member Academy of Arts (1893). Receives the position of professor by rank Academy of Arts (1894) and becomes a member of the Council of the Academy. He taught at the Imperial Academy of Arts before its closure in 1918.

He headed the architectural bureau under the People's Commissariat of Education of the RSFSR (1919–1922). In the last years of his life, he led the scientific work at the State Academy of the History of Material Culture in Leningrad.

He died on September 25, 1930. He was buried at the Resurrection Cemetery of the Novodevichy Monastery in the Leningrad Monastery in Leningrad.

== Works ==

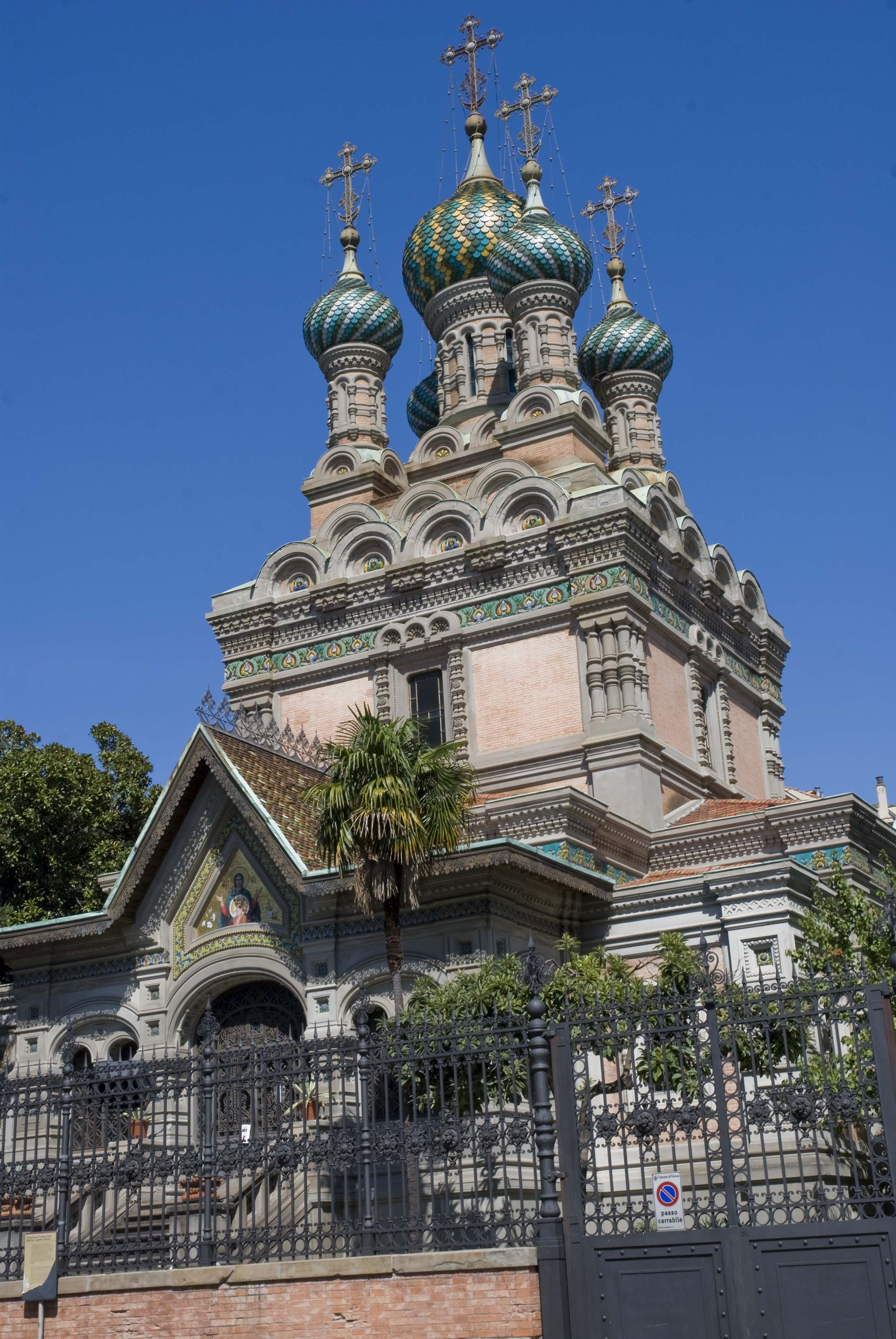

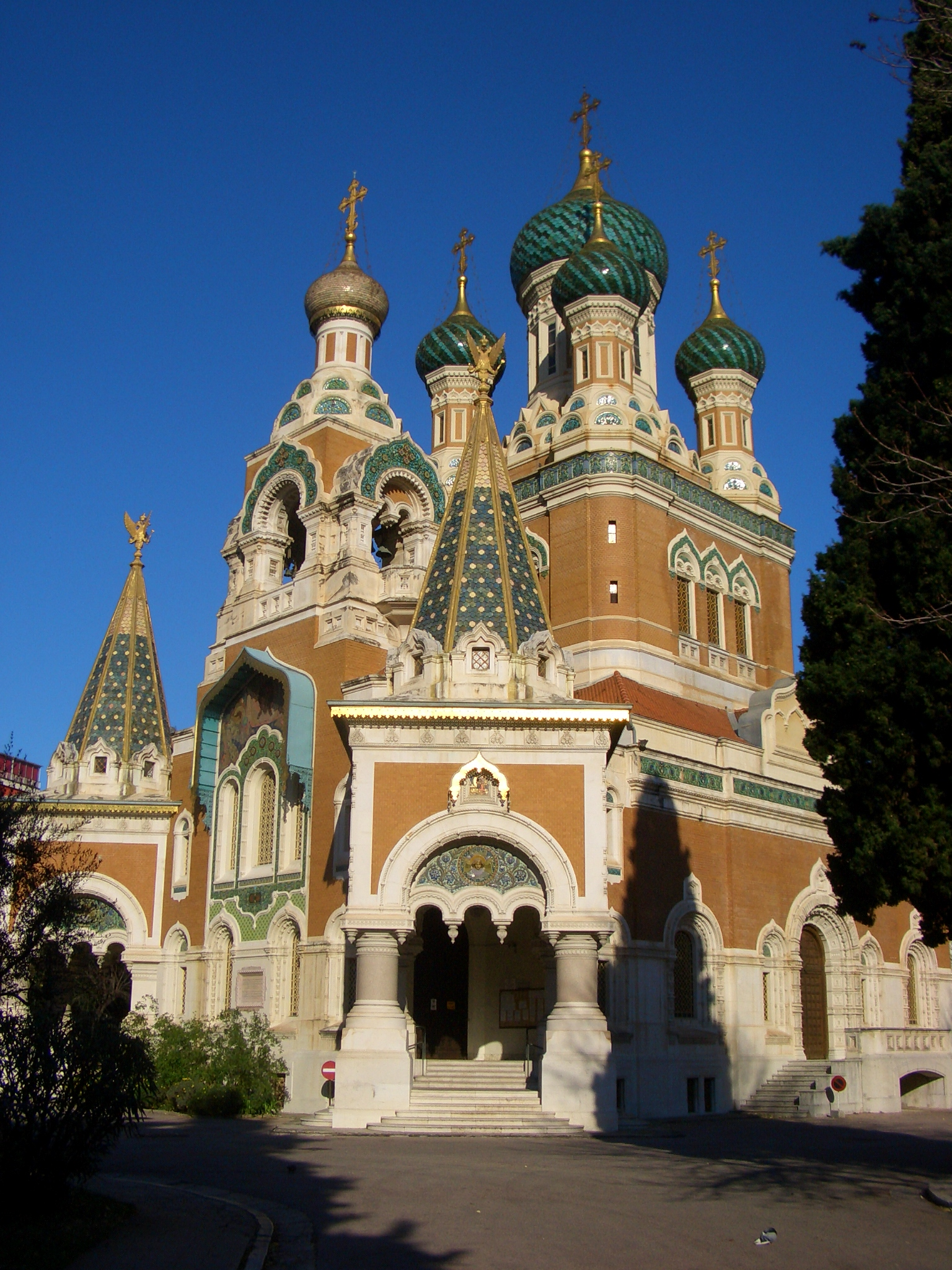

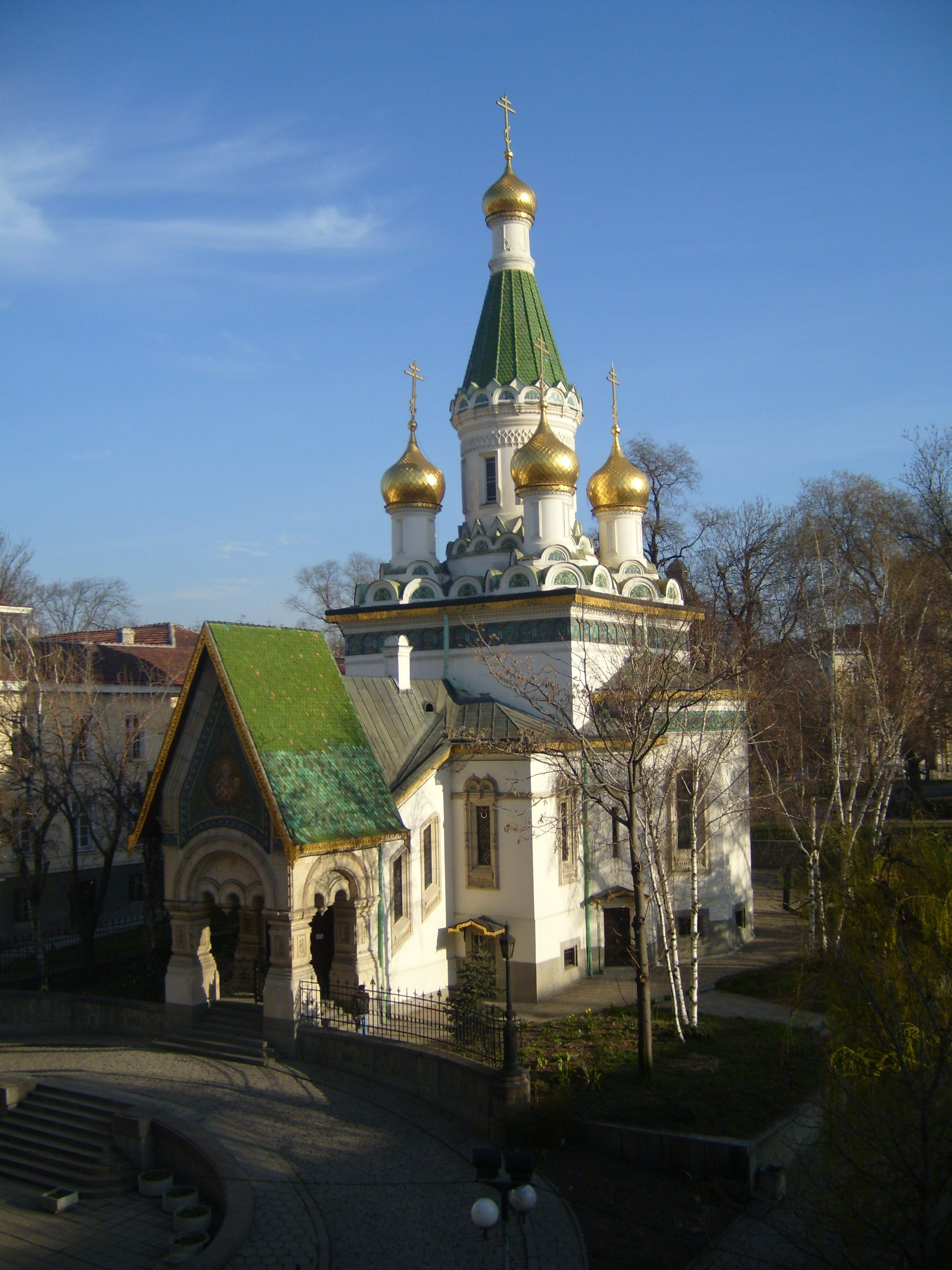

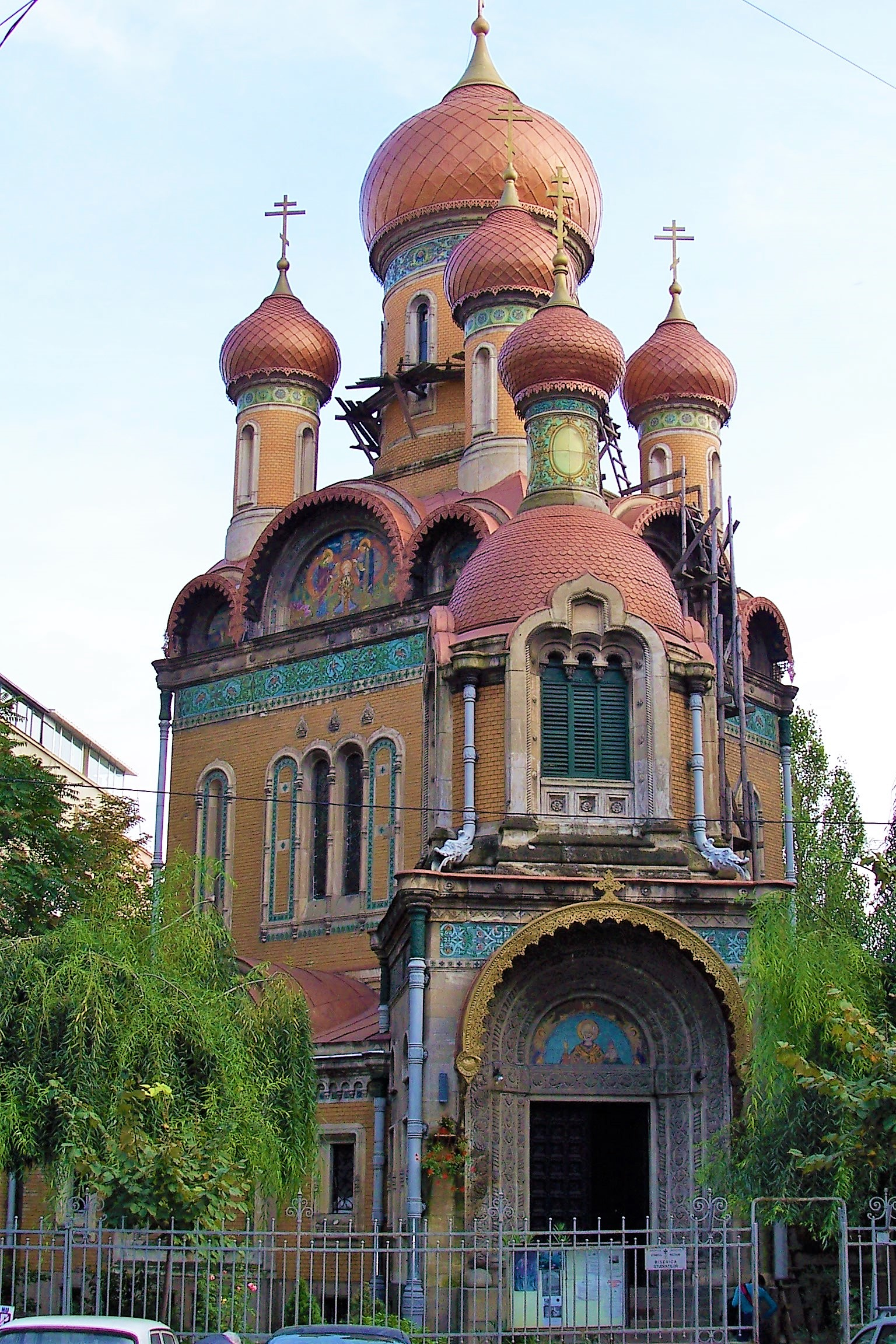

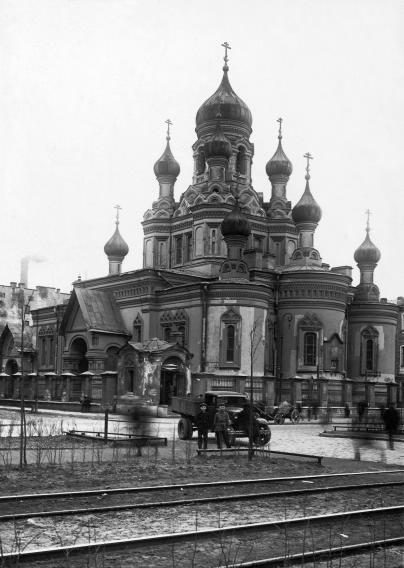

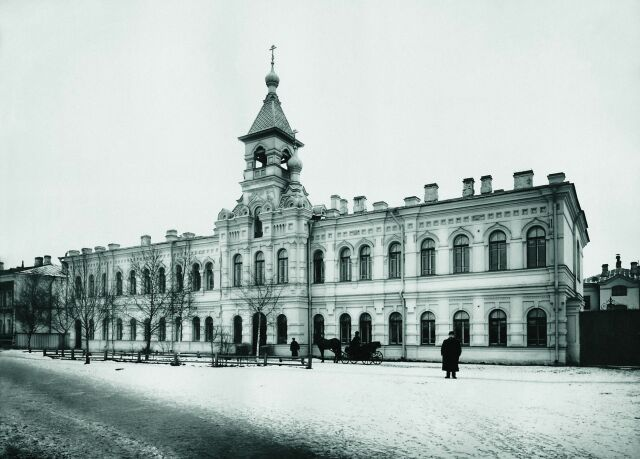

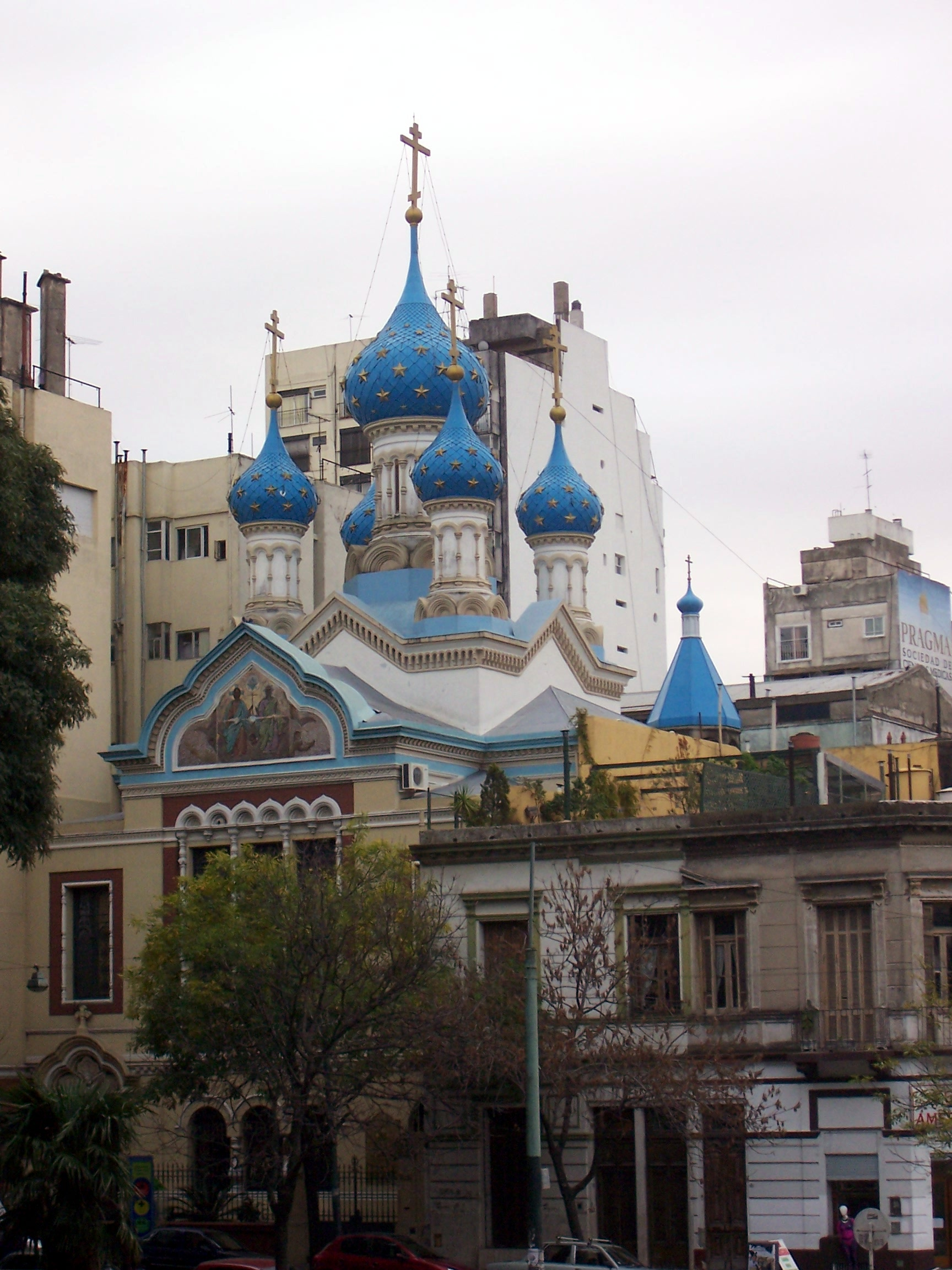

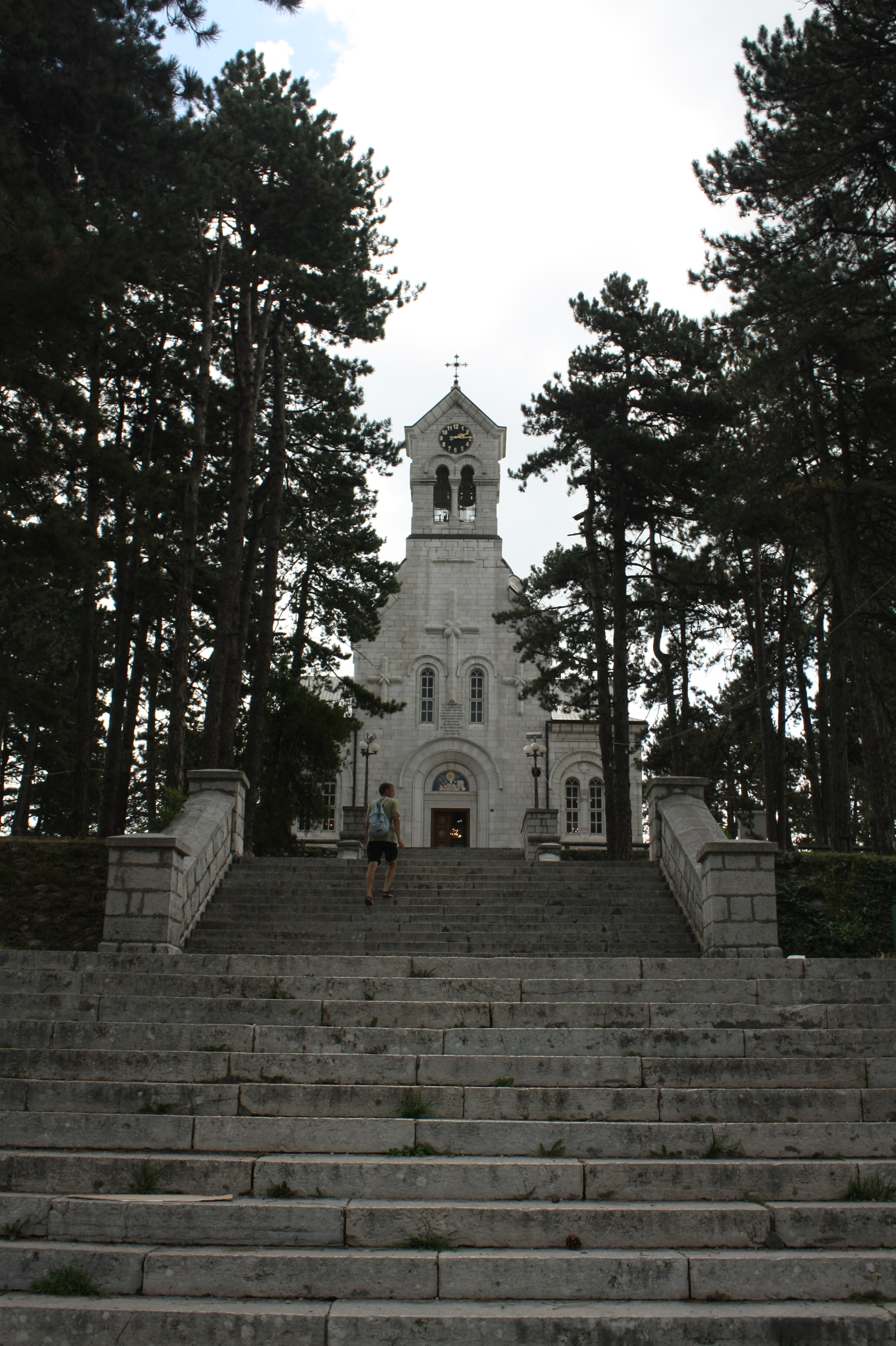

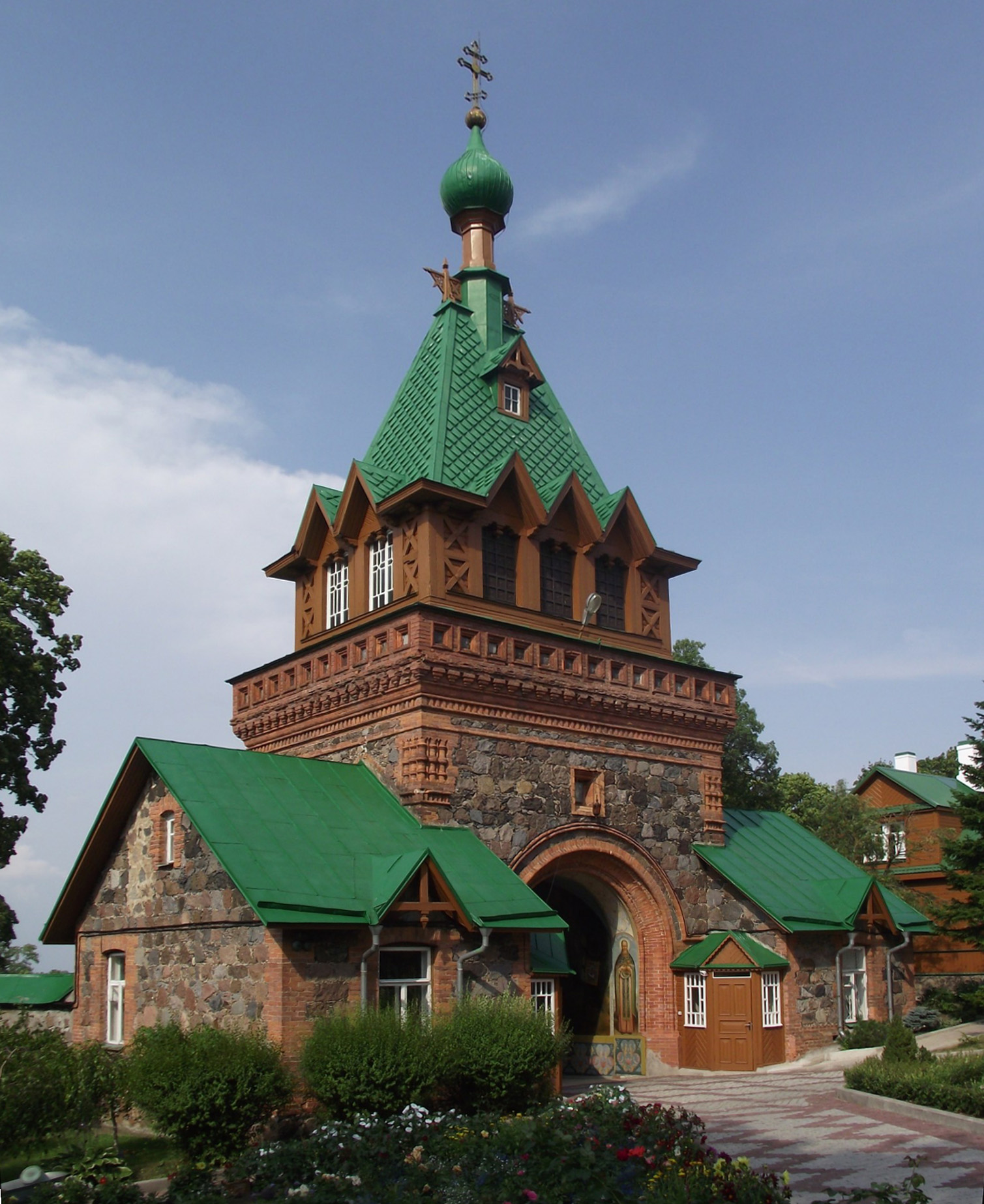

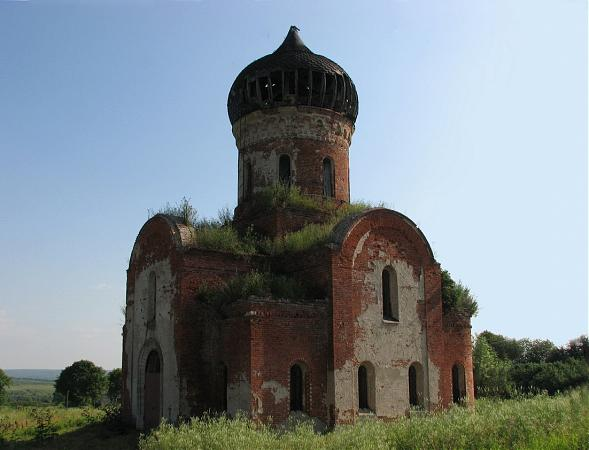
