= Naro-Fominsky District =

Naro-Fominsky District Наро-Фоминский район (Russian)
- District
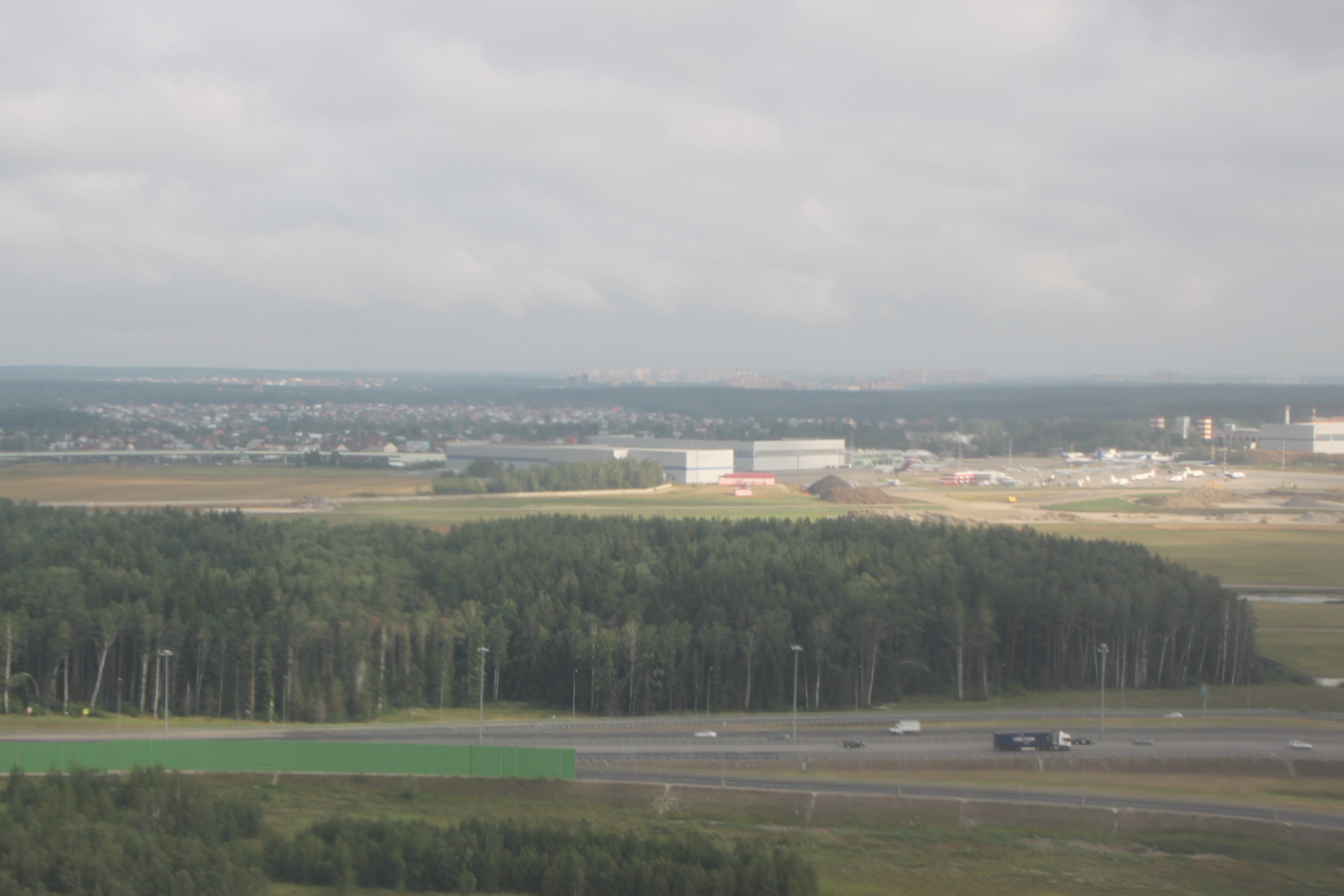
- Approaching Vnukovo, Naro-Fominsky District

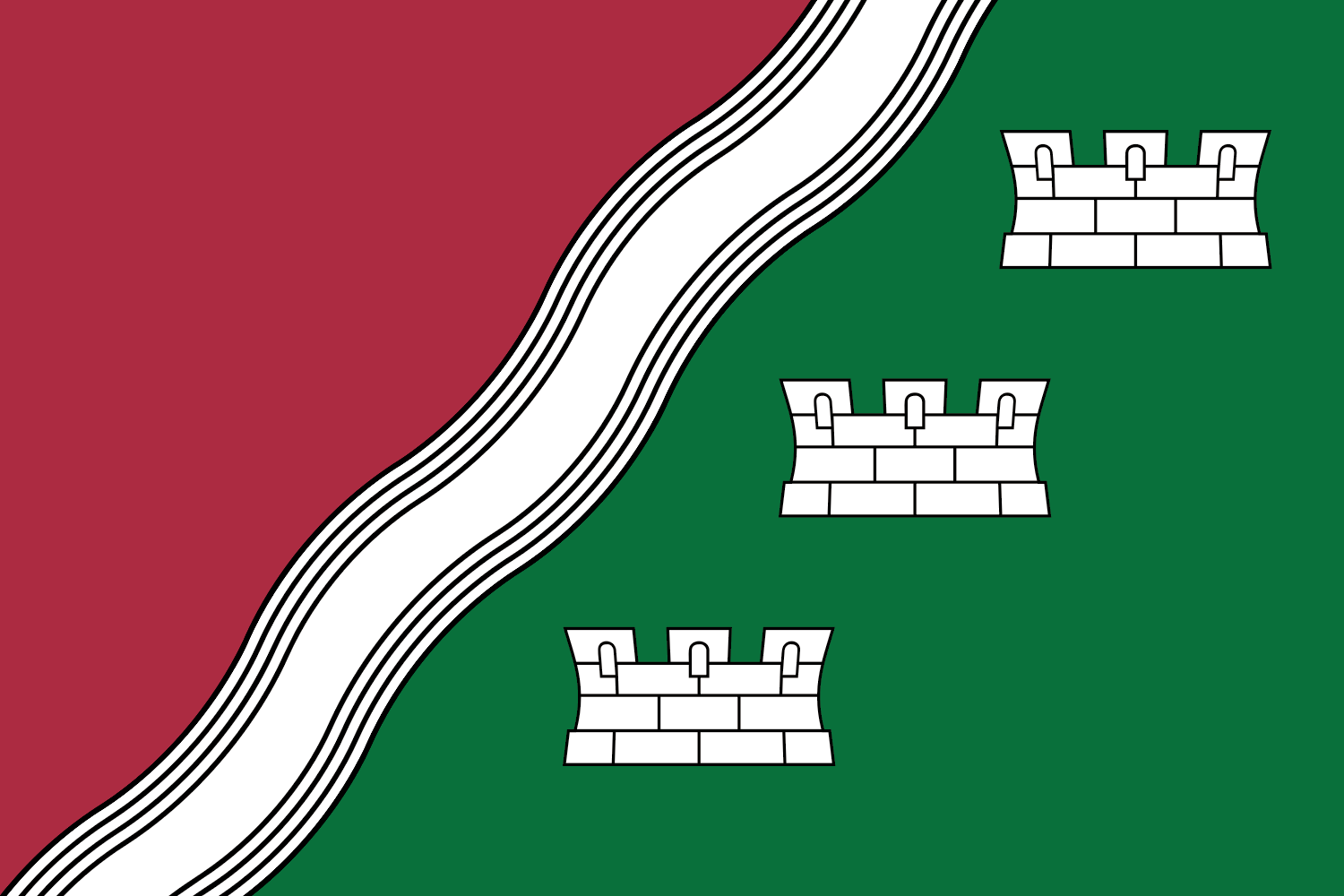
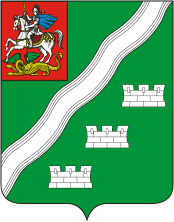
- Flag Coat of arms
- Location of Naro-Fominsky District in Moscow Oblast (before July 2012)
- Coordinates: 55°23′N 36°44′E
- Country: Russia
- Federal subject: Moscow Oblast
- Established: 24 May 2017
- Administrative center: Naro-Fominsk

Area
  - Total: 1,547.44 km^{2} (597.47 sq mi)

Population (2010 Census)
  - Total: 189,763
  - Density: 122.630/km^{2} (317.611/sq mi)
  - Urban: 75.1%
  - Rural: 24.9%

Administrative structure
  - Administrative divisions: 3 Towns, 2 Work settlements and suburban settlements, 4 Rural settlements
  - Inhabited localities: 3 cities/towns, 2 urban-type settlements, 201 rural localities

Municipal structure
  - Municipally incorporated as: Naro-Fominsky Municipal District
  - Municipal divisions: 5 urban settlements, 4 rural settlements
- Time zone: UTC+3 (MSK)
- OKTMO ID: 46750
- Website: http://www.narofominsk.ru/

Naro-Fominsky District (Russian: Наро-Фоминский райо́н) is an administrative and municipal district (raion), one of the thirty-six in Moscow Oblast, Russia. It is located in the southwest of the oblast. The area of the district is 1,547.44 square kilometers (597.47 sq mi). Its administrative center is the town of Naro-Fominsk. Population: 189,763 (2010 Census); 191,596 (2002 census); 112,685 (1989 Soviet census). The population of Naro-Fominsk accounts for 34.1% of the district's total population.

A part of Naro-Fominsky District was merged into the federal city of Moscow on July 1, 2012.

The oldest building in the district is the Kamenskoye Church. There is also Church of Demetrius of Thessaloniki in Dubrovo village.
