= Diocese of Moscow =

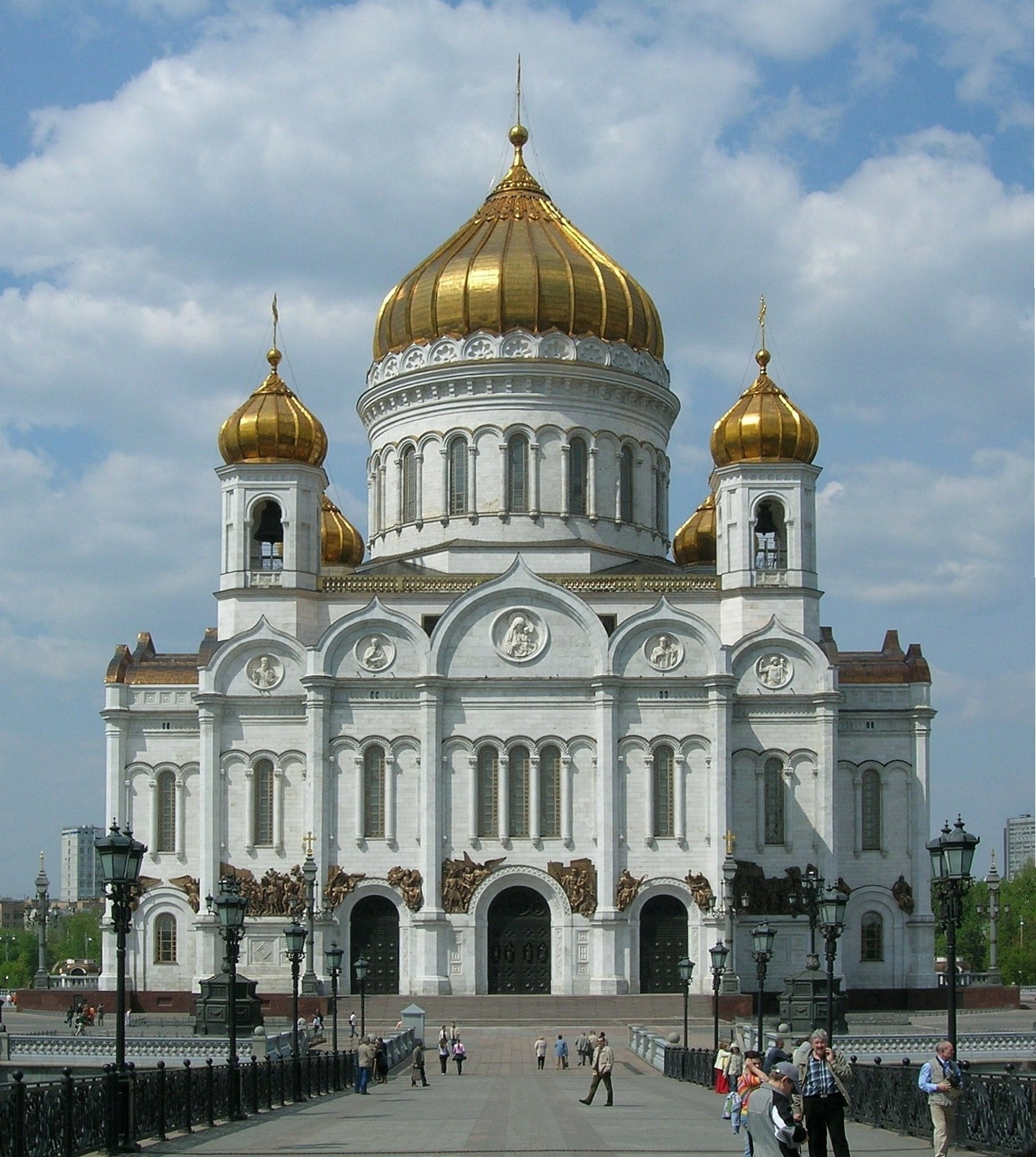
Cathedral of Christ the Saviour in Moscow

The Urban Diocese of Moscow (Russian: Московская городская епархия) is a conventional name of church administrative institution of Russian Orthodox Church in the city of Moscow. The head of the diocese (eparchy) is the Patriarch of Moscow and All Rus'.

The diocese consists of stauropegic monasteries, cathedrals and churches of Moscow Kremlin, and parish churches, divided into 10 vicariates, which are, in turn, divided into 27 blagochiniyes (deaneries).
