= Pentahedron =

Polyhedron with five faces

In geometry, a pentahedron (pl.: pentahedra) is a polyhedron with five faces or sides. There are no face-transitive polyhedra with five sides, and there are two distinct topological types. Notable polyhedra with regular polygon faces are:

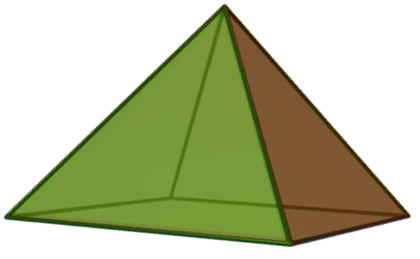
Square pyramid with four triangles and one square. Pyramids with any quadrilateral base have the same number of faces.

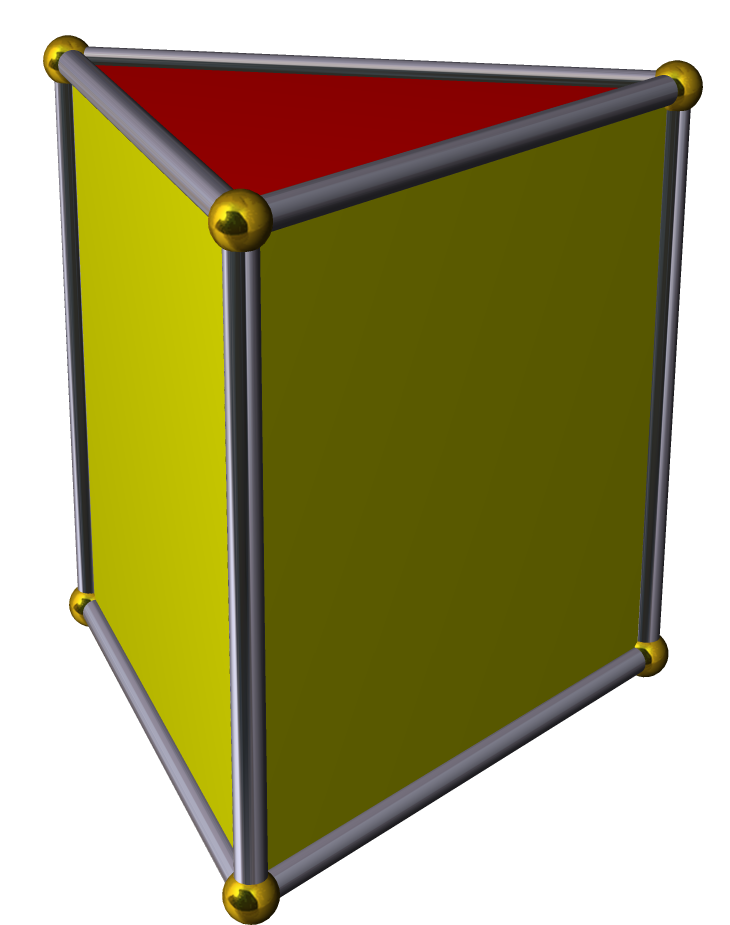
Triangular prism with three rectangles and two triangular bases. In the case of a right triangular prism, it is a special case of wedge with connecting parallel edges between triangles; the wedge generally has two triangles and three quadrilateral faces. Topologically, the triangular frustum is the same polyhedron, but the two triangles are different sizes, and the sides are slanted trapezoids.

The pentahedra can be space-filling.

== Concave ==
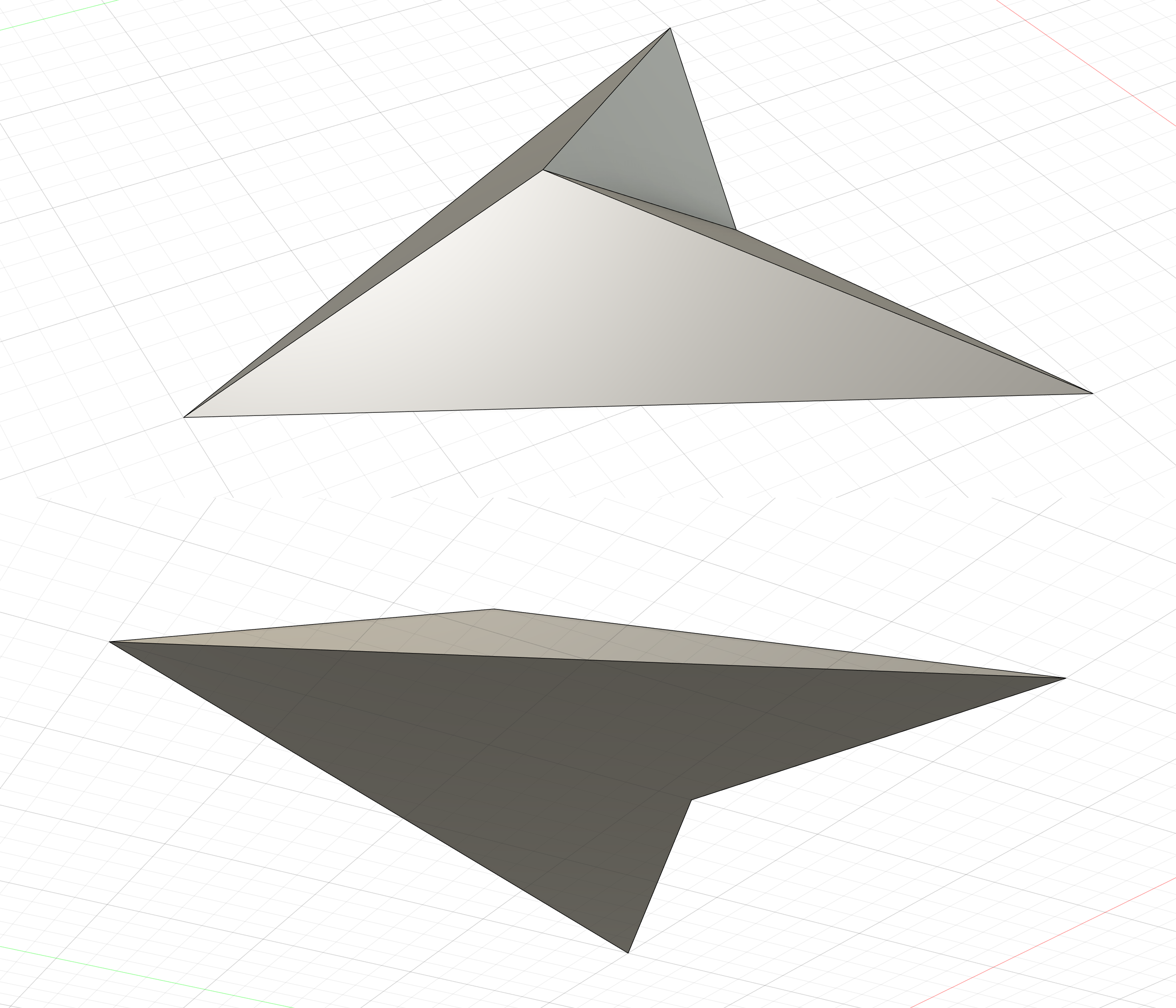
Above: a concave pentahedron viewed from its apex. Below: the same object viewed from its concave face.

An irregular pentahedron can be a non-convex solid: Consider a non-convex (planar) quadrilateral (such as a dart) as the base of the solid, and any point not in the base plane as the apex.

== Hosohedron ==
There is a third topological polyhedral figure with 5 faces, degenerate as a polyhedron: it exists as a spherical tiling of digon faces, called a pentagonal hosohedron with Schläfli symbol {2,5}. It has 2 (antipodal point) vertices, 5 edges, and 5 digonal faces.
