= Giuseppe Boccini =

Italian architect

- Born: 13 November 1840
- Died: 31 December 1900 (aged 60); Florence, Italy
- Citizenship: Italian
- Education: Royal Academy of Fine Arts, Florence
- Occupation: Architect
- Known for: Architecture

Giuseppe Boccini (November 13, 1840 - December 31, 1900) was an Italian architect.

He studied architecture in his native Florence, in the Royal Academy of Fine Arts under Emilio De Fabris, and then entered the studio of Mariano Falcini. He was knighted with the Order of the Crown of Italy, became professor of the Consiglio Accademico of Florence, Correspondent Associate of the Royal Accademia Raffaello of Urbino, and Honorary Associate of the Institute of Fine Arts in Urbino. He helped design some of the palaces facing the Piazza della Repubblica, Florence. His major works include:

- Cassa di Risparmio in Imola (1879)
- Gothic Funeral Chapel for Nicolaev (1881, Odessa, Russia), commissioned by Admiral General Niccolò Arcas
- New Evangelical Cemetery of Florence, outside Porta Romana (Begun 1877)
- Episcopal Church in Piazza del Carmine, Florence, 1881
- Gothic Funeral Chapel for the Lodomez family
- Cemetery of San Miniato al Monte, Florence (1876)
- Gothic Funeral Chapel for Gattai-Budini Family (1881)
- Villa (Quattrocento Style), near Città di Castello, for Baron Franchetti
- Villa of Ernesto Rossi in Montughi (1887–88).

== Sources ==
- Dizionario degli Artisti Italiani Viventi: pittori, scultori, e Architetti., by Angelo de Gubernatis. Tipe dei Successori Le Monnier, 1889, page 59.
- Dizionario Biografico degli Italiani - Volume 11 (1969)
