= Irena Veisaitė =

Lithuanian theatre scholar and human rights activist (1928–2020)

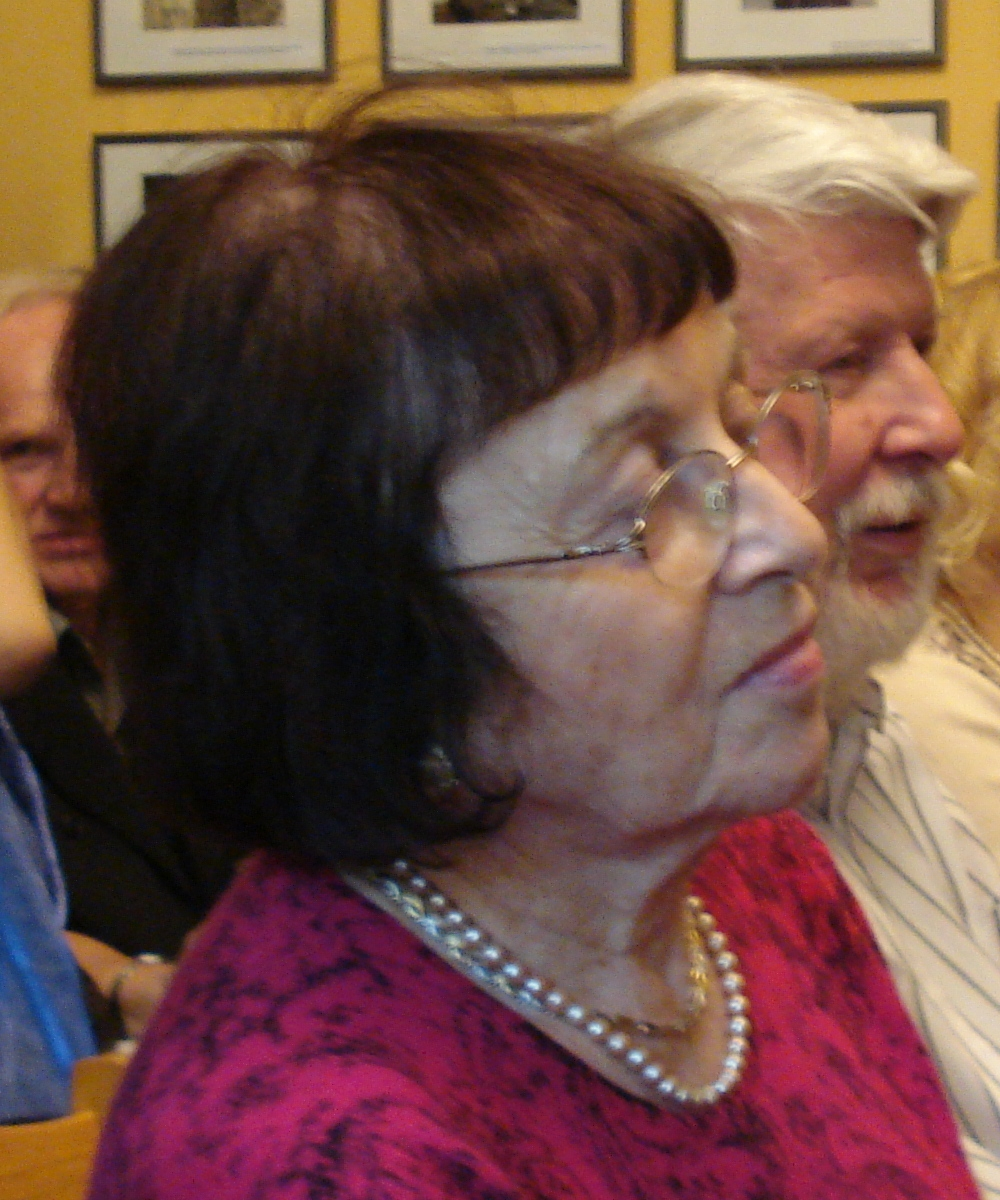
- Veisaitė, June 2009
- Born: 9 January 1928; Kaunas, Lithuania
- Died: 11 December 2020 (aged 92); Vilnius, Lithuania
- Occupations: Theatre scholar and human rights activist
- Known for: Awarded Goethe Medal, 2012
- Spouse: Grigori Kromanov

Irena Veisaitė (9 January 1928 – 11 December 2020) was a Lithuanian theatre scholar, intellectual and human rights activist.

She was awarded the Goethe Medal in 2012 for her contribution to cultural exchange between Germany and Lithuania.

== Life and career ==
Veisaitė was a Lithuanian Jew. She was born in Kaunas and survived the Holocaust. She earned a doctorate in Leningrad in 1963 with a dissertation on the poetry of Heinrich Heine, and was a lecturer at the teacher's college in Vilnius from 1953 to 1997. She was also head of the Thomas Mann Cultural Centre in Nida, Lithuania.

She was the president of the Open Society in Lithuania Foundation.

She said in an interview with Deutsche Welle that "the Soviets were very, very bad. Different from the Nazis, but not better."

In Moscow in 1952 Veisaite married a young Jewish economist named Jakov (Jasha) Boom. Later she married the Estonian film director Grigori Kromanov, with whom she remained until his death in 1984. She died of COVID-19 in Vilnius on 11 December 2020, during the COVID-19 pandemic in Lithuania, twenty nine days short of her 93rd birthday.
