= Jokūbas Šernas =

Lithuanian politician (1888–1926)

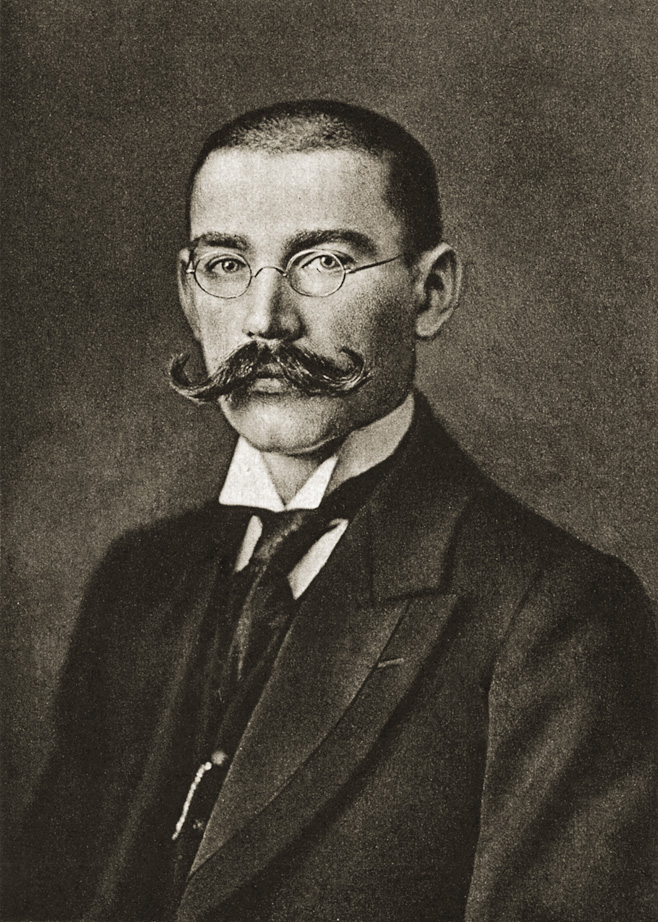
- Born: 27 June 1888; Jasiškiai, Russian Empire
- Died: 31 July 1926 (aged 38); Kaunas, Lithuania
- Education: University of Dorpat; University of Saint Petersburg
- Political party: Party of National Progress
- Children: Jacques Sernas
- Relatives: Adomas Šernas (brother)

Jokūbas Šernas (27 June 1888 – 31 July 1926) was a Lithuanian activist and one of the twenty signatories to the Act of Independence of Lithuania.

He studied law at the University of St. Petersburg, graduating in 1914. After he returned to Lithuania, he edited the daily newspaper Lietuvos žinios. During World War I, he joined the Lithuanian Society for the Relief of War Sufferers and taught history at the Lithuanian Rytas Gymnasium. He helped organize the Vilnius Conference and was elected to the Council of Lithuania, which adopted the Act of Independence of Lithuania on 16 February 1918. Šernas was the secretary of the Council of Lithuania from September 1917 to March 1919 handling its paperwork and day-to-day business. From February 1918 to March 1919, he was one of the four members of the presidium that acted in the council's name while it was not in session.

Šernas was a member of various special government commissions, including those that organized the Second Conference of the State of Lithuania, investigated the deaths of Jurgis Smolskis and Feliksas Valiukas and Kaunas garrison mutiny, drafted the Third Temporary Constitution of Lithuania. From 12 April to 7 October 1919, Šernas was the minister without portfolio in the Sleževičius Cabinet II. In February–March 1920, Šernas worked to convince four members of the National Council of Lithuania Minor to join the Council of Lithuania. It was accomplished on 20 March 1920 which was celebrated as a symbolic unification of Lithuania Minor with Lithuania.

Šernas was not elected to the Constituent Assembly of Lithuania. He then turned to business ventures becoming a board member of the Trade and Industry Bank. He was also involved with breweries Gubernija and Ragutis, and insurance company Lietuvos Lloydas. In 1925, he returned to government service to head the Municipalities Department of the Ministry of Internal Affairs. He died of stomach cancer in July 1926. His son Jacques Sernas became an actor in France and United States.

== Biography ==
=== Early life and education ===
Jokūbas Šernas was born on 27 June [O.S. 15 June] 1888 1888 in Jasiškiai near the present-day Latvia–Lithuania border. His family were members of the Lithuanian Evangelical Reformed Church. He had ten siblings, but four of them died in childhood. His brother Adomas Šernas became superintendent of the Evangelical Reformed Church in 1942. His family maintained contact with Jurgis Bielinis, a Lithuanian book smuggler who lived in nearby Purviškiai I.

Šernas attended primary school in Nemunėlio Radviliškis which was about 3 kilometres (1.9 mi) north from home. It was a Russian school maintained by the Evangelical Reformed Church. In 1903, enrolled at the third grade of the Slutsk Gymnasium. It was an old Evangelical Reformed school, but Tsarist authorities took control of the school in 1881. Nevertheless, it remained popular among the congregation. In 1906, Šernas was expelled from the school for supporting the Russian Revolution of 1905. Initially, he was prohibited from attending another school. However, he managed to get help from Alexander Schwartz, curator of the Riga Educational District, and enroll at the private German Hugo Treffner Gymnasium in Dorpat. He graduated in July 1910.

Šernas then enrolled at the University of Dorpat to study law. Many Evangelical Reformed students, including Šernas's brother Adomas, attended the university. However, after just a year, Šernas transferred to the University of Saint Petersburg. He received a stipend from the Evangelical Reformed Church. He joined a Lithuanian student society and was its chairman for a year. There is some evidence that, together with Martynas Yčas, he planned on publishing Lithuanian newspaper Lietuvių balsas, but it was published only in August 1915. In December 1914, he passed his final exams but did not submit thesis required for a diploma.

=== Activist in Vilnius ===
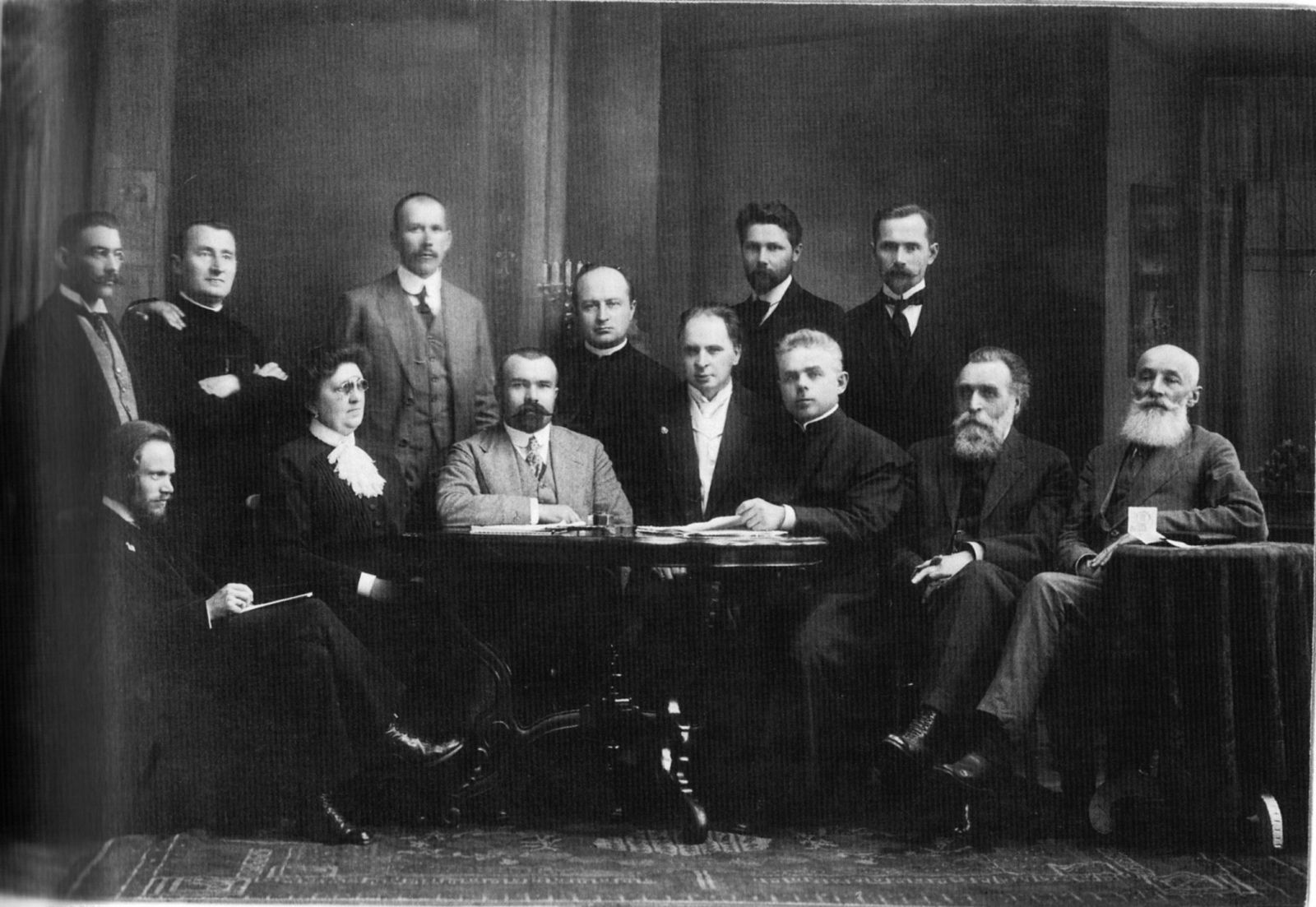
Central committee of the Lithuanian Society for the Relief of War Sufferers (Šernas stands on the left)

In 1914, Šernas returned to Lithuania and settled in Vilnius. He worked as the editor of the daily Lietuvos žinios from January to July 1914. He joined the Lithuanian Society for the Relief of War Sufferers and was elected to its central committee in December 1914. In January 1915, he became a clerk (secretary) of the Lithuanian Society and earned a salary of 100 Russian rubles.

Unlike many other Lithuanian activists, he did not retreat to Russia when Germans occupied the city in September 1915. Instead, he temporarily became the head of the Infant Jesus Shelter (originally established in 1787) which housed 166 children. In December 1915, he took over an orphanage in Šnipiškės which was previously headed by Antanas Žmuidzinavičius. Šernas helped organizing the Lithuanian Rytas Gymnasium and became its history teacher (he taught until March 1918). He was a member of a commission of the Lithuanian Society that collaborated with the Lithuanian Education Society Rytas and assisted in organizing Lithuanian primary schools. In 1917, Šernas worked on relocating the orphanage from Šnipiškės to Žasliai and establishing a new orphanage in Vievis. In fall 1918, he became a member of the Lithuanian Scientific Society.

=== Vilnius Conference ===
Šernas was politically active. Already in 1916, he participated in informal meetings that discussed Lithuania's political future, was one of the Lithuanian representatives supervising the March 1916 German census in Vilnius, and later signed a protest letter questioning the validity of the census results.

As German military advances stalled, German leadership rethought their strategy for occupied Lithuania. The policy of open annexation was replaced by a more subtle strategy of creating a network of formally independent states under German influence (the so-called Mitteleuropa). To that end, Germans asked Lithuanians to establish an advisory council (Vertrauensrat). Lithuanians started organizing Vilnius Conference which would elect such council, which became known as the Council of Lithuania. Šernas's brother Adomas was one of the 22 members of the conference's organizing committee.

Šernas registered attendees of Vilnius Conference and was a member of a commission which investigated why only 213 out of 264 delegates arrived to the conference. The conference convened in September 1917. Šernas, as a nonpartisan candidate, received 119 votes for and 85 votes against, and was elected to the 20-member Council of Lithuania.

=== Council of Lithuania ===
==== Independence proclamation ====
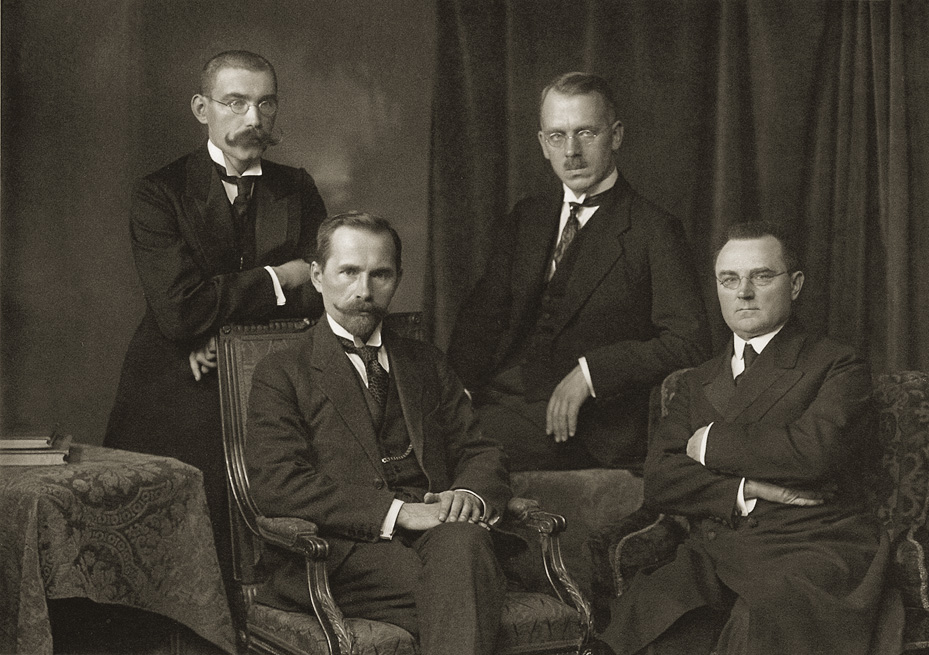
Four-member presidium of the Council of Lithuania (Šernas stands on the left)

The council first convened on 24 September 1917. Šaulys was elected its secretary and continued in this role until 14 March 1919. In February 1918, Šernas became one of the four members of the council's presidium which acted in council's name while it was not in session. As secretary, Šernas prepared official meeting protocols, handled paperwork and bookkeeping, managed the office and its repairs, and other day-to-day business.

Šernas, together with Antanas Smetona and Jurgis Šaulys, was believed that Lithuania should align with Germany. Therefore, he supported the Act of 11 December 1918 which called for an independent Lithuania but called for "a firm and permanent alliance" with Germany. This caused a crisis within the council and four members withdrew in protest. However, the members reached a compromise and adopted the Act of Independence of Lithuania on 16 February 1918. In June 1918, the four-member presidium (including Šernas) decided to invite Wilhelm Karl, Duke of Urach, to become the King of Lithuania. The proclaimed monarchy was controversial and four council members resigned in protest. In July 1918, Šernas initiated the renaming of the council to the State Council of Lithuania to better reflect Lithuania's political ambitions. However, the Germans rejected the new name and it was not fully adopted.

In summer 1918, Šernas was a member of a commission that investigated the causes of banditry (which they attributed to escaped POWs) and drafted plans for a Lithuanian police force. They petitioned General Max Hoffmann, the German chief of the staff in east, and Rudolf Nadolny, the acting head of the Eastern Department of the German Foreign Office. However, the petitions were rejected. On 20 October 1918, a Lithuanian delegation, including Šernas, traveled to Berlin for an official meeting with Prince Maximilian of Baden, the new chancellor of the German Empire.

==== After the German surrender ====
Lithuanians gained more freedom of action after the Armistice of 11 November 1918 and organized the first cabinet of ministers. The First Temporary Constitution was adopted on 2 November 1918. It envisioned the Council of Lithuania as a parliament (legislative branch) and its presidium as a collective presidency. On 15 November 1918, the Council of Lithuania elected Kazys Bizauskas as the first secretary, which made Šernas the second secretary. Šernas was primarily in charge of the presidium's affairs, while Bizauskas primarily dealt with council's affairs. This increased Šernas's political influence.

At the outbreak of the Lithuanian–Soviet War at the end of December 1918, Council's chairman Antanas Smetona and Prime Minister Augustinas Voldemaras left to Germany to request financial aid. This left the government in a crisis. Šernas participated in meetings in which Mykolas Sleževičius agreed to step up and form a new government. Sleževičius considered declaring himself a dictator similar to the Chief of State in Poland, but was staunchly opposed by Šernas.

On 15 November 1918, Šernas was elected to a commission that organized the Second Conference of the State of Lithuania. Šernas with Stasys Šilingas became the primary authors of the law on this conference. Šernas became one of the six committee members that were tasked with organizing the conference which convened in January 1919 in Kaunas. The conference exposed the deep conflict between the Council of Lithuania and the government of Mykolas Sleževičius. Šernas, along with others, attempted to mediate. In the end, Sleževičius prevailed and the Council of Lithuania effectively suspended its activities until Sleževičius's resignation in October 1919.

=== Minister without portfolio ===
On 12 April 1919, Šernas became the minister without portfolio in the Sleževičius Cabinet II. Šernas was tasked with secretarial duties of preparing law drafts for deliberation. He was also tasked with maintaining contacts with the National Council of Lithuania Minor which called for the unification of Lithuania Minor with Lithuania.

In summer 1919, Šernas chaired a commission sent to investigate the deaths of Jurgis Smolskis and Feliksas Valiukas while in custody of the 2nd Infantry Regiment commanded by Vincas Grigaliūnas-Glovackis. He concluded that these were extrajudicial murders and the cases were referred to a military court.

In August 1919, Augustinas Voldemaras and Martynas Yčas returned from the Paris Peace Conference and started protesting the inaction of the Council of Lithuania. On 25 September 1919, four ministers from the Party of National Progress, including Šernas, submitted their resignation. The cabined officially dissolved on 7 October 1919. Šernas later stated that the government sought to become a dictatorship, ignored the Council of Lithuania, and wanted to gain control of the Lithuanian Army. The Party of National Progress resisted these attempts and so no other option than to resign.

=== Government commissions ===
In November 1919, the Council of Lithuania sent Šernas and Aleksandras Stulginskis to Šiauliai to report on the Lithuanian–Bermontian War. Šernas published a lengthy article on this trip in Tauta.

In December 1919, Šernas became a member of the 9-member commission, chaired by Liudas Noreika, to draft the Third Temporary Constitution of Lithuania which was adopted by the Constituent Assembly of Lithuania in June 1920.

On 10 February 1920, the Council of Lithuania sent Šernas to the National Council of Lithuania Minor in Klaipėda. Klaipėda Region was detached from East Prussia by the Treaty of Versailles and became a mandate of the League of Nations. The official handover to the French administration under General Dominique Joseph Odry occurred on 15 February 1920. The following day, Šernas brought three representatives of Prussian Lithuanians to Kaunas for the official celebration of the 2nd anniversary of the Act of Independence of Lithuania. However, the representatives hesitated joining the Council of Lithuania as they wanted assurances of religious freedom. Šernas and Petras Klimas then travelled to Klaipėda to negotiate with the National Council. As a result of these efforts, four Prussian Lithuanians were coopted to the Council of Lithuania on 20 March 1920. The day was celebrated as a symbolic unification of Lithuania Minor with Lithuania (the actual unification occurred only after the Klaipėda Revolt in January 1923). Šernas was tasked with the preparation of a book commemorating the occasion which was published in October 1921.

On 8 March 1920, Šernas became a member of a commission, chaired by Augustinas Voldemaras, to investigate the Kaunas garrison mutiny. On 31 March 1920, Šernas became a member of a commission to investigate procurement process of the Ministry of Defence.

=== Party of National Progress ===
Šernas was elected to the Council of Lithuania as nonpartisan delegate but later (possibly in July 1918) he joined the Party of National Progress. He was elected to party's central committee in November 1919. In 1920, Šernas was party's vice-chairman. He ran in the April 1920 election to the Constituent Assembly of Lithuania. Šernas organized rallies in Kaunas, Panevėžys, Biržai, Pasvalys. However, no members of the party were elected to the assembly.

Šernas continued to involved with the party. In November 1920, he was one of the co-founders of its publishing company Raštas ir spauda. He was a member of a committee organizing the August 1924 conference which saw the merger of the Party of National Progress and the Economic and Political Union of Lithuanian Farmers into the newly founded Lithuanian Nationalist Union.

At some point, Šernas joined the Farmers' Association which was affiliated with the Lithuanian Christian Democratic Party. He was chairman of association's chapter in Kaunas. Reportedly, due to this membership, Šernas got a job at the Ministry of Internal Affairs in 1925.

=== Evangelical Reformed Church ===
Šernas was the only member of the Evangelical Reformed Church among the 20 signatories of the Act of Independence. Šernas was an active member of the congregation and was synod's curator from 1918 to his death in 1926. In November 1918, he was elected to the church's Control Committee. In 1920, he worked on finding land for churches in Deltuva and Naujamiestis. In 1922, Šernas became vice-chairman of the Lithuanian Evangelical Reformed Society. It sought to provide financial and spiritual assistance to its members. In 1925, the society dropped "Reformed" from its name and invited members of the Evangelical Lutheran Church in Lithuania to join.

=== Business ventures ===
In December 1919, Šernas was elected to the council of the Trade and Industry Bank. In 1922, he became a director and board member. However, the bank was mismanaged and suffered losses. Šernas resigned in 1925, while the bank went bankrupt in 1927. He was also involved with the insurance company Lietuvos Lloydas.

Šernas was also chairman of Gubernija brewery which was owned by Vladimir Zubov. In January 1922, a group of investors, which included Šernas, Martynas Yčas, and Adomas Prūsas, purchased a brewery owned by Julius Blumenthal. The brewery was substantially modernized and expended, and renamed Ragutis. However, it struggled to repay debts, ceased operations around 1928, and was sold to Gubernija in 1938.

=== Municipalities Department ===
In 1925, Šernas got a job at the Ministry of Internal Affairs. On 15 June 1925, he became the director of the Municipalities Department of the ministry. In this position, Šernas was involved in several conflicts. He forced Jonas Vileišis, mayor of Kaunas, to resign his teaching position at the University of Lithuania due to the conflict of interest. Vileišis protested and returned to the university after Šernas's death. Another conflict concerned municipal elections in Pasvalys and Paberžė. District Court in Šiauliai ruled that Šernas violated law in handling the matter. Šernas also edited journal Savivaldybė published by the department.

After the May 1926 election, the Social Democratic Party of Lithuania and the Lithuanian Popular Peasants' Union gained majority. Šernas was forced to resign from the Municipalities Department on 16 July 1926. He received six months of severance which attracted attention from government auditors and political opponents. At the time, he was undergoing treatment for stomach cancer and travelled to Königsberg for surgery. It was not successful and Šernas died on 31 July 1926. He was buried in Nemunėlio Radviliškis. While Šernas was third youngest of the signatories, he was the first to die.

== Personal life ==
Šernas was married twice. In November 1915, he married Kleopa Florentina Brijūnaitė (born 1895). They worked together at the orphanage in Šnipiškės and at the Lithuanian Rytas Gymnasium. The wedding was attended by many prominent Lithuanians, including Jonas Basanavičius, Antanas Smetona, Petras Klimas, Aleksandras Stulginskis, Augustinas Janulaitis, Peliksas Bugailiškis, priest Juozapas Kukta. Their daughter was born in October 1917; her godfather was the Catholic priest Povilas Dogelis. However, Šernas submitted divorce paperwork to the Evangelical Reformed Church in September 1922. In her explanation to the Diocese of Samogitia, Brijūnaitė-Šernienė claimed that the marriage was invalid because they married in the Evangelical Reformed Church and not the Roman Catholic Church. After the divorce, she moved to the United States.

In November 1922, Šernas married Vera Feinberg (1900–1971), daughter of fur traders from Saint Petersburg. Their son Jokūbas Bernardas Šernas (later known as Jacques Sernas) was born in July 1925, just a year before Šernas's death. Widowed Vera moved to Paris where her Lithuanian surname Šernienė was rendered as Charnasse. She remarried in 1930 and published three works of fiction in 1930s.

== Bibliography ==
- Andrukaitienė, Irena (26 June 2018). "Gyvenimas vardan Lietuvos" (in Lithuanian). Voruta.
- Akmenytė, Vilma; Milerytė, Giedrė (2007). "Viešųjų asmenų privatūs interesai: nuo "Bliumental" iki "Ragučio": alaus pramonės raida Kaune XIX a. pab. – XX a. pirmoje pusėje". Kauno istorijos metraštis (in Lithuanian). 8: 105–126.
- Bitautas, Algis (2016). "Šernas Jokūbas" (PDF). In Tamošaitis, Mindaugas; Bitautas, Algis; Svarauskas, Artūras (eds.). Lietuvos Respublikos 1918–1940 m. vyriausybių ministrų biografinis žodynas (in Lithuanian). Vilnius: Mokslo ir enciklopedijų leidybos centras. pp. 407–410. ISBN 978-5-420-01778-4.
- Eidintas, Alfonsas; Žalys, Vytautas; Senn, Alfred Erich (1999). Tuskenis, Edvardas (ed.). Lithuania in European Politics: The Years of the First Republic, 1918-1940 (Paperback ed.). New York: St. Martin's Press. ISBN 0-312-22458-3.
- Jurevičiūtė, Aušra (2020). "Lietuvos kariuomenė Steigiamojo Seimo rinkimų išvakarėse ir rinkimų įstatymo pakeitimas". Parlamento Studijos (in Lithuanian). 29: 46–81. ISSN 1822-749X.
- Grigaravičius, Algirdas (8 October 2019). "Keletas Jokūbo Šerno politinės veiklos epizodų" (in Lithuanian). Voruta.
- Lapas, Raimundas Marius (9 March 2013). "Už kiekvieno didžio vyro – didi moteris! Likimo suvestos Paryžiuje". Draugas (in Lithuanian). Vol. CIV, no. 29. pp. 7, 14.
- Maksimaitis, Mindaugas (2011). Mažoji konstituanta: Lietuvos taryba atkuriant valstybingumą (in Lithuanian). Justitia. ISBN 978-9955-616-65-8.
- Selenis, Valdas (2022). Nepriklausomybės akto signataras Jokūbas Šernas. Vilnius: Lietuvos nacionalinis muziejus. ISBN 978-609-478-058-5.
- Tamošaitis, Mindaugas (2020). Atsisakęs būti Lietuvos diktatoriumi: politikas Mykolas Sleževičius (in Lithuanian). Mokslo ir enciklopedijų leidybos centras. ISBN 9785420018316.
- Terleckas, Vladas (2000). Lietuvos bankininkystės istorija 1918-1941 (in Lithuanian). Lietuvos banko Leidybos ir poligrafijos skyrius. ISBN 9986-651-26-3.
- Terleckas, Vladas (2001). Lietuvos bankininkai: gyvenimų ir darbų pėdsakai (in Lithuanian). Vilnius: Lietuvos bankas. ISBN 9986651271.
