= Adomas Šernas =

Lithuanian evangelical reformed priest (1884–1965)

- Born: 25 May 1884; Jasiškiai, Russian Empire
- Died: 6 January 1965 (aged 80); Nemunėlio Radviliškis, Lithuanian SSR
- Education: University of Dorpat
- Occupation: Priest
- Relatives: Jokūbas Šernas (brother)

Adomas Šernas (25 May 1884 – 6 January 1965) was a Lithuanian priest of the Lithuanian Evangelical Reformed Church and its superintendent from 1942 until his resignation in 1964.

Educated at the University of Dorpat, Šernas became an ordained priest in 1913 and was assigned as parson to Švobiškis. During World War I, he evacuated to Russia where he continued to serve communities of evacuated Lithuanian Protestants, both Calvinists and Lutherans. In 1916–1917, he organized aid to deportees from East Prussia on behalf of the Tatiana Committee. In 1917, he returned to Lithuania and worked to organize Vilnius Conference which elected his brother Jokūbas Šernas to the Council of Lithuania. In 1920–1924 and 1934–1940, Šernas was chaplain of the Lithuanian Army. He was pastor in various Evangelical Reformed parishes, including Papilys, Nemunėlio Radviliškis, Kėdainiai, Seirijai. In June 1942, Biržai Synod elected Šernas as the superintendent of the Lithuanian Evangelical Reformed Church. In 1964, at the age of 80, Šernas was diagnosed with terminal cancer and resigned his positions with the church. A month later, his lengthy letter was published in the communist daily Tiesa in which he denounced religion and the church embracing atheism. Circumstances of his apostasy remain unclear, but the Evangelical Reformed Church has rehabilitated him in 2019.

Šernas published several religious texts. In 1934, Šernas published translations of the Gospel of Matthew and Gospel of Luke. In 1936, he published a shortened Lithuanian version of the Heidelberg Catechism. Šernas worked to edit, newly translate, or write original hymns. These efforts resulted in two ecumenical hymnals – shorter hymnal for Lithuanian soldiers published in 1938 and general hymnal published in 1942. While Lithuanian Lutherans rejected this hymnal, it became the official hymnal of the Evangelical Reformed Church in 1986.

== Biography ==
=== Early life and education ===
Šernas was born on 25 May [O.S. 13 May] 1884 in Jasiškiai near the present-day Latvia–Lithuania border. His family were members of the Lithuanian Evangelical Reformed Church. He had ten siblings, but four of them died in childhood. His brother Jokūbas Šernas became signatory of the Act of Independence of Lithuania. His family maintained contact with Jurgis Bielinis, a Lithuanian book smuggler who lived in nearby Purviškiai I.

Šernas learned to read at home. At the age of nine, he attended a primary school in Nemunėlio Radviliškis which was about 3 kilometres (1.9 mi) north from home. It was a Russian school maintained by the Evangelical Reformed Church. In 1895, he enrolled at the Riga Gymnasium and completed three classes. He then received a stipend from the Evangelical Reformed Church and transferred to the Slutsk Gymnasium. It was an old Evangelical Reformed school, but Tsarist authorities took control of the school in 1881. Nevertheless, it remained popular among the congregation.

In 1905, upon graduation from the gymnasium, he enrolled at the University of Dorpat to study theology and philosophy. He graduated in 1913.

=== World War I ===
Šernas was ordained deacon on 24 March 1913 and priest on 23 June 1913. He was assigned as parson to Švobiškis and at the same time served the parish of Naujamiestis and filial church in Aukštelkai.

During World War I, he evacuated to Simbirsk (now Ulyanovsk) in Russia where he continued to serve communities of evacuated Lithuanian Protestants, both Calvinists and Lutherans. He visited various Russian cities, generally located south of the Moscow–Kazan line, including Kostroma, Nizhny Novgorod, Saratov, Samara. In 1916–1917, together with Petras Žemaitis, he organized aid to deportees from East Prussia on behalf of the Tatiana Committee (the funding was obtained by Martynas Yčas).

In 1917, he returned to Lithuania via Sweden. He served parishes of Papilys and Švobiškis. He was a member of a 22-person committee that organized the Vilnius Conference which elected his brother Jokūbas to the Council of Lithuania. Šernas was also a candidate to the council, but he received 84 votes for, and 120 votes against and was not elected. He was not a member of any political party. Šernas was the one to suggest using the word nepriklausomybė instead of previously used liuosybė and neprigulmybė for "independence". His proposal was adopted and now nepriklausomybė is part of the standard Lithuanian.

=== Interwar Lithuania ===
In 1920–1924 and 1934–1940, Šernas was chaplain of the Lithuanian Army.

In 1922, he was tasked with serving the parish of Salamiestis and organizing a parish in Kaunas. In 1923, Šernas was reassigned from Papilys to his native Nemunėlio Radviliškis. In addition to religious affairs, Šernas worked on improving local economic conditions. In Papilys, he founded and headed a consumer cooperative. In Nemunėlio Radviliškis, he headed a local credit union and dairy.

In 1927, he obtained a teaching permit and started teaching Latin, mathematics, and other subjects at the Progymnasium of Namunėlio Radviliškis and Biržai Gymnasium. In 1930, he was assigned to the parish of Biržai and as gymnasium's chaplain.

He was assigned to parishes of Kėdainiai in 1934, Seirijai in 1935, Švobiškis, and Nemunėlio Radviliškis in 1941. On 25 June 1942, Biržai Synod elected Šernas as the superintendent of the Lithuanian Evangelical Reformed Church.

=== Soviet Lithuania ===
After World War II, there were only four Evangelical Reformed priests left in Lithuania. The first post-war meeting was held in May 1946. Soviet authorities did not allow to convene a synod until August 1957 (the 400th anniversary of the first Lithuanian synod in 1557). At this synod, Šernas was elected vice-chairman of the consistory.

In 1964, at the age of 80, Šernas was diagnosed with terminal lung cancer. He submitted his resignation from the consistory on 5 July and transferred all duties to Povilas Jašinskas. An abridged letter by Šernas was published in Biržiečių žodis on 11 August and full 17-page version was published in Tiesa on 16 August. The publication was titled Kodėl aš darau tokį žingsnį (Why am I taking such a step?). Supposedly, he wrote the letter titled in Latin Non credo, quia absurdum est (I don't believe, because it is absurd) on 1 June 1964 but it was unknown to his congregation. In this letter, Šernas denounced religion and the church and embraced atheism.

Evangelical reformats generally rejected the letter and believed that Šernas was somehow coerced by the Soviet authorities, potentially as part of a wider anti-religious campaign in the Soviet Union. This belief was further bolstered by the fact that 8,000 copies of a separate booklet with Šernas's letter were published in 1971. In her 2015 book on atheism in Soviet Lithuania, author Nerija Putinaitė claimed that Šernas might have approached the Lithuanian representative of the Council for the Affairs of Religious Cults in hopes of getting a state pension which would elevate his family from poverty.

Šernas died on 6 January 1965. He was buried next to his brother Jokūbas and sisters in Nemunėlio Radviliškis. In June 2019, the Lithuanian Evangelical Reformed Church posthumously rehabilitated Šernas and returned his titles of superintendent and vice-president of consistory.

== Works ==
=== Religious texts ===
Šernas started writing religious texts around 1927. In 1936, he published a shortened Lithuanian version of the Heidelberg Catechism; the full catechism was published in 1943. In 1934, financed by the British and Foreign Bible Society, Šernas published translations of the Gospel of Matthew and Gospel of Luke (the other two gospels were translated by Povilas Jakubėnas). He translated the New Testament from Koine Greek and Psalms from Biblical Hebrew.

Šernas also published articles in the Lithuanian press and delivered sermons on Kaunas Radio. Several of his works remain unpublished, including a short history of the Christian church, short history of the reformation in Lithuania, Bible studies, as well as poems and songs for choirs. During his life, Šernas compiled a collection of 65 handwritten sermons. This handmade book is kept in the personal archive of his relative superintendent Tomas Šernas.

=== Hymnals ===
Šernas was particularly interested in poetry and religious hymns. For several years, Šernas worked to collect, edit, and modernize some 800 hymns. He also wrote a few hymns, including those expressing love for the homeland.

While the Evangelical Reformed Church used hymnal published by Stanislovas Dagilis in 1910, Lithuanian Lutherans did not have a separate hymnal and used a Germanized hymnal published for Prussian Lithuanians. In 1936, consistory of the Klaipėda Region decided to republish the old Prussian hymnal which was written in outdated language and contained references to Kaiser Wilhelm II. This prompted Lutherans in Kaunas into action.

They decided to publish an ecumenical hymnal in hopes of fostering further unity among the Lithuanian reformed Christians and enlisted Šernas to work on the hymnal. They first published a hymnal for Lithuanian soldiers as a test for the larger hymnal. The 241-page soldiers' hymnal with 114 hymns, 38 prayers, newly translated Luther's Small Catechism, and shortened Heidelberg Catechism was published in 1938. 65 of the hymns were taken from the Prussian Lithuanian hymnal, 13 were taken from the evangelical reformed hymnal, 28 from other hymnals, and 8 were original works by Šernas. This publication was sponsored by the General Staff of Lithuania.

The work on the main hymnal, sponsored by the Ministry of Education, was slower. In September 1937, pastor Jonas Pauperas reviewed 697 hymns received from Šernas and found that only 179 hymns could be published without correction. Other hymns needed minor changes (150), major revisions (55), were of questionable suitability (253), or outright unacceptable (65). Therefore, a three-member commission was appointed to review the hymns. A new hymnal with about 500 hymns was prepared for publication in 1940, but its printing was interrupted by World War II. Due to changes in leadership, the Lithuanian Lutherans no longer pursued the project. Thus, the Evangelical Reformed Church took it upon itself to have it published. It was shortened to 388 hymns and catechisms were removed. The 639-page hymnal was published in July 1942. The Lutherans rejected the hymnal and most of its copies were lost after a flood in 1946. The Evangelical Reformed Church was slow to adopt the hymnal, but it became the official hymnal in 1986. It is the 8th substantial revision of the Evangelical Reformed hymnal. It was republished in 2001.

Šernas prepared a third hymnal which included 300 hymns aimed at youth. However, it was not published and its manuscript was lost. There is evidence that he continued working on a hymnal in 1950s.

== Personal life ==
Šernas married Zuzana. They had no children, but helped their relatives. In particular, Šernas raised Irena Danutė, the first-born daughter of his brother Jokūbas Šernas, and helped take care of his widow Vera and his son Jacques Sernas. When Irena Danutė retreated west after World War II, Šernas adopted her daughter Nijolė Kristina. Šernas also educated and looked after his nephews Adomas and Jokūbas who later became curators of the Evangelical Reformed Church.

== Bibliography ==
- Arlauskienė, Aurelija (17 July 2014a). "Evangelikų reformatų bažnyčios superintendento kunigo Adomo Šerno 130-osios gimimo metinės". Mokslo Lietuva (in Lithuanian). 14 (524): 3, 10. ISSN 1392-7191.
- Arlauskienė, Aurelija (4 September 2014b). "Evangelikų reformatų bažnyčios superintendento kunigo Adomo Šerno 130-osios gimimo metinės". Mokslo Lietuva (in Lithuanian). 15 (525): 8–10. ISSN 1392-7191.
- Andrukaitienė, Irena (26 June 2018). "Gyvenimas vardan Lietuvos" (in Lithuanian). Voruta.
- Andrukaitienė, Irena (31 August 2019a). "Tarnavęs tėvynei ir tautai" (PDF). Voruta (in Lithuanian). 8 (862): 11. ISSN 1392-0677.
- Andrukaitienė, Irena (30 September 2019b). "Tarnavęs tėvynei ir tautai" (PDF). Voruta (in Lithuanian). 9 (863): 11. ISSN 1392-0677.
- Butkevičius, Algirdas (27 July 2019). "Sugrąžinta tiesa apie kunigą, mokytoją, giesmių kūrėją" (in Lithuanian). Lietuvos evangelikų reformatų Bažnyčia – Sinodas.
- Grigaravičius, Algirdas (8 October 2019). "Keletas Jokūbo Šerno politinės veiklos epizodų" (in Lithuanian). Voruta.
- Petkūnas, Darius (2014). Lithuanian Lutheran Church during World War Two (PDF). Klaipėdos universiteto leidykla. ISBN 978-9955-18-846-9.
- Petkūnas, Darius (2019). "1942 m. "Ekumeninis" giesmynas ir jo įdiegimo sunkumai". Tiltai. Priedas (in Lithuanian). 49: 41–68. ISSN 1648-3979.
- Piročkinas, Arnoldas (2016). "Tiesa be meilės ir pagarbos – ne patriotizmas". Metai (in Lithuanian). 5–6.
- Raškauskas, Kęstutis (1 August 2025). "Biblijos vertimai į lietuvių kalbą". Lituania Christiana (in Lithuanian).
- Selenis, Valdas (2022). Nepriklausomybės akto signataras Jokūbas Šernas. Vilnius: Lietuvos nacionalinis muziejus. ISBN 978-609-478-058-5.
- Sperskienė, Rasa (2013). "Reformatų kunigų Jono Šepečio ir Povilo Jakubėno veiklos pėdsakais" (PDF). Lietuvos mokslų akademijos Vrublevskių biblioteka. 2009–2010: 78–82. ISSN 1648-9772.
