= Julius Blumenthal =

- Born: 12 January 1868; Kaunas, Russian Empire
- Died: After July 1940
- Education: Imperial Moscow University; Tartu University
- Occupation: Publisher
- Awards: Order of the Lithuanian Grand Duke Gediminas (1938)

Julius Blumenthal (Russian: Юлиус Максович Блюменталь; 12 January 1868 – after July 1940) was the publisher of several Russian-language daily newspapers in Kaunas (then part of the Russian Empire and later of the interwar Lithuania).

Blumenthal was educated as an attorney. In 1904, he founded Kovenskiy Telegraf, the first Russian daily newspaper in the Kovno Governorate. Renamed to Severo-Zapadnyy Telegraf, it was published until World War I. In 1929, he took over the publication of the daily Echo (Эхо) which was published until July 1940. He was also involved in several shorter-lived newspapers, including Ponedelnik (1907–1908), Moskovskoye Slovo (1914), Litovskiy golos (1933–1935), Litovskiy vestnik (1935–1939), and Nasha zhizn (1940).

He was also active in public life. He was elected to the city council of Kaunas and, during World War I, he supported the Lithuanian Society for the Relief of War Sufferers.

== Publishing ==
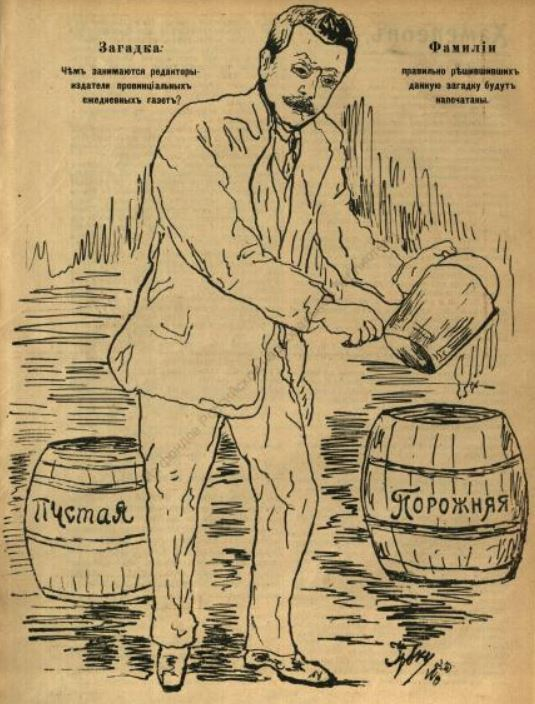
Caricature of Blumenthal published in 1910 shows him pouring from empty into a hole (similar English idiom is pouring water into a sieve)

Born in Kaunas on 12 January 1868, Blumenthal studied law at the Imperial Moscow University and Tartu University. For some time, he worked in Moscow as a journalist where he was noticed by Vlas Doroshevich. However, he returned to Kaunas and worked as an attorney.

In September 1904, he founded the daily newspaper Kovenskiy Telegraf (Ковенский Телеграф) which was renamed to Severo-Zapadnyy Telegraf (Северо-Западный Телеграф) in 1907. It was the first Russian daily in the Kovno Governorate. It was a progressive newspaper that defended the rights of minorities in the Russian Empire and was supportive of the Constitutional Democratic Party (Kadets). Blumenthal had frequent issues with the Russian censors. In one instance, he was punished with one month of jail or a fine of 100 rubles for publishing physical description of Yevno Azef. It was a political but nonparty, social, and literary newspaper that was published until the outbreak of World War I in July 1914. In 1907–1908, Blumenthal also published the daily socio-political and literary newspaper Ponedelnik (Понедельник).

At the start of World War I, Blumenthal was expelled from Kaunas and lived in Moscow. There, he published the daily Moskovskoye Slovo (Московское слово) from August to October 1914. After the war, he returned to Kaunas. In 1929, he took over the publication of the daily Echo (Эхо) which was established in 1920. He was deputy editor of the daily Litovskiy golos (Литовскiй голосъ) published in 1933–1935. From October 1935 to November 1939, he also published the daily Litovskiy vestnik (Литовскiй вѣстник). On 16 June 1940, he established the daily Nasha zhizn in Vilnius. However, both Echo and Nasha zhizn were banned on 5 July 1940 (three weeks after the Soviet occupation of Lithuania). They were labelled as "reactionary" and accused of receiving funds from the Lithuanian intelligence.

== Other activities ==
His father owned Blumenthal brewery in Kaunas. It was established around 1866 and transferred to Blumenthal's ownership in 1898. It ceased operations during World War I. In January 1922, the brewery was purchased by a group of investors which included Jokūbas Šernas, Martynas Yčas, and Adomas Prūsas. The brewery was substantially modernized and expended and renamed Ragutis. However, it struggled to repay debts, ceased operations around 1928, and was sold to Gubernija in 1938.

In addition to publishing work, Blumenthal was active in city's life. He organized voters for the elections to the State Duma and supported a voting bloc of Jews and Lithuanians. He was also elected to the city council of Kaunas. During World War I, he supported the Lithuanian Society for the Relief of War Sufferers becoming its legal advisor and board member. In 1904, he recruited ten subscribers needed for the first telephone service in the city.

Blumenthal was awarded the Order of the Lithuanian Grand Duke Gediminas (4th degree) on the 20th anniversary of Lithuania's independence in 1938. His date of death is unknown. He died sometime after July 1940.
