= Jurgis Alekna =

Lithuanian physician and activist

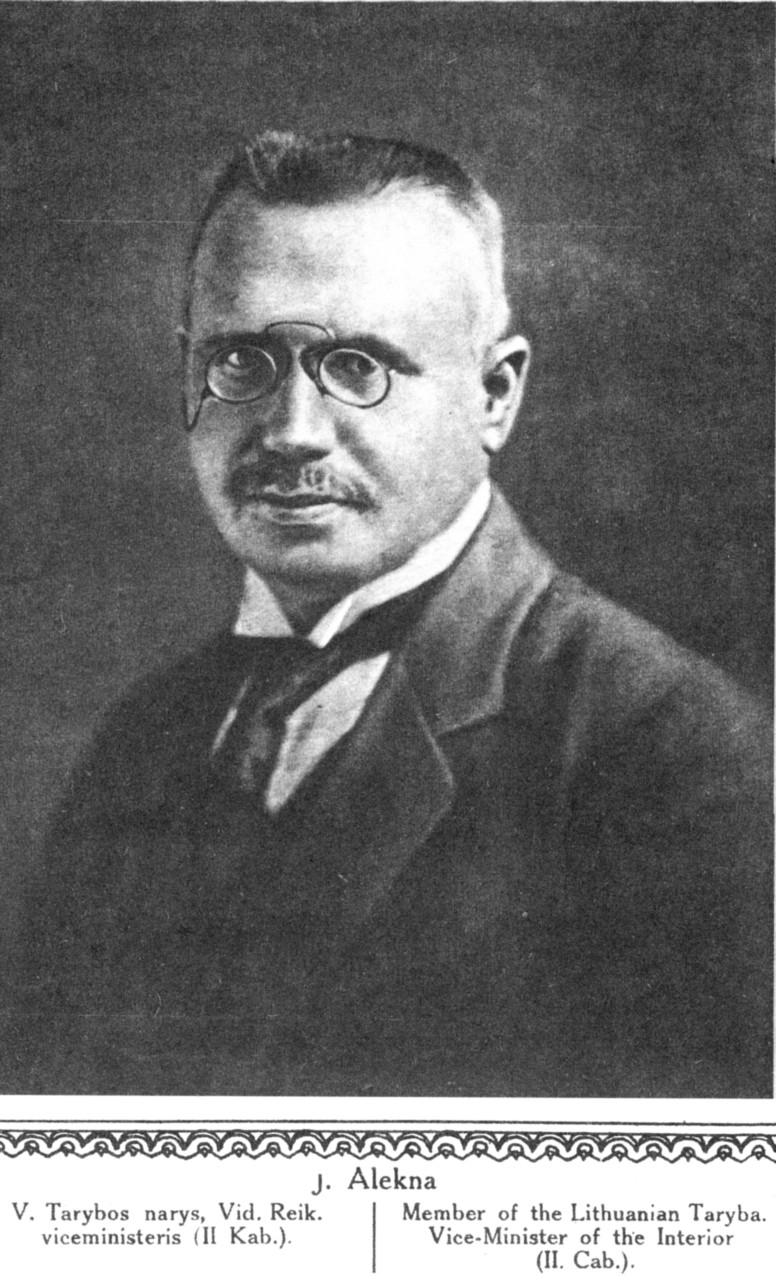
- Alekna in Lithuania Album (1921)
- Born: 16 February 1873; Sidabrinė, Russian Empire
- Died: 17 October 1952 (aged 79); Kaunas, Lithuanian SSR
- Education: Imperial Moscow University
- Occupation: Physician
- Board member of: Lithuanian Red Cross; Scout Association of Lithuania

Jurgis Alekna (16 February 1873 – 17 October 1952) was a Lithuanian physician and activist.

Educated at the Imperial Moscow University, he completed his PhD thesis on otolaryngology (ear, nose, and throat) in Berlin and Vienna in 1910. He worked as a doctor in various locations in Lithuania (Vilnius, Ukmergė, Zarasai, Rozalimas, Kaunas). During World War I, he worked with the Red Cross in the Northern Front. After the war, he was long-term director of the otolaryngology department of Kaunas Red Cross Hospital.

He returned to Lithuania in 1918 and joined the Council of Lithuania. As the first director of the Health Department and vice-minister of the interior, Alekna worked on building a healthcare system in Lithuania. He left the government in March 1919, but continued to be active in Lithuanian public life. He was co-founder of the Lithuanian Red Cross (chairman in 1936–1940), the Medical Society of Kaunas, Scout Association of Lithuania (chief in 1922–1925), and a society to support scouts in Lithuania (chairman in 1919–1924 and 1929–1935).

== Biography ==
=== Russian Empire ===
Alekna was born on 16 February [O.S. 4 February] 1873 in Sidabrinė near Kuktiškės in the present-day Utena District Municipality. Alekna grew up in Želtiškiai Manor near Skiemonys. He obtained his school education from private teachers. After graduating from the 2nd Vilnius Gymnasium in 1893, he enrolled at the Imperial Moscow University to study medicine.

He graduated in 1898 and was assigned as a doctor to a hospital in the Smolensk Governorate. Few months later, he transferred to the Hospital of St. Jacob in Vilnius and then to Onega in Russia. In 1900, he traveled in western Europe (Germany, France, Switzerland, Austria) learning from local doctors.

In 1900, the Tsarist police began a wide investigation of activists connected to Liudas Vaineikis for violations of the Lithuanian press ban. Alekna was arrested in September 1900 as the police found three issues of Varpas in his possession. He spent about two months in a prison in Liepāja and was sentenced to two years of exile to the Arkhangelsk Governorate. Upon his return to Lithuania, he worked as a physician in Ukmergė, Zarasai, Rozalimas.

In 1909, he completed courses on bacteriology to be able to contribute more in fighting cholera and typhus outbreaks. He then travelled to Berlin and Vienna to study otolaryngology (ear, nose, and throat). He wrote his thesis and earned a PhD in 1910. He returned to Lithuania and worked in Kaunas until he was drafted to the Imperial Russian Army during World War I. He worked with the Red Cross in the Northern Front.

=== Independent Lithuania ===
==== Career ====
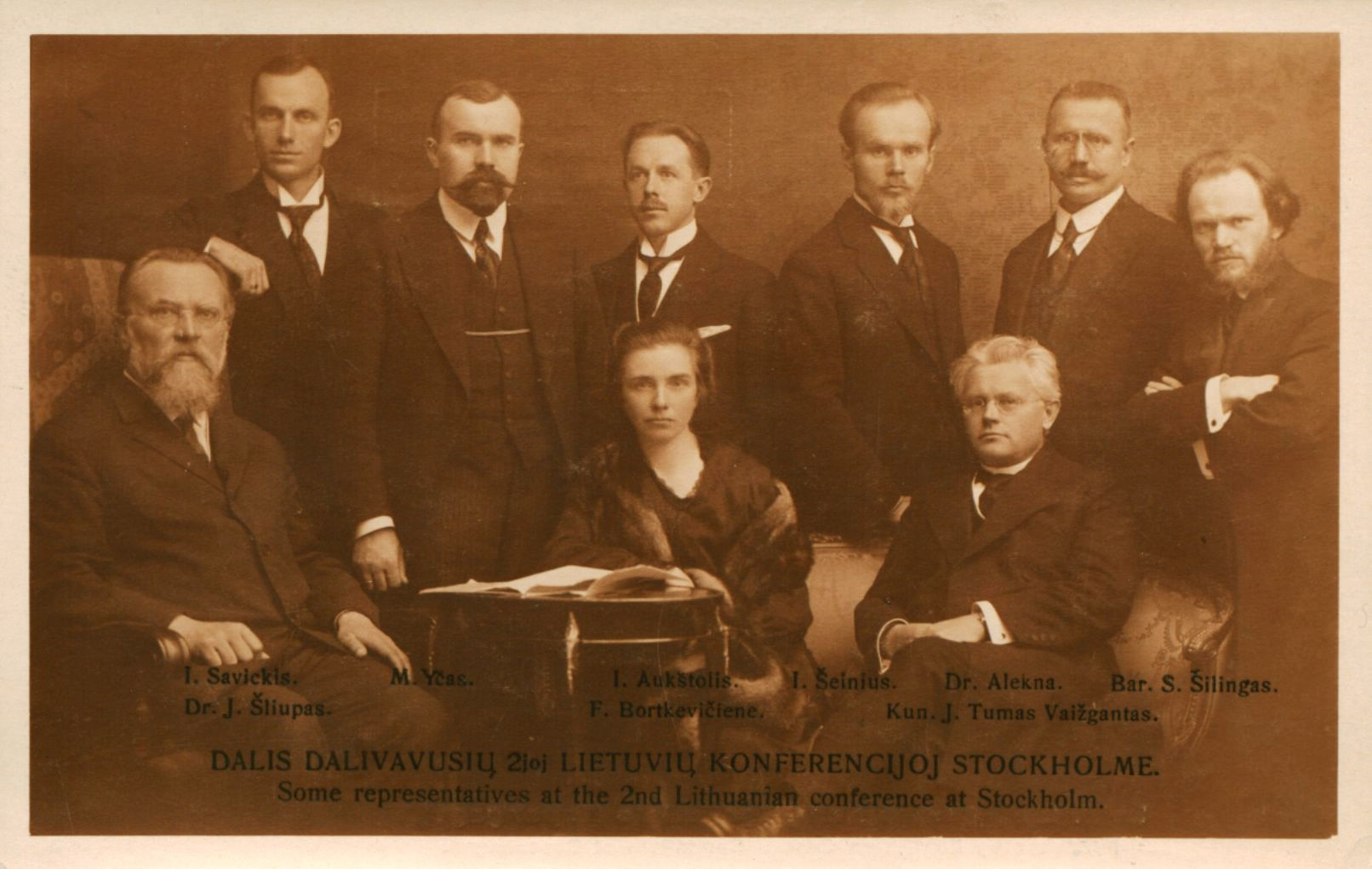
Alekna (standing second from right) at the Lithuanian conference in Stockholm

In October 1917, Alekna attended the Lithuanian conference in Stockholm which recognized the Council of Lithuania as the main representative of the Lithuanian nation. In February 1918, the Supreme Lithuanian Council in Russia wanted to send three Lithuanian representatives – Alekna (then residing in Petrograd), Mykolas Sleževičius from Voronezh, and Augustinas Voldemaras from Moscow – to the negotiations of the Treaty of Brest-Litovsk. In May 1918, Alekna led a delegation of Lithuanians from Russia to the Council of Lithuania in Vilnius. The delegation argued for the establishment of armed units from Lithuanian war refugees that would grow into the Lithuanian Army.

Alekna returned to Lithuania in 1918 and joined the Health Commission of the Council of Lithuania (other members were Jonas Basanavičius, Steponas Kairys, and Justinas Staugaitis). He was officially coopted by the council on 13 July 1918 when four leftist members resigned in protest of the attempt to establish monarchy in Lithuania. Together with Stasys Šilingas, he represented center-right Democratic National Freedom League known as Santara. In November 1918, the Health Commission was reorganized into the Health Department of the newly formed Ministry of Internal Affairs. Alekna became director of this department (equivalent to minister of health since there was no separate Health Ministry) and vice-minister of the interior. He worked on rebuilding the healthcare system in Lithuania which was devastated by the war. He left the government in March 1919.

Alekna was a long-term director of the otolaryngology department of Kaunas Red Cross Hospital. Martynas Yčas, Jonas Yčas, Saliamonas Banaitis, Alekna, and others established the Trade and Industry Bank, which was approved in December 1918 becoming the first Lithuanian bank. Alekna became chairman of its board. The bank went bankrupt in 1927 and Alekna, along with others, was tried for mismanagement. He was acquitted in March 1936.

==== Public work ====
In 1919, Alekna worked to establish the Lithuanian Red Cross of which he was chairman in 1936–1940. He also co-founded the Medical Society of Kaunas and contributed articles to its magazine Medicina. In October 1919, Alekna became a member of a committee tasked with organizing the Higher Courses in Kaunas which evolved into the Vytautas Magnus University. In 1939, he became chairman of a committee to aid residents of Klaipėda Region who fled after the takeover by Nazi Germany in March 1939.

In 1919, Alekna, together with Pranas Sližys, organized a society to support scouts in Lithuania (Lietuvos skautams remti draugija). He was its chairman from 1919 to 1924 and from 1929 to 1935 when the society was closed. In 1922, he became chief of the newly established Scout Association of Lithuania. He was replaced by President Aleksandras Stulginskis in 1925. He was the scouts' deputy chief from 1930 and chief scout from 1933 until the association closed with the Soviet occupation of Lithuania in 1940.

Alekna did not retreat to the west like many other members of Lithuanian intelligentsia. He continued to work as a doctor in Kaunas. He died on 17 October 1952 and was buried in Petrašiūnai Cemetery.

== Awards ==
Alekna received the following awards:

- Order of the Lithuanian Grand Duke Gediminas (3rd degree)
- Order of the Three Stars (3rd degree)
- Lithuanian Independence Medal
