= Trade and Industry Bank =

Commercial bank in Lithuania (1918–1927)

Coordinates: 54°53′52″N 23°54′26″E

- Native name: Prekybos ir pramonės bankas
- Type: Joint-stock company
- Industry: Banking
- Genre: Commercial bank
- Founded: 19 December 1918
- Founders: Martynas Yčas; Jonas Yčas; Saliamonas Banaitis; Jurgis Alekna
- Defunct: 21 September 1927
- Fate: Bankruptcy
- Headquarters: Laisvės alėja 90, Kaunas, Lithuania
- Number of locations: 23 (1922)
- Area served: Lithuania
- Key people: Martynas Yčas (board chairman); Jurgis Alekna (council chairman); Adomas Prūsas (managing director); Jonas Šodė (managing director)
- Total assets: 11.7 million litas (1923)
- Total equity: 6 million litas (1923)

The Trade and Industry Bank (Lithuanian: Prekybos ir pramonės bankas) was the first bank of the interwar Republic of Lithuania. It was established in 1918 and, by 1922, became the second largest bank in Lithuania, after Ūkio bankas. Due to mismanagement, it went bankrupt in 1927.

The bank was founded in summer 1918 though it was officially approved on 19 December 1918. It was a commercial bank, but it also performed some state treasury functions, including handling government's foreign payments and selling government bonds, while the state treasury was being set up. Until mid-1922, it was half owned by the Ministry of Finance when it sold majority of its shares to Martynas Yčas who became the controlling shareholder. A number of prominent Lithuanian figures, including politicians and artists, owned shares in the bank.

The bank expanded quickly and established 22 branches by 1922. It also invested in the Baltic States Bank in New York and the German–Lithuanian Bank in Berlin. Due to the high post-war inflation, the bank invested in "hard" assets, including land, real estate, and shares of various companies. It financed numerous companies connected to Yčas. Due to realized losses and illiquid assets that had depreciated in value, the bank started experiencing a liquidity crunch in 1923. By mid-1924, the bank was insolvent. After leadership change, the bank continued to function until about 1926. It was officially declared bankrupt in September 1927.

While the bank operated in difficult post-war economic conditions, it was mismanaged. Bank loans were issued hastily without proper guarantees, its assets were overvalued, loans to its officers were made at very favorable rates, money was used for personal purposes, there were accounting irregularities, etc. Eight leaders of the bank were tried for criminal negligence. The court rendered its decision in March 1936 finding Yčas and Jonas Šodė guilty, while others were acquitted. However, jail time was avoided due to the expired statute of limitations.

== Establishment ==
Towards the end of World War I, Lithuanians hurried to organize their own bank. The idea of a Lithuanian bank was investigated already in 1916. At the time, Martynas Yčas and Jonas Žilius-Jonila visited various communities of Lithuanian Americans gaining support for a land bank (a bank that would focus on issuing loans for land purchase). However, upon return to Lithuania, Yčas realized that a bank focused on industrial development would be more beneficial.

In summer 1918, Martynas Yčas, Jonas Yčas, Saliamonas Banaitis, Jurgis Alekna, and others drafted the plans for the Trade and Industry Bank and submitted them to the Council of Lithuania and Ober Ost officials for approval. The bank was founded on 1 May 1918. The bank was officially approved by the government of Prime Minister Augustinas Voldemaras on 19 December 1918. At the time, Martynas Yčas was the minister of finance.

The bank took the premises of the Vilnius branch of the State Bank of the Russian Empire (present-day Lithuanian Academy of Sciences on Gediminas Avenue). At the time, it employed about 25 workers (though only two had banking experience) and 20 armed guards. Its operations were limited to currency exchange, checking accounts, and deposit accounts for securities and other financial papers. After the outbreak of the Lithuanian–Soviet War in December 1918, the bank evacuated to Kaunas, which became the temporary capital of Lithuania, leaving only a branch in Vilnius.

== Operations ==
=== Expansion ===
==== Domestic branches ====
The bank aggressively expanded and established local branches and offices. In 1919, it had branches in Vilnius and Šiauliai. In early 1920, it advertised additional branches in Marijampolė and Panevėžys as well as agency offices in Užventis and Virbalis. By 1922, it had a total of 22 branches – 19 in Lithuania, two (Vilnius and Klaipėda) in disputed territories, and one in Latvia. (Note: The bank published a map of its branches in 1922. The branches were located in Alytus, Anykščiai, Biržai, Joniškis, Kėdainiai, Klaipėda, Kybartai, Liepāja, Linkuva, Marijampolė, Mažeikiai, Panevėžys, Rokiškis, Raseiniai, Šiauliai, Švėkšna, Telšiai, Tauragė, Ukmergė, Utena, Vilkaviškis, and Vilnius. The map also marked Obeliai but it was not included in the list.) Some of their operations were interrupted by the ongoing armed hostilities. For example, the branch in Šiauliai was temporarily closed due to the Lithuanian–Bermontian War while the branch in Vilnius was permanently closed by the Polish administration.

The bank had a branch outside of Lithuania in Liepāja which was used by Lithuanian traders before Lithuania gained the port of Klaipėda as a result of the Klaipėda Revolt in January 1923. When Lithuanian trade shifted to Klaipėda, the branch in Liepāja was closed. In exchange for allowing the Trade and Industry Bank to operate in Latvia, Riga Commercial Bank was allowed to open a branch in Šiauliai which operated until World War II.

==== Foreign banks ====
The bank became a shareholder of the Baltic States Bank organized by the Lithuanian Development Corp. in New York. This bank was not successful and was sold to Italians who renamed it to the Pennsylvania Exchange Bank in 1924. Together with Vulfas Frenkelis, the bank purchased two small banks in Berlin, Markus und Volkamer and Aktien Mantel, and merged them into the new German–Lithuanian Bank (Deutsch-Litauisch Bank für Handel und Industrie). Frenkelis owned one-third of the new bank. This proved to be a particularly poor investment and source of major losses.

The bank also established working relations with foreign banks, including Stockholms Enskilda Bank, Darmstädter Bank in Germany, Lloyds Bank in the United Kingdom, Privatbanken in Denmark, Irving National Bank in New York, Louisiana State Bank. Such relationships quickly numbered several dozen. The bank was particularly interested in money transfers by the Lithuanian emigrants to Lithuania.

=== Investments ===
At the end of 1920, the bank had deposits of almost 20 million Lithuanian auksinas. Due to high post-war inflation, the bank invested in land and real estate, foreign currency, securities. It purchased real estate in Vilnius, Klaipėda, Šiauliai, Kybartai, Rokiškis as well as land and warehouses in Kaunas and Raseiniai. It purchased shares of various Lithuanian companies, primarily related to Martynas Yčas, many of which were not successful. The bank financed these businesses connected to Yčas:

- Liquor, cognac, and wine manufacturing facility for the French company Alphonse Schick
- Breweries Gubernija and Ragutis
- Rectified spirit producer St. Montvilo įpėdinių ir Ko
- Construction companies Butas and Statyba
- Import-export company Dubysa
- Lumber company Eglynas
- Insurance company Lietuvos Lloydas
- Transport company Lithuanian Steamship Corporation (Lietuvos garlaivių bendrovė)
- Oil pressing company Ringuva (it became successful and continues to operate)
- Agricultural machinery company Nemunas
- Agricultural processing company Patrimpas
- Agricultural trading company Anglo-Lithuanian National Company (Anglų lietuvių tautos bendrovė)
- Coal trading company Kuras
- Lime factory near Šiauliai
- Spinning and weaving factory in Panevėžys

In September 1922, the bank purchased 2,500 shares (about 2%) of the Bank of Lithuania valued at 250,000 Lithuanian litas. In early 1923, the bank had lent 2.2 million litas, owned investments of 5.1 million litas, and held foreign currency valued at 4.4 million litas.

The bank was supported by the government. It performed some treasury functions while the state treasury was being set up. It handled government's foreign payments and sold government bonds. The bank was granted export monopoly in linen in 1921 and rights to negotiate trade deals regarding Russian lumber that Lithuania was supposed to receive as war compensation according to the Soviet–Lithuanian Peace Treaty. The bank wanted to become the bank of issue of Lithuanian litas, but it was rejected.

== Bankruptcy ==
=== Financial difficulties ===
In 1922, the bank showed profits of 1.2 million litas and declared 14% dividend. Yčas received 358,988 litas in dividends and 26,274 litas in profit sharing; his wife additionally received 11,200 litas in dividends. However, later corrections to accounting records revealed that the profit was overstated by 3.5 times. Thus, it distributed its capital as dividends, not profits. The bank started experiencing financial difficulties and liquidity crunch in 1923. The bank attempted to sell some of its investments, but they decreased in value due to deflation and there was a lack of interested buyers. In summer 1924, the bank had difficulty returning deposits and had outstanding loans of 9.1 million litas to other banks. The situation was made worse by a bank run.

In summer 1924, government investigation valued the bank's certain losses at 2.9 million litas and probable losses at 1.9 million. The bank was insolvent. The Ministry of Finance stepped in and replaced bank's leadership. The stated capital was cut in half to 3 million litas only to be cut again to 1.4 million litas in 1925. Under finance minister Vytautas Petrulis (former board member of the bank), the Bank of Lithuania lent 2 million litas to the Trade and Industry Bank. Martynas Yčas was also chairman of the council of the Bank of Lithuania in 1922–1925. In 1926, the two banks negotiated restructuring of a loan of 1.5 million litas, but the plan was not approved by the Ministry of Finance. It appears that the bank ceased financial operations in 1927. On 21 September 1927, a shareholder meeting declared the bank bankrupt since it incurred 5 million litas of losses. However, it appears that the bank had sufficient cash to return customer deposits. On 19 March 1928, Kaunas District Court approved the insolvency.

=== Trials ===
Jurgis Alekna, Jonas Dobkevičius, Martynas Yčas, Adomas Prūsas, Jonas Šodė, Juozas Grigonis, Vincas Zakarevičius, and Otto Kelertas (chief accountant) were tried for criminal negligence and causing 2.3 million of losses. After long delays, Kaunas District Court reached the final decision in March 1936. The court determined that the bank caused losses of 1.9 million to the Bank of Lithuania and 0.3 million litas to the government. Yčas (chairman of the board) and Šodė (chairman of the council) were found guilty. The court found that Yčas extended loans eagerly without obtaining proper collateral, while Šodė did not keep proper accounting records and approved investment purchases at inflated prices. However, they were not sentenced due to the expired statute of limitations. Dobkevičius was also found guilty but he died in 1934. Others were acquitted.

At the same time, the district court dismissed the civilian suit seeking financial damages. This decision was appealed both by the defendants and the prosecutor. In October 1936, the appeals court upheld the criminal convictions against Yčas, Šodė, and Dobkevičius and additionally found Prūsas guilty. The appeals court reversed the decision on civilian damages and imposed damages on Yčas, Šodė, and Dobkevičius: 36,107 litas with 6% interest for the Ministry of Communications, 774 litas for the Ministry of Finance, and 1,526,806 litas for the Bank of Lithuania. The Supreme Tribunal of Lithuania upheld the conviction and the damages. Various real and personal property of Yčas was sold in various auctions though he attempted to keep some property by transferring it to his wife's name.

Separately, the former minister of finance Vytautas Petrulis was tried on several counts of corruption by the Supreme Tribunal of Lithuania in May 1932. Among other charges, he was suspected of corruption when approving the 2 million litas loan to the Trade and Industry Bank in August 1925. However, the court did not find enough evidence for this charge (Petrulis was found guilty on other counts and sentenced to two years in prison).

Jonas Šliūpas (father-in-law of Yčas) had guaranteed 25,000 litas loan taken by the Trade and Industry Bank in October 1924. He was sued by the Bank of Lithuania to enforce the guarantee. The Lithuanian Tribunal ordered Šliūpas to pay the loan, 6% annual interest, and court costs in 1933. Unable to pay, he appealed to President Antanas Smetona. Eventually, the Bank of Lithuania seized his printing shop Titnagas to cover the debts.

=== Causes of failure ===
According to a November 1924 article in Rytas newspaper, bank's ownership of the German–Lithuanian Bank caused losses of $180,000 (equivalent to $3,380,000 in 2025). The losses were blamed on the hyperinflation in the Weimar Republic, unsuccessful currency speculation, and bankruptcies of borrowers. The district court determined the losses to be 1.6 million litas, but matters related to the German–Lithuanian Bank were so mystifying and convoluted that the court could not establish its ultimate fate.

In his memoirs, Adomas Prūsas wrote that the bank failed due to the hyperinflation of the German mark, botched transition to the Lithuanian litas, quarrels between shareholders and officers, competition with other banks, and cessation of government's support. The inflation and overall difficult post-war economic situation led to bankruptcies of various borrowers and investees which devalued bank's assets. The bank had poor leadership. Bank loans were issued hastily without proper guarantees, assets were overvalued, loans to officers were made at very favorable rates (e.g. loans were for unlimited term, not secured by collateral, at much lower interest rates), money was used for personal purposes, there were clear conflicts of interest and accounting irregularities, etc. According to an article in Lietuvos žinios, Yčas personally borrowed 17 million German marks and returned just one Lithuanian centas.

== Ownership ==
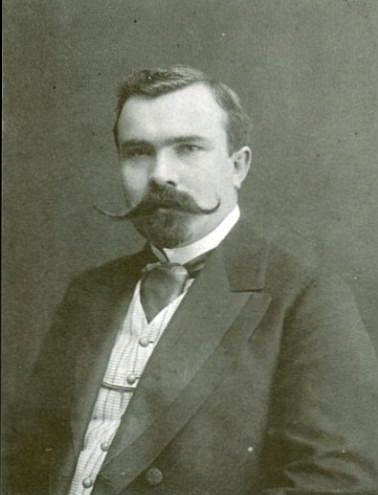
Martynas Yčas, controlling shareholder since 1922

The first series of 5,000 shares with par value of 400 Lithuanian auksinas. Additional 2,500 shares were issued in 1921 and 22,500 shares in 1922, bringing the stated capital to 12 million auksinas which made it the second largest bank in Lithuania after Ūkio bankas. Shares in 1922 were first sold to the existing shareholders; they could buy 3 new shares for each share owned at the nominal price. The other shares were sold at market value. After the introduction of Lithuanian litas, the stated capital was converted at an inflated 2-to-1 ratio to 6 million litas. The more realistic computation put the capital at 1.2 million.

Initially, 50% of the shares were owned by the Ministry of Finance. However, in 1922, the ministry retained only 100 shares and sold 3,650 shares to Martynas Yčas. The government later repurchased 300 shares. This was controversial as the ministry was accused of selling the shares at below market rate (shares were valued at 1,500 to 1,800 auksinas while Yčas paid 800). The issue was investigated by the Constituent Assembly of Lithuania which concluded that there were irregularities and that the government lost money. This was one of the reasons for the resignation of the finance minister Jonas Dobkevičius in August 1922. At the same time, the bank amended its shareholder agreement which gave each share an equal vote. Previously, each shareholder who owned at least 10 shares had one vote. This made Yčas the controlling shareholder of the bank.

According to press reports from July 1919, the Lithuanian Development Corp. (Lietuvos atstatymo bendrovė) organized by Lithuanian Americans in New York, invested 1 million auksinas and promised to distribute additional shares worth 2 million in the United States, but that is questionable information as at the time the bank had authorized shares of only 2 million auksinas. Reportedly, the Lithuanian Development Corp. was ready to invest up to 7 million auksinas into the bank.

A number of prominent figures in the politics and culture of the Republic of Lithuania considered it a matter of patriotism to invest and support their country's first bank. All shares were registered shares. Jonas Šliūpas (father-in-law of Yčas) invested $8,000 (equivalent to $148,600 in 2025) in his, his wife's, and his daughter's names. A shareholder list from 1922 had 203 names, including politicians Antanas Smetona, Augustinas Voldemaras, Vaclovas Sidzikauskas, linguists Jonas Jablonskis and Juozas Balčikonis, artists Kipras Petrauskas, Stasys Šimkus, Antanas Žmuidzinavičius, Antanas Sodeika, priests Maironis, Konstantinas Olšauskas, Kazimieras Šaulys, Kazimieras Paltarokas, Justinas Staugaitis.

== Leadership ==
The first shareholder meeting was organized on 12 December 1919, more than a year after the start of operations. The meeting elected bank's board (chairman Martynas Yčas, members Adomas Prūsas and Vytautas Petrulis), six-member council (chairman Jurgis Alekna, members Saliamonas Banaitis, Jonas Yčas, Konstantinas Olšauskas, Jokūbas Šernas, Andrius Vosylius), and three-member revision committee (Vilius Gaigalaitis, Antanas Macijauskas, M. Malinauskas).

In 1922, Petrulis became Minister of Finance while Prūsas and Vosylius joined the Bank of Lithuania. Therefore, the board was expanded to six members, which included Jonas Dobkevičius (former Minister of Finance), Jokūbas Šernas, Juozas Grigonis, Jonas Šodė, Juozas Grigonis, Vincas Zakarevičius, J. Šėmas, and S. Žirickis. In the council, Šernas and Vosylius were replaced by Konstantinas Šakenis and Jonas Šliūpas.

Bank's managing directors were Adomas Prūsas and Jonas Šodė. Bank's revision commission (i.e. audit committee) was chaired by Juozas Tūbelis and Augustinas Voldemaras.

As bank experienced financial difficulties, its leadership changed in September 1924. Yčas, Šodė, Šernas, and Dobkevičius resigned from the board and were replaced by bankers I. Jazdauskas, Kazimieras Čepas, and J. Bielenkis. The new council included Yčas, Alekna, Jonas Vileišis, Aleksandras Žilinskas, V. Komaras, and J. Volpė. J. Volpė was a controversial figure – reportedly, he was searched by London police and was involved in the German–Lithuanian Bank.

== See also ==
- List of banks in Lithuania

== Bibliography ==
- Grigaravičius, Algirdas (2021). Jonas Smilgevičius – kitoks signataras (in Lithuanian). Voruta. ISBN 978-609-8102-23-9.
- Blažytė, Danutė (1997). "Vytautas Petrulis". In Speciūnas, Vytautas (ed.). Lietuvos Respublikos ministrai pirmininkai (1918–1940) (in Lithuanian). Vilnius: Alma littera. ISBN 9986-02-379-3.
- Laurinavičius, Vidmantas (2003). Bankai Lietuvoje XIX a. pabaiga – XX a. I pusė: projektuose, fotografijose, atvirukuose (PDF) (in Lithuanian). Lietuvos bankas. ISBN 978-609-8204-20-9.
- "Vytauto Petrulio apkaltinimo motyvai". Lietuvos žinios (in Lithuanian). Vol. 129, no. 3921. 9 June 1932.
- Michelsonas, Stasius (1961). Lietuvių išeivija Amerikoje (1868–1961) (in Lithuanian). South Boston, MA: Keleivis. OCLC 1006825.
- Nekrašius, Jonas (2011). "Dr. Jonas Šliūpas ir "Titnago" spaustuvė Šiauliuose" (PDF). Acta humanitarica universitatis Saulensis (in Lithuanian). 12: 259–275. ISSN 1822-7309.
- Perrin, Charles C. (Summer 2013). Lithuanians in the Shadow of Three Eagles: Vincas Kudirka, Martynas Jankus, Jonas Šliūpas and the Making of Modern Lithuania (PDF) (PhD Thesis). Georgia State University.
- Skirius, Juozas (2 April 2024) [2018]. "Martynas Yčas". Visuotinė lietuvių enciklopedija (in Lithuanian). Mokslo ir enciklopedijų leidybos centras.
- Spaičienė, Jurgita (2006). "Paprastojo ir piktybinio bankroto teisinis reguliavimas Lietuvos Respublikoje 1918-1940 metais". Jurisprudencija. 11 (89): 83–88. ISSN 2029-2058.
- Surblys, Alvydas (2006). "Martyno Yčo ekonominės veiklos Kaune pėdsakais". Kauno istorijos metraštis (in Lithuanian). 7: 111–136. ISSN 2335-8734.
- Terleckas, Vladas (1997). Lietuvos bankas 1922–1943 metais: kūrimo ir veiklos studija (PDF) (in Lithuanian). Vilnius: Lietuvos bankas. ISBN 978-609-8204-04-9.
- Terleckas, Vladas (1999). "Pirmasis nacionalinis komercinis bankas" (PDF). Pinigų studijos (in Lithuanian). 1: 56–62.
- Terleckas, Vladas (2000). Lietuvos bankininkystės istorija 1918-1941 (in Lithuanian). Lietuvos banko Leidybos ir poligrafijos skyrius. ISBN 9986-651-26-3.
- Vaitekūnas, Stasys (2011). Justinas Staugaitis: vyskupas, politikas, tautos dvasios ir valstybės puoselėtojas (in Lithuanian). Vilnius: Mokslo ir enciklopedijų leidybos centras. ISBN 9785420016923.
- X. (18 November 1924). "Lietuvos Prekybos ir Pramonės Bankas". Rytas (in Lithuanian). Vol. 261, no. 272. p. 3. The unsigned article with bank's balance sheet as of November 1924 was reprinted in "Iš mūsų finansinių įmonių gyvenimo. Lietuvos Prekybos ir Pramonės Bankas". Lietuva (in Lithuanian). Vol. 262, no. 1764. 19 November 1924. pp. 4–5.
- Yčas, Martynas (2009). Iš Agaro krašto: 1885–1941 (PDF) (in Lithuanian). Kaunas: Candela. ISBN 978-9986-400-21-9.
