= Lithuanian Evangelical Reformed Church =

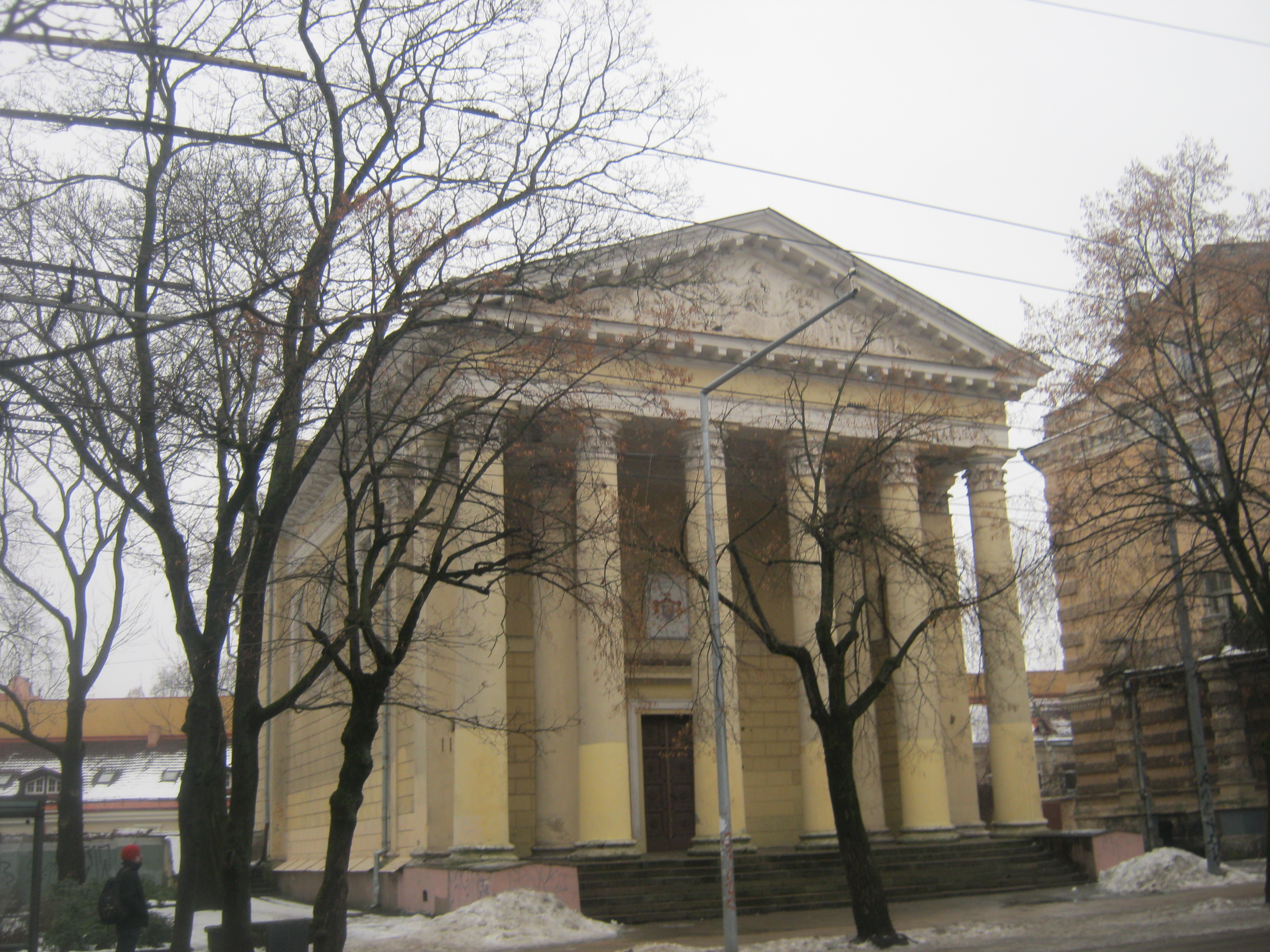
Evangelical Reformed Church in Lithuania's capital Vilnius

The Lithuanian Evangelical Reformed Church (Lithuanian: Lietuvos evangelikų reformatų bažnyčia; Latin: Unitas Lithuaniae; Polish: Jednota Litewska) is a Calvinist denomination in Lithuania which uses a presbyterian polity.

== History ==
The church was founded on December 14, 1557, during the Synod of Vilnius. The General Synod met annually in Lithuania from that date. Started with 2 and later grew to 6 district Synods. The church's Latin name is the Unitas Lithuaniae shortly UL. It sent its representatives to the Polish-Lithuanian Commonwealth. However, the UL was an independent denomination. The parish network covered all parts of the Grand Duchy of Lithuania. The first superintendent was Szymon Zacjusz. In 1565, the anti-trinitarian Lithuanian Brotherhood separated from the Calvinist church.

In 1695, Samuelis Bitneris by the order of the Vilnius Synod began translating the New Testament into the Lithuanian language and completed the majority of this task. Bitneris was assisted by Jonas Božimovskis, while the translation for Lithuania Minor was adapted by P. Z. Šusteris. This translation from the Greek language was prepared according to a Lithuanian dialect of Kėdainiai and in 1701 was published in Königsberg with a title Naujas Testamentas Wieszpaties musu Jezaus Kristaus.

Parishes were in Vilnius, Biržai, Švobiškis (Pasvalys District Municipality), Nemunėlio Radviliškis, Salamiestis, Kėdainiai, Slutsk, Dzyarzhynsk (Koydanava), Zabłudów and later in Izabelin (Belarusian: Ізабэлін). Before World War II, the church had 10,000 believers; in 2012 it had approximately 7,000 in 14 congregations. In 1922 the denomination become a member of the World Communion of Reformed Churches.

== Theology ==
The church adheres to the Sandomierz Confession of 1570, Second Helvetic Confession of 1562 and the Heidelberg Catechism of 1563. These are in Lithuanian and Polish languages. The Sandomierz Confession was based on the Second Helvetic Confession adopted by the Polish-Lithuanian General Synod and was approved later by the Evangelical Reformed Church of Lithuania. The Great Gdansk Agenda (1637) is a liturgical book approved and adopted by the Unitas Lithuaniae.

== International organisations ==
The church is a member of the World Communion of Reformed Churches and has fraternal relationships with the Reformed Church in Hungary, the Church of Lippe. Denominational member of the World Reformed Fellowship.

== Churches ==
In Lithuania, churches can be found in Biržai, Vilnius, Papilys, Kaunas, Nemunėlio Radviliškis, Švobiškis, Šiauliai, Panevėžys, Kėdainiai, Salamiestis, Kelmė.

== See also ==
Religion in Lithuania
