= Scout Association of Lithuania =

Lietuvos skautų sąjunga
- Scout Association of Lithuania
- Headquarters: Vilnius
- Country: Lithuania
- Founded: 1930/1988
- Membership: 1,300
- Website skautas.lt

Lietuvos skautų sąjunga (LSS, Scout Association of Lithuania) is the oldest of Lithuania's Scouting organizations. The organization serves about 1,300 members as of 2008.

== History ==
LSS is the oldest Scouting organization in Lithuania. Its predecessor was established in 1930, although there are some opinions that it happened much earlier, in 1918, but that was only the embryo phase.

In 1918, Petras Jurgėlas-Jurgelevicius established the first Scout troop in Lithuania. In 1922, the first general assembly united the Lithuanian Scout Movement into the first Scout Association of Lithuania (SAL). This date could be argued as the year of establishment of Scout Association of Lithuania, for in 1930 when the law of Lithuanian Scouting Association (LSA) became effective all other organizations were united under the new name.

After Soviet Union occupied Lithuania, the Scout Association of Lithuania was suspended, but rehabilitated in 1988 in Vilnius.

== Ideals ==
Lithuania Scout Association is unpolitical, non-profit making freewill driven youth organization.

== Scout law ==
- A Scout is straight forward and keeps their word.
- A Scout is faithful to God and Motherland.
- A Scout is useful and helps neighbors.
- A Scout is a friend to neighbors and is a brother or sister to other Scouts.
- A Scout is polite.
- A Scout is a friend of nature.
- A Scout obeys parents and the authorities.
- A Scout is lively, does not lose both self-control and hope.
- A Scout is thrifty.
- A Scout is sober and chaste in mind, words and actions.

== Scout motto ==
The Scout Motto is Budėk, translating as Be Prepared in Lithuanian. The Lithuanian noun for a single Scout is Skautas.
