= Rozalimas =

- Town
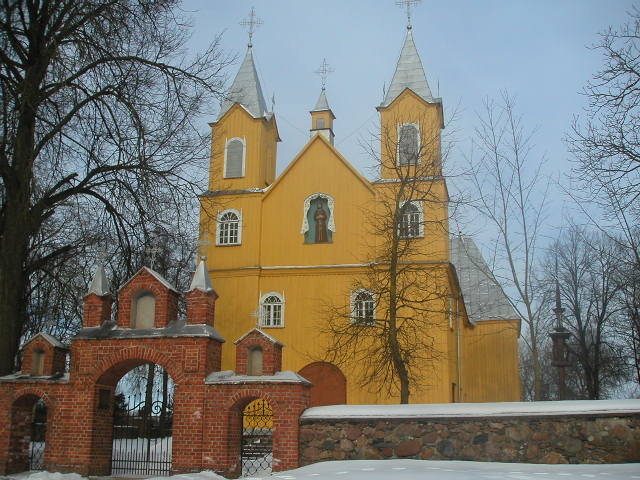

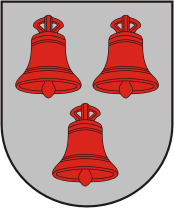
- Coat of arms

- Location in Lithuania
- Coordinates: 55°53′30″N 23°53′0″E
- Country: Lithuania
- Ethnographic region: Samogitia
- County: Šiauliai County

Population (2011)
  - Total: 746
- Time zone: UTC+2 (EET)
  - Summer (DST): UTC+3 (EEST)

Rozalimas is a small town in Šiauliai County in northern-central Lithuania. As of 2011 it had a population of 746. Rozalimas is a state-protected urbanistic monument with unique Lithuanian wooden architecture. River Daugyvenė flows by Rozalimas.

== History ==
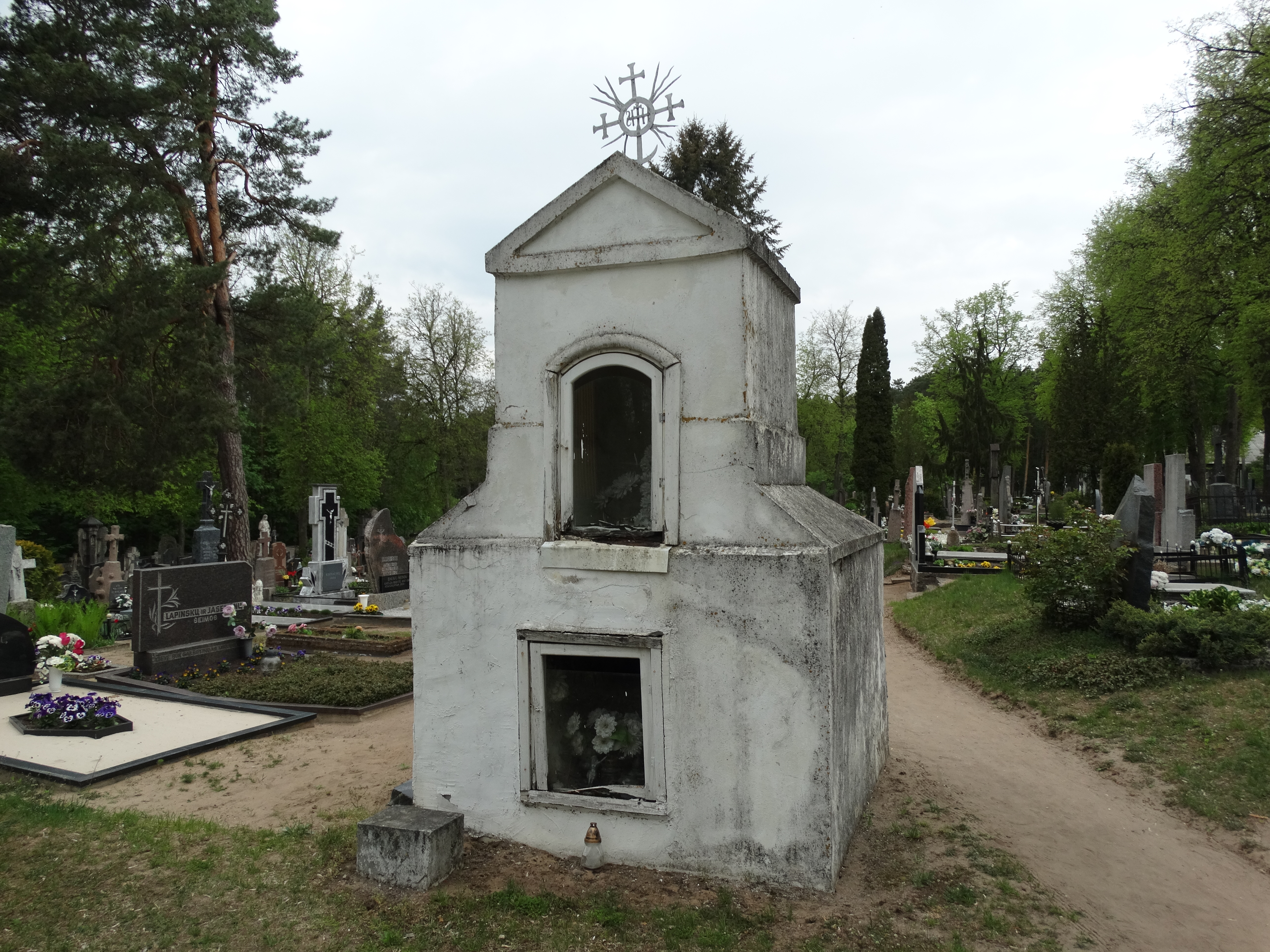
A shrine in Rozalimas

Rozalimas grew from the Padubysys manor and village, first mentioned in 17th century. Rozalimas first mentioned in 1767 in the church metrics book. Presumably in this year the wooden church of St. Virgin Mary was built and the parish established. Rozalimas grew quit fast in the middle of 19th century. In 1868 there were 299 inhabitants in Rozalimas, 2 stores, 2 inns, vinery, police station. During the WWI almost half of Rozalimas was burned to ground.

Since 19th century Lithuanian book carriers Jurgis Bielinis, P. Bakčiūnas distributed forbidden Lithuanian press.

In 1930 Rozalimas suffered from a big fire.

The village had a Jewish community before the Holocaust in Lithuania. After the German invasion of Lithuania in June 1941, they were murdered near Panevežys.

During the first years of Soviet occupation Lithuanian partisans were active in Rozalimas. On 8 August 1945, Rozalimas was taken by Lithuanian partisans from Žalioji rinktinė (Green detachment) belonging to Algimantas military district.

== Famous people ==
- Sculptor Jonas Danauskas (1861–1937). Rozalimas and church of Rozalimas decorated with his sculptures.
- Lithuanian colonel Jonas Petruitis (1891–1943). Participant of Lithuanian Wars of Independence, survived a Chervyen massacre and wrote a book about it - Kaip jie mus sušaudė (How they shoot us).
