= Adomas Prūsas =

Lithuanian banker (1878–1939)

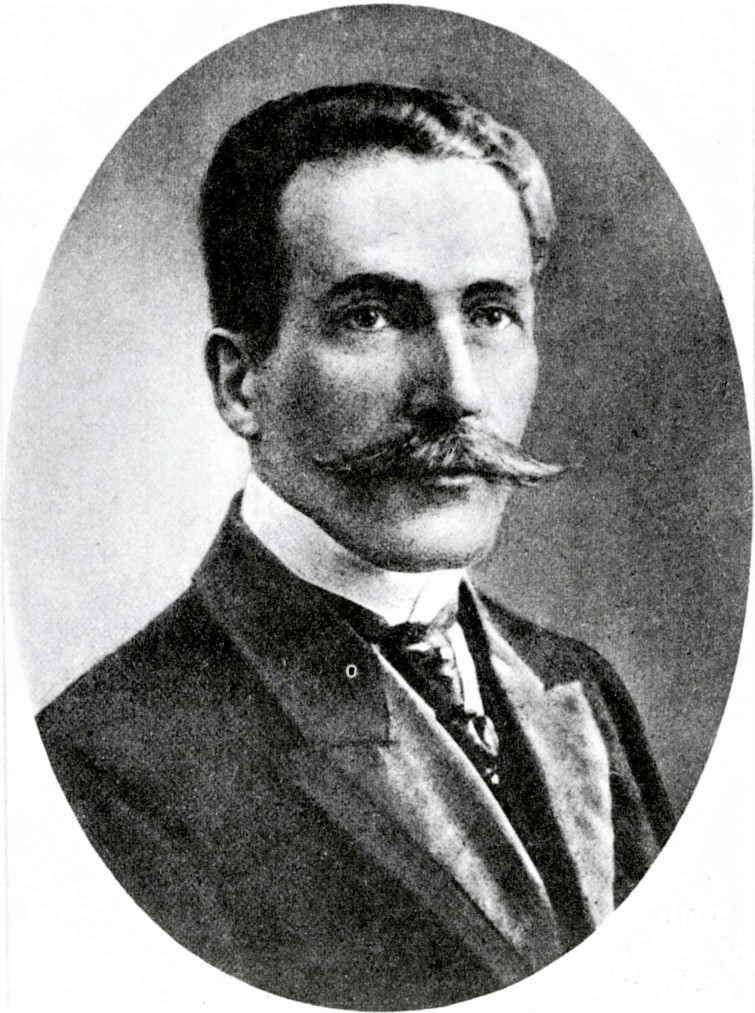
- Adomas Prūsas c. 1921
- Born: 23 November 1878; Grikiapeliai, Kovno Governorate, Russian Empire
- Died: 6 April 1939 (aged 60); Kaunas, Lithuania
- Occupation: Banker
- Employers: Ministry of Finance of the Russian Empire; Trade and Industry Bank; Bank of Lithuania
- Political party: Party of National Progress; Lithuanian Nationalist Union
- Spouse: Emilija Dzenytė-Grietinia-Prūsienė
- Children: Algirdas Prūsas

Adomas Prūsas (23 November 1878 – 6 April 1939) was a Lithuanian banker. He was one of the founders and the first managing director of the Trade and Industry Bank, the first Lithuanian commercial bank. He was the deputy governor of the Bank of Lithuania from 1922 to 1926.

Born to a family of poor farmers, Prūsas obtained only primary education (he later passed gymnasium graduation exams). In 1894, he moved to Saint Petersburg searching for a better job. In 1903, he obtained a job at the local branch of the Moscow Society of Agriculture and its Committee on Savings and Loan and Industrial Partnerships. Later he also joined the Ministry of Finance of the Russian Empire. In these roles, Prūsas dealt with credit unions and land banks for about 15 years. After the October Revolution, he refused to join the People's Commissariat for Finance and returned to Lithuania.

In Vilnius, he worked on organizing the Trade and Industry Bank and became its first managing director. The bank financed various Lithuanian companies, many of which were connected to Martynas Yčas and Prūsas. In 1922, Prūsas moved to the newly established Bank of Lithuania where he became deputy of Vladas Jurgutis. He helped introduce the Lithuanian litas, the national currency of Lithuania. Due to mismanagement, the Trade and Industry Bank became insolvent in 1924 and officially bankrupt in 1927. For his role in the bank, Prūsas was demoted to the director of the Marijampolė branch of the Bank of Lithuania in October 1926. He was tried for criminal negligence. The case was concluded by a district court only in March 1936. Initially, he was acquitted but found guilty on appeal. Jail time was avoided due to the expired statute of limitations.

== Biography ==
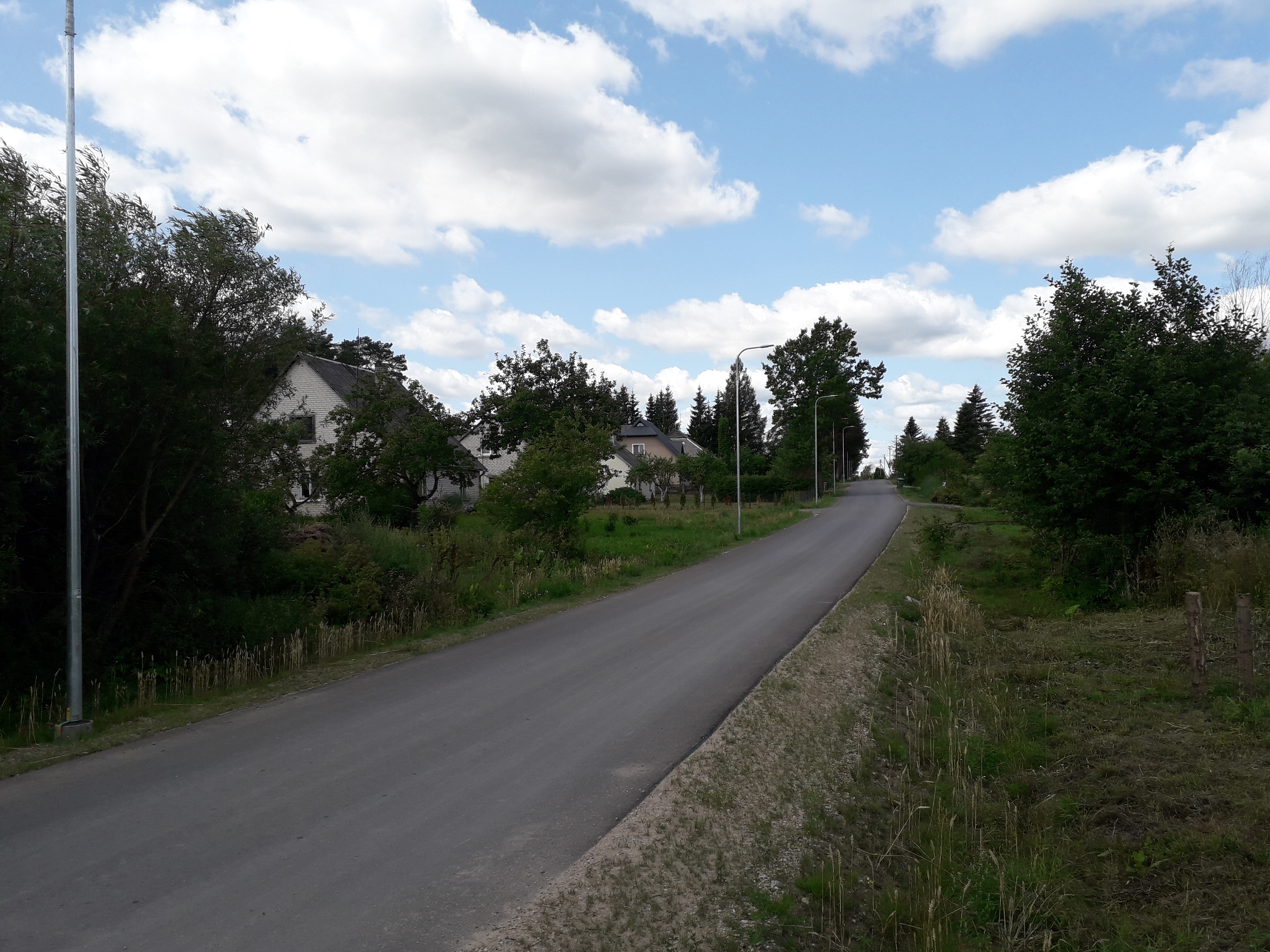
Grikiapeliai in Lithuania, the birthplace of Adomas Prūsas

=== Early life ===
Adomas Prūsas was born on 23 November 1878 to poor farmers Elijas Prūsas and Apolonija Prūsienė in the village of Grikiapeliai, then part of the Kovno Governorate, Russian Empire. The word "prūsas" means Prussian, therefore it is thought that the Prūsai family were refugees from East Prussia. Prūsas was the penultimate son of a family of six children, growing up with two other brothers and three sisters. Prūsas's mother was described as very religious, while his father as diligent and crafty.

Lietuvių enciklopedija published in Boston claims that Prūsas was educated at a secret Lithuanian school in Grikiapeliai (such secret village schools were common during the Lithuanian press ban). However, Prūsas did not mention such school in his memoirs. In 1890, at the age of twelve, Prūsas began attending a Russian primary school in Svėdasai, which he graduated in 1893. Prūsas's parents could not afford to send him to a gymnasium. His older brother helped him find employment at the administration of Aluotas volost. However, his wage was very low, and Prūsas decided to search for a better job in Saint Petersburg in 1894.

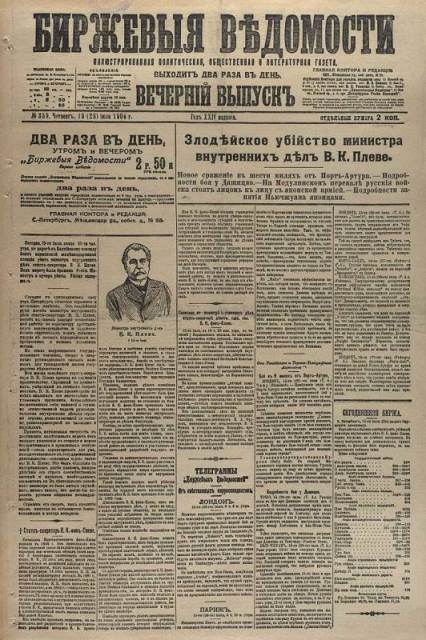
The newspaper Birzhevyie Vedomosti where Prūsas worked in 1895–1898

In Saint Petersburg, Prūsas found employment in the dispatch office of Rodina magazine, where he did simple administrative work like making lists of subscribers. After about a year, Prūsas became employed by the daily newspaper Birzhevyie Vedomosti which paid double his previous salary. The job needed accounting skills so he completed a 6-month bookkeeping course. Due to frail health, Prūsas left Saint Petersburg and obtained a job as steward's assistant and bookkeeper on an estate belonging to a local noble near Hrodna. He worked there from 1898 to 1903.

=== Banking experience in Russia ===
In 1903, Prūsas returned to Saint Petersburg and began working at the local branch of the Moscow Society of Agriculture and its Committee on Savings and Loan and Industrial Partnerships (Комитет о ссудо-сберегательных и промышленных товариществах) which deal with cooperatives. For about 15 years, Prūsas worked on matters related to land banks, including preparing statistical bulletins. In 1908, he also started working in the credit office of the Ministry of Finance. He checked financial reports of Russian banks and was promoted to an accountant – the highest rank for a person of non-noble birth. In 1905, he passed sixth grade exams (equivalent to gymnasium graduation exams) and completed bookkeeping courses. In 1926, he published a study on banks and lending before 1915 based on materials accumulated in Saint Petersburg.

Prūsas used his professional experience to advocate for credit unions in Lithuania and drafting plans for the Lithuanian Land Bank (it was not established). In 1913, together with Andrius Domaševičius, Jonas Smilgevičius, and Alfonsas Moravskis, he drafted articles of incorporation for a credit union in Vilnius. In 1913, he presented a paper on credit institutions to the Lithuanian Scientific Society. Prūsas also joined the Lithuanian cultural life in Saint Petersburg. For three years, he was chairman of the Lithuanian Mutual Aid Society for the Poor of Saint Petersburg (known as Mažturčiai). He was also one of the co-founders of the Party of National Progress. He contributed articles to Lithuanian periodicals, including Vilniaus žinios, Viltis, Lietuvos žinios, Vairas.

After the October Revolution, Prūsas and other finance ministry workers participated in strikes against the Bolsheviks. Those who protested received wages from a special fund. According to Prūsas, after the funds were depleted, the opposition to the Bolsheviks ended. The most active members of the resistance faced Bolshevik repressions, including arrests and interrogation by Felix Dzerzhinsky. Prūsas was offered a high-ranking post in the People's Commissariat for Finance, but he refused and decided to return to Lithuania.

=== Trade ad Industry Bank ===
In 1918, along with other Lithuanian intellectuals such as Kipras Petrauskas, Stasys Šilingas and Justinas Zubrickas, Prūsas reached Vilnius after a month-long journey. In July 1918, he was coopted to the budget commission of the Council of Lithuania. The Trade and Industry Bank, the first commercial bank of Lithuania, was founded in summer 1918 by several Lithuanian activists, including Martynas Yčas, Jonas Yčas, Saliamonas Banaitis, and Jurgis Alekna. However, Prūsas, banker Česlovas Landsbergis, and lawyer Juozas Landsbergis were the only people with prior banking experience. As a result, Prūsas became the managing director of the bank. Prūsas left the bank in 1922 to join the Bank of Lithuania.

Until mid-1922, the bank was half owned by the Lithuanian Ministry of Finance. It was a commercial bank, but it also performed some state treasury functions, including handling government's foreign payments and selling government bonds. Due to the high post-war inflation, the bank invested in "hard" assets, including land, real estate, and shares of various companies, many of which were connected to Yčas and Prūsas. Prūsas was founder, board member, or shareholder of several companies financed by the bank, including brewery Ragutis, coal trading company Kuras, construction company Butas, lumber company Eglynas, insurance company Lietuvos Loidas, agricultural machinery company Nemunas.

Due to mismanagement, the bank became insolvent in 1924 and was officially declared bankrupt in 1927. Eight leaders, including Prūsas, were tried for criminal negligence. In March 1936, Kaunas District Court acquitted Prūsas. However, appeals court found him guilty, but jail time was avoided due to the expired statute of limitations. At the time of his death, Prūsas owed more than 110,000 Lithuanian litas to the Bank of Lithuania.

=== Bank of Lithuania ===
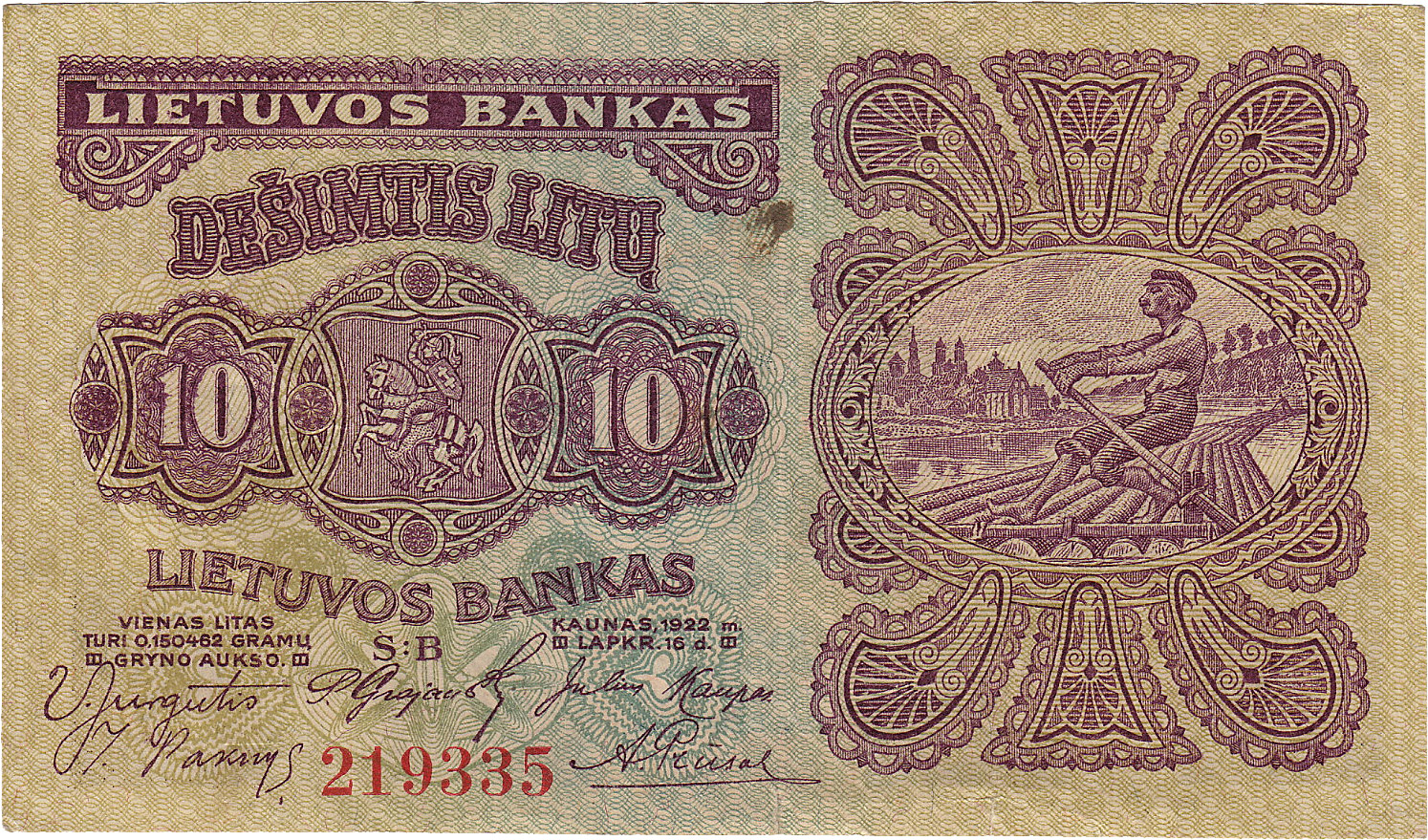
10 litai banknote (1922) with signature of Prūsas

In 1919, Prūsas was offered to lead the State Control Department, and later the Ministry of Finance. As a member of the Party of National Progress, Prūsas unsuccessfully ran in the April 1920 election to the Constituent Assembly of Lithuania.

In late September 1922, Prūsas was appointed deputy of Vladas Jurgutis, governor of the Bank of Lithuania who was an educated economist but without banking experience. Prūsas was reluctant to join and the government even considered drafting him to the Lithuanian Army so that he could be ordered to work at the bank. Prūsas worked on establishing a bank of issue and introducing the Lithuanian litas in October 1922. In 1923–1924, we was a member of the bank's Central Discount Committee, which made decisions on granting loans and guarantees. Generally, the bank leaned towards a conservative and restrictive monetary police; Prūsas spoke in favor of its liberalization.

Prūsas served as deputy governor for one term. In his memoirs, he blamed his membership in the Lithuanian Nationalist Union for not being selected for the second term. However, more likely, it was his prior involvement with the now-insolvent Trade and Industry Bank.

=== Later years ===
Prūsas was appointed the director of the Marijampolė branch of the Bank of Lithuania in October 1926. In his memoirs, he remarked that it was akin to exile. He considered himself too experienced for such a small office. In 1936, a complaint was submitted to the headquarters of the bank claiming that Prūsas unilaterally granted or extended loans and blaming his poor leadership for the losses incurred by the branch. The headquarters did not react to the complaint.

Prūsas continued to be involved in public life. He was elected chairman of the Marijampolė branch of the Lithuanian Nationalist Union. In 1932, he was elected to the Marijampolė city council and served until his death. He was an honorary member of Fraternitas Baltiensis, a student organization. Prūsas contributed articles to Lietuvos aidas, Savivaldybė, Tautos ūkis. He published his memoirs in 1938 (republished in 2014).

Adomas Prūsas died on 6 April 1939 in Kaunas.

== Personal life ==
Prūsas was married to the Latvian writer Emilija Dzenytė-Grietinia-Prūsienė. She is best known for her Lithuanian novel The Priest Kairys (Kunigas Kairys) which dealt with the Lithuanian National Revival. It was published in 1933 and staged as a play in 1936. They had one son named Algirdas.

Prūsas was friends with Jonas Basanavičius and they would visit Prūsas's birthplace.

== Bibliography ==
- Grigaravičius, Algirdas (2021). Jonas Smilgevičius – kitoks signataras (in Lithuanian). Voruta. ISBN 978-609-8102-23-9.
- Surblys, Alvydas (2006). "Martyno Yčo ekonominės veiklos Kaune pėdsakais". Kauno istorijos metraštis (in Lithuanian). 7: 111–136. ISSN 2335-8734.
- Terleckas, Vladas (1997). Lietuvos bankas 1922–1943 metais: kūrimo ir veiklos studija (PDF) (in Lithuanian). Vilnius: Lietuvos bankas. ISBN 978-609-8204-04-9.
- Terleckas, Vladas (2000). Lietuvos bankininkystės istorija 1918-1941 (in Lithuanian). Lietuvos banko Leidybos ir poligrafijos skyrius. ISBN 9986-651-26-3.
- Terleckas, Vladas (2001). Lietuvos bankininkai: gyvenimų ir darbų pėdsakai (in Lithuanian). Vilnius: Lietuvos bankas. ISBN 9986651271.
- Yčas, Martynas (2009). Iš Agaro krašto: 1885–1941 (PDF) (in Lithuanian). Kaunas: Candela. ISBN 978-9986-400-21-9.
