= Papilys =

- Town
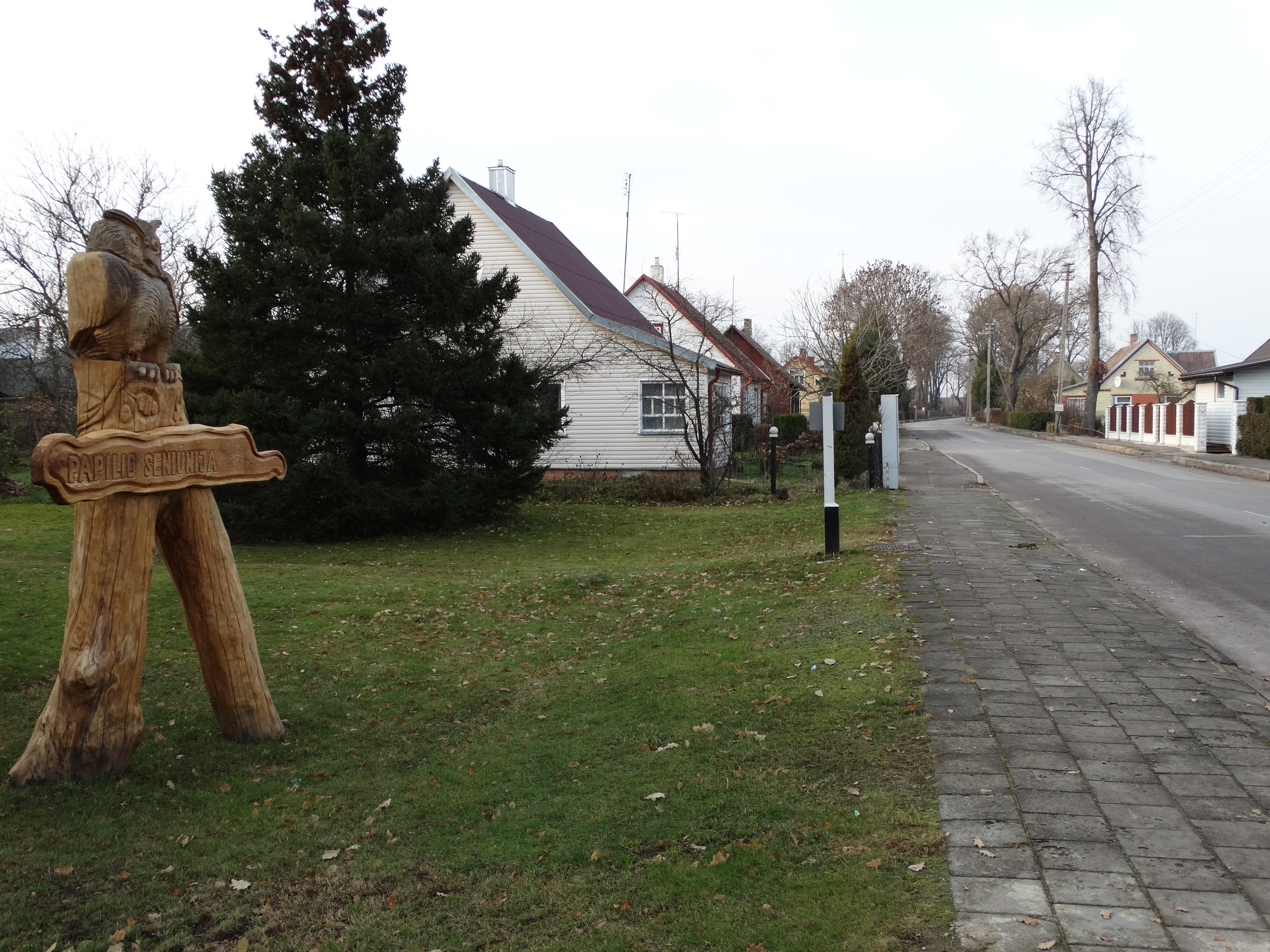

- Location within Lithuania
- Coordinates: 56°07′00″N 25°00′30″E
- Country: Lithuania
- County: Panevėžys County

Area
  - Total: 1.402 km^{2} (0.541 sq mi)
- Elevation: 64 m (210 ft)

Population (2021)
  - Total: 309
- Time zone: UTC+2 (EET)
  - Summer (DST): UTC+3 (EEST)

Papilys is a small town in Panevėžys County, in northeastern Lithuania. According to the 2011 census, the town has a population of 236 people. In the 2021 census, the town's population went up to 309.
