= Nemunėlio Radviliškis =

- Town
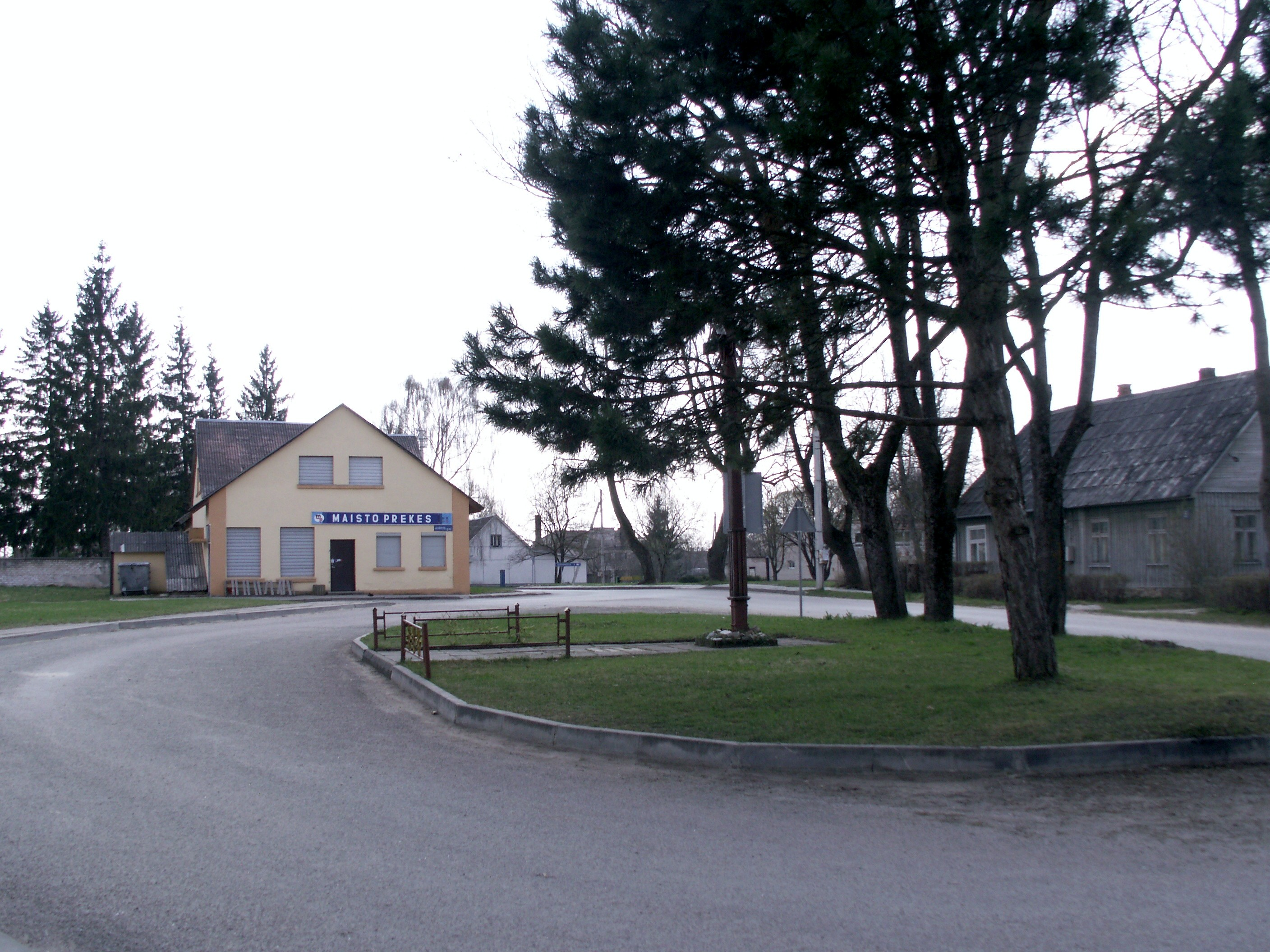

- Flag Coat of arms

- Location in Lithuania
- Coordinates: 56°23′50″N 24°46′20″E
- Country: Lithuania
- County: Panevėžys County
- Municipality: Biržai district municipality
- Eldership: Nemunėlio Radviliškis eldership
- Capital of: Nemunėlio Radviliškis eldership

Population (2011)
  - Total: 566
- Time zone: UTC+2 (EET)
  - Summer (DST): UTC+3 (EEST)

Nemunėlio Radviliškis is a town in Biržai district municipality, in Panevėžys County, northern Lithuania. According to the 2011 census, the town has a population of 566 people.

== Etymology ==
The name Radviliškis is a place name derived from the last name Radvila. The town was founded in the 16th century by the Dukes of Biržai and Dubingiai, the Radvila family, and is thus named after them. To distinguish it from the town of Radviliškis, the town was given the designation Nemunėlis, thus referring to the river flowing through the town.

== History ==
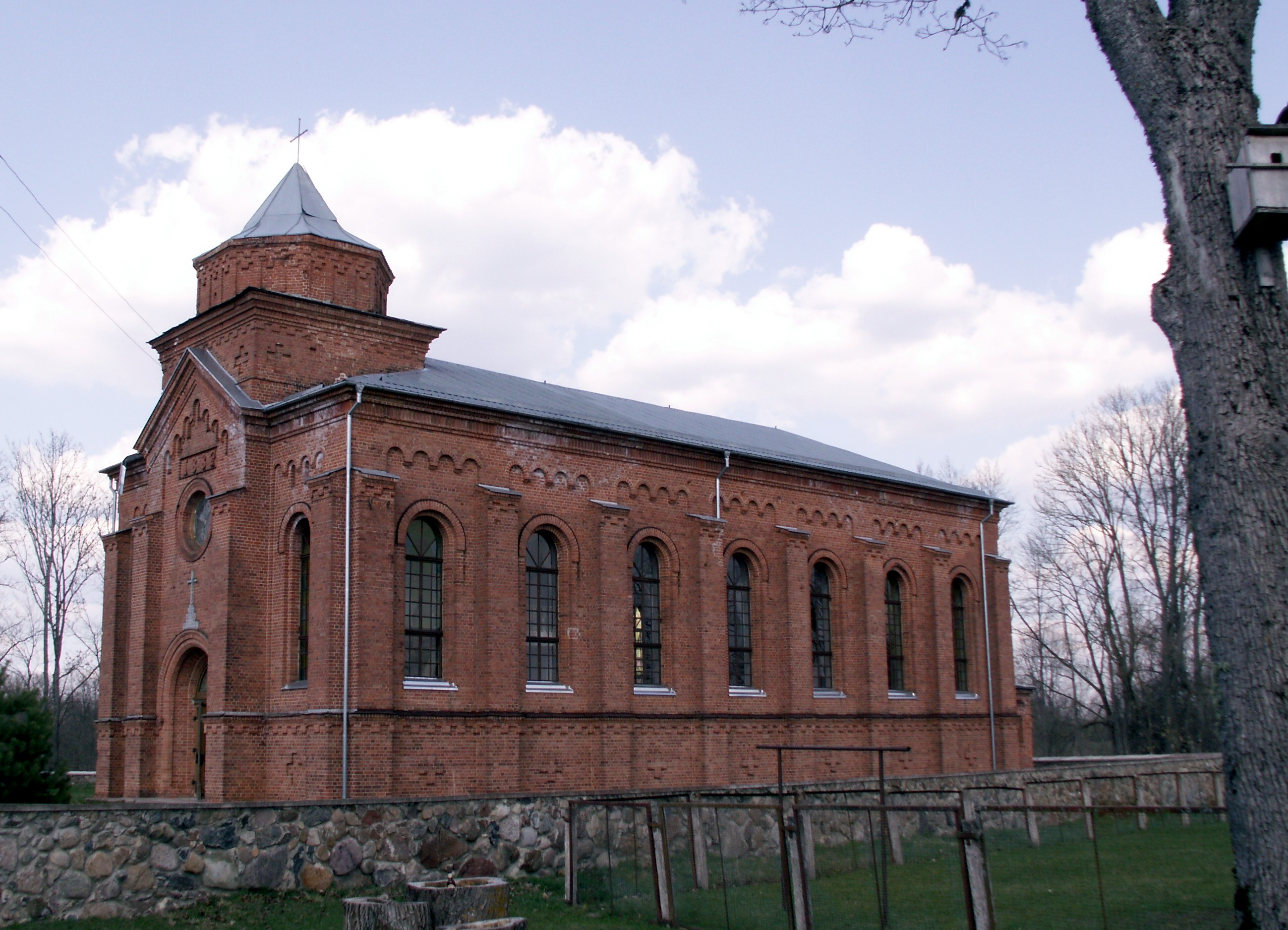
Nemunėlio Radviliškis Evangelical Reformed Church

Two ancient Roman enamelled bronze brooches were found in the settlement, during archeological excavations. A flat, symmetrical one with an animal head ornament and a similar round one.

Nemunėlio Radviliškis was first mentioned in 4 November 1586. It was founded by the Radvila noble family. The Evangelical Reformed Church of was built in 1590, a Catholic chapel in 1719, and the Catholic Church of the Virgin Mary was established in 1782.

People of different faiths – Catholics and Lutherans - have been living together here for centuries, just like in the whole Biržai region. In Lithuania, as in all of Catholic Europe, the Lutherans were not very popular. The Vilnius Diocesan Synod of 1744 forbade Lutherans to teach Catholic children, and intermarriage between a Catholic and a Lutheran was considered inappropriate and illegitimate. In 1729, Gruzdas, a priest of the Dominican monastery of Palėvenė, broke into and vandalised the Evangelical Reformed churches in Nemunėlio Radviliškis and Papiliai.

During the war with Sweden, the town sheltered a Swedish unit that had been defeated at Biržai Castle. In 1655, the Swedish Field Marshal Levenhaupt moved with part of his army from Kuoknese to Nemunėlio Radviliškis and established a camp there. Colonel Thaler was sent with 7 companies of infantry and 200 horsemen to capture Biržai. The Biržai Castle was captured and Urquard was appointed commandant. Lieutenant Colonel Martynas Šulcas was sent to take Palanga, Šventoji and Piltenė. Later, the Swedish army camp was moved from Nemunėlio Radviliškis to Pasvalys.

During the Kościuszko Uprising in 1794, rebels were hiding in the forests of the surrounding area, as the local population was being forcibly taken into their army. In 1804 a Catholic parish school was built. During the years of Lithuanian press ban The Nemunėlis and Apasčia Association of Book smugglers was founded in secret.

On 8 August 1941 the Jews of the town, about 70–80 men, women and children, were shot in Skamarakai grove.

In 2006 the coat of arms of Nemunėlio Radviliškis was adopted by a decree of the President of the Republic of Lithuania.

== Notable people ==
- Vincentas Sladkevičius (1920–2000), Lithuanian Cardinal of the Roman Catholic Church
