= Gubernija =

Lithuanian brewery

- Location: Šiauliai, Lithuania
- Opened: 1665

Active beers
Name	Type
Tamsusis
Nefiltruotas	Lager
Extra	Lager
Baltas	Wheat beer

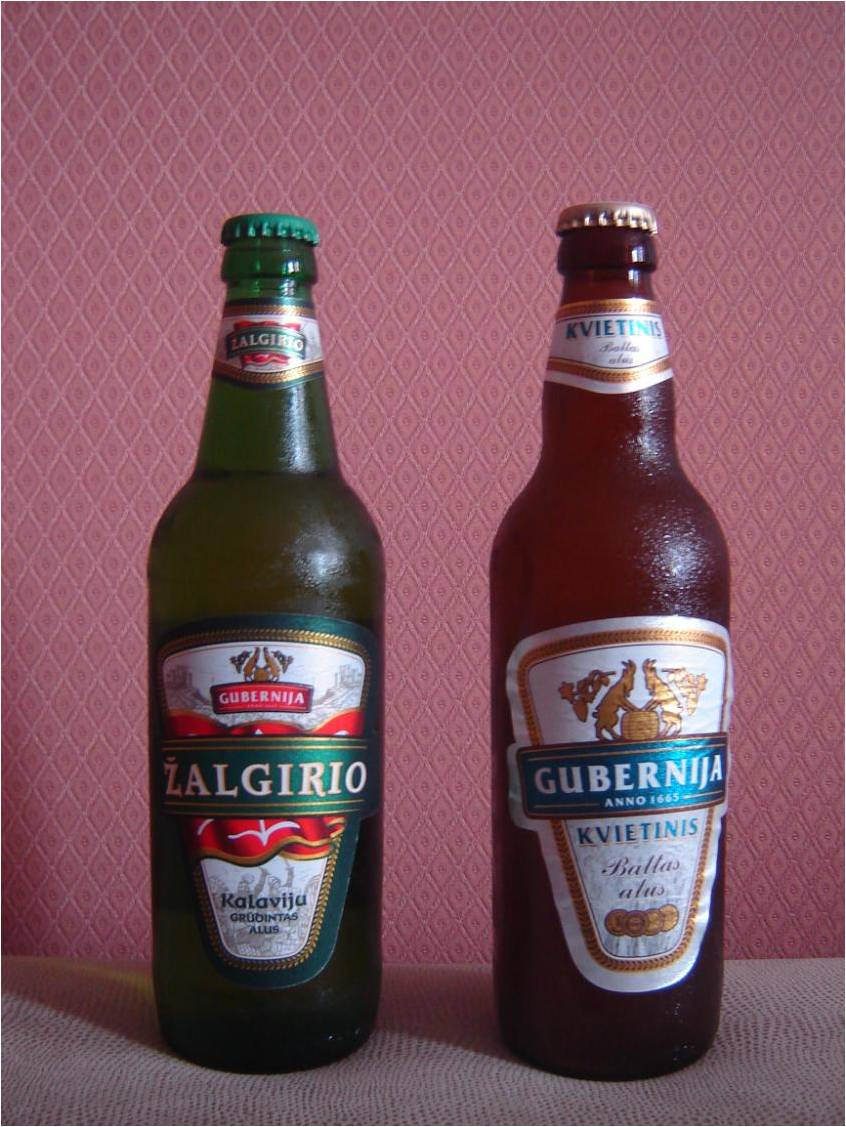
Bottles of Gubernija beer

Gubernija is a brewery in Lithuania. It is one of the oldest businesses in the world, and the oldest in Lithuania, having been founded in 1665.

Unlike other Lithuanian breweries, Gubernija has its own pubs.

Gubernija was privatised in 1999, and in 2006, it was taken over by Vitas Tomkus. The chairman during 1989-2006 was Romualdas Dunauskas. Gubernija was listed on the secondary list of the NASDAQ OMX Vilnius stock exchange until 2018 when it was purchased by MV Group holding company.

== Beers ==
- Ekstra, pale lager,
- Grand, malt liquor
- Ledas
- Ledukas, low alcohol beer
- Kunigaikščių, Dunkler bock
- Žigulinis, lager
- Dvaro Mišas
