= Jonas Yčas =

Lithuanian educator (1880–1931)

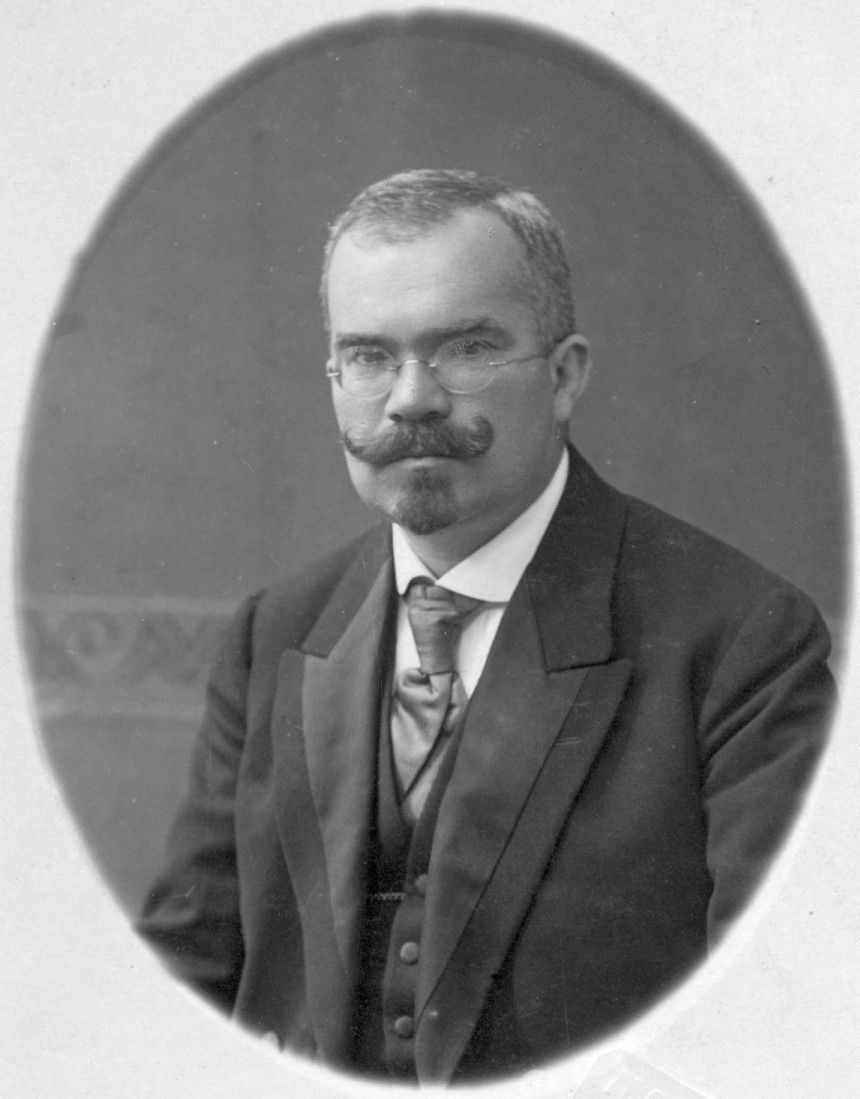
- Yčas in 1919
- Born: 21 July 1880; Šimpeliškiai, Russian Empire
- Died: 17 December 1931 (aged 51); Kaunas, Lithuania
- Education: Saint Petersburg Historical and Philological Institute; University of Königsberg
- Occupation: Educator
- Political party: Party of National Progress
- Relatives: Martynas Yčas (brother); Stanislovas Dagilis (uncle)

Jonas Yčas (21 July 1880 – 17 December 1931) was a Lithuanian educator and university professor. He served as the first minister of education of Lithuania from 11 November 1918 to 12 April 1919.

Yčas graduated from the Saint Petersburg Historical and Philological Institute which prepared teachers for Russian schools. He then worked as a teacher at the Tomsk Gymnasium (1903–1908), gymnasium inspector in Semipalatinsk (1908–1916), and gymnasium principal in Voronezh (1916–1918). Despite the long distance, Yčas remained involved in Lithuanian cultural life. He attended annual synods of the Lithuanian Evangelical Reformed Church and was elected its curator in 1910; he joined the Lithuanian Scientific Society and published articles in its journal Lietuvių tauta; he was the chairman of the educational section of the Lithuanian Society for the Relief of War Sufferers and organized the Lithuanian teachers' courses.

Yčas returned to Lithuania mid-1918. He became the minister of education in the first cabinet of prime minister Augustinas Voldemaras in November 1918 and continued to serve in the next two cabinets until April 1919. Yčas had to organize the ministry, recruit its personnel, evacuate the ministry to Kaunas at the start of the Lithuanian–Soviet War, and transition schools from the German Ober Ost administration. In 1920, he earned his doctorate degree from the University of Königsberg. He then worked as the principal of three gymnasiums in Panevėžys (Boys', Girls', and Russian) and as the curator of education in the Klaipėda Region (a position with the Directorate of the Klaipėda Region). He resigned in 1927, devoting his time to teaching history at Vytautas Magnus University, a position he held since 1922. Despite his life-long interest in history, he had little time to devote to research. His monograph on the history of the Duchy of Biržai and the Radziwiłł family was published shortly after his death in December 1931.

== Biography ==
=== Family ===
Yčas was born on 21 July 1880 in Šimpeliškiai near Biržai to a family of Lithuanian farmers that were members of the Lithuanian Evangelical Reformed Church. Yčas was the oldest of four siblings. According to a family tradition, they were descendants of Scottish Protestant refugees. Before the abolition of serfdom in 1861, the family were serfs of the Astravas Manor owned by the Tyszkiewicz family. However, the family was relatively wealthy and owned a windmill and two houses in Biržai. They owned about 33 desiatinas of land.

Yčas' father helped book smugglers to distribute banned Lithuanian-language publications and was imprisoned for three months. Fearing further arrests, he emigrated to the United States in 1890 and worked in the gold mines in Lead, South Dakota. He died there in 1913. The father did not support his family and it struggled financially. Nevertheless, Yčas and his younger brother Martynas, with the help of their uncle Stanislovas Dagilis and their Evangelical Reformed Church, managed to obtain higher education.

=== Education ===
Yčas received primary education at home and at an illegal Lithuanian village school (such schools were popular due to the Lithuanian press ban). In 1890, Yčas enrolled at the Mitau Gymnasium where he was looked after by Povilas Jakubėnas. However, his father's emigration to the United States and his mother's illness almost forced him to abandon his studies. He was saved due to an intervention by his uncle Stanislovas Dagilis, a local priest, and his community which raised funds for his education. He was a good student and lived with a local German family, which was controlling and limited Yčas' contacts with his own family. To escape the situation, in fall 1894, Yčas transferred to the to Slutsk Gymnasium, an old Evangelical Reformed school, but Tsarist authorities took control of the school in 1881. Yčas graduated from the gymnasium with a silver medal in 1898.

He applied to Saint Petersburg Historical and Philological Institute which was previously attended by his uncle Dagilis. However, he was late to submit paperwork and had to skip a year. He then applied to the Law Faculty of Saint Petersburg University, but did not attend it due to lack of funds. Therefore, Yčas studied at the institute from 1899 to 1903. The school focused on humanities, particularly the classical antiquity, and prepared teachers for Russian schools. The institute provided tuition and board for free, but its graduates had to work as teachers for at least six years. Yčas was interested in history and wrote his thesis on the formation of cities in Lithuania. In 1900, Yčas took his younger brother Martynas to Saint Petersburg to prepare him for gymnasium entrance exams.

=== Teacher in Tomsk ===
Yčas graduated in 1903 and was offered to stay at the institute to continue studies and become a professor, but refused and chose a teaching position at Tomsk Gymnasium. Tomsk had a university, which was important for Yčas' academic interests, and living conditions were better in Siberia (salaries were higher, bureaucracy was more liberal, discrimination based on nationality or social status was less). Yčas started his new position in July 1903 and taught there until October 1908. In addition, Yčas organized a private gymnasium, which was more liberal than the government gymnasium, in fall 1904 and was its principal until fall 1906. He also briefly taught Russian language and history at the newly established Tomsk Teachers' Institute and history at higher courses for women.

Yčas joined city's public life, was a member of various societies, and delivered public lectures. He was a member of the central committee of the local chapter of the Constitutional Democratic Party. He supported the Russian Revolution of 1905. On 2 November [O.S. 20 October] 1905, the monarchist Black Hundreds burned down the Korolyevskiy Theatre and railway administration building with protesters inside. According to his brother, Yčas participated in the protest, but left early. Tsarist police was interested in Yčas, but Karl Nolken, the governor of Tomsk, was a member of the Evangelical Reformed Church and that was enough to get Yčas out of trouble. When Nolken was reassigned to the Mogilev Governorate in September 1908, the Tsarist police resumed its investigation of Yčas. Therefore, in October 1908, Yčas moved to Semipalatinsk (Semey in present-day Kazakhstan) to work as a gymnasium inspector.

=== Gymnasium inspector in Semipalatinsk ===
Yčas' position in Semipalatinsk was supposed to be temporary, but he stayed there until December 1916. He was inspector of the boys' gymnasium and also taught history, psychology, Latin, and logic. On a few occasions, he was also acting principal. One of his students was the future writer Mukhtar Auezov who left warm recollections about Yčas and remained fond of Lithuania. As civil servant, Yčas was awarded the Order of Saint Stanislaus (3rd class in 1909) and the Order of Saint Anna (3rd class in 1913). In 1916, Yčas was promoted to State Councillor according to the Table of Ranks.

Yčas joined the Semipalatinsk branch of the Imperial Russian Geographical Society and was its deputy chairman from February 1911 to February 1913. Despite the long distance (travel back to Lithuania took up to 12 days), Yčas was active in Lithuanian cultural life. In 1905, he published an article about Lithuanians in Siberia in Lietuvių laikraštis, the first Lithuanian periodical in Russia after the Lithuanian press ban was lifted. In August 1906, he participated in a Lithuanian cultural evening in Biržai. In 1907, he joined the Lithuanian Scientific Society and attended its annual meetings. He also attended meetings of the Evangelical Reformed Church in Vilnius. In 1910, he travelled to Kraków to gather information about the Battle of Grunwald (that year was the 500th anniversary of the battle). He published his study in Lietuvių tauta and as a separate booklet in 1914. He was also a member of the Lithuanian Art Society. In 1912, he became one of the co-founders of the Biržai Printing Press. It was initiated by his brother Martynas.

=== Principal in Voronezh ===
In August 1915, Lithuanian students evacuated to Voronezh where Martynas Yčas organized two Lithuanian gymnasiums and other schools maintained by the Lithuanian Society for the Relief of War Sufferers. He invited Jonas Yčas to became principal of the boys' gymnasium. He refused because it would take him too long to relocate while the needs in Voronezh were urgent. Instead, minister of education Paul Ignatieff offered him principal's position at the 2nd Boys' Gymnasium in Voronezh.

Yčas departed from Semipalatinsk in December 1916. He quickly joined Lithuanian cultural life in Voronezh and became the chairman of the education section of the Lithuanian Society for the Relief of War Sufferers. The education section organized Lithuanian teachers' courses that grew into an institute. Yčas was the institute's director. The institute had 50 students who completed an accelerated course from October 1917 to April 1918. The course focused on the Lithuanian language which was taught by linguists Jonas Jablonskis and Juozas Balčikonis. The education section also worked on publishing various Lithuanian textbooks. It had plans for about 60 books, but managed to publish only a few works by Jonas Murka, Stasys Matjošaitis, Jonas Jablonskis, and Sofija Kymantaitė-Čiurlionienė.

After the October Revolution, Lithuanians faced persecution by the new Bolshevik regime. Several members of the Supreme Lithuanian Council in Russia, including Mykolas Sleževičius, Martynas Yčas, Julijonas Jasienskis, Juozas Vokietaitis, Zigmas Žemaitis, Adomas Varnas, Eliziejus Draugelis, and several students were arrested. According to his brother and daughter, Jonas Yčas freed them by taking 13,000 rubles from the 2nd Boys' Gymnasium and bribing police officials.

=== Minister of education ===
After the Treaty of Brest-Litovsk, Lithuanian refugees began returning home. In June 1918, Lithuanian teachers and students in Voronezh hired a special train to transport them to Vilnius. The journey took 16 days. Yčas was invited to join education commission of the Council of Lithuania which discussed issues of Lithuanian schools and possibilities of reestablishing Vilnius University. He joined the Party of National Progress.

When Lithuanians organized their first cabinet of ministers on 11 November 1918, Yčas became the minister of education. Officially, Yčas held the title of director or valdytojas due to disagreements between Lithuanian political parties as to who should become the minister.

Yčas recruited a number of prominent Lithuanians, including Mykolas Biržiška, Marcelinas Šikšnys, Pranas Mašiotas, Jonas Jablonskis, Jokūbas Šernas, Antanas Žmuidzinavičius, Tadas Ivanauskas, Jonas Vabalas-Gudaitis, Vincas Čepinskis, Jonas Basanavičius, Liudas Gira, Balys Sruoga, Juozas Tallat-Kelpša, Vladas Nagevičius, Vytautas Pranas Bičiūnas, Paulius Galaunė. The ministry worked to organize its departments, establish contacts with Lithuanian schools to ensure their transition from the German Ober Ost to Lithuanian administration, and convene a teachers' conference. The ministry approved a number of new schools as well as took over the Lithuanian Rytas Gymnasium for boys and started organizing a gymnasium for girls in Vilnius. It also drafted plans for reestablishing Vilnius University and had scheduled its official opening for 1 January 1919.

However, the work was interrupted by the outbreak of the Lithuanian–Soviet War. The Lithuanian government evacuated from Vilnius to Kaunas on 3 January 1919. Prime Minister Augustinas Voldemaras left for Germany causing a government crisis. Mykolas Sleževičius stepped up and formed a new cabinet on 26 December 1918. Mykolas Biržiška became the new minister of education, but he remained in Vilnius. Therefore, Yčas continued to lead the ministry. When Sleževičius Cabinet I resigned on 7 March 1919, reportedly, Yčas was offered the prime minister post but refused. He became the minister of education in the Dovydaitis Cabinet but this cabinet lasted only a month until 12 April 1919. Yčas was replaced by Juozas Tūbelis.

In Kaunas, the ministry had to effectively start anew and recruit new employees and activists as many people remained in Vilnius. The primary goal of the ministry was to implement universal primary education, which necessitated establishment of numerous new schools and at least four teachers' seminaries in Veiveriai, Panevėžys, Vilnius, and Telšiai or Šiauliai. At the time, it was the second largest government agency (after the Ministry of Defence) and employed more than 2,000 people. Yčas visited Germany on 10–30 March 1919 to learn about its education system and not solely rely on the inherited Russian system. This trip, during a government crisis, was criticized by his opponents. Yčas raised the idea of inviting Finnish professor Aukusti Niemi to Lithuania as an advisor on the primary education system (which was done after Yčas' departure from the ministry).

=== Principal in Panevėžys ===
After his tenure at the Ministry of Education, Yčas chose to study at the University of Königsberg. He studied medieval history for four semesters under professor Albert Brackmann. He wrote his doctoral thesis on the 16th-century chronicler Simon Grunau. In July 1920, he was granted two degrees – master's of liberal arts and doctorate in philosophy.

Upon return to Lithuania in May 1920, he was appointed principal of both the Panevėžys Boys' and Girls' Gymnasiums replacing Juozas Balčikonis. Both gymnasiums shared the same premises. There were also parallel classes taught in Russian that had a gymnasium status. Yčas became a principal of this Russian gymnasium in January 1921. At the same time, Yčas taught history. From August 1920 to September 1924, Gabrielė Petkevičaitė-Bitė was deputy principal of the girls' gymnasium. She officially resigned due to health reasons, but in private correspondence blamed Yčas for pushing her out.

During his tenure, the number of students grew from 703 in 1919/20 to 1,076 in 1924/25 school year. In addition to academics, Yčas paid attention to students' cultural activities. The school organized various extracurricular activities, field trips (including one in 1921 led by Yčas to Klaipėda which was then a mandate of the League of Nations), exhibitions of student works (one in June 1921 was opened by bishop Pranciškus Karevičius and attended by about 4,000 people), meetings with prominent Lithuanians (including writer Žemaitė, activist Jonas Basanavičius, politicians Antanas Smetona, Augustinas Voldemaras, and Martynas Yčas, general Silvestras Žukauskas, professor Mykolas Biržiška, diplomat Jonas Aukštuolis). There were very few cultural events in the city, thus theater performances and concerts organized by the school attracted public interest. In 1921, the gymnasium adopted an optional school uniform for girls which was soon adopted nationally and was used in Lithuania until the 1990s. Yčas chaired an educational committee that raised funds to support Lithuanian schools in the Polish-controlled Vilnius Region. With support from Yčas, teacher and sculptor Juozas Zikaras sculpted the Statue of Liberty at the gymnasium; which was erected in Kaunas in 1928.

In 1920–1922, Yčas was an expert consultant to the Constituent Assembly of Lithuania and helped draft laws on primary education and the statute of the University of Lithuania. In 1922, in additions to his positions in Panevėžys, Yčas became a professor at the newly established University of Lithuania in Kaunas. In 1923, he was also the temporary principal of the new Panevėžys Progymnasium.

=== Education curator in Klaipėda ===
In March 1925, Yčas was invited to become the curator of education in the Klaipėda Region (a position with the Directorate of the Klaipėda Region). In June 1925, he resigned his positions in Panevėžys and moved to Klaipėda. Klaipėda Region was detached from East Prussia by the Treaty of Versailles. Lithuania gained control of the region after the Klaipėda Revolt in January 1923, but it retained autonomy.

The region's schools and teachers were heavily influenced by German culture and sluggishly implemented Lithuanian reforms that emphasized the teaching of the Lithuanian language. Yčas worked to implement the reforms that aimed to Lithuanize the schools. However, some Lithuanian activists believed that Yčas was not firm enough and gave in to German demands. Articles criticizing Yčas' work were published in Klaipėdos garsas (published by a local chapter of the Lithuanian Riflemen's Union) and Lietuvos žinios.

Yčas initiated establishment of the Klaipėda Accelerated School based on the German model. The school opened in May 1925. In mid-1926, Yčas also chaired a commission that prepared Lithuanian toponyms for several dozen localities in the region. Yčas resigned from the directory effective 1 November 1927.

=== University professor in Kaunas ===
The University of Lithuania was formally established on 16 February 1922 (anniversary of Lithuania's independence). Yčas was among the first five professors appointed to the Faculty of Humanities by the president of Lithuania on 22 May 1922. He became director of the section on the history of Lithuania, and continued to hold this position until his death when he was replaced by Ignas Jonynas. Yčas continued to live in Panevėžys and later Klaipėda, forcing a lengthy commute.

He primarily taught the history of Lithuania up to the death of Grand Duke Vytautas (1430), but also taught courses on sources on the history of Lithuania, history of Prussia, history of the Germans and Latvians, and historiography. Though it was not his specialty, Yčas also taught medieval history until the university hired Lev Karsavin. In his works and lectures, Yčas focused on discussing and analyzing primary sources without rushing to conclusions. Yčas emphasized the need for a historian to remain objective and avoid bias. For example, even though he was religious, he critically evaluated the Bible. He was able to present a more objective and balanced history of the Reformation, while many other Catholic historians treated it as heresy. Many of his lecture notes were published as separate books by the students.

In addition to lectures, Yčas worked to support his students. In 1925, he established and headed a history seminar, which had a 1,530-book library in 1932. He also continued to maintain contacts with professors of the University of Königsberg. In particular, he corresponded with philologist Adalbert Bezzenberger and worked to popularize his work in the Lithuanian press.

In 1924, Yčas worked to establish the Faculty of Evangelical Theology which prepared Evangelical clergy. In 1928, Yčas was awarded the Independence Medal. In December 1929, Yčas became a member of a government commission tasked with creating the official version of the coat of arms of Lithuania. The commission worked until 1934 and settled on a design by Mstislav Dobuzhinsky, but it was not confirmed.

=== Death ===
The Lithuanian government reduced the number of professors for the fall 1930 semester. For unknown reasons, Yčas's positions was cut in a decree signed by president Antanas Smetona. However, after appeals by the university, he was reinstated. His family and university colleagues, including historian Ignas Jonynas, attributed stress related to this dismissal as the cause for his deteriorating health.

In April 1931, Yčas traveled to Sweden to collect materials for his historical study on Biržai. He visited Uppsala and the National Archives of Sweden. He brought a copy of the Union of Kėdainiai to Lithuania. His health deteriorated in fall 1931 and he took a three-month vacation from the university to travel to Paris for treatments. He returned to Kaunas on 12 December 1931 and died five days later. His funeral procession was accompanied by the orchestra of the Vytautas the Great War Museum. His funeral on 20 December was attended by many government officials, including prime minister Juozas Tūbelis. He was buried in the Evangelical section of Kaunas Old Cemetery. His grave was destroyed when Soviet authorities demolished the cemetery and turned it into Ramybė Park in 1950s, thus the exact location of his burial is unknown.

== Historical studies ==
From a young age, Yčas was interested in history and often said that it was his dream to be able to devote his time to historical research. However, his work at the various schools and the university prevented him from carrying out in-depth research.

Yčas wrote two studies for his diplomas. His thesis on the formation of cities in Lithuania remains unpublished. His thesis on Simon Grunau and his chronicle Preussische Chronik was translated into Lithuanian and published in 1922. This thesis focused on the historiography of Grunau and discussed a number of issues related to the analysis of primary sources, but did not get into the analysis of the chronicle itself.

His monograph on the history of the Duchy of Biržai and the Radziwiłł family was published shortly after his death. Yčas mostly published short studies to commemorate historical events. His first published historical study was a 73-page booklet on the literature of the Roman Empire published in 1908 in Tomsk. He published studies for the 50th anniversary of the Emancipation reform of 1861, 300th anniversary of the House of Romanov, 500th anniversary of the Battle of Grunwald (it was one of the first studies on the battle by a Lithuanian historian), 500th death anniversary of Grand Duke Vytautas.

In addition to historical publications, Yčas wrote articles about other topics, including issues concerning education. For example, in 1921, he published an article on the Swiss educator Johann Heinrich Pestalozzi which considered him a worthy example to follow. Yčas contributed articles to at least 17 different Lithuanian periodicals, including Švietimo darbas, Lietuvos mokykla, Lietuvių balsas, Lietuvos aidas, Lietuva, Praeitis, Biržų žinios. He edited the first few issues of the Evangelical Reformed magazine Mūsų žodis until it was more firmly established.

Yčas edited the Lithuanian translations of the history of the Polish nation by Władysław Smoleński (published in 1925) and of the monograph on Grand Duke Vytautas by Josef Pfitzner (published in 1930).

Yčas was an active member of several learned societies, including the Imperial Russian Geographical Society, Lithuanian Scientific Society, and the Lithuanian Historical Society.

== Evangelical reformed church ==
Throughout his life, Yčas was actively involved with the Lithuanian Evangelical Reformed Church. While living in Russia, despite the long distance, Yčas usually attended the annual synods during his summer vacations. In June 1910, Yčas and Adomas Sketeris were elected curators of the church. They were the first people from the non-noble class to be elected to the position. In June 1912, Yčas succeeded in convincing the synod to open a gymnasium in Vilnius and tasked Yčas with organizational work, but it was interrupted by World War I.

After the war, Vilnius, the traditional center of the Lithuanian Evangelical Reformed Church, was incorporated into the Second Polish Republic. Evangelicals remaining in interwar Lithuania had to regroup and reorganize as well as rebuild parishes and churches damaged during the war. The first post-war synod met in Švobiškis; Yčas was elected synod's director. He also chaired the synods in 1920, 1921, and 1928. Yčas continued to serve as curator of the church. He became a member of the committees tasked with organizing a gymnasium in Biržai or Kaunas (was not accomplished) and an evangelical reformed parish in Kaunas.

== Business ventures ==
In summer 1918, Yčas became a co-founder of the Trade and Industry Bank. Jonas Yčas was one of six members of the bank's council. Initially, it was owned 50% by the Ministry of Finance, but his brother Martynas Yčas became the controlling shareholder in 1922. The bank quickly grew to become the second largest bank in Lithuania. It financed over a dozen businesses related to Martynas Yčas, but it does not appear that Jonas Yčas was involved in those ventures. The bank started experiencing financial difficulties and its council was replaced in September 1924. The bank declared bankruptcy in 1927. Martynas Yčas and other leaders of the bank were tried for criminal negligence.

Yčas become involved in several ventures in Biržai undertaken by Jonas Šliūpas (his daughter was married to Martynas Yčas). In September 1922, Yčas became one of the co-founders of Aušra press in Biržai which published weekly newspaper Biržų žinios. In spring 1923, Yčas became a member of a society to support the construction of the new premises for the Saulė Gymnasium in Biržai (Šliūpas was society's treasurer). Together with Šliūpas and Martynas Yčas, Jonas Yčas was one of the founders of Sveikatos versmė, a spa around mineral water springs in Likėnai near Biržai.

== Personal life ==
In November 1908, Yčas married Ona Neimanaitė, daughter of priest Adolfas Neimanas in Papilys. They had three daughters and three sons. Yčas helped his in-laws: his brother-in-law attended gymnasium in Semipalatinsk while his father-in-law sought refuge in Semipalatinsk during World War I (he died there in 1921). Yčas also helped his brother Martynas, his cousin Jokūbas Mikelėnas, and Jurgis Kuprevičius, son of physician Mykolas Kuprevičius, all of whom attended Tomsk University with Yčas's assistance.

In 1920, Yčas inherited his family's farm in Šimpeliškiai. Initially, he rented it out for three years. In 1923, he took over the farming – it mostly fell on his wife Ona to maintain. During World War II, Yčas's family retreated to Germany. Most members of the family eventually settled in the United States or Canada.

== Bibliography ==
- Aničas, Jonas (2007). Jonas ir Martynas Yčai: Gyvenimas ir darbai Lietuvai (in Lithuanian). Vaga. ISBN 978-5-415-01484-2.
- Baliūnas, Vytautas (2002). "Gabrielė-Marija-Jadvyga Petkevičaitė-Bitė". Panevėžio Juozo Balčikonio gimnazija 1727–2002 (in Lithuanian). Panevėžys: Nevėžio spaustuvė. pp. 344–346. ISBN 9955-450-30-4. Archived from the original on 3 March 2016.
- Bitautas, Algis; Tamošaitis, Mindaugas (2016). "Yčas Jonas" (PDF). In Tamošaitis, Mindaugas; Bitautas, Algis; Svarauskas, Artūras (eds.). Lietuvos Respublikos 1918–1940 m. vyriausybių ministrų biografinis žodynas (in Lithuanian). Vilnius: Mokslo ir enciklopedijų leidybos centras. pp. 183–188. ISBN 978-5-420-01778-4.
- Bočkutė, Indrė (30 January 2025). "Mokyklinės uniformos XX-ajame amžiuje" (in Lithuanian). Lietuvos švietimo muziejus.
- Butkevičius, Algirdas (29 August 2021). "Jonas Šliūpas: Biržuose rėmė laikraštį ir spaustuvę" (in Lithuanian). Lietuvos žurnalistų sąjunga.
- Kregždė, Jokūbas (1978). Lietuvos reformatų raštija: istorinė apžvalga (in Lithuanian). Chicago: Devenių kultūrinis fondas. OCLC 4836073.
- Lasinskas, Povilas (2004). Istorijos mokslas Vytauto Didžiojo universitete 1922–1940 metais (in Lithuanian). Vilnius: Vaga. ISBN 5-415-01714-3.
- Misiūnas, Romuald J. (Spring 1968). "Versailles and Memel". Lituanus. 1 (14). ISSN 0024-5089.
- Railaitė-Bardė, Agnė (2022). "The Greater Coat of Arms of Lithuania: To Be, or Not to Be?". Genealogica & Heraldica XXXV: Reformation, Revolution, Restoration (PDF). Cambridge: The Heraldry Society. ISBN 978-0-904858-07-5.
- Surblys, Alvydas (2006). "Martyno Yčo ekonominės veiklos Kaune pėdsakais". Kauno istorijos metraštis (in Lithuanian). 7: 111–136. ISSN 2335-8734.
- Terleckas, Vladas (1999). "Pirmasis nacionalinis komercinis bankas" (PDF). Pinigų studijos (in Lithuanian). 1: 56–62.
- X. (18 November 1924). "Lietuvos Prekybos ir Pramonės Bankas". Rytas (in Lithuanian). Vol. 261, no. 272. p. 3.
- Yčas, Martynas (2009). Iš Agaro krašto: 1885–1941 (PDF) (in Lithuanian). Kaunas: Candela. ISBN 978-9986-400-21-9.
- Zenevskienė, Rima (31 May 2011). "Jonas Yčas". Įžymių žmonių biobibliografijos (in Lithuanian). Martynas Mažvydas National Library of Lithuania.
