= Lithuanian schools in Voronezh =

Lithuanian schools in Voronezh were organized by Lithuanian war refugees in Voronezh during World War I. Lithuanian students and teachers were evacuated from Vilnius to Voronezh in August 1915 by the Lithuanian Society for the Relief of War Sufferers. The schools were closed in 1918 when most of the Lithuanians returned home.

Thanks to the efforts of Martynas Yčas, a member of the Russian State Duma, the Lithuanian Society received significant funds from the Imperial Tatiana Committee which allowed Lithuanians to establish boys' and girls' gymnasiums as well as other schools and courses culminating with the People's University (a folk high school) in September 1917. All students received full room and board, including clothing and textbooks, for free. The schools employed a number of prominent Lithuanians, including Pranas Mašiotas, linguists Jonas Jablonskis and Juozas Balčikonis, Sofija Kymantaitė-Čiurlionienė. Students organized their own societies, most prominent of which were the Catholic Ateitis and the socialist Aušrininkai.

== History ==
=== Evacuation ===
At the start of World War I, German Imperial Army pushed into the territory of Lithuania, then part of the Russian Empire. The Lithuanian Society for the Relief of War Sufferers was officially established in Vilnius in November 1914 to provide assistance to the people fleeing the hostilities. The society received substantial funds from the Imperial Tatiana Committee due to the efforts of Martynas Yčas, a member of the Russian State Duma.

At first, students and schools were evacuated to Vilnius. This included the Vilkaviškis Boys' Gymnasium. As the front approached, the Lithuanian Society sent Konstantinas Olšauskas, Juozas Vokietaitis, and Juozas Balčikonis to find a location deep inside Russia where Lithuanian schools could evacuate. They visited Oryol, Smolensk, Kursk, and settled on Voronezh. The evacuation started on 2 August 1915. About 1,000–1,500 students, teachers, and family members moved to Voronezh. Other schools were evacuated to other Russian cities, including Bogoroditsk (Dotnuva Agricultural School), Borovichi (Panevėžys School), Sorochinsk (Veiveriai Teachers' Seminary), Yaroslavl (Marijampolė Gymnasium).

=== Return to Lithuania ===
By the end of 1917, Voronezh was a cultural and educational center of Lithuanians in Russia. Lithuanian activities gained political undertones after the leadership of the Lithuanian Society for the Relief of War Sufferers and the weekly newspapers Lietuvių balsas and Vadas relocated to Voronezh in 1917. After the October Revolution, the newspapers and other property of the Lithuanian Society were seized by a Bolshevik committee headed by Vincas Mickevičius-Kapsukas, Karolis Požėla, Vaclovas Bielskis. Several leaders of the Lithuanian Society, including Martynas Yčas, were arrested.

After the Treaty of Brest-Litovsk was signed in March 1918, it became possible for Lithuanians to start returning home. Most of the Lithuanian students departed Voronezh on 16 June 1918. After a two-week journey, 1,342 people reached Vilnius.

== Schools ==
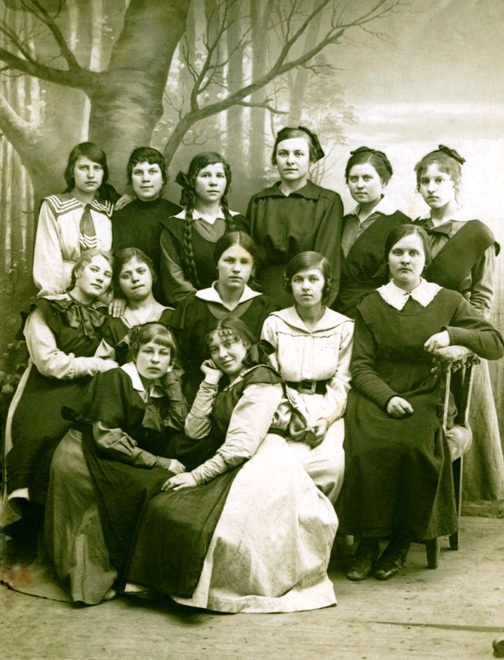
Students of the Girls' Gymnasium in 1918

The first and largest Lithuanian school in Voronezh was the boy's gymnasium named after Martynas Yčas. It officially opened on 10 September 1915 with about 500 students. In early 1916, it had 498 students: 409 Catholics, 62 Jews, 18 Eastern Orthodoxs, and 9 Protestants. The school employed prominent Lithuanians as teachers: linguists Jonas Jablonskis and Juozas Balčikonis taught Lithuanian and Latin, Konstantinas Šakenis taught physics, Marcelinas Šikšnys and Zigmas Žemaitis taught math, Antanas Tumėnas taught law, etc. The classes were taught in Russian, except for religion and the Lithuanian language.

The girls' gymnasium opened in November 1915 with 96 students. Pranas Mašiotas became the principal of both schools. Sofija Kymantaitė-Čiurlionienė taught language and literature to the girls. In 1916, more courses and schools were established, including preparatory courses (93 students), pedagogical courses (31 students), and bookkeeping courses (29 students). More courses were established in 1917, culminating with the People's University (a folk high school) in September 1917.

Students lived in dormitories (there were a total of three dormitories for girls and seven dormitories for boys). In February 1916, the dormitories housed 873 students. There was also a shelter that housed 36 boys and 60 girls. To further support the students and other refugees, the Lithuanian Society also opened sewing workshops, laundry, soup kitchen.

== Teachers' courses ==
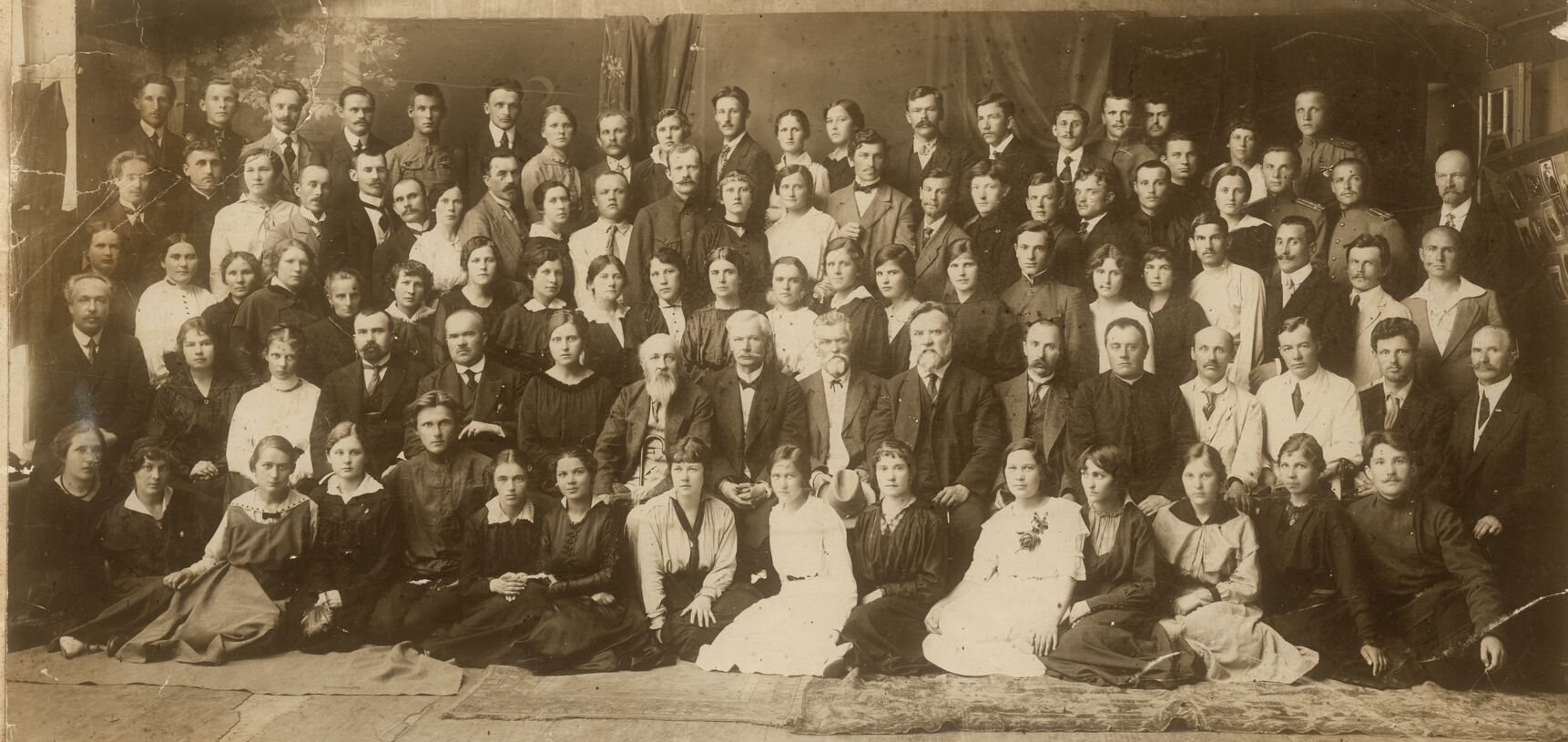
Teachers and students of teachers' courses in summer 1917. Teachers sit in the second row. From the left: Juozas Damijonaitis, Jadvyga Petrauskaitė, Marija Mašiotaitė-Urbšienė, Martynas Yčas, Jonas Yčas, Sofija Čiurlionienė, Jonas Jablonskis, Pranas Mašiotas, unknown, Jonas Šliūpas, Kazimieras Būga, Julijonas Jasienskis, Marcelinas Šikšnys, Kajetonas Sklėrius, Jonas Murka, Marcelius Vitkauskas

The summer teachers' courses were held in June–July 1917. They were funded by a 8,500 ruble grant from the Tatiana Committee and used premises of the 2nd Boys' Gymnasium, whose principal was Jonas Yčas. The courses highlighted the need for further education for teachers. Therefore, it was decided to establish the Teachers' Institute. It was organized by Jonas Yčas with partial funding from the All-Russian Committee to Assist Victims of War.

The institute admitted people who had completed other pedagogical education and had at least two years of teaching experience. It started lectures in late October 1917 with 50 students, including 19 guest students. The curriculum was based on an accelerated program of Russian teachers' institutes with added emphasis on the Lithuanian language. The Lithuanian language was taught by Jonas Jablonskis and Juozas Balčikonis for seven hours per week. Other classes included pedagogy, psychology, history, natural sciences, mathematics, Berlitz method for teaching languages, Russian and German languages, religion. The graduation ceremony was held on 27 April 1918.

== Student societies ==
Students organized their own societies, most prominent of which were the Catholic Ateitis and the socialist Aušrininkai. Initially, they operated in secret, but became official organizations in summer 1917 and organized publication of their periodicals Ateities spinduliai and Aušrinė.

Ateitis society was larger (about 400 students). It became more active in 1917 when priest Mykolas Krupavičius moved to Voronezh and became chaplain of the boys' gymnasium. Other prominent activists included Vytautas Endziulaitis and Leonas Bistras. Ateitis organized its first public conference in Voronezh on 2–13 June 1917. It discussed not only organizational issues related to Ateitis, but also many political issues related to Lithuania's political future and the upcoming Petrograd Seimas.

Aušrininkai had about 200 members, including Balys Sruoga and Juozas Žiugžda. In 1917, they had a choir, string orchestra, and theater group. A small group, which included Julius Janonis and Stasys Brašiškis and became known as visuomenininkai, advocated a more violent revolution and splintered from the main Aušrininkai group in December 1915. Antanas Sniečkus, the future First Secretary of the Communist Party of Lithuania, was too young to join visuomenininkai but supported them.

There was also a non-partisan group of about 80 students. They mimeographed newsletter Ugnelė and organized theater performances.

The Lithuanian community in Voronezh organized various cultural events, including song concerts and theater performances. A noted concert took place on 19 February 1916. It included performances by a choir directed by Vincas Nacevičius as well as soloists Adelė Nezabitauskaitė-Galaunienė and Paulina Valavičiūtė. Theater performances increased after Petras Tarulis moved to Voronezh at the end of 1916. He established an amateur theater group Skudučiai, which included the actress Nelė Vosyliūtė. The group staged plays by Liudas Gira, Marcelinas Šikšnys, Charles Dickens at the city theater.

== Finances ==
All students received full room and board, including clothing and textbooks, for free. While conditions were cramped, the schools and dormitories were relatively well organized and supplied given the ongoing war. This was possible due to grants from the Tatiana Committee (100,000 rubles specifically for the schools) and the Special Council for Refugees (Russian: Особое совещание по устройству беженцев) under the Ministry of Internal Affairs (1.4 million rubles in November 1915). Some Lithuanian activists, including Juozas Tumas-Vaižgantas, criticized such use of funds and argued that they should be used for more strategic goal of Lithuania's independence.

Further criticism was directed towards Konstantinas Olšauskas who became known as a strict enforcer of Catholic ideas and supporter of mandatory mass attendance attracting criticism from socialist-sympathizing activists. In fall 1916, Olšauskas expelled several students for refusing to attend the mass. Further rumors claimed that Olšauskas misused the funds – he purchased inferior goods at a premium from a certain Labkauskienė. The situation was inspected by Antanas Tumėnas, Jurgis Baltrušaitis, and Zigmas Žemaitis; Olšauskas was prohibited from purchasing goods from Labkauskienė in April 1916. Before the prohibition took effect, Olšauskas purchased the full inventory of Labkauskienė. The episode dealt a major blow to his reputation. In June, he took a long vacation to improve health at a Lithuanian sanatorium in Yalta and resigned from his position in Voronezh effective 1 September 1916. He was replaced by another Catholic priest Julijonas Jasienskis. He resigned in November 1917 due to criticism and complaints by communist-leaning activists who became bolder and more active after the October Revolution.

== List of institutions ==
List of Lithuanian schools and courses in Voronezh
#	Name	Lithuanian name	Date established
1	Martynas Yčas Boys' Gymnasium	M. Yčo berniukų gimnazija	September 1915
2	Martynas Yčas Girls' Gymnasium	M. Yčo mergaičių gimnazija	November 1915
3	Preparatory Courses of Saulė Society	"Saulės" draugijos parengiamieji kursai	Early 1916
4	Pedagogical Courses of Saulė Society	"Saulės" draugijos pedagoginiai kursai	Early 1916
5	Bookkeeping Courses of Saulė Society	"Saulės" draugijos buhalterijos kursai	1916
6	Vilkaviškis Boys' Gymnasium	Vilkaviškio berniukų gimnazija	1916
7	Primary School of Saulė Society	"Saulės" dviklasė pradinė mokykla	1916
8	Šančiai Primary School of Saulė Society	"Saulės" Šančių dviklasė pradinė mokykla	1916
9	Evening Courses for Handicrafts and Supervisors of Children's Shelters	Rankų darbų ir vaikų prieglaudų prižiūrėtojų vakariniai kursai	June 1916
10	Evening Courses for Farming	Kontralasistentų vakariniai kursai	Summer 1917
11	Summer Courses for Teachers	Vasaros mokytojų kursai	June–July 1917
12	Evening Courses for Adults	Vakariniai kursai suaugusiems	September 1917
13	Teachers' Institute	Mokytojų institutas	October 1917
14	People's University (folk high school)	Liaudies universitetas	September 1917

== Bibliography ==
- Aničas, Jonas (2007). Jonas ir Martynas Yčai: Gyvenimas ir darbai Lietuvai (in Lithuanian). Vaga. ISBN 978-5-415-01484-2.
- Andrijauskaitė, Ugnė Marija (2013). Aušrininkų organizacija 1910-1938 m. (PDF) (Master's thesis) (in Lithuanian). Kaunas: Vytautas Magnus University.
- Bulotaitė-Jurkūnienė, Giedrė (2017). "Sukanka 100 metų, bet..." (PDF). Naujoji Romuva (in Lithuanian). 3 (600): 8–11. Archived from the original (PDF) on 30 August 2018.
- Biržiška, Vaclovas, ed. (1953). "Aušrininkai". Lietuvių enciklopedija (in Lithuanian). Vol. I. Boston: Lietuvių enciklopedijos leidykla. OCLC 14547758.
- Čepėnas, Pranas (1986). Naujųjų laikų Lietuvos istorija. Vol. II. Chicago: Dr. Kazio Griniaus Fondas. OCLC 3220435.
- Pukienė, Vida (2008). "Voronežas – lietuvių švietimo židinys Rusijoje Pirmojo pasaulinio karo metais". Istorija (in Lithuanian). 70: 17–27. ISSN 1392-0456.
- Pukienė, Vida (2013). Prelatas Konstantinas Olšauskas: visuomenės veikėjo tragedija (PDF) (in Lithuanian). Edukologija. ISBN 978-9955-20-884-6. Archived from the original (PDF) on 2018-08-11.
- Yčas, Martynas (2009). Iš Agaro krašto: 1885–1941 (PDF) (in Lithuanian). Kaunas: Candela. ISBN 978-9986-400-21-9.
