= Jakubėnas =

Surname list

- Lithuanian surname
- m.: Jakubėnas
- f.: (unmarried): Jakubėnaitė
- f.: (married): Jakubėnienė

Jakubėnas is a Lithuanian language family name.

The surname may refer to:

- Vladas Jakubėnas (1904–1976), Lithuanian composer, pianist, musicologist and journalist
- Povilas Jakubėnas (1871–1953), Lithuanian clergyman
