= Vanagas =

- Lithuanian surname
- m.: Vanagas
- f.: (unmarried): Vanagaitė
- f.: (married): Vanagienė
- Origin: vanagas, "hawk"

Vanagas is a Lithuanian surname. Notable people with the surname include:

- Aleksandras Vanagas (1934–1995), Lithuanian linguist
- Benediktas Vanagas (born 1977), Lithuanian rally driver
- Birutė Rokaitė-Vanagienė (born 1934), Lithuanian linguist
- Justina Vanagaitė, Lithuanian dressage rider
- Povilas Vanagas (born 1970), Lithuanian ice dancer
- Rūta Vanagaitė, Lithuanian theatre critic, writer, public relations specialist, journalist and a public figure
- Sonata Vanagaitė, Lithuanian football striker

== See also ==
- Adolfas Ramanauskas, nom de guerre Vanagas ("Hawk") (1918–1957), one of the leaders of the Lithuanian resistance
