= Pranas Skardžius =

Lithuanian linguist, academic

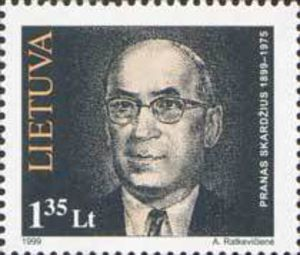
- Lithuanian postage stamp issued in 1999
- Born: 26 March 1899; Subačius, Russian Empire
- Died: 18 December 1975 (aged 76); Hot Springs, Arkansas, United States
- Board member of: Lithuanian Language Society

Academic background
- Education: University of Lithuania; Leipzig University; Case Western Reserve University
- Thesis: Slavic Loanwords in Ancient Lithuanian (1931)

Academic work
- Discipline: Linguistics
- Institutions: Vytautas Magnus University; Vilnius University; University of Tübingen; Library of Congress

Pranas Skardžius (26 March 1899 – 18 December 1975) was a Lithuanian linguist. Together with Antanas Salys, Skardžius was the first and most prominent linguist who matured in independent Lithuania.

As a student at Vytautas Magnus University, Skardžius became secretary of Jonas Jablonskis and with his help obtained a scholarship to study at Leipzig University. Upon his return to Lithuania, he lectured as a docent at Vytautas Magnus University in 1929–1939 and as a professor at Vilnius University in 1939–1943. In 1944, Skardžius emigrated from Lithuania due to the upcoming Soviet occupation. Skardžius worked at the University of Tübingen in West Germany in 1946–1949 and at the Library of Congress in Washington, D.C. in 1956–1971.

Skardžius wrote some 800 works and articles, both on purely academic subjects and on more practical issues of the everyday language. He was interested in the history of the Lithuanian language. His PhD thesis on the Slavic loanwords in ancient Lithuanian contained a list of 2,950 loanwords collected from 16–17th century Lithuanian texts. His habilitation was on the accentology of Mikalojus Daukša (1527–1613). In 1943, he published a 768-page work on word formation in Lithuanian which was supposed to be part of the planned historical grammar. However, World War II and subsequent emigration disrupted his research plans and he published only short academic articles. He was also interested in standardizing the Lithuanian language and developing clear linguistic norms. He published numerous articles on practical issues of everyday language. In 1950, together with others, he published a 606-page guide to the Lithuanian language. In 1973, he published a practical aid for Lithuanian Americans to help them find Lithuanian equivalents to international words.

== Biography ==
=== Education ===
Skardčius was born in Subačius to a family of Lithuanian peasants who owned 21.5 hectares (53 acres) of land. He attended a primary school in Subačius and then a four-year school in Panevėžys. Due to World War I, he dropped out of school but continued self-education at home. In January 1920, he passed entrance examinations to the 5th grade at Panevėžys Gymnasium. He graduated from the gymnasium in June 1923 with a gold medal. His teachers included Gabrielė Petkevičaitė-Bitė and Julijonas Lindė-Dobilas. He was an active student and helped organizing an art club.

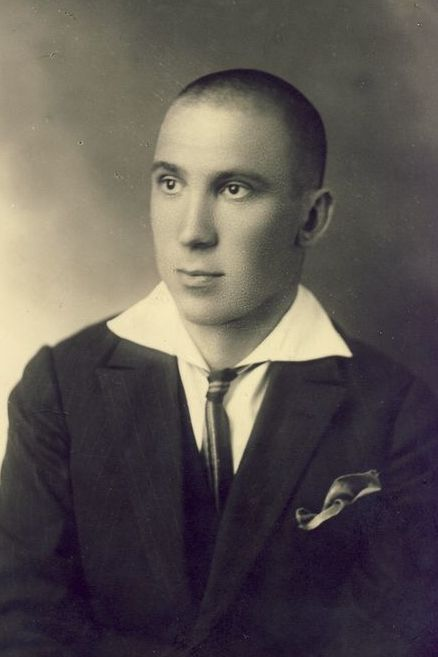
Skardžius in 1925

In fall 1923, Skardžius enrolled into the University of Lithuania to study the Lithuanian language. His professors included Kazimieras Būga, Jonas Jablonskis, Mykolas Biržiška, Eduards Volters, Juozas Tumas. He became close with Jablonskis and worked as his assistant and secretary. After the death of Būga in December 1924, the university was left without a strong linguistics professor. Therefore, it was decided to send two students, Skardžius and Antanas Salys, to study with the Lithuanian linguist Georg Gerullis who lectured at Leipzig University. His other teachers included Reinhold Trautmann, Heinrich Junker, and Hans Driesch. He studied Baltistics with minors in Slavistics and philosophy. In 1929, Skardius defended his PhD thesis on Slavic loanwords in ancient Lithuanian.

=== Career ===
In 1929–1939, Skardžius lectured at Vytautas Magnus University some of the key courses in Lithuanian language studies: Lithuanian language historical grammar and history, dialectology, Prussian language. Lacking qualifies staff, he occasionally taught other classes such as history of the Russian language and Old Church Slavonic. He wanted to become the editor of the Academic Dictionary of Lithuanian, but Juozas Balčikonis was chosen instead perhaps due to his connections with the President Antanas Smetona and Prime Minister Juozas Tūbelis. Skardžius advised Balčikonis on how best to prepare the dictionary but remained critical of his efforts, particularly of spelling choices. There were attempts at replacing Balčikonis with Skardčius as the editor of the dictionary in 1940–1941.

In 1930, Skardžius established and edited the academic journal Archivum Philologicum. In total, eight issues of the journal were published. In 1933, he completed his habilitation on the accentology of Mikalojus Daukša and was promoted to docent. In 1935, he co-founded and became chairman of the Lithuanian Language Society. He chaired the society in 1935–1941, 1946–1949, and 1958–1968. When Lithuania gained Vilnius as a result of the Soviet–Lithuanian Mutual Assistance Treaty, part of Vytautas Magnus University was moved to Vilnius University and Skardžius become a professor in Vilnius until 1943. In 1941, he joined the newly established Lithuanian Academy of Sciences and briefly headed its Institute of the Lithuanian Language.

In 1944, Skardžius emigrated from Lithuania due to the upcoming Soviet annexation of the state. For about two years he lived in Göttingen. In 1946–1949, he worked at the University of Tübingen and taught classes on Baltic and Lithuanian languages. In 1949, he emigrated to the United States and settled in Cleveland. Unable to find employment based on his education, he worked as a manual laborer at several factories. After he was fired from one of the jobs and was unemployed for 14 months, Skardžius began master studies of the library science at the Case Western Reserve University. He graduated in 1955 and worked at the Library of Congress in Washington, D.C. until 1971. He retired in 1973 and moved to Hot Springs, Arkansas where he died in 1975.

In 1999, Lietuvos paštas issued postal stamp with the portrait of Skardžius. In 2013, a street in Aleksotas, Kaunas was named after Skardžius.

== Works ==
Skardžius wrote some 800 works and articles. Five volumes of his selected works were published in 1996–1999 with two additional volumes of indexes and bibliography in 2013–2014. He wrote both purely academic studies and practical advice to the general public. He published separate books on Lithuanian accentology (1935), accentuation (1936, 1968), word formation (1943), guide (1950), course (1962) and usage (1971) of standard Lithuanian, Lithuanian equivalents of international words (1973). He published many more studies, articles, reviews in various periodicals and academic press, including in journal Gimtoji kalba (about 80 articles and 458 answers to readers' questions in 1933–1967) and in Lietuvių enciklopedija (35-volume Lithuanian encyclopedia published in Boston). He was invited to become language editor of the encyclopedia, but refused due to disagreements with the publisher.

=== Academic studies ===
His first larger published work was his PhD thesis on the Slavic loanwords in ancient Lithuanian. He planned to supplement it with a second volume which would discuss Slavic and Lithuanian cultural contacts and Slavic influence on the Lithuanian language, but it was never written. The thesis listed and discussed 2,950 loanwords collected from 16–17th century Lithuanian texts. It was not an exhaustive list as Skardžius did not utilize all Lithuanian texts from the period and not all Slavic loanwords were listed from the texts used. Later in life Skardžius published articles on specific issues regarding loanwords, including their accentology, Lithuanian loanwords in Slavic languages, Jewish loanwords in Lithuanian, calques, and more extensive analysis of individual words. He also studied borrowed syntax, mainly as a result of translations from Slavic languages. Skardžius divided loanwords into two categories: truly ancient loanwords that have no Lithuanian equivalents (e.g. various words related to the Catholic Church that likely came with the Christianization of Lithuania at the end of the 14th century) that should continue to be used in the standard Lithuanian; and more recent loanwords that have readily available Lithuanian equivalents and should not be used in the standard Lithuanian.

While living in Lithuania, Skardžius planned to write a series of related studies on the historical grammar of Lithuanian, extensive history of written Lithuanian, academic syntax. However, he managed to complete only the 768-page work on word formation which was supposed to be part of the planned historical grammar. It was a well received and replaced August Leskien's 1891 work as the best and most authoritative reference on the subject. The study analyzed nouns with suffixes, compound nouns, verb formation, and developments of neologisms in the natural language. German professor Franz Specht organized its translation to German but it was not completed due to World War II.

After emigrating from Lithuania, Skardžius could no longer conduct in-depth studies of the Lithuanian language as most research material remained in Lithuania. He then published smaller articles and practical works for the public. Some of his notable articles include on Lithuanian hydronyms, personal names of the 16th century, mythological names of Lithuanian gods, etymology of ancient words and what evidence they could provide about the ancient Lithuanian society (e.g. how Lithuanians named agricultural items).

=== Language standardization ===
From early in his career, Skardžius was interested in standardizing the Lithuanian language, developing clear linguistic norm, and teaching this norm to the general public. He also wrote several theoretical articles discussing the principles and standards that should be followed in standardizing the language or developing new terminology. His principles were similar to those developed by the Prague linguistic circle. When these principles were published in 1932, Skardžius adopted them and used in his later work. A key principle was that linguists needed to apply not only intuition and feel of the language, but also scientific methods and principles.

In 1930, Skardžius established magazine Kalba to discuss the standard language, but only three issues were published. The work on language standardization became more active when several linguists began publishing magazine Gimtoji kalba in 1933 and when Skardžius co-founded and became chairman of the Lithuanian Language Society in 1935. In 1933–1967, Skardžius published about 80 articles and 458 answers to readers' questions in Gimtoji kalba. He published about 50 articles in other periodicals, including in Dirva and Draugas where he had regular language sections. He defended such words as protėvis (ancestor), keliauninkas (traveler), nuosavybė (possession, property), pirmyn (forward), ūpas (mood) that were criticized by Jonas Jablonskis and Juozas Balčikonis. Skardžius also created several Lithuanian neologisms to replace foreign loanwords, some of which have been widely adopted.

After completing the study on accentology of accentology of Mikalojus Daukša, Skardžius prepared and published a practical school textbook on accentology of Lithuanian in 1936. An expanded and more general book on the accentology was published in 1968 in Chicago; it was intended as a textbook for the students at the Lithuanian Institute of Education and included discussion of accentuation in Lithuanian dialects as well as historical texts. In 1950, while still in Germany, together with Stasys Barzdukas and Jonas Martynas Laurinaitis, Skardžius published 606-page guide to the Lithuanian language. It described standard Lithuanian pronunciation, spelling, and accentuation, word formation and syntax. It also included a lengthy accented spelling dictionary. In 1973, he published a practical aid for Lithuanian Americans to help them find Lithuanian equivalents to international words. This was in response to a new threat – not the traditional Slavic loanwords, but an increasing use of English words and terms by the Lithuanians. Just before his death, Skardžius completed a 2,000-page six-volume dictionary of written Lithuanian; a copy of the unpublished manuscript is kept at Vilnius University Library.

== Bibliography ==
- Dambriūnas, Leonardas (February 1976). "Pranas Skardžius". Aidai (in Lithuanian). 2.
- Jonikas, Petras (March 1969). "Ties plačiu lituanistikos baru (apie prof. Pr.Skardžių)". Aidai (in Lithuanian). 3 (219–232).
- Pupkis, Aldonas (2012). "Pranas Skardžius ir didysis Lietuvių kalbos žodynas". Acta Linguistica Lithuanica (in Lithuanian). 67: 101–129. ISSN 1648-4444.
- Rosinas, Albertas (2011). Pranas Skardžius: gyvenimas ir darbai (in Lithuanian). Vilnius: Vilniaus universitetas. ISBN 9786094590016.
- Sabaliauskas, Algirdas; Urnėžiūtė, Rita (2 March 2021) [2018]. "Lietuvių kalbos draugija". Visuotinė lietuvių enciklopedija (in Lithuanian). Mokslo ir enciklopedijų leidybos centras.
- Sabaliauskas, Algirdas (10 July 2019) [2012]. "Pranas Skardžius". Visuotinė lietuvių enciklopedija (in Lithuanian). Mokslo ir enciklopedijų leidybos centras.
