= Stanislovas Dagilis =

Lithuanian poet and teacher (1843–1915)

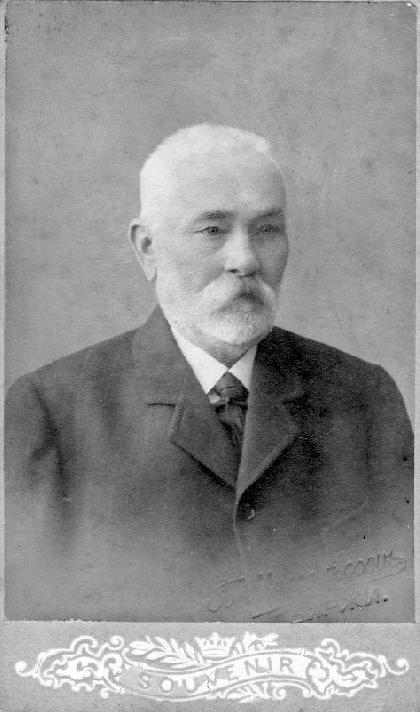
- Born: 17 March 1843; Mažutiškiai, Russian Empire
- Died: 19 December 1915 (aged 72); Biržai, Russian Empire
- Education: Saint Petersburg Historical and Philological Institute
- Occupations: Teacher, translator, poet
- Notable work: Lietuviškas šiupinys
- Movement: Lithuanian National Revival
- Relatives: Jonas Yčas (nephew); Martynas Yčas (nephew)
- Awards: Order of Saint Anna; Order of Saint Stanislaus

Stanislovas Dagilis (17 March 1843 – 19 December 1915) was a Lithuanian poet and teacher. He is best known as publisher of four issues of Lietuviškas šiupinys, a collection of translated poetry, in 1884–1910.

Born to a family of serfs, Dagilis attended gymnasiums in Kėdainiai and Slutsk maintained by the Lithuanian Evangelical Reformed Church. He graduated from the Saint Petersburg Historical and Philological Institute which prepared teachers for Russian gymnasiums. For 21 years, until 1894, Dagilis taught classical languages at a gymnasium in Sumy (present-day Ukraine).

Despite the long distance and isolation from other Lithuanian activists, Dagilis joined the Lithuanian National Revival. He contributed articles on Lithuanian topics to Russian press, joined the Lithuanian Literary Society, wrote and translated poetry (most notably the narrative poem Konrad Wallenrod by Adam Mickiewicz). After retiring from teaching, he returned to Lithuania and continued to be active in Lithuanian cultural life. He supported and mentored local youth, collected samples of Lithuanian folk songs, published edited hymnal for the Evangelical Reformed Church in 1910. He died of cancer in 1915.

== Biography ==
=== Education ===
Dagilis was born on 17 March [O.S. 5 March] 1843 in Mažutiškiai north of Biržai to a family of serfs which belonged to Parovėja Manor. His family were members of the Lithuanian Evangelical Reformed Church and worked 33 desiatinas of land. He was the oldest child (he had four younger sisters) and thus was expected to inherit the farm.

He attended a primary school in Biržai. His musical talents were noticed by the parish superintendent Konstantinas Močiulskis. At the age of 18, Dagilis was sent to study organ music in Kėdainiai so he could work as a church organist. However, he was bright and quickly picked up Russian, geography, arithmetic from roommates. This allowed him to enroll into the third grade of Kėdainiai Gymnasium which was maintained by the Evangelical Reformed Church. The school was closed a year later due to the Uprising of 1863.

Dagilis then transferred to Slutsk Gymnasium which was maintained by the Evangelical Reformed Church. The school focused on humanities, particularly on the classical antiquity, its languages, literature, and history. It is likely that Dagilis received a stipend from the church, but he still struggled financially. According to his nephew Martynas Yčas, Dagilis traveled for three weeks on foot to Slutsk as he could not afford a carriage. Upon graduation from the gymnasium, Dagilis continued his education at the Saint Petersburg Historical and Philological Institute which prepared teachers for Russian gymnasiums. The institute provided free tuition and board in exchange for at least six years working as a teacher.

=== Teacher ===
Dagilis graduated from the institute in 1873 and obtained a job teaching Latin and Greek languages at the Oleksandrivska Male Gymnasium in Sumy (present-day Ukraine). Despite the long distance and isolation from other Lithuanian activists, Dagilis joined the Lithuanian National Revival. He contributed articles on Lithuanian topics to Russian press. In 1881, he joined the Lithuanian Literary Society established in East Prussia to study the Lithuanian language. Daigilis sent the society a selection of 23 Lithuanian folk songs that were sung in the Biržai region.

In 1894, after 21 years at the Sumy Gymnasium, Dagilis retired due to hearing loss with an annual pension of 588 rubles. For his teaching, he was awarded the Order of Saint Anna (3rd degree in 1884) and Order of Saint Stanislaus (3rd degree in 1881 and 2nd degree in 1891).

=== Later life ===
Dagilis returned to Lithuania and settled in Biržai. Due to progressing hearing loss, he avoided public gatherings, but his home was visited by various Lithuanian intellectuals, including Povilas Jakubėnas and Mykolas Kuprevičius. Dagilis owned a large personal library which he allowed others to use. It included rare Lithuanian books, including the Postil of Jonas Bretkūnas (1591). The library was lost during World War I. He interacted with, financially supported, and became a mentor of local youth. In particular, he looked after the future poets Julius Janonis and Kazys Binkis. He helped his nephews Jonas Yčas and Martynas Yčas obtain an education.

Around 1896–1897, Dagilis organized a choir and held practice in his apartment after mass on Sunday. However, after several years, he had to give it up due to his hearing loss. Other sources claim that he organized the choir in 1908 which became the basis for the cultural Lyra Society. The society staged amateur theater performances and was active until 1915. During summers in 1902–1907, Dagilis and Konstantinas Galkauskas toured villages and recorded Lithuanian folk songs. In December 1909, Dagilis became a member of the Lithuanian Scientific Society. Dagilis spent about seven years editing the hymnal of the Evangelical Reformed Church which was published in 1910.

In 1909, Dagilis became one of the co-founders of a four-year school in Biržai which was initiated by Povilas Jakubėnas. In 1912, Dagilis became one of the co-founders of the Biržai Printing Press which was initiated by his nephew Martynas Yčas. He also wanted to establish a charitable society for mutual aid, but it was carried out due to disagreements with the Evangelical Reformed Church.

=== Death and legacy ===
In July 1915, as a result of the Great Retreat, Germans occupied Biržai. Dagilis, ill with cancer, remained in the city while his relatives evacuated to Russia. In his last days, Dagilis was looked after by Catholic priest Kazimieras Rimkevičius. According to Juozas Tumas, Dagilis's death was hastened by shock caused by two German bombs that exploded near his house in early November 1915. Dagilis died on 19 November 1915 and was buried next to his parents in Peleniškiai. Dagilis never married and had no children.

In September 1923, a memorial bust of Dagilis by sculptor Nina Gronskaya was unveiled by minister of education Leonas Bistras. The monument was financed by Martynas Yčas. While it was moved several times, it survives to the present day.

In 1973, a collection of Dagilis's poetry and translations were published by Vytautas Vanagas.

== Works ==
=== Translated poetry ===
Dagilis is best known for poetry translations to Lithuanian. He translated works of Adam Mickiewicz (Konrad Wallenrod, Trzech Budrysów, Pan Tadeusz), Władysław Syrokomla (Urodzony Jan Dęboróg translated as Lietuva), Alexander Pushkin (excerpts from Eugene Onegin), Ivan Nikitin, Aleksey Koltsov, Mikhail Lermontov (The Angel, Three Palms), Gavrila Derzhavin, Friedrich Schiller, Aleksey Koltsov. Dagilis translated works that varied in genre and style and, unlike many other contemporary Lithuanian translations, remained true to the originals and avoided Lithuanizing them. His most popular and well received translation was that of Konrad Wallenrod.

Dagilis published four volumes of poetry titled Lietuviškas šiupinys. The first 16-page booklet was published in 1884 by the Mauderode Printing Press in Tilsit. Expanded to 48 pages and corrected, it was republished in 1906 in Riga. This edition included 24 translated works and Joninės Parovėjos karčemoj, an original poem by Dagilis. The second 27-page booklet was published in 1891 by Martynas Jankus in Tilsit. This publication included the first half of the translation of Konrad Wallenrod. Expanded to 66 pages, this publication was republished by Martynas Kukta in 1910 in Vilnius. This edition included the full translation of Konrad Wallenrod.

=== Original poetry ===
Dagilis published very little of original poetry:

- A quatrain about home printed on the cover of Lietuviškas šiupinys in 1884. It became popular and was added to school curriculum in interwar Lithuania.
- Skaitytojui is a rhymed introduction to the reader of Lietuviškas šiupinys in 1884
- Čiūčia liūlia, varguolėli is a peculiar lullaby with religious moralization
- Artojui is an idyll about nature
- Joninės Parovėjos karčemoj is a humorous and playful poem about youth celebrating the Saint Jonas's Festival in Parovėja inn. It is most popular of Dagilis's poems. It was adapted into a song by Vytautas Kernagis.

He also wrote a few poems following examples of other authors, including Adam Asnyk and Friedrich Schiller.

Dagilis's poetry reflects village life and belongs to literary realism. Dagilis's poetry was influenced by Adam Mickiewicz. He, in turn, influenced poets Julius Janonis and Kazys Binkis.

=== Hymnal ===
The 6th edition of the official hymnal of the Evangelical Reformed Church was published in 1910. It has 348 pages and 214 hymns. It was last substantially revised in 1877. Dagilis spent about seven years editing the hymnal. He removed about 100 hymns, newly retranslated some hymns from Polish or German, borrowed other hymns from Prussian Lithuanians. Dagilis edited remaining hymns to modernize the Lithuanian language, remove barbarisms, improve the verse, etc. He also suggested printing the hymnal not in the traditional blackletter script, but in the Latin typeface. Such modernization efforts were met with reluctance from the older members of the congregation. A new hymnal edited by Adomas Šernas was published in 1942, but Dagilis' hymnal continued to be used by the church until it made Šernas' work the official hymnal in 1986.

Dagilis also added an introductory article, a rather detailed historiography of the Evangelical Reformed Church. Some hymns were edited by Jonas Šepetys, Povilas Jakubėnas, and Adomas Cumftas. Dagilis employed Julius Janonis as his assistant; Janonis helped copy the texts.

=== Newspaper articles ===
Dagilis published tow articles in Aušra, the first Lithuanian periodical for Lithuania proper. He published a study on Lithuanian written works in 1884. This article reflected romantic nationalism: Dagilis searched for pre-Christian Lithuanian runes and attempted to showcase pagan Lithuanian culture as equal to other European cultures. This articles was particularly well regarded by Juozas Tumas. In an article on poetry in 1886, he discussed differences between prose and verse and their relationship with reality and emotions. He praised the poem The Forest of Anykščiai by Antanas Baranauskas. It is considered the first Lithuanian text on theoretical aspects of poetry.

While living in Sumy, Dagilis contributed articles on Lithuanian cultural topics to Russian periodicals, including Golos (ethnographic article on Lithuanians), Russkiy Vestnik (on Christmas), Sovremennye Izvestiya (examples of Lithuanian proverbs), and Sankt-Peterburgskie Vedomosti (short local news).

Dagilis published articles in Draugija (in response to criticism of his translations of Konrad Wallenrod by Petras Kriaučiūnas) and Vilniaus žinios. He also collaborated in Pasiuntinys (1911–1913) and Biržų kalendorius (1911–1915) which were published by the Evangelical Reformed Church.

== Bibliography ==
- Aničas, Jonas (2001). "Poetas ir pedagogas Stanislovas Dagilis" (PDF). Krantai (in Lithuanian). 4: 86–93. ISSN 0235-6384.
- Aničas, Jonas (2007). Jonas ir Martynas Yčai: Gyvenimas ir darbai Lietuvai (in Lithuanian). Vaga. ISBN 978-5-415-01484-2.
- Baublys, Arūnas (2009). "Reformatai aušrininkai ir varpininkai Lietuvos tautinio atgimimo procese" (PDF). Res humanitariae (in Lithuanian). 5: 64–85. ISSN 2538-922X.
- Butkevičius, Algirdas (2001). "Kėlė dvasią, žadino gėrio ir grožio idealus" (PDF). Krantai. 4: 42–47. ISSN 0235-6384.
- Butkevičius, Algirdas (20 March 2018a). "Aušrininkas, poetas, vertėjas, pedagogas (1). Stanislovo Dagilio 175-osioms gimimo metinėms". Biržiečių žodis (in Lithuanian).
- Butkevičius, Algirdas (29 March 2018b). "Aušrininkas, poetas, vertėjas, pedagogas (2). Stanislovo Dagilio 175-osioms gimimo metinėms". Biržiečių žodis (in Lithuanian).
- Girdzijauskas, Juozas, ed. (2001). Lietuvių literatūros istorija: XIX amžius (PDF) (in Lithuanian). Vilnius: Lietuvių literatūros ir tautosakos institutas. ISBN 9986513693.
- Gudas, Petras (21 March 2023). "Stanislovui Dagiliui – 180 metų" (in Lithuanian). Šiaurės rytai.
- Kaunas, Domas (2009). Knygos kultūra ir kūrėjas: istoriografiniai tyrimai ir vertinimai (PDF) (in Lithuanian). Vilnius: Vilnius universiteto leidykla. ISBN 978-9955-33-364-7.
- Kulbokas, Vladas (October 1978). "Neiškreiptas Janonis". Aidai (in Lithuanian). 8. ISSN 0002-208X.
- Petkūnas, Darius (2019). "1942 m. "Ekumeninis" giesmynas ir jo įdiegimo sunkumai". Tiltai. Priedas (in Lithuanian). 49: 41–68. ISSN 1648-3979.
- Seibutis, Antanas (2008). "Lietuvos autorių skulptūros Biržų erdvėse". Krantai (in Lithuanian). 4: 46–51. ISSN 0235-6384.
- Tumas, Juozas (1924). Lietuvių literatūros paskaitos. Draudžiamasis laikas: Aušrininkų grupė (in Lithuanian). Kaunas: Julijos Stauskaitės leidinys.
