= Julius Janonis =

Lithuanian poet and writer

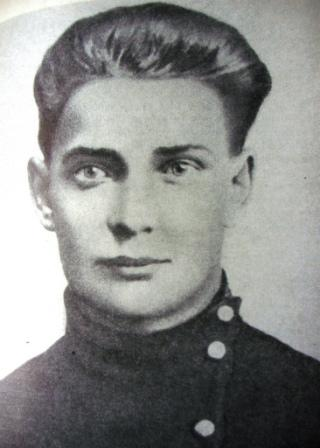
- Portrait
- Born: 4 April 1896; Beržiniai, Kovno Governorate, Russian Empire
- Died: 30 May 1917 (aged 21); Tsarskoe Selo, Petrograd Governorate, Russian Empire
- Occupation: Poet

Julius Janonis (4 April 1896 – 30 May 1917) was a Lithuanian poet and writer. Born to a family of poor peasants, he began writing and translating poems at the age of 14. Learning from Maironis, he wrote about nature and the suffering of the poor. His first poems were published in 1912. While still a student, he began contributing articles to Lithuanian press and joined activities of leftist aušrininkai.

He was a social-democrat but leaned more and more towards communism and his poetry became more and more political agitation. His views become even more radical when, during World War I, he evacuated to Voronezh and later Petrograd. He joined the Russian Social Democratic Labour Party (bolsheviks) and was imprisoned twice for revolutionary activities. He contracted tuberculosis and, unwilling to become a burden, took his life at 21. In the Lithuanian SSR, Janonis was hailed as the "first poet of the proletariat".

== Biography ==
=== Early life and education in Biržai ===
Janonis was born in Beržiniai near Biržai in the then Russian Empire. His parents were poor peasants and belonged to the Lithuanian Evangelical Reformed Church. In 1911, the family moved to the nearby Mieleišiai village where his parents rented 10 hectares (25 acres) of land. His mother was literate and taught her children basic reading skills. Janonis was gifted and so his parents sent him to a Russian-language primary school in Biržai in autumn 1906. His older siblings, brother Mykolas and sister Marija, did not attend school due to financial difficulties. The distance from home to school was about 13 kilometres (8.1 mi) and so he lived with a bell-ringer of the Evangelical Reformed Church. In autumn 1909, Janonis began classes at a four-year progymnasium in Biržai. According to his classmates, he was serious, quiet, kept mostly to himself, and was nicknamed Solomon for his intelligence. He always struggled financially; he received some help from his brother Mykolas and priest Povilas Jakubėnas, in addition to earning a few rubles by tutoring others. He also earned a little money by copying texts for Stanislovas Dagilis when he prepared a new hymnal for publication. Once, when Janonis could not afford proper shoes, his classmates collected enough money to buy him a pair.

Janonis began writing in 1910. He translated Latvian folk songs on poor orphans hired by local peasants as well as poems by Alexander Pushkin and Aleksey Koltsov. His first poems were published in 1912 in Jaunimas and Lietuvos žinios. He collected Lithuanian folk songs and sent them to the Lithuanian Scientific Society. At the time, there were two major camps of Lithuanian activist – more conservative Catholic ateitininkai and more progressive leftist aušrininkai. Janonis joined activities of aušrininkai with a group of students at his school that held informal gatherings, where they shared and discussed books and periodicals. In 1913, he attended a conference of aušrininkai organized in Šiauliai. Janonis also participated in cultural society Lyra that organized occasional folk theater performances.

=== Education in Šiauliai, Voronezh, Petrograd ===
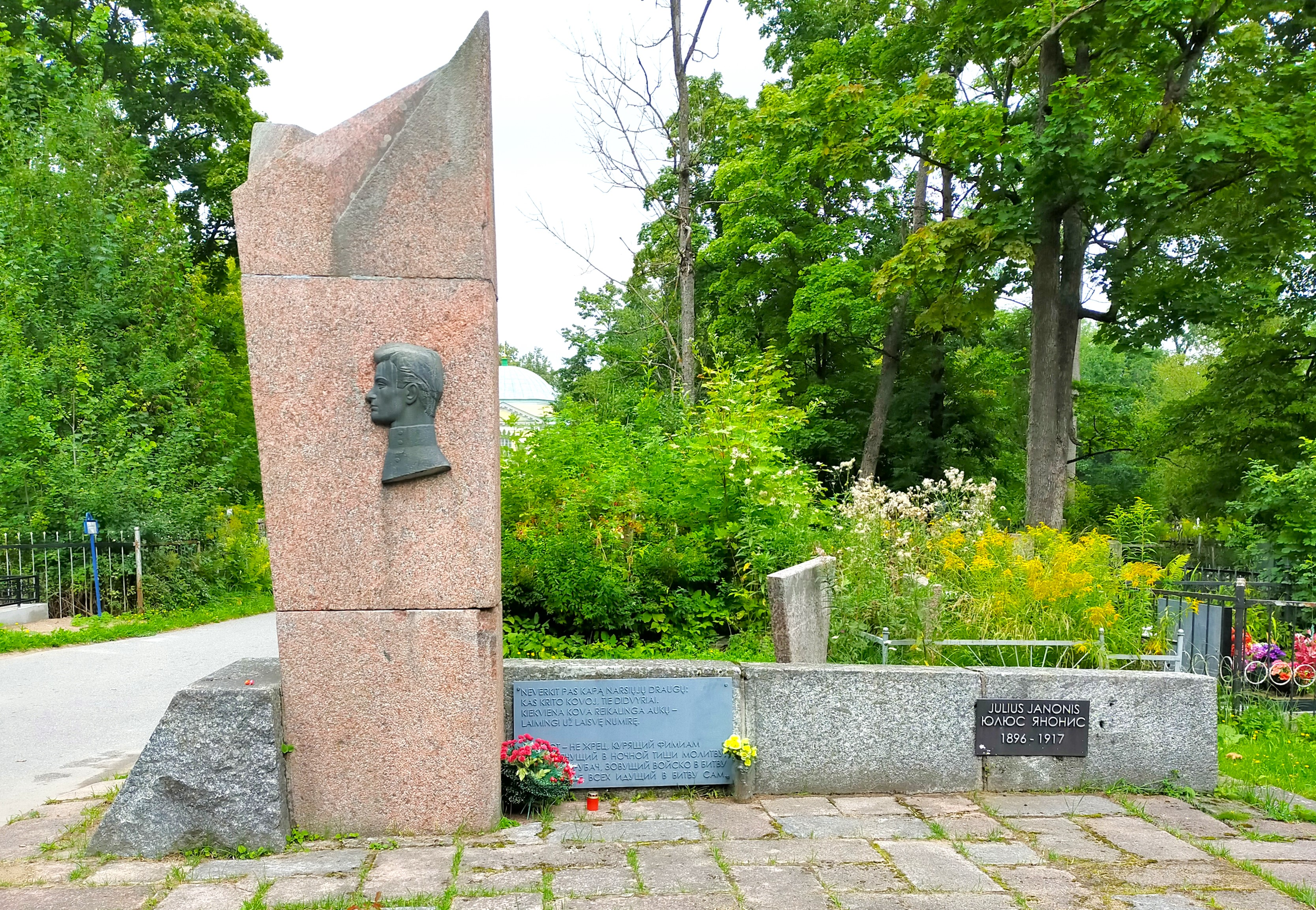
Tomb of Janonis in Pushkin, Saint Petersburg

With assistance from doctor Mykolas Kuprevičius and attorney Kazimieras Venclauskis and a small stipend from Žiburėlis, Janonis continued his education and aušrininkai activities at Šiauliai Gymnasium in 1913. He was a social-democrat but leaned more and more towards communism. He not only contributed articles to Vilnis, but also helped with its distribution in Šiauliai. According to memoirs of Karolis Požela, who later became a communist leader in Lithuania, during one of his visits to Mitau, Janonis delivered a lecture on the need of a socialist revolution to Lithuanian students at the Mitau Gymnasium, inspiring Požela. In 1914, he edited almanac Nauju taku (On New Path) which included works by Janonis, Vincas Mickevičius-Kapsukas, and Balys Sruoga.

World War I started in summer 1914, and cultural activities were curtailed. Janonis interacted with Russian soldiers and wrote anti-war works. On 15 April 1915, Germans captured Šiauliai and the gymnasium dispersed. Janonis evacuated to Vilnius and then Voronezh, where a special Lithuanian gymnasium was opened by Martynas Yčas. There, he was roommates with Butkų Juzė. Janonis was elected to the three-member presidium of aušrininkai organization and to the editors of its hectographed newspaper Sūkurys (Whirlpool). However, the organization did not support revolutionary socialism and Janonis left in protest. In early 1916, he departed to Petrograd.

In Petrograd, Janonis enrolled at the XII Gymnasium and joined the Russian Social Democratic Labour Party (bolsheviks). For the revolutionary work, he was arrested in December 1916 and imprisoned in the Kresty Prison. Released, he traveled to Tartu where he met with Karolis Požela and Vladas Rekašius. He took a train further south but once again was arrested and imprisoned in Vitebsk. He was freed after the February Revolution, but his health was failing. He returned to Petrograd where he lived with Zigmas Angarietis and worked on publishing Tiesa (Truth). He was a press correspondent at the 7th Congress of the Russian Communist Party (Bolsheviks). In spring 1917, he passed gymnasium graduation exams, but his tuberculosis was getting worse. Not wanting to be a burden, he took his own life by jumping in front of a train halfway between Petrograd and Pushkin. As a suicide victim, he was buried outside a cemetery in Pushkin. In the early 1960s, it was decided to rebury him at the center of the cemetery.

== Works ==
Janonis is known primarily as a poet. He learned poetry from older Lithuanian poets, primarily Stanislovas Dagilis (Janonis knew him personally) and Maironis. His early poems were about nature, personal feelings (e.g. his unrequited love, struggles to reconcile reality with ideals and unreachable life goals), and the suffering of the poor. Later, he became a political agitator calling for the removal of the current regime. According to literary critic Vytautas Kubilius, "he combined precise detail and concrete imagery with intense lyricism and the energy of strongly felt experience." Several of Janonis' poems were turned into songs by composers Mikas Petrauskas, Stasys Šimkus, Juozas Gruodis, Nikodemas Martinonis, Jonas Dambrauskas, and others. Janonis translated several poems from Russian, including Requiem ("Don't mourn dead fighters…") by Liodor Palmin, which became popular and was sung by the Lithuanian Riflemen's Union. In addition to lyric poems, Janonis also wrote short stories and feuilletons.

A small collection of his poems was first published in 1917 in Petrograd under the pseudonym Vaidilos Ainis. A year later, a larger collection was published by Vincas Mickevičius-Kapsukas in Voronezh. His collected works were published in 1921, 1941, and 1945 in Kaunas. A two-volume comprehensive collection of not only of his poems but also of his articles published in the press was published in 1957 in Vilnius. In total, Julius Būtėnas counted 28 publications of Janonis' poetry between 1945 and 1986.

== Legacy ==
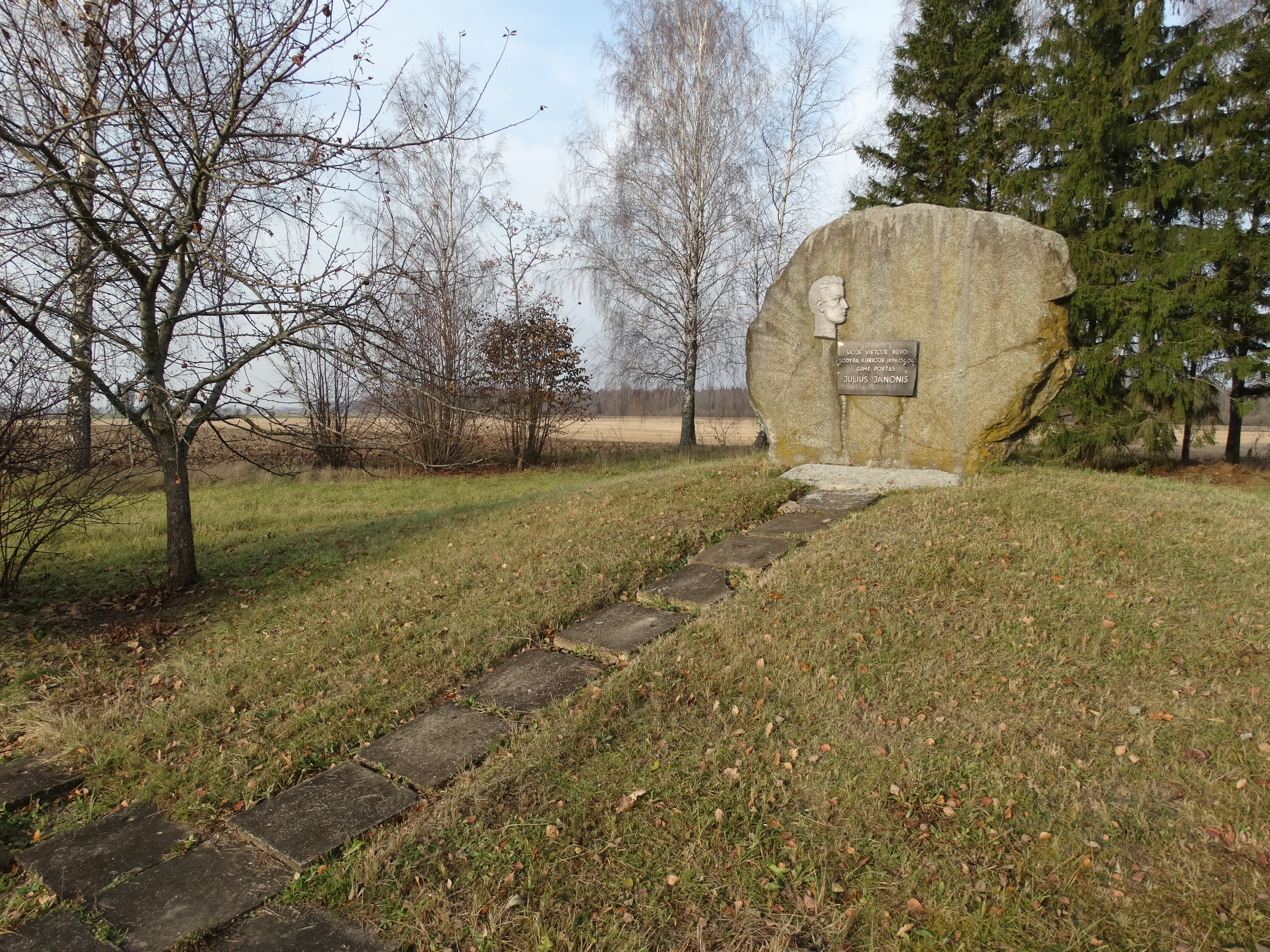
Memorial stone in Janonis' birthplace

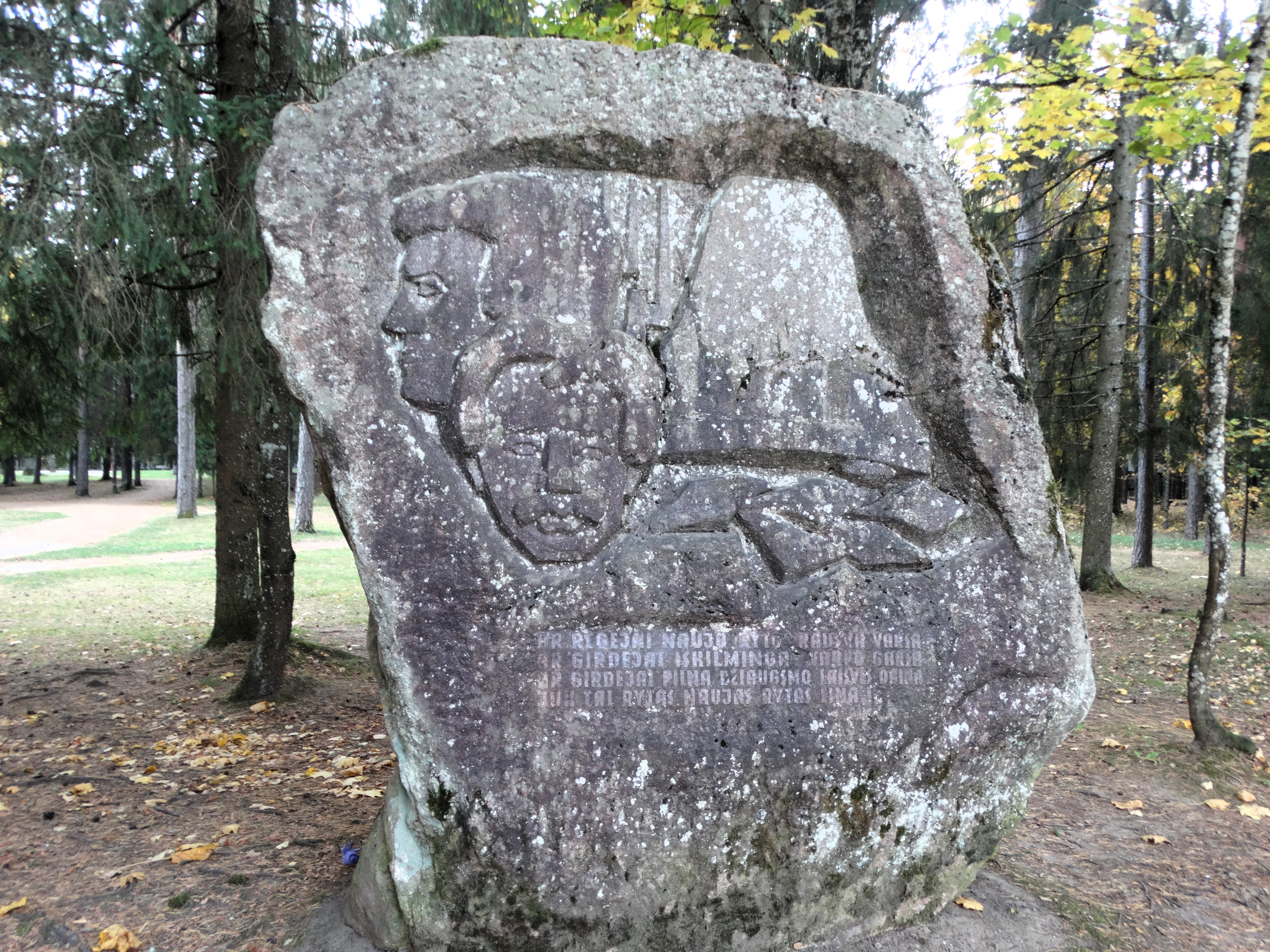
Stone with words from Janonis' poem in Tirkšliai

In the Lithuanian SSR, Janonis was hailed as the "first poet of the proletariat" and made into a Soviet hero. To suit Soviet needs, his biography was edited to remove undesirable elements (such as his religious beliefs) and emphasize revolutionary activities (such as his participation in various worker strikes and protests).

In 1946, Šiauliai Gymnasium was renamed to Julius Janonis High School. Since 1970, the school hosts a museum which, among other things, collects items related to Janonis. It also has a monument by sculptor Romas Kazlauskas. The monument depicts a highly stylized anvil with a brass bell – both elements taken from Janonis' poems written while he lived in Šiauliai.

Janonis' memory is also commemorated in Voronezh. There is a street named after him. In 1981, Voronezh Secondary School no. 73 (located on Janonis' street) established the Museum of Lithuanian Literature, Art, and Culture and named it after Janonis. A memorial plaque to Janonis was installed on the building of the Voronezh State Puppet Theatre in 1985.

In 1957, a play Pamilau dangaus žydrumą (I Fell in Love with the Blue of the Sky – the first line of the last poem written by Janonis) by Julius Būtėnas and Aleksandras Kernagis was staged at the Academic Drama Theater. Two years later, the Lithuanian Film Studios made a 94-minute film directed by Balys Bratkauskas and Vytautas Dabašinskas. In both the play and the film, Janonis was played by Henrikas Kurauskas. In 1974, the Academic Opera and Ballet Theatre staged opera Avė, vita by Vytautas Klova.

In 1973, a monument by sculptor Konstantinas Bogdanas was erected in the main square of Biržai and resembles a burning torch. An 8.5-metre (28 ft) high marble column is topped by a 6-metre (20 ft) high bronze sculpture of Janonis. The design was inspired by Bogdanas' mother who said that Janonis "burned down like a candle". Unlike monuments of many other communists, Janonis' was not removed after Lithuania declared independence in 1990. On occasion, the press publishes opinions for removing the monument, but it has been reinterpreted to represent youthful idealism and inexperience.
