= Marija Razmukaitė =

Lithuanian linguist (born 1941)

Marija Razmukaitė (born April 1, 1941) a Lithuanian linguist and researcher of Lithuanian onomastics.

In 1965 she graduated from the Vilnius University. During 1963–2009, she worked at the Institute of Lithuanian Language and Literature (now Institute of the Lithuanian Language).

== Awards ==
- 1993: Lithuanian Science Prize for the Dictionary of Lithuanian Surnames (co-authored with Aleksandras Vanagas and Vitalija Maciejauskienė
