= Freedom Monument (Kaunas) =

Monument in Kaunas, Lithuania

Coordinates: 54°53′58.7″N 23°54′40.6″E

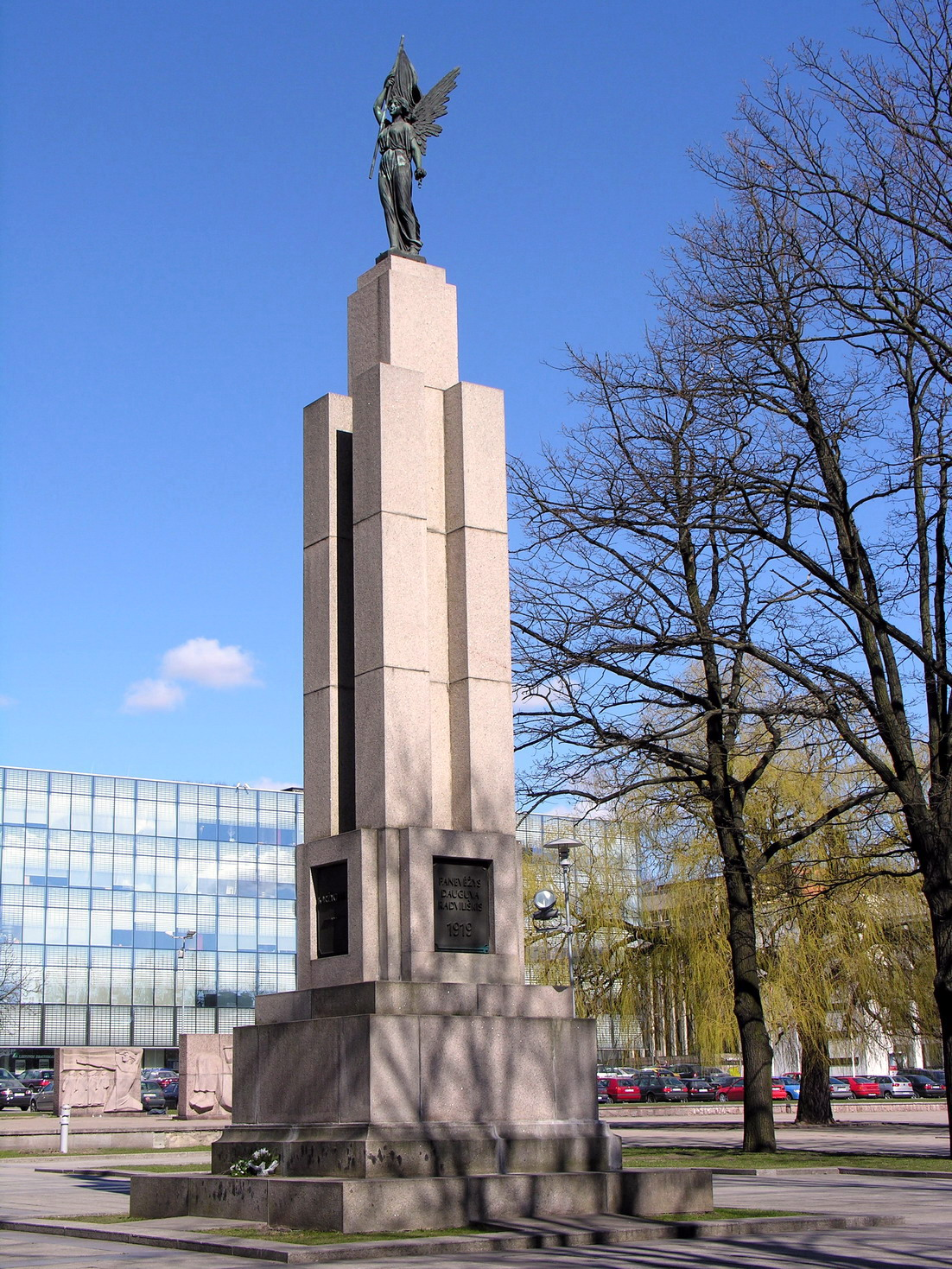
Freedom Monument

The Freedom Monument (Lithuanian: Laisvės paminklas) in Kaunas, Lithuania , by sculptor Juozas Zikaras, was unveiled in 1928 on the occasion of the 10th anniversary of the reestablishment of the independence of Lithuania. At that time, Kaunas was the temporary capital of the state. The statue of the monument is also pictured on the obverse of the Independence Medal, also designed by Zikaras and issued in 1928.

The statue was designed by Zikaras while he was a teacher at the Panevėžys Gymnasium. According to the caretaker of the Čiurlionis Museum , Rasa Ruibienė, Zikaras didn't have a workshop, so the director of the gymnasium, Jonas Yčas, former Minister of Education, allowed him to use a hall of the gymnasium. The reduced plaster copy of the statue was deposited at the Vytautas the Great War Museum in Kaunas.

Later, the statue was cast in bronze in Germany and inaugurated in its current location on the tenth anniversary of Lithuanian independence. The pedestal was designed by architect Vladimiras Dubeneckis.

In the summer of 1950, the monument was demolished by the orders of the Soviet government, and the damaged statue was transferred to the History Museum. In 1966, sculptor Bronius Petrauskas restored the statue, and it was stored in the Čiurlionis Museum. The monument was restored by architect Algimantas Sprindys and on February 16, 1989, was restored to its original location. The total height of the monument is 12,35 m.

The plaster copy, restored by Jonas Stanislovas Juodišius, is located in the White Hall of the Presidential Palace in Vilnius.

In 2000, the statue was once again featured on the Litas commemorative coin for the 10th anniversary of the second reestablishment of the independence of Lithuania.
