= Institute of the Lithuanian Language =

Lithuanian research institute

Coordinates: 54.6951°N 25.3054°E

- Lietuvių kalbos institutas
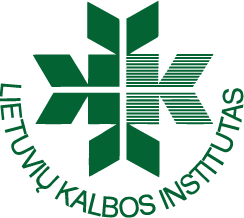

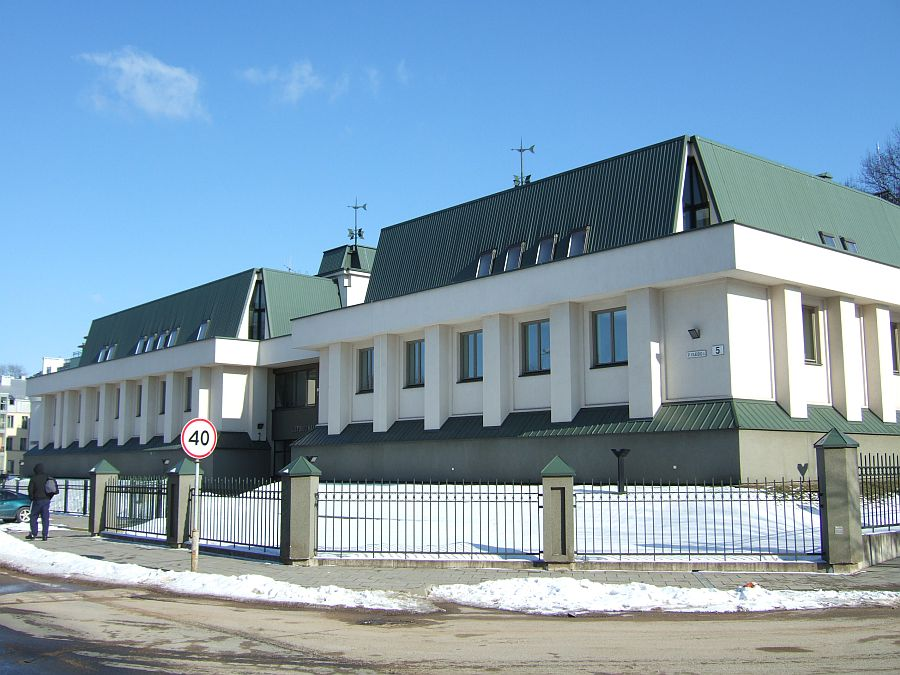
- Headquarters of the institute in Vilnius

State-funded institute overview
- Formed: 1941
- Jurisdiction: Lithuania
- Headquarters: P. Vileišio g. 5, LT-10308, Vilnius, Lithuania
- Employees: 85 (as of September 2024)
- State-funded institute executive: Albina Auksoriūtė, Director
- Website: lki.lt

The Institute of the Lithuanian Language (Lithuanian: Lietuvių kalbos institutas) in Vilnius is a state-funded research institute that focuses on research into the Lithuanian language. The Institute of the Lithuanian Language is a research establishment with longstanding traditions. Founded in Vilnius back in 1941 on the basis of the Institute for Lithuanian Studies of Antanas Smetona (which itself was founded in Kaunas in 1939 and relocated to Vilnius in 1940). Today it is a state-level research body of special national importance.

== History ==
The origins of the institute can be traced to the editorial commission Academic Dictionary of Lithuanian, founded by Professor Juozas Balčikonis in 1930. As an outgrowth of this commission, the Antanas Smetona Institute for Lithuanian Studies was founded in 1939. This institute's goal was to research the Lithuanian language.

After the Soviet occupation of Lithuania in 1941, the Antanas Smetona Institute for Lithuanian Studies and the Lithuanian Society of Science were merged into the Institute of the Lithuanian Language, within the greater framework of the Academy of Sciences. The Institute experienced difficulties during this period; a number of prominent linguists had emigrated, there was ideological pressure to employ Marxist language theory, and contacts with the international scholarly community were curtailed. In 1952 it was merged with the Institute of Lithuanian Literature. In April 1990 the Institute regained its status as an independent institution.

Since 2002 the Institute of the Lithuanian Language has moved to a building on P. Vileišis street. Currently, the Institute of the Lithuanian Language consists of six research centres and two non-research departments.

== Structure and activities ==
The Institute of the Lithuanian Language conducts scientific research on the standard Lithuanian language, Baltic languages and proper names, written heritage, geolinguistics, terminology and sociolinguistics; develops and fosters Lithuanian as a state language: addresses the issues of language standardization, performs linguistic expertise; participates in the formation of the strategy and tactics of the research and usage of the state Lithuanian language in Lithuania; organizes scientific expeditions for language data collection, accumulates Lithuanian language resources, compiles databases and manages their protection, development and use; in cooperation with the higher education institutions trains scientists of the highest qualification in the field of philology, organizes and hosts scientific conferences, promotes Lithuanian language and the results of its scientific research among the society.

Structure:

- Research Centre of the Baltic Languages and Onomastics
- Research Centre of Standard Language
- Research Centre of Geolinguistics
- Research Centre of Written Heritage
- Research Centre of Sociolinguistics
- Terminology Centre
- Lithuanian language museum Lituanistikos Židinys (Lithuanian Hearth)
- Bookstore
- Library

== Directors ==
- Pranas Skardžius – 1941
- Antanas Salys – 1941–1944
- Juozas Balčikonis – 1945–1952
- Kostas Korsakas – 1952–1984
- Jonas Lankutis – 1984–1990
- Aleksandras Vanagas – 1990–1995
- Albertas Rosinas – 1995
- Zigmas Zinkevičius – 1995–1996
- Algirdas Sabaliauskas – 1997–2000
- Artūras Judžentis – 2000–2001
- Giedrius Subačius – 2001–2003
- Elena Jolanta Zabarskaitė – 2003–2018
- Albina Auksoriūtė – since 2018

== Major publications ==
Academic Dictionary of Lithuanian (20 volumes), The Dictionary of the Modern Lithuanian Language, The Dictionary of Synonyms, The Dictionary of Antonyms, The Dictionary of Phraseology, The Dictionary of Comparisons, The Systemic Dictionary of the Lithuanian Language, the Dictionary of Lithuanian Polonisms, various monographs, atlases, and so on.
