= Aleksandras Vanagas =

Lithuanian linguist (1934–1995)

- Born: Aleksandras Vanagas; 12 August 1934; Buivėnai, Kupiškis Volost, Lithuania
- Died: 13 April 1995 (aged 60); Vilnius, Lithuania
- Citizenship: Lithuania
- Education: PhD
- Alma mater: Vilnius University
- Occupation: Linguist
- Years active: 1959-1995
- Employer(s): Institute of the Lithuanian Language, Vytautas Magnus University
- Known for: Baltic onomastics
- Notable work: Etymological Dictionary of the Lithuanian Hydronyms, Dictionary of the Lithuanian Surnames
- Awards: Lithuanian SSR State Award (1974), The Comandore Cross of the Gediminas' Order (1993)

Aleksandras Vanagas (August 12, 1934 – April 13, 1995) was a Lithuanian linguist, one of the leading Lithuanian etymologists.

== Biography ==
Aleksandras Vanagas graduated Vilnius University (Lithuanian language and literature studies) in 1959. Since then till the death he worked in the Institute of the Lithuanian Language, was its director between 1990 and 1995. Also, since 1990 he taught in Vytautas Magnus University (was the head of the Lithuanian language department) and Vilnius Pedagogical University. Between 1990 and 1992 he was the head of the Commission of the Lithuanian Language.

PhD since 1984, a member of the Lithuanian Academy of Sciences since 1990, a member of the Latvian Academy of Sciences since 1992.

== Works ==
The main research area of Aleksandras Vanagas was Baltic onomastics (hydronyms, toponyms, anthroponyms) and Baltic ethnogenesis. He guided many linguistic expeditions and collected onomastic data. Aleksandras Vanagas with his colleagues published the etymological dictionaries of the Lithuanian hydronyms and the Lithuanian surnames.

== Bibliography ==
- Lietuviški elementai baltarusių onomastikoje, Belarusian: Litoŭskija ėlementy ŭ belaruskaj anamastycy, 1968 (with Mikalaj Biryla)
- Lietuvos TSR hidronimų daryba, 1970
- Lietuvių hidronimų etimologinis žodynas, 1981
- Lietuvių hidronimų semantika, 1981
- Lietuvos TSR upių ir ežerų vardynas, 1963 (co-author
- Lietuvių pavardžių žodynas, 2 vol. 1985–1989 (with V. Maciejauskienė and M. Razmukaitė)
- Mūsų vardai ir pavardės, 1982
- Lietuvių vandenvardžiai, 1988
- Lietuvos miestų vardai, published in 1996 and 2004
