= Tatiana Committee =

Russian war-refugee relief organization

The Committee of Her Imperial Highness the Grand Duchess Tatiana Nikolaevna for the Temporary Relief of Victims of War (Russian: Комитет Ее Императорского Величества Великой княжны Татьяны Николаевны для оказания временной помощи пострадавшим от военных бедствий), commonly known simply as the Tatiana Committee (Russian: Татьянинский комитет), was a war-refugee relief organization during World War I in the Russian Empire. Organized in September 1914 and named after Grand Duchess Tatiana Nikolaevna, daughter of Emperor Nicholas II of Russia, the committee provided aid (food, clothing, shelter, etc.) to refugees and others affected by the war, organized schools and hospitals, provided grants to other charitable organizations.

It was the central refugee relief organizations in Russia until the establishment of the Special Council of Refugees (Russian: Особое совещание по устройству беженцев) on 30 August 1915. The Tatiana Committee was reorganized after the February Revolution in 1917 – it dropped Tatiana's name, announced elections to key posts, allowed refugees to represent themselves. The reorganized committee was known as the All-Russian Committee to Assist Victims of War (Russian: Всероссийский комитет для оказания помощи пострадавшим от военных действий). Deprived of its semi-official government status and state funding, the committee diminished significantly.

== Establishment and funding ==
Established on 14 September 1914 by an imperial decree, the committee took its name from Grand Duchess Tatiana Nikolaevna, the 17-year-old daughter of Emperor Nicholas II of Russia. The committee included 28 dignitaries from the Imperial Court and the State Council. It was chaired by state councilor Aleksei Neidhardt. Tatiana Nikolaevna was not just a patron of the committee, but also a participant – she attended meetings and dealt with paperwork. According to the memoirs of committee member Martynas Yčas, during the meetings Tatiana liked to draw caricatures of the committee members. Yčas and deputy chairman Vladimir Vasilyevich Nikitin wanted to publish an album of these drawings to raise funds for the committee, but plans were interrupted by the Russian Revolution.

The committee was initially funded by 900,000 rubles from Emperor's personal funds. It received further funding from the state – about 14 million rubles between July 1915 and 1 May 1917. It also raised money from donations, charity balls, raffles, auctions, and other fundraising initiatives such as selling postcards with Tatiana's image. For example, during the celebrations of Tatiana's birthday on 29–31 May 1915, the committee raised 2.2 million rubles. The committee's employees took no salary.

== Activities ==
Initially, the committee focused on helping war widows and soldiers' children, but it switched to assisting war refugees by the summer of 1915, providing them with food, clothes, and shelter. Newly arriving refugees were met at railway stations, registered, given food stamps and temporary shelter for 5–10 days, and then dispersed in provincial towns and villages. Other activities included reuniting separated families, establishing orphanages, schools, and hospitals, providing aid to non-refugees who had nevertheless suffered from the war, and providing grants to other local war-aid organizations. For example, the committee provided a 400,000-ruble grant to the Warsaw Citizens' Committee (later reorganized into the Central Welfare Council) and a 9,500-ruble monthly grant to the Lithuanian Society for the Relief of War Sufferers. The Tatiana Committee established numerous local branches: 66 at the provincial level and 220 at the uyezd and volost level by October 1915.

While the committee faced criticism that it was an establishment of the imperial regime, it undertook some novel initiatives to help the refugees. At the end of 1916, the committee distributed a detailed questionnaire soliciting feedback from the refugees. In spring 1917, it organized an exhibition of refugee handicraft in Petrograd to showcase that they were hardworking people, demonstrate and appreciate cultural differences, and tell stories of refugee plight. The committee also helped refugees fleeing the Armenian, Greek, and Assyrian genocides in the Ottoman Empire.

In its mission the committee competed with the All-Russian Union of Towns (VSG; Russian: Всероссийский союз городов) and the All-Russian Zemstvo Union (VZS). While they shared the same humanitarian goals, there were political tensions between the organizations, particularly when it came to registering refugees and gathering national statistics. The VSG and VZS, based on local self-government institutions of city dumas and zemstvos, were well suited for this task, but the central government did not trust them and delegated the task to the Tatiana Committee. By spring 1916, it counted more than 3.3 million refugees.
