= Lithuanian Society for the Relief of War Sufferers =

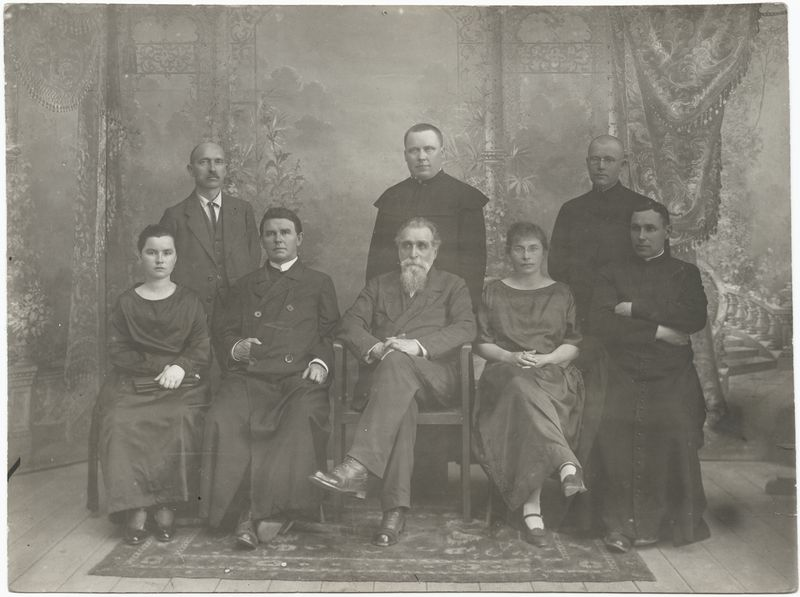
- Formation: 1914
- Dissolved: 1918
- Headquarters: Vilnius, Petrograd, Voronezh

The Lithuanian Society for the Relief of War Sufferers (Lithuanian: Lietuvių draugija nukentėjusiems dėl karo šelpti) was a Lithuanian charity organization that was active from 1914 to 1918. It was founded by various Lithuanian political figures as a committee to assist Lithuanian refugees of the First World War, gradually turning into an organization supporting Lithuanian education and independence.

== History ==
=== Origins ===
The organization was first established in August 1914 as the Lithuanian Provisional Committee for the Relief of Victims of War by the initiative of the Lithuanian political center, an unofficial organization of representatives of various Lithuanian political parties (except social democrats). The committee initially hosted more than 1000 refugees at the start of the war. As the number of refugees grew, it was renamed to the Lithuanian Society for the Relief of Victims of War.

=== Activity ===
The organization was initially centered in Vilnius, Lithuania. In 1915, up to 120 offices provided assistance for refugees, and the organization had up to 1600 members. The organization's activity was mainly headed by Martynas Yčas, a Lithuanian politician and member of the Russian Duma, as well as co-headed by future president Antanas Smetona. Finances for the organization were received from the Tatiana Committee, Russian relief organization named after Tatiana Romanov, the daughter of Tsar Nicholas II, as well as from various catholic and evangelical churches across Lithuania, the United States, and Russia. The organization established and maintained dormitories as well as feeding stations for refugees. When Vilnius was occupied by the German army in 1915 the organization split into two centers, one in Vilnius and one in Petrograd (from 1917 in Voronezh). In Russia, the organization set up orphanages for children and the elderly, schools, craft schools, as well as gymnasiums, teacher institutes, and also took care of Lithuanian students from universities abroad. They also printed Lithuanian newspapers, books, and textbooks.

The organization was the progenitor of various future Lithuanian conferences and councils. It was the first Lithuanian organization to defend Lithuanian interests abroad. After the October Revolution in 1917, the Bolshevik government accused the organization of hostile activities and closed it down, confiscating its property and imprisoning chairman Martynas Yčas for two months.
