= Juozas Balčikonis =

20th-century Lithuanian linguist and teacher

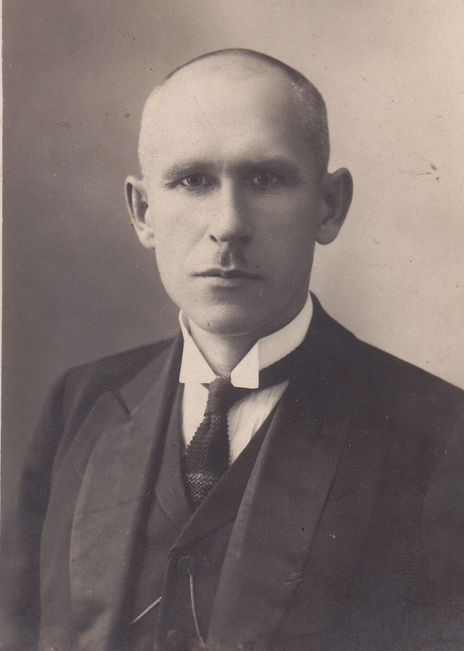
- Juozas Balčikonis in 1920
- Born: March 24, 1885; Ėriškiai
- Died: December 5, 1969 (aged 84); Vilnius

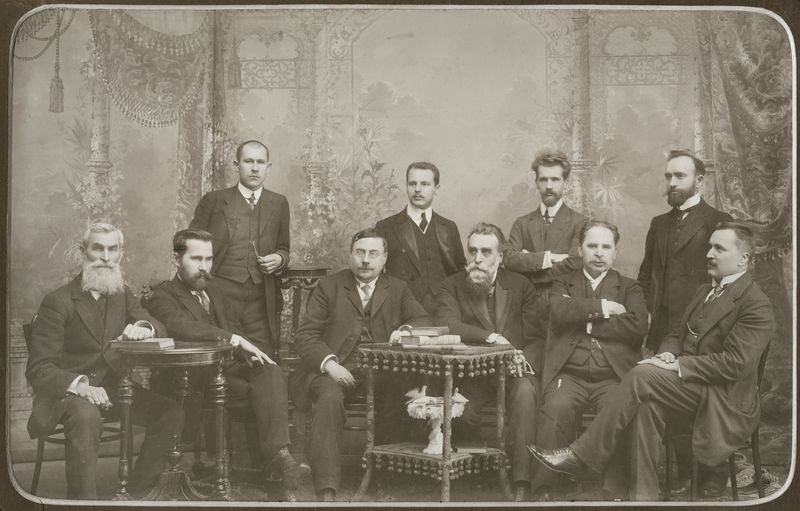
Committee of the Lithuanian Scientific Society, c. 1911. Sitting, from left: Juozas Kairiūkštis, Antanas Smetona, Augustas Niemi, Jonas Basanavičius, Antanas Vileišis and Jonas Vileišis. Standing, from left: Juozas Balčikonis, Zigmas Žemaitis, Mykolas Biržiška and Jurgis Šlapelis.

Juozas Balčikonis (24 March 1885 in Ėriškiai, Panevėžys District – 5 February 1969 in Vilnius) was a Lithuanian linguist and teacher, who contributed to the standardization of the Lithuanian language.
