= Povilas Jakubėnas =

Lithuanian Calvinist clergyman

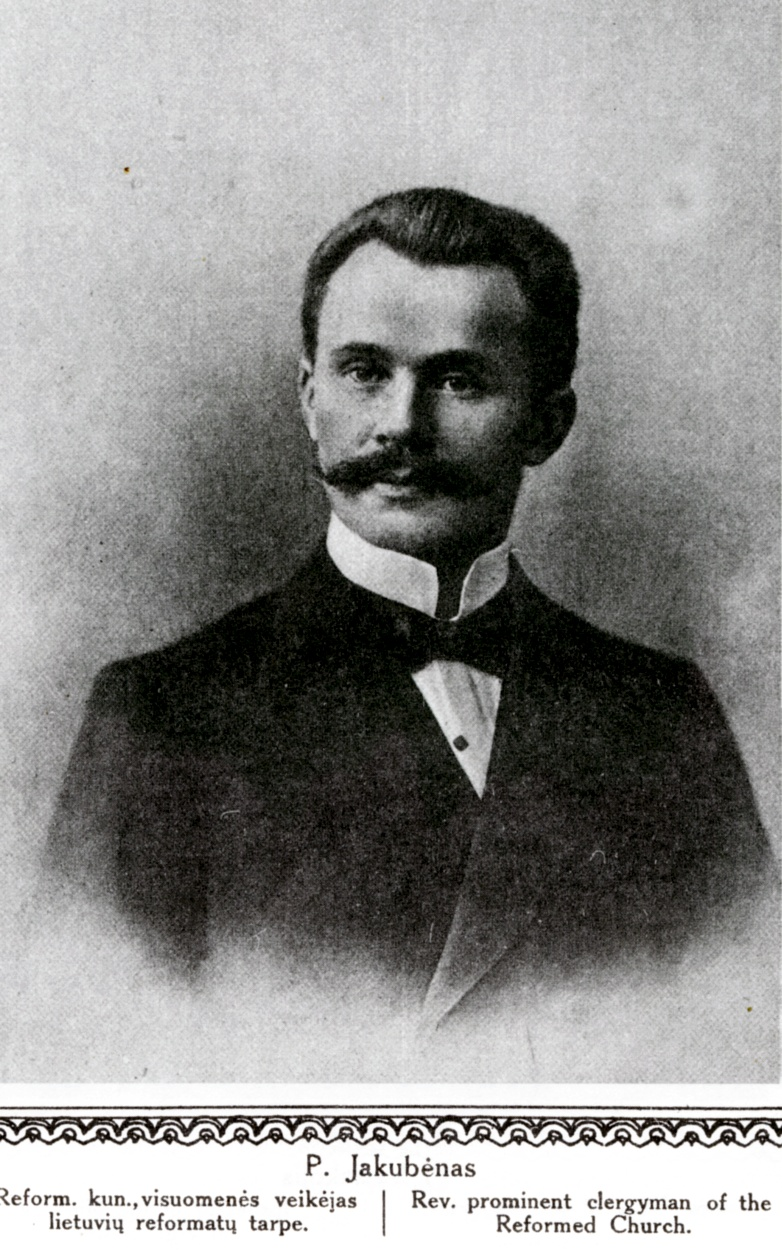

Povilas Jakubėnas (April 11, 1871 – May 30, 1953) was a Lithuanian Calvinist clergyman, general superintendent of the Lithuanian branch of the Reformed Church during the interbellum, professor of theology, Lithuanian book smuggler (knygnešys) during his student times.

In 1928 he was awarded with the Order of the Lithuanian Grand Duke Gediminas of II degree.

In 1941, upon the Soviet occupation of the Baltic States Jakubeans fled to the West, first to Germany, and eventually settled in Switzerland.
