= Arvi (given name) =

Estonian and Finnish male given name

- Gender: Male
- Languages: Estonian, Finnish
- Name day: 31 August

Origin
- Region of origin: Estonia, Finland

Other names
- Related names: Arved, Arvid, Arvo

Arvi is an Estonian and Finnish male given name.

People named Arvi include:

- Arvi Aavik (born 1969), Estonian wrestler
- Arvi Altmäe (born 22 July 1942), Estonian architect and rector
- Arvi Grotenfelt (1863–1941), Finnish philosopher and psychologist
- Arvi Hurskainen (born 1941), Finnish scholar of language technology and linguistics
- Arvi Kalsta (1890–1982), Finnish National Socialist
- Arvi Kontu (1883–1945), Finnish agronomist and politician
- Arvi Lind (1940–2026), Finnish television news presenter
- Arvi Mägi (born 1949), Estonian actor and theatre director
- Arvi Malmivaara (1885–1970), Finnish Lutheran clergyman and politician
- Arvi Parbo (1926–2019), Estonian-Australian business executive
- Arvi Pohjanpää (1887–1959), Finnish artistic gymnast
- Arvi Savolainen (born 1998), Finnish Greco-Roman wrestler
- Arvi Siig (1938–1999), Estonian poet, translator and journalist
- Arvi Tervalampi (1928–2005), Finnish equestrian
- Arvi Turkka (1894–1965), Finnish journalist and politician
