= Arvo =

- Gender: Male
- Languages: Estonian, Finnish
- Name day: 3 July

Origin
- Region of origin: Estonia, Finland

Other names
- Related names: Arvi, Arvid

Arvo is a Finnish and Estonian given name for males and may refer to:

- Arvo Aalto (1932–2025), Finnish politician
- Arvo Aaltonen (1892–1949), Finnish swimmer and Olympic medalist
- Arvo Aller (born 1973), Estonian politician
- Arvo Andresson (1954–1994), captain of MS Estonia
- Arvo Askola (1909–1975), Finnish track and field athlete and Olympic medalist
- Gus Hall (born Arvo Kustaa Halberg) (1910-2000) American Communist Party leader
- Arvo Haavisto (1900–1977), Finnish freestyle wrestler and Olympic medalist
- Arvo Horm (1913–1996), Estonian politician, economist and journalist
- Arvo Iho (born 1949), Estonian film director, cinematographer, actor and photographer
- Arvo Kraam (born 1971), Estonian football defender
- Arvo Kruusement (1928–2026), Estonian actor and film director
- Arvo Kuddo (born 1954), Estonian economist and politician
- Arvo Kukumägi (1958–2017), Estonian actor
- Arvo Linturi (1887–1975), Finnish civil servant and politician
- Arvo Mägi (1913–2004), Estonian writer and journalist
- Arvo Nuut (1941–2021), Estonian film operator and film producer
- Arvo Ojala (1920–2005), American actor
- Arvo Pärt (born 1935), Estonian composer
- Arvo Sainio (1921–1984), Finnish military officer and politician
- Arvo Salminen (1896–1967), Finnish Lutheran clergyman and politician
- Arvo Salo (1932–2011), Finnish writer, journalist and politician
- Arvo Sarapuu (1953–2020), Estonian politician and businessman
- Arvo Sävelä (1908–1976), Finnish politician
- Arvo Siikamäki (1943–2026), Finnish sculptor
- Arvo Tuominen (1894–1981), Finnish revolutionary, journalist and politician
- Arvo Turtiainen (1904–1980), Finnish writer
- Arvo Valton (1935–2024), Estonian writer
- Arvo Viitanen (1924–1999), Finnish cross-country skier and Olympic medalist
- Arvo Viljanti (1900–1974), Finnish historian
- Arvo Volmer (born 1962), Estonian conductor
- Arvo Ylppö (1887–1992), Finnish pediatrician
