= Coat of arms of Vilnius =

- The greater coat of arms of Vilnius

Versions
- The lesser coat of arms of Vilnius
- Armiger: City of Vilnius
- Adopted: April 17, 1991 (current version)
- Motto: Unitas – Justitia – Spes (Latin for "Unity – Justice – Hope")

The coat of arms of Vilnius is the official heraldic symbol of the city of Vilnius, the capital of Lithuania. It is also used as the emblem of the Vilnius City Municipality. The modern version was designed in 1991 by Arvydas Každailis, the same artist who created the current coat of arms of Lithuania. The design is based on the oldest seals of the Vilnius City Council, which date back to the 14th century.

== Description ==
The coat of arms of Vilnius depicts a silver figure of Saint Christopher carrying the Infant Jesus on his shoulder. The Infant Jesus is surrounded by a golden halo and holds a golden globus cruciger. Saint Christopher holds in both hands a golden pruned tree with silver branch nodes, topped with a double cross. He is shown crossing a river, beside which grow two small trees. The greater coat of arms of Vilnius is additionally adorned with supporters and a motto. On either side of the shield stand two allegorical goddesses – Unity and Justice – dressed in white and green garments. They support an oak leaf wreath tied with a ribbon in the national colors: yellow, green, and red. On the dexter side, the Goddess of Unity holds a bundle of fasces with an axe in her right hand. On the sinister side, the Goddess of Justice holds a golden scale in her left hand, with an anchor – the symbol of hope – placed at her feet. Below the shield is a ribbon interwoven with a golden cord, inscribed with the motto: Unitas – Justitia – Spes ("Unity – Justice – Hope").

== History ==
The image of St. Christopher carrying the Christ Child appears on Vilnius seals in the mid-15th century. Initially, St. Christopher held a staff topped with a double cross; at the beginning of the 16th century, it was changed to a trimmed tree. The first description of the coat of arms appeared in a privilege issued by Sigismund Augustus in 1568, in which he ordered that all municipal documents be confirmed with a seal bearing the image of St. Christopher, which had been used by the city council since ancient times.

The coat of arms was most likely granted to Vilnius by King Władysław Jagiełło in 1387, together with the granting of Magdeburg rights to the city. The double cross referred to the ruler’s personal coat of arms, while St. Christopher—meaning “Christ-bearer”—was intended to symbolize the Christianizing mission in Lithuania. According to legend, St. Christopher was a pagan giant who, after converting, carried pilgrims across rivers and actively spread the new faith, for which he suffered a martyr’s death. The granting of this coat of arms was meant to symbolically indicate Vilnius’s role in the Christianization of Lithuania.

In 1792, St. Christopher’s attribute was replaced with a lance, and later with a sword fastened at his side. In 1794, supporters in the form of goddesses appeared. After Vilnius was incorporated into the Russian Empire, the Russian double-headed eagle was placed above the coat of arms. With the abolition of Magdeburg rights, the city was granted a new coat of arms. On April 6, 1845, the emperor granted the city a variation of the Vytis: a silver knight on a red field, galloping over green ground, with an Orthodox cross on his shield. This coat of arms remained in use until the city was incorporated into the Polish state; in 1922, the coat of arms featuring St. Christopher was officially restored. After the Soviet occupation of the city, the coat of arms was abolished in 1940. It was officially reinstated on April 17, 1991, in an independent Lithuania.

== Gallery ==
Historical coats of arms of Vilnius

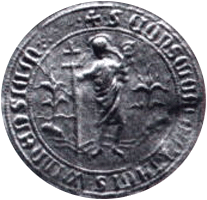
Seal of the Vilnius City Council in 1444-1568,

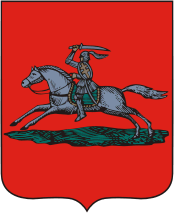
Coat of arms of Vilna from 1845

Coat of arms of Vilna from 1859

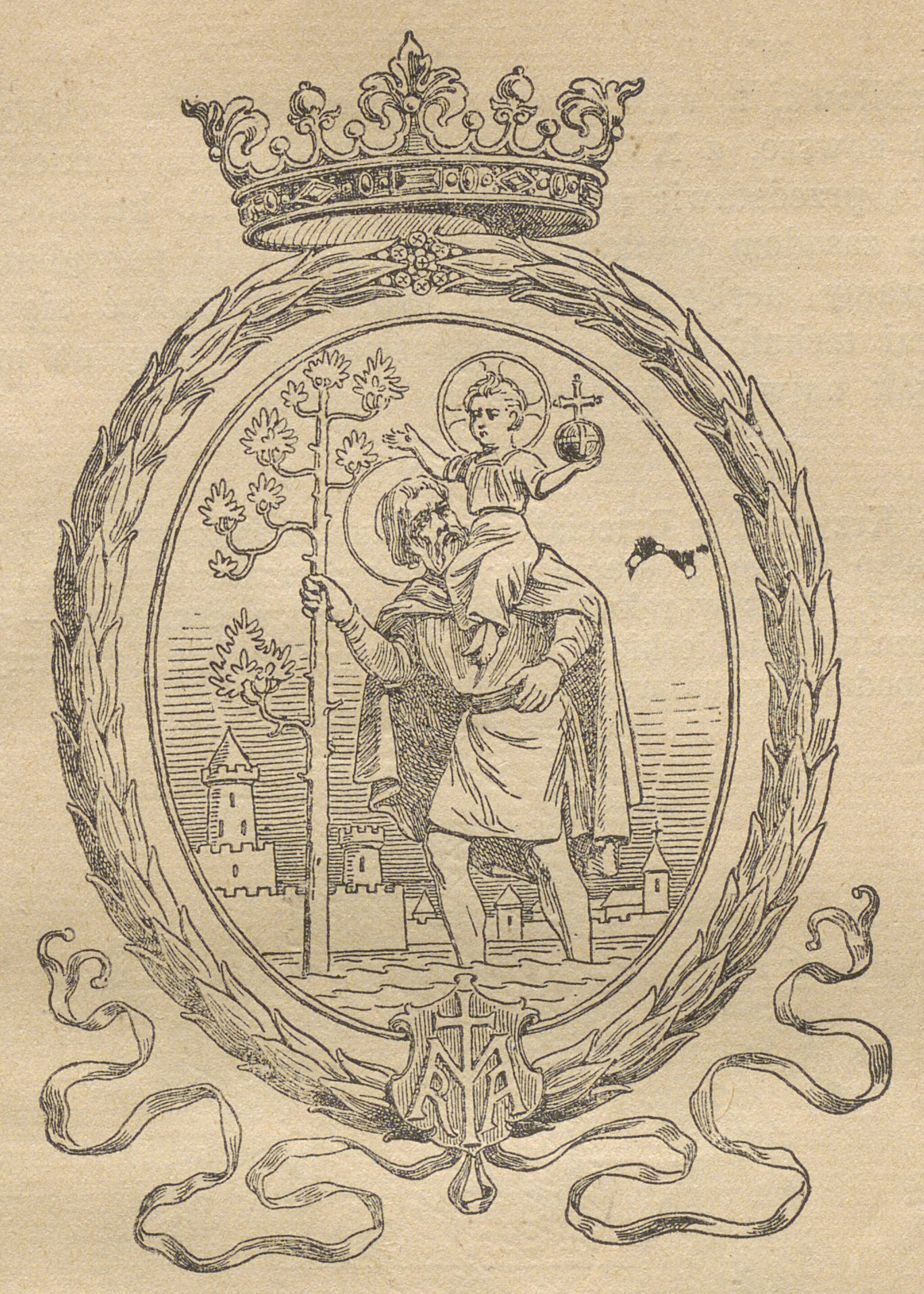
Coat of arms of Vilna by Tadeusz Jan Dmochowski (1910)

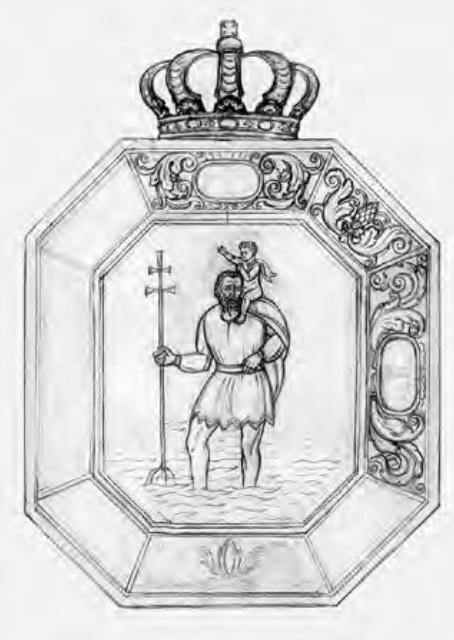
Coat of arms of Vilnius with crown (early 20th century)

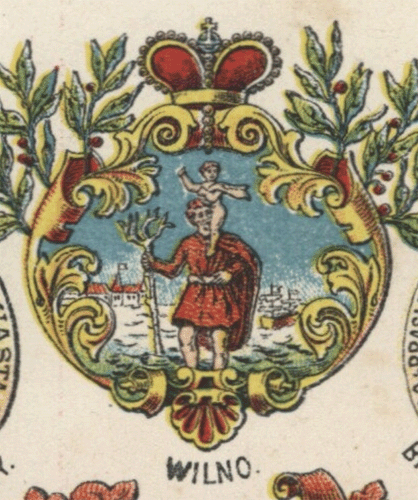
Coat of arms of Wilno on a 1920 postcard

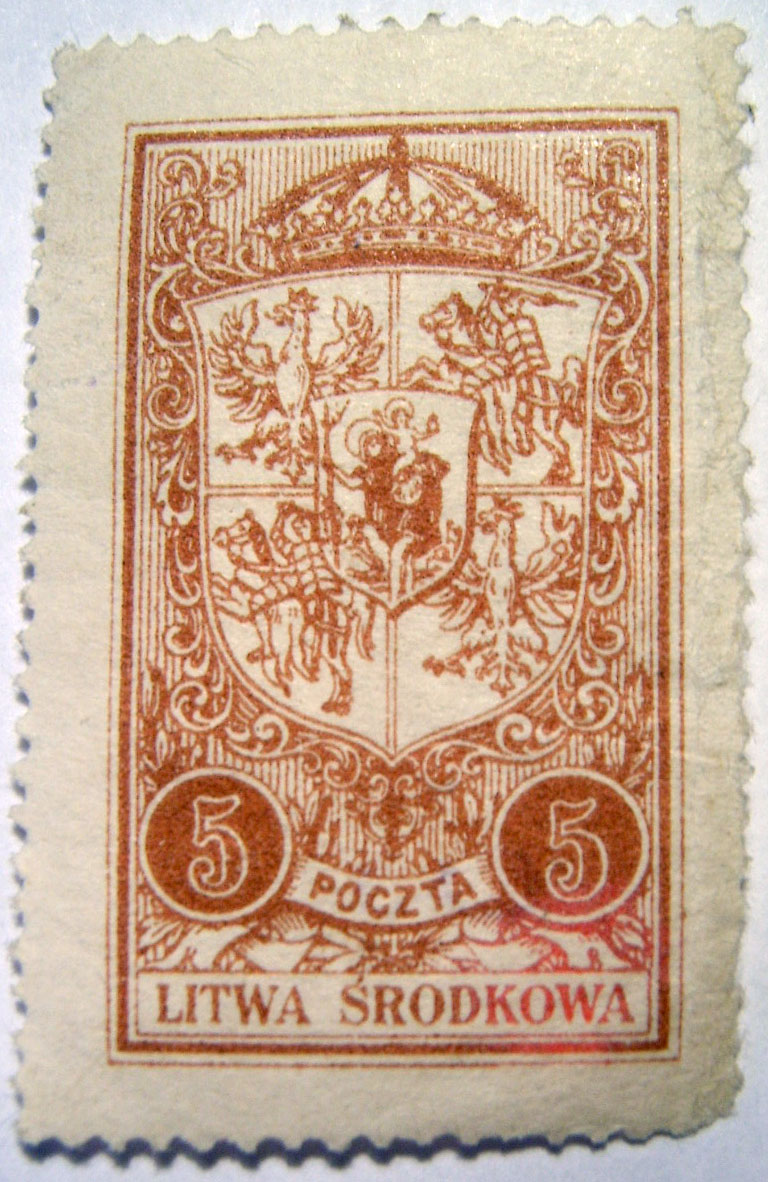
Coat of arms on a 1920 stamp by Republic of Central Lithuania

== Flag ==
The flag of Vilnius has the arms in the centre.

Flag of Vilnius

== Sources ==
- Rimša, Edmundas (1998). The Heraldry of Lithuania. baltos lankos. ISBN 9986-861-34-9.
- Rimša, Edmundas (2005). Heraldry: Past to Present. Translated by Vijolė Arbas. Versus aureus. pp. 163, 189. ISBN 9955-601-73-6.
- "Vilniaus herbas". Vilnius city municipality. Archived from the original on 2007-10-22.
- "What is the Coat of Arms of Vilnius?". Baol. Archived from the original on 2019-03-31.
