= Arvid =

Male given name

Arvid, Arved, Arnvid or Arvydas is a male given name, most common in Scandinavia but also in Iran and Lithuania. In Scandinavia it is derived from Old Norse Arnviðr and means "forest of eagles" or "eagle wood". Arvid is a royal male name that is composed of words with the meanings "king" and "legend". In Old Persian, Arvid is derived from Old Persian: 𐎠𐎼𐎡𐎹, romanized: Ariyaʰ + veid meaning "Aryan knowledge".

== People with the given name Arvid ==
- Arvid August Afzelius (1785–1871), Swedish pastor, poet, historian and mythologist
- Arvid Andersson (disambiguation), various Olympic Games competitors
- Arvid Auner (born 1997), Austrian snowboarder
- Arvid Boecker (born 1964), German painter and curator
- Arvid Carlsson (1923–2018), Swedish scientist and Nobel laureate
- Arvid Hallén (born 1950), Norwegian sociologist and researcher
- Arvid Hanssen (1932–1998), Norwegian journalist, newspaper editor, poet, novelist and children's writer
- Arvid Harnack (1901–1942), German jurist, economist, and resistance fighter in Nazi Germany
- Arvid Högbom (1857–1940), Swedish geologist
- Arvid Horn (1664–1742), Swedish soldier, diplomat and politician
- Arvid Järnefelt (1861–1932), Finnish writer
- Arvid Johanson (1929–2013), Norwegian newspaper editor and politician
- Arvid Jorm (1892–1964), Swedish painter and graphic artist
- Arvid Knutsen (1944–2009), Norwegian footballer and coach
- Arvid Kramer (born 1956), American professional basketball player
- Arvid Kurck (1464–1522), former Roman Catholic Bishop of Turku
- Arvid Lindblad (born 2007), British Formula One driver
- Arvid Lindman (1862–1936), Swedish rear admiral, industrialist and politician
- Arvid Lundberg (born 1994), Swedish ice hockey defenceman
- Arvid Nyholm (1866–1927), Swedish-American painter
- Arvid Pardo (1914–1999), Maltese diplomat, scholar and university professor
- Arvid Posse (1820–1901), Prime Minister of Sweden from 1880 to 1883
- Arvid Reuterdahl (1876–1933), Swedish-American engineer, scientist and educator
- Arvid Stålarm the Younger (c. 1540 or 1549–1620), Swedish noble and soldier
- Arvid Storsveen (1915–1943), Norwegian organizer of XU, the main intelligence gathering organisation in occupied Norway during World War II
- Arvid Taube (1853–1916), Swedish aristocrat, diplomat and politician.
- Arvid Trolle (c. 1440–1505), Swedish magnate and politician
- Arvid Wittenberg (1606–1657), Swedish count, field marshal and privy
- Arvīds Pelše (1899–1983), Soviet Latvian politician and government functionary
- Arvydas Sabonis (born 1964), President of Lithuanian basketball federation. Former famous basketball player, NBA hall of fame
- Arvid Söderblom (born 1999), Swedish professional ice hockey player
- Arvid Spångberg (1890–1959), Swedish Olympic bronze-medallist diver and bandy player

== People with the middle name Arvid ==
- PewDiePie (born 1989 as Felix Arvid Ulf Kjellberg), Swedish YouTuber
- Tore Arvid Asplund (1903–1977), Swedish-born American painter

== Fictional characters ==
- Arvid Engen, character in American sitcom Head of the Class
