= Northern Wars =

Series of wars in Northern Europe, circa 1600-1721

"Northern Wars" is a term used for a series of wars fought in northern and northeastern Europe from the 16th to the 18th century, primarily between the territorial rivals of the Swedish Empire, Tsardom of Russia, Poland–Lithuania, and Denmark–Norway. The Great Northern War is generally considered to have concluded the Northern Wars with the decline of Sweden and establishment of the Russian Empire as the principal power of the region, however there are different scholarly opinions on which war constitutes the First Northern War and an internationally agreed-on nomenclature for these wars has not yet been devised.

== Conflicts of the Northern Wars ==
Depending upon what date is chosen for the starting point, the Northern Wars comprise:

- The Russo-Swedish War (1554–1557), "First Northern War" according to Arvo Viljanti
- The Livonian War (1558–1583), "First Northern War" according to Klaus Zernack
  - The Northern Seven Years' War (1563–1570), "First Northern War" according to some Polish historians
- The Russo-Polish War (1654–1667), also known as the "Thirteen Years' War"; "First Northern War" according to some Russian historians
- The Second Northern War (1655–1660), "First Northern War" according to traditional English, German, Russian and Scandinavian historiography, in Poland known as Swedish Deluge
- The Great Northern War (1700–1721), also "Third Northern War" or "Second Northern War"

== See also ==
- Russo-Swedish Wars
- Polish–Swedish wars
- List of wars between Denmark and Sweden
- List of armed conflicts involving Poland against Russia
- Polish–Teutonic War
- Thirty Years' War, 1618 to 1648
- Early modern warfare

== Sources ==
=== Bibliography ===
- Frost, Robert I (2000). The Northern Wars. War, State and Society in Northeastern Europe 1558-1721. Longman. ISBN 978-0-582-06429-4.
