= Reuterdahl =

Reuterdahl is a surname. Notable people with the surname include:

- Arvid Reuterdahl (1876–1933), Swedish-American engineer, scientist, and educator
- Henrik Reuterdahl (1795–1870), Swedish Lutheran clergyman
- Henry Reuterdahl (1870–1925), Swedish-American painter
