= Arvydas =

Arvydas is a masculine Pre-Christian Lithuanian name. It is a dithematic name with stems ar-, usually associated with the meaning "also, too" and -vid/vyd- "to see" (a common Indo-Eropean stem; cf. išvysti, видеть, "vision"). Notable people with the name include:

- Arvydas Bagdžius, Lithuanian painter
- Arvydas Bajoras (born 1956), Lithuanian politician
- Arvydas Janonis, a retired football player
- Arvydas Každailis, Lithuanian graphic artist
- Arvydas Kostas Leščinskas, Lithuanian politician
- Arvydas Macijauskas, basketball player
- Arvydas Novikovas, football player
- Arvydas Pocius, Chief of Defence of Lithuania
- Arvydas Sabonis, a retired basketball player
- Arvydas Šikšnius, basketball player
