= Coat of arms of Lithuania =

- Armiger: Grand Duchy of Lithuania, Republic of Lithuania
- Adopted: Early 15th century (as the arms of the Grand Duchy of Lithuania); 20 March 1990 (restored); 4 September 1991 (current design)
- Shield: Gules, an armoured knight armed cap-à-pie mounted on a horse salient holding in his dexter hand a sword Argent above his head. A shield Azure hangs on the sinister shoulder charged with a double cross Or. The horse saddles, straps, and belts Azure. The hilt of the sword and the fastening of the sheath, the stirrups, the curb bits of the bridle, the horseshoes, as well as the decoration of the harness, all Or.
- Earlier version
- Use: Coat of arms of Lithuania from 1990 to 1991

The coat of arms of Lithuania features an armoured knight on horseback, wielding a sword and carrying a shield with a Jagiellonian cross. This emblem is known in Lithuanian as Vytis (pronounced ['vîːtɪs]). Historically, the emblem has also been known as Pogoń in Polish and Пагоня (Pahonia) in Belarusian.

The mounted rider first appeared on the seals of Lithuanian rulers in the late 14th century. Initially used as a personal and dynastic emblem, it became established as the coat of arms of the Grand Duchy of Lithuania during the reign of Grand Duke Vytautas the Great in the early 15th century. It remained the principal emblem of the Grand Duchy until 1795 and was displayed alongside the Polish White Eagle in the arms of the Polish–Lithuanian Commonwealth.

The emblem was adopted by the restored Republic of Lithuania in 1918 and suppressed following the Soviet occupation in 1940. It was restored in 1990, and the present design, created by Arvydas Každailis, was approved on 4 September 1991. Article 15 of the Constitution of Lithuania states that "the Coat of Arms of the State shall be a white Vytis on a red field".

== Names and etymology ==
In early heraldry, a knight on horseback is usually depicted as ready to defend himself and is not yet called Vytis. It is unknown for certain what Lithuania's coat of arms was initially called.

=== Lithuanian language ===
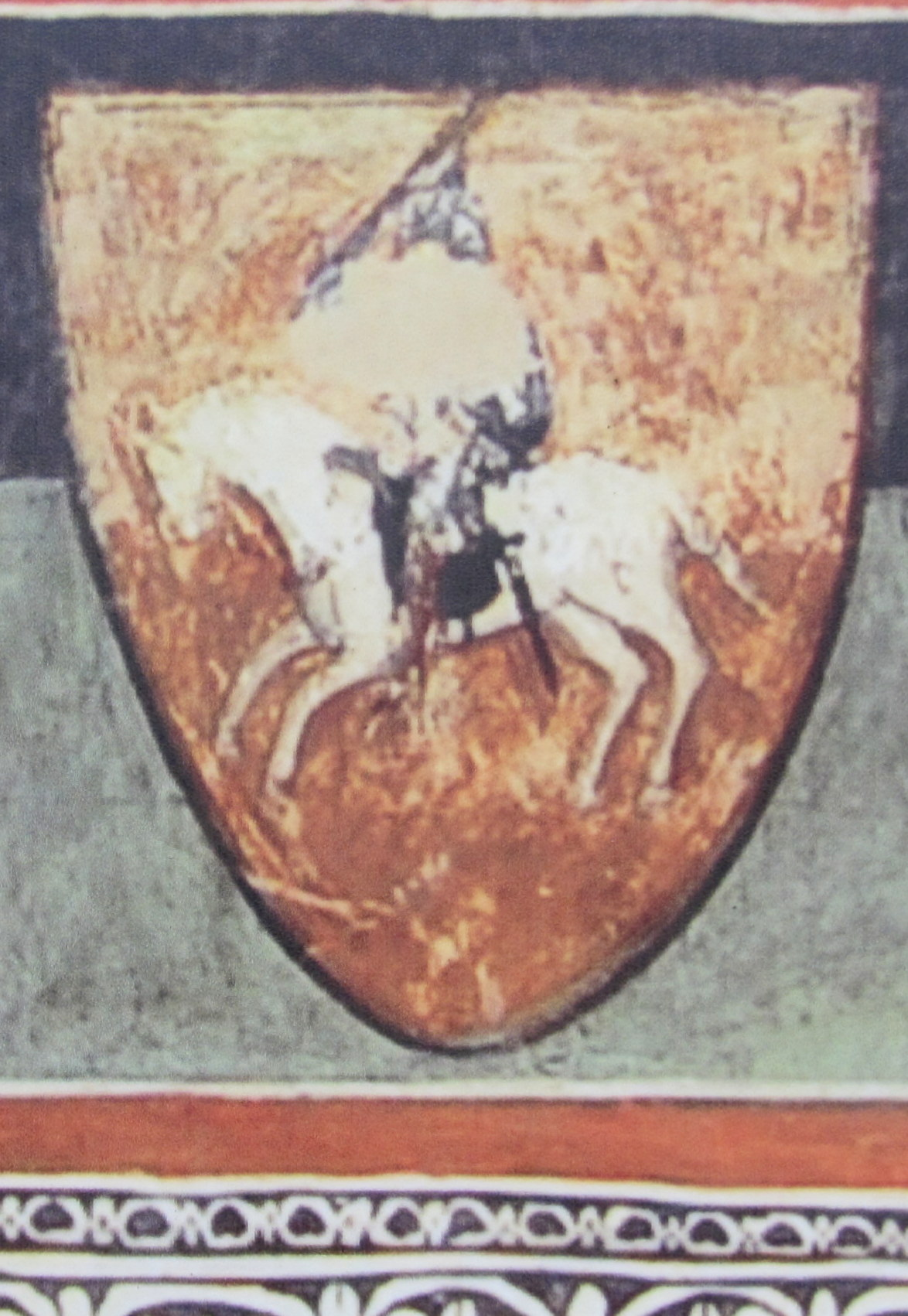
One of the earliest colour depictions of Vytis, 14th century

The origins of the Lithuanian proper noun Vytis remain uncertain. Simonas Daukantas first used vytis for the knight, rather than the coat of arms, in his 1846 work Budą Senowęs Lietuwiû kalneniu ir Żemaitiû. The term has been interpreted either as a Lithuanian equivalent of Polish Pogoń, as a noun derived from vyti ("to chase"), or, less plausibly, as a borrowing from East Slavic vityaz ("knight"). Vityas is ultimately derived from Old High German Witing.

The first theory, proposed by linguist Pranas Skardžius in 1937, was challenged by Leszek Bednarczuk, as pogoń does not have a recorded meaning of a "chasing knight." Lithuanian language features personal names with the root -vyt-, such as Vytenis, and the noun vytis follows a morphological pattern typical for verb-derived nouns According to Bednarczuk, Old Lithuanian had a word vỹtis (genitive vỹčio), meaning "run, chase, pursuit, or general levy," which, at the time the coat of arms was adopted by the Grand Duchy of Lithuania, was translated into Polish and Ruthenian. Daukantas accurately reconstructed the word's form from the verb výti, but misinterpreted its meaning, an error followed by later authors.

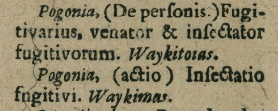
Name Waykimas in a dictionary by Konstantinas Sirvydas, 1677 edition

In the 17th century, in his Polish–Latin–Lithuanian dictionary, Konstantinas Sirvydas translated the Polish word Pogonia—in the sense of a person doing the chasing—into Lithuanian as Waykitoias, and in the sense of the act of chasing as Waykimas. In modern Lithuanian orthography, Waykimas is rendered as Vaikymas, and today it is sometimes proposed as the earliest known Lithuanian-language name for the coat of arms of Lithuania. In the multilingual poetry collection Universitas lingvarum magno Palaemonii orbis et urbis hospiti, published by Vilnius University in 1729, the Lithuanian coat of arms is referred to in Lithuanian as the "Horse of Palemon" (Zyrge Palemona). Waykimas was also used into the 19th century, together with another Lithuanian name – Pagaunia.

In 1884, Mikalojus Akelaitis referred to the coat of arms of Lithuania itself as Vytis in the Aušra newspaper. The name quickly gained popularity and was eventually adopted as the official term in the independent Republic of Lithuania. Originally used in the first person singular dative case as Vytimi, by the 1930s the form Vyčiu had become standard in the same grammatical case.

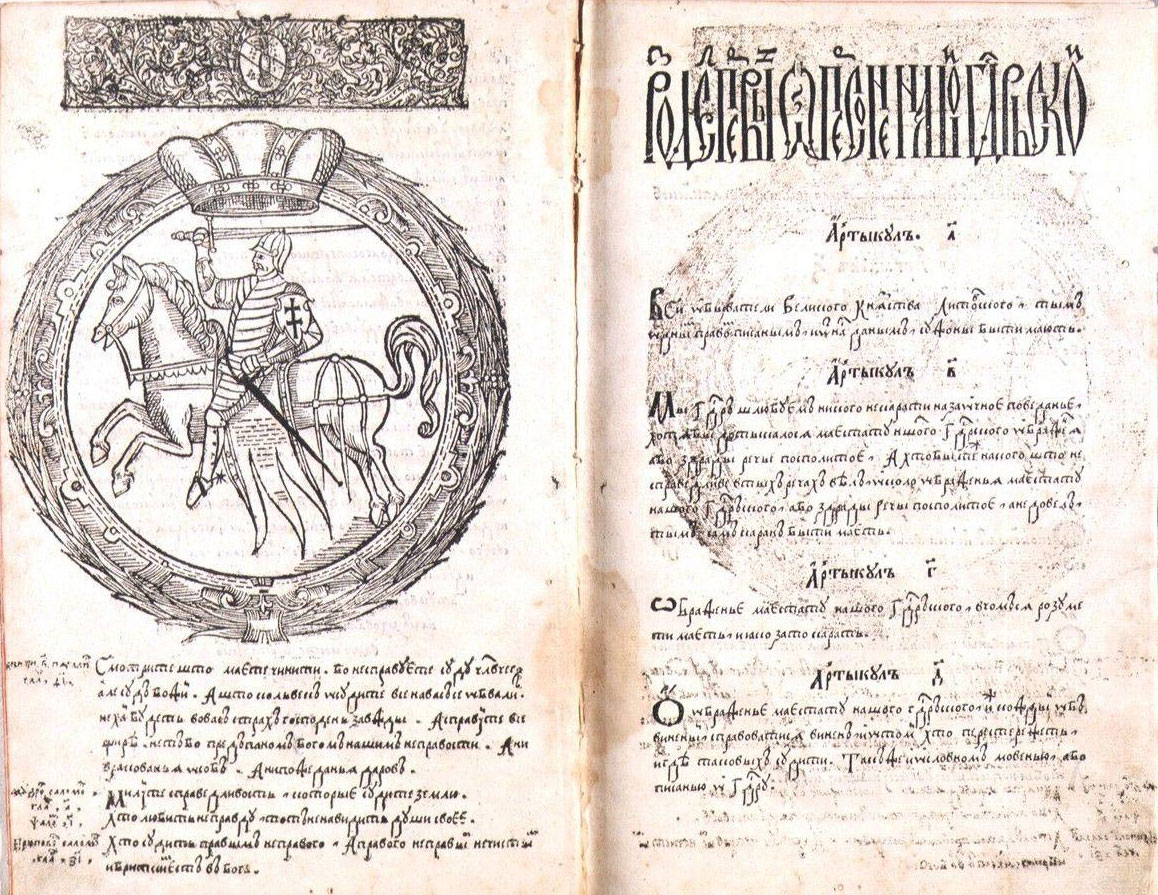
The Third Statute of Lithuania of 1588, featuring Vytis

=== Slavic languages ===
The words pogoń and pogonia have been attested in Polish since the 14th century, originally meaning "pursuit" or the legal obligation to chase a fleeing opponent. It was not until the 16th century that the term began to be used to describe an armed horseman.

The word entered heraldic usage in 1434, when King Władysław II granted a coat of arms bearing the name Pogonya to Mikołaj, the mayor of Lelów. The design depicted a hand wielding a sword emerging from a cloud. Given its resemblance to the Lithuanian royal coat of arms, it is possible that this was an abatement—a simplified or modified version—of the ruler's own arms.

The term pogonia to refer specifically to the Lithuanian coat of arms first appeared in Marcin Bielski's chronicle, published in 1551. However, Bielski made an error: while describing the Lithuanian arms, he actually referred to a Polish noble coat of arms, writing, "From this custom the Lithuanian principality uses Pogonia as its coat of arms, that is, an armed hand bearing a bare sword." The term gradually became established with the spread of the Polish language and culture. Pogonia is also found in Prince Roman Sanguszko's documents from 1558 and 1564.

The emblem was described a century earlier. In a document issued by Supreme Duke Władysław III, confirming the rights of the Czartoryski family, descendants of Karijotas, to use their ducal seal (Latin: sigillo eorum ducali frui, quo ex avo et patre ipsorum uti consueverunt, scilicet equo, cui subsidet vir armatus, gladium evaginatum in manu tenens; English: to enjoy their duke's seal, which they were accustomed to use from their grandfather and father, namely, a horse on which sits an armed man, holding a drawn sword in his hand). Similar descriptions are found in Jan Długosz's Annales seu cronicae incliti Regni Poloniae or the early 16th-century Bychowiec Chronicle. Another popular Polish term was pogończyk.

The name Pogonia was first recorded legally in the Third Statute of Lithuania in 1588.

== History ==
=== Early Lithuanian emblems ===
The 16th-century Lithuanian Chronicles attributed the mounted knight emblem to the legendary Grand Duke Narimantas, describing an armed rider on a white horse against a red field and associating the image with the name "погоня" (pohonia). A slightly later edition of the chronicle, so-called Bychowiec Chronicle, tells a similar story, without mentioning coat of arms name: "when Narimantas took the throne of the Grand Duke of Lithuania, he handed his Centaur coat of arms to his brothers and made a coat of arms of a rider with a sword for himself. This coat of arms indicates a mature ruler capable of defending his homeland with a sword". This legendary account was repeated by later chroniclers and heraldists, including Augustinus Rotundus, Maciej Stryjkowski, and Bartosz Paprocki.

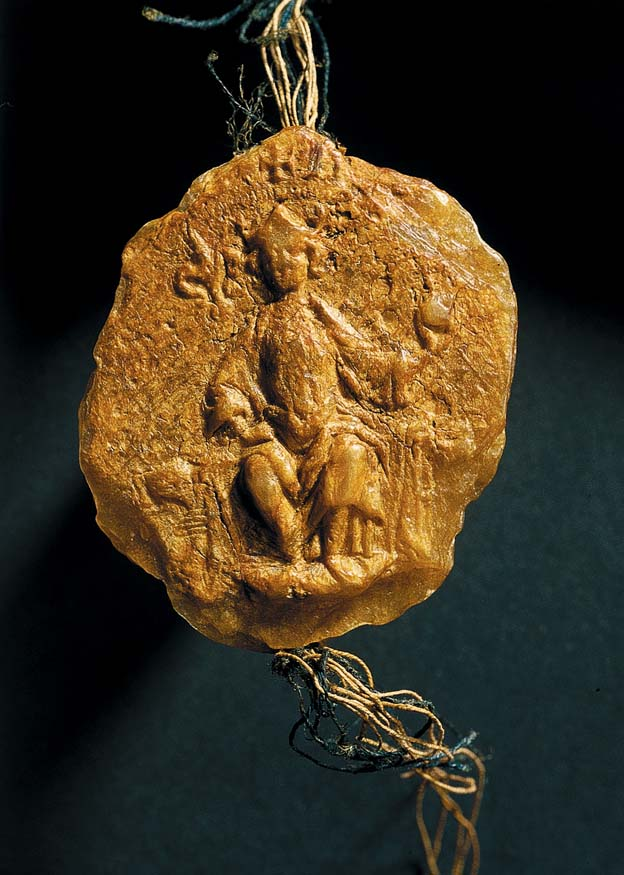
Seal of Mindaugas

However, there is no historical or archaeological evidence to support this legend. The symbols used by the earliest rulers of Lithuania remain unknown. One of the few relics that have survived to our times is the seal of Mindaugas, depitcing him as crowned ruler sitting on a throne with a scepter and orb in his hands. However the authenticity of a partially survived seal, attached to the act of 1255, according to which Selonia was transferred to the Livonian Order, is disputed. Symbols used by Mindaugas's successors have not survived, if they ever existed. The appearance of Gediminas' seal is known from a description made by a notary who copied three of the letters sent by Gediminas to recipients in Saxony in 1323. According to the notary's transcript, the oval seal of Gediminas had a twelve-sided border, at the middle of the edging was an image of a man with long hairs, who sat on a throne and held a crown (or a wreath) in his right hand and a sceptre in his left hand, moreover, a cross was engraved around the man along with a Gediminas' title in Latin.

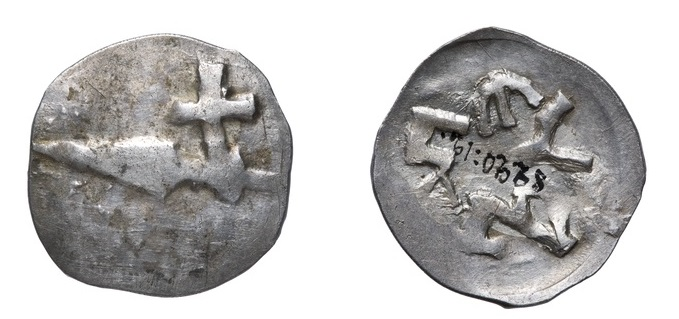
Early Lithuanian coin with a joint symbol of a spearhead and a cross that was minted by Jogaila, Vytautas, and possibly Algirdas or Skirgaila

Late 14th-century Lithuanian coinage developed following the Christianization of Lithuania in 1387, when Jogaila established systematic minting in Vilnius. Successive issues, reflecting the emergence of a distinct Lithuanian coinage, featured various figures. There were: the Lion and Eagle type (1387), the Regina type (c. 1388–1390), a Lion and the Double Cross type (c. 1390–1392), a Horseman and the Double Cross type (c. 1392–1394/95), and finally the Double Cross and a Spearhead type (from c. 1395). Separate coinage was also issued by the dukes of Trakai: Skirgaila minted coins bearing a Lion and Star from c. 1388, while Vytautas subsequently issued the so-called Pečat' type (featuring a Spear with a Cross and a Cyrillic circumscription Pečat' meaning "seal"), probably at Kaunas, until gaining influence over the grand-ducal mint around 1394–1395. These issues formed part of a broader transition from the earlier regional coinages of Ruthenian Gediminid princes towards a more centralized Lithuanian monetary system.

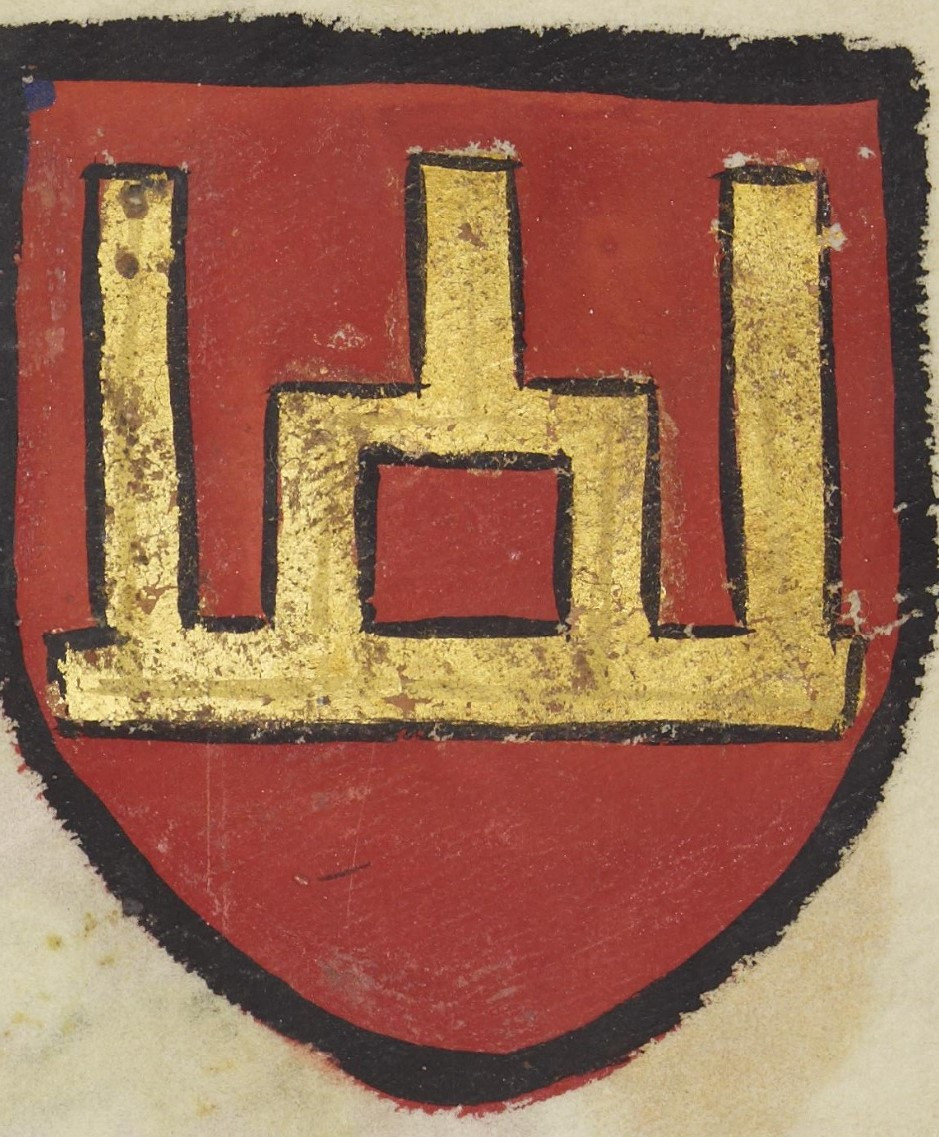
Columns of Gediminas, one of the coats of arms of Lithuania, painted in 1416

The Columns of Gediminas are one of the earliest surviving Lithuanian heraldic symbols, are first securely attested as the emblem of Vytautas the Great in 1397 and were subsequently used by the Gediminids, becoming a dynastic symbol under Casimir IV Jagiellon. Usually depicted in gold on a red field, the Columns were widely used in the Grand Duchy of Lithuania on coins, banners, seals, military equipment, church objects, and other insignia, often alongside the mounted knight. After the extinction of the male Jagiellonian line in 1572, they remained in use as a secondary emblem of the Grand Duchy.

=== Knight on horseback ===
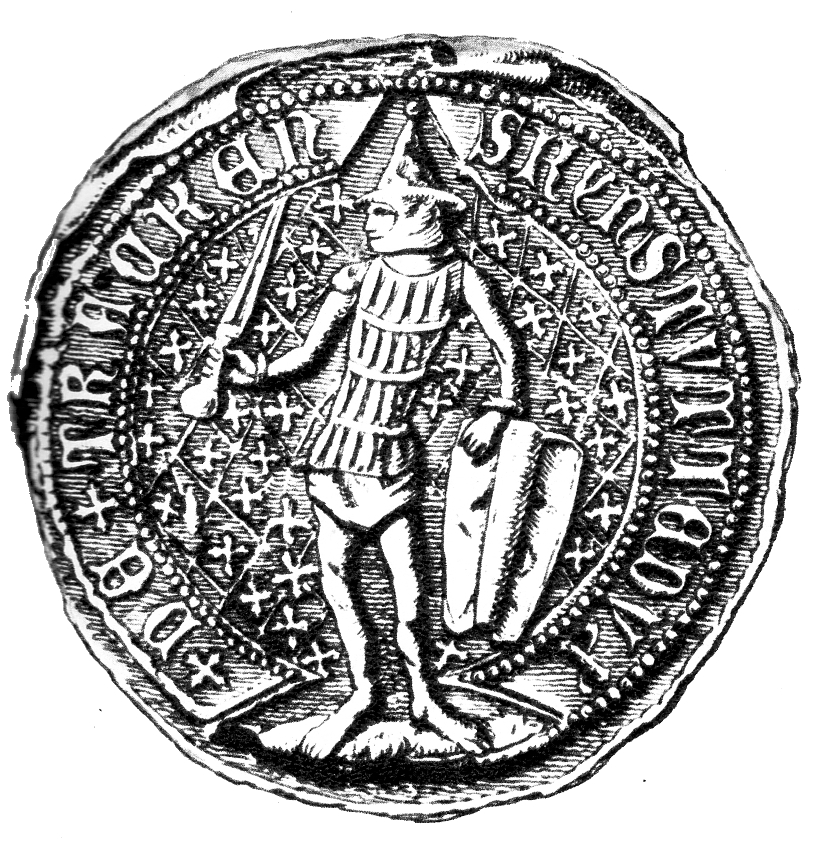
Authentic Seal of Duke Kęstutis with Latin words

The Lithuanian arms developed from equestrian images on rulers' seals. Algirdas was probably the first ruler to use a seal with a depiction of himself on horseback. The seal, which was attached to the Polish–Lithuanian treaty of 1366, wasn't preserved, and we know its appearance only thanks to historian Tadeusz Czacki who claimed to have seen the seal. The oldest preserved such seal is Jogaila's seal used between 1377 and 1380, when he became Grand Duke of Lithuania. Duke of Kernavė Vygantas' seal of 1388 is the earliest surviving example in which the mounted knight appears on a heraldic shield. Jogaila and other Algirdas sons: Skirgaila, Lengvenis, Kaributas, Vygantas, and Švitrigaila all were using seals with a horseman-type images. The horseman was chosen due to at the time flourishing culture of knighthood in Europe. At first, the charging knight was depicted riding to left or right, and holding a lance instead of the sword: two seals of Lengvenis of 1385 and of 1388 exhibit this change. Initially Kęstutis and his son Vytautas were depicted on their seals as standing warriors. Only later Vytautas adopted, like other Lithuanian dukes, the image of a riding knight.

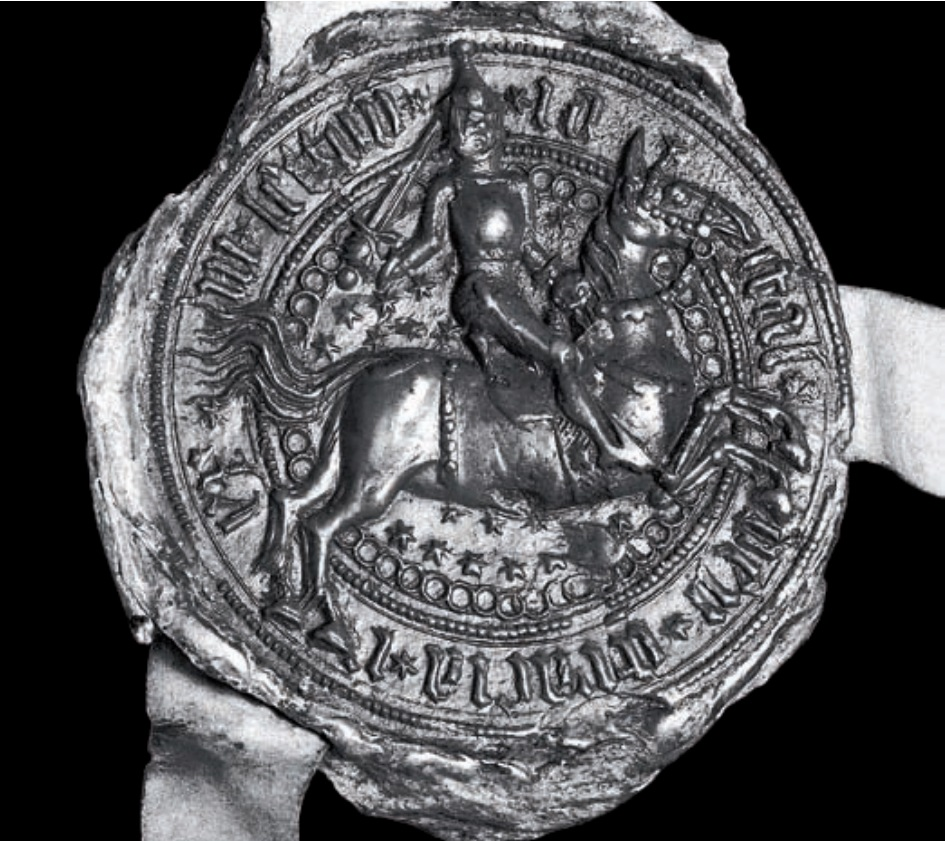
Jogaila's seal from 1382 with an inscription in Latin: iagal dey gracia rex in lettow

The establishment of the sword in the heraldry of the Lithuanian rulers is related to the ideological changes of the ruling Gediminids dynasty. The lance was more often exhibited on the seals of Skirgaila and Kaributas. In 1386, after Jogaila was crowned as King of Poland, a new heraldic seal was made for him, with four coat of arms: white eagle, representing Kingdom of Poland, knight on a horse, with lance in hand and a Double Cross on his shield, representing the Grand Duchy of Lithuania and coat of arms Kalisz land and Kuyavia. It was the first time that a double cross was depicted on the Lithuanian horseman's shield. The Double Cross was adopted by Jogaila after his baptism as Władysław and marriage with a queen Jadwiga of Poland in 1386, daughter of Louis I of Hungary, therefore the Double Cross was most likely taken over from the Kingdom of Hungary where it spread in the 12th century from the Byzantine Empire. It is also possible that the new coat of arms was made in imitation of the Holy Cross relics from the sanctuary of Łysa Góra, and with this gesture the newly crowned king emphasised his sincere faith. The symbolism of the Double Cross was connected with this event's significance for both Jogaila and the entire land. A similar cross in Western heraldry is called the patriarchal Cross of Lorraine, and it is used by archbishops while the cross itself symbolizes baptism.

=== Official coat of arms of the Grand Duchy of Lithuania ===
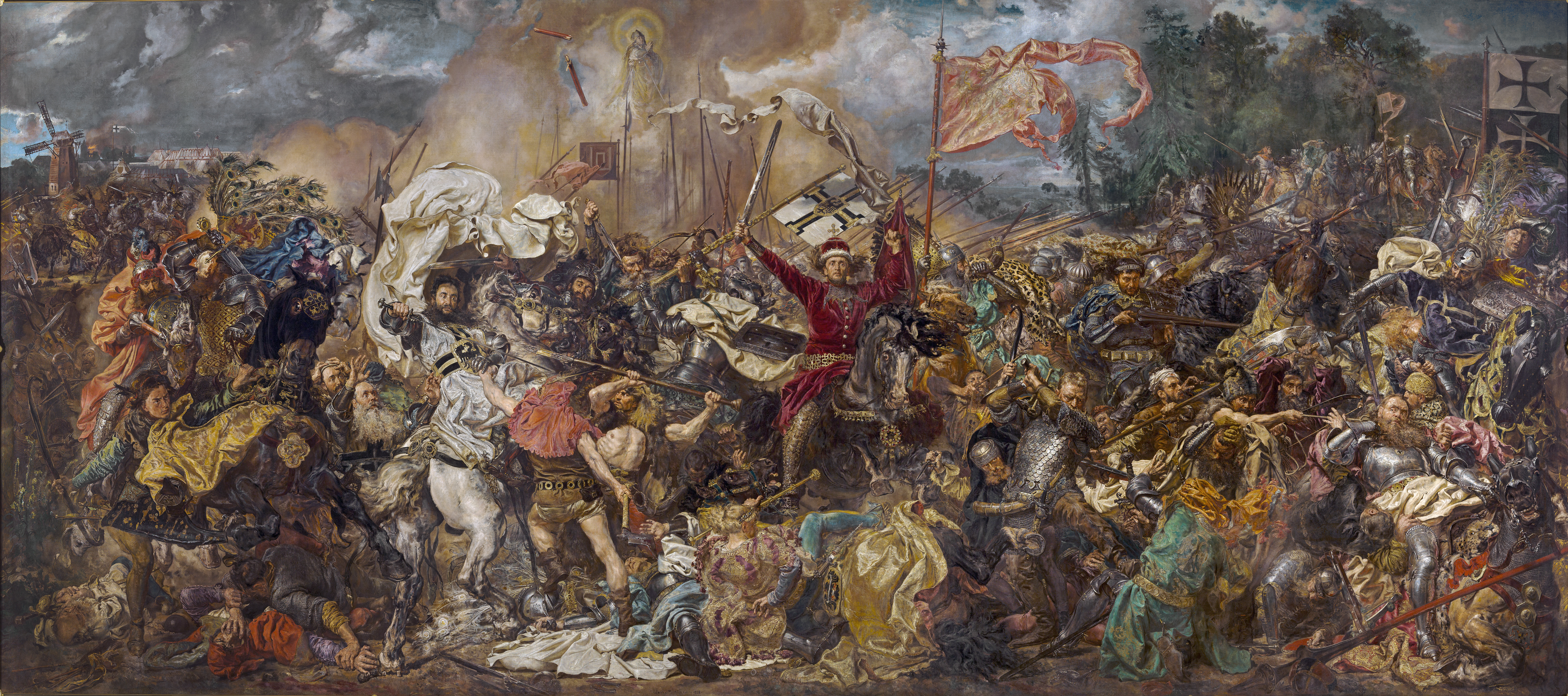
Vytautas the Great regiments flying a flag with the Columns of Gediminas during the Battle of Grunwald in 1410

According to Edmundas Rimša it was Vytautas the Great who elevated the horseman to the status of the coat of arms of the Lithuanian ruler and the state. Firstly, around 1382, he replaced the foot soldier on his coat of arms, to a horseman, transformed this personal image into a heraldic symbol. On Vytautas's majestic seal (early 15th century), he is depicted surrounded by the coats of arms of the lands under his rule. In one hand, he holds a sword symbolizing the authority of the Grand Duke of Lithuania; in the other, he raises a shield bearing the image of a horseman, which, like a royal orb, symbolizes the Lithuanian state under his rule. Furthermore, Vytautas the Great minted coins featuring the horseman on one side and the Columns of Gediminas on the other.

According to Jan Długosz, at the battle of Grunwald in 1410 Vytautas commanded forty regiments under red banners: thirty bore an armoured horseman with a raised sword, while ten elite regiments used the Columns of Gediminas. During this period, Władysław II Jagiełło adopted a coat of arms depicting an armed horseman carrying a shield with a double cross, while Vytautas adopted a similar design, with the Columns of Gediminas displayed on the horseman’s shield.

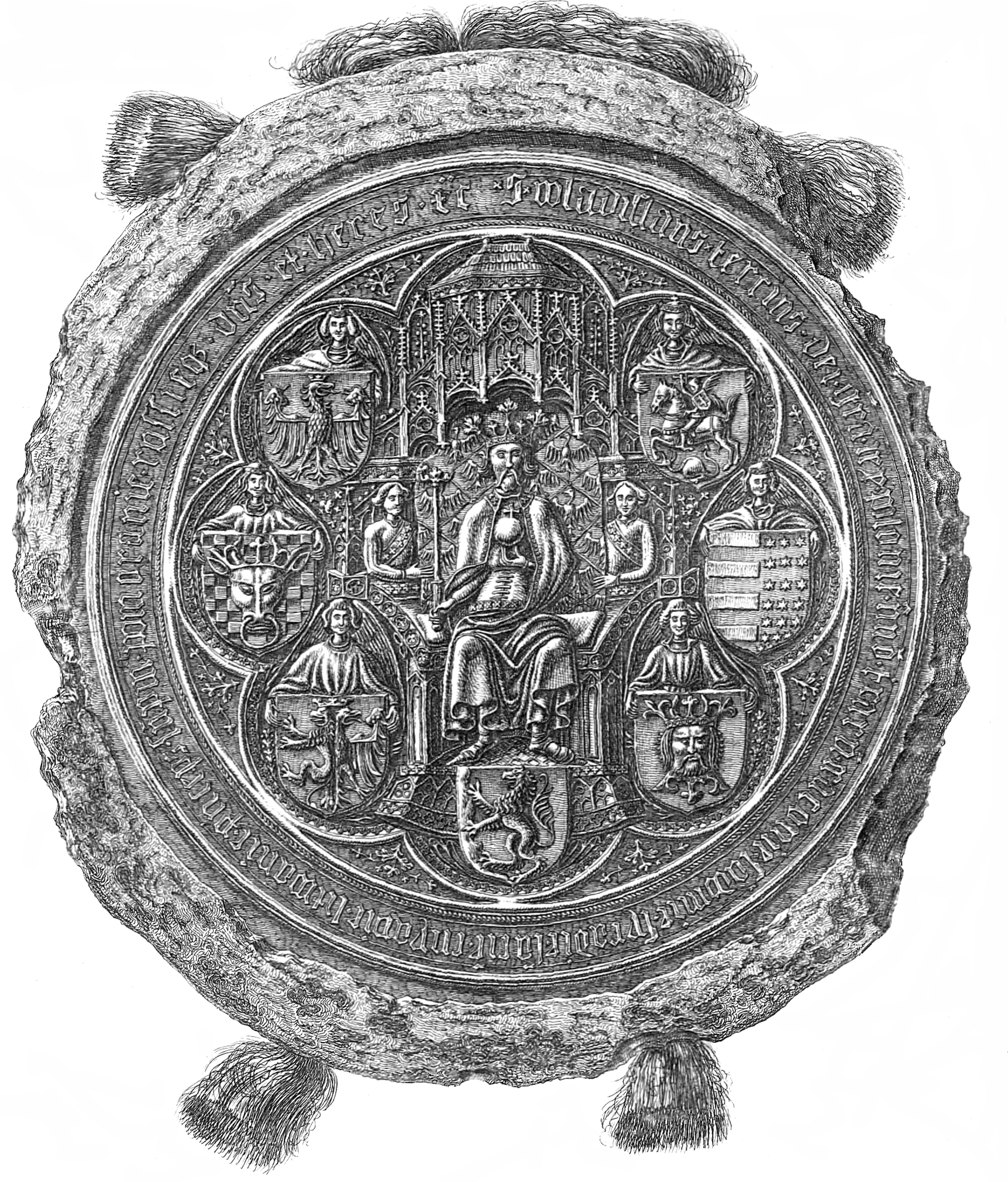
The Royal Seal of Władysław III Jagiellon, which includes a winged Lithuanian Coat of Arms, 1438

This version of the coat of arms was also used by Vytautas’ successor, Sigismund Kęstutaitis, and by the next grand duke, Casimir IV Jagiellon, a son of Władysław II Jagiełło, although Casimir eventually discontinued its use. During this period, the shield disappeared altogether from the rider’s arm. This remained the case until the final years of Sigismund I the Old’s reign, when the shield bearing the double cross was reintroduced. Meanwhile, a rider with such a shield continued to be used by the Jagiellonians in Poland, as can be seen, for example, on the great seal of Władysław III. During the reign of Sigismund II Augustus, the form of the coat of arms depicting a horseman carrying a shield with a double cross also became standardized in Lithuania.

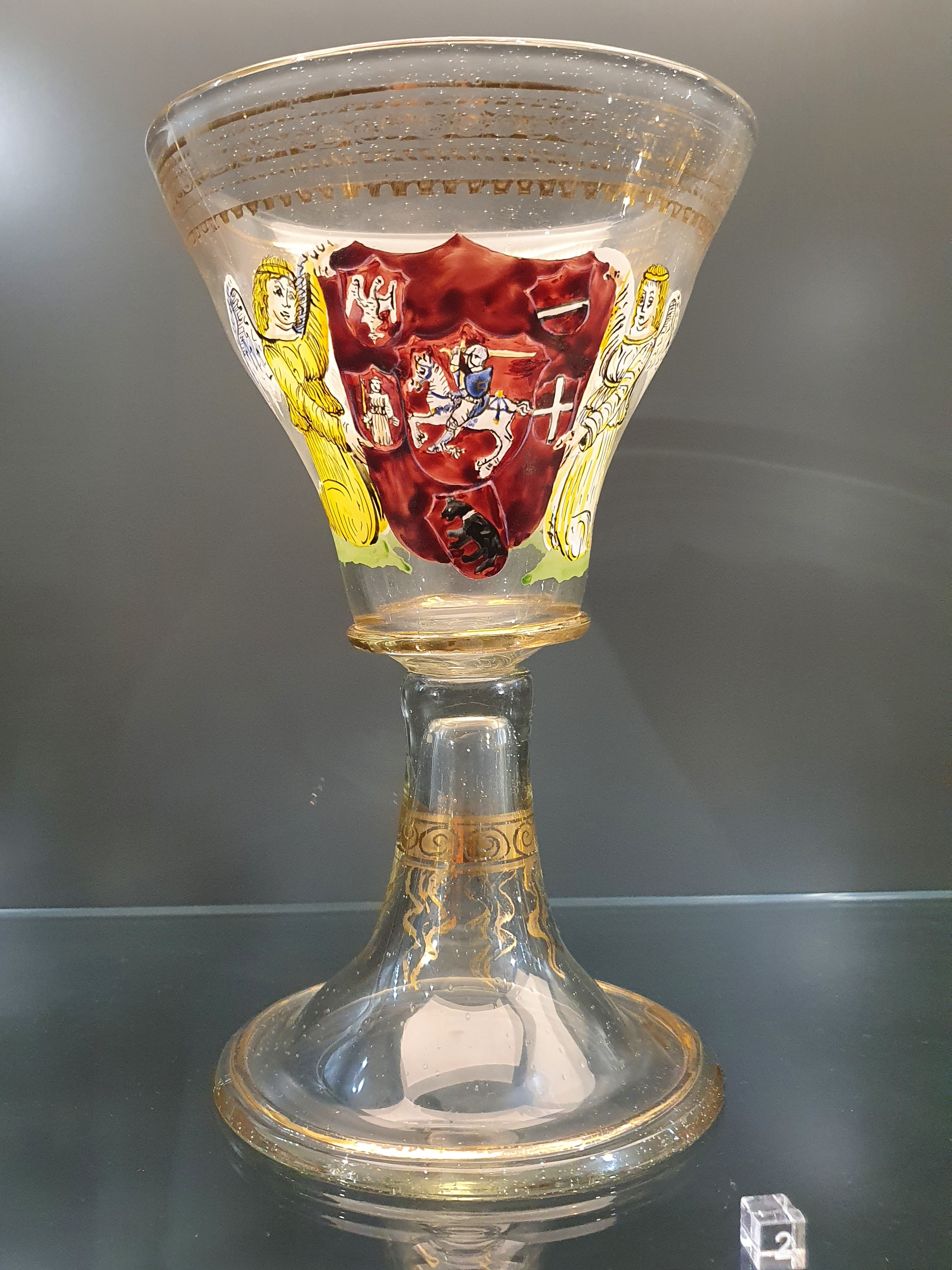
An exact copy of Alexander Jagiellon's goblet with Vytis and coats of arms of voivodeships of Lithuania (the original was made before 1501)

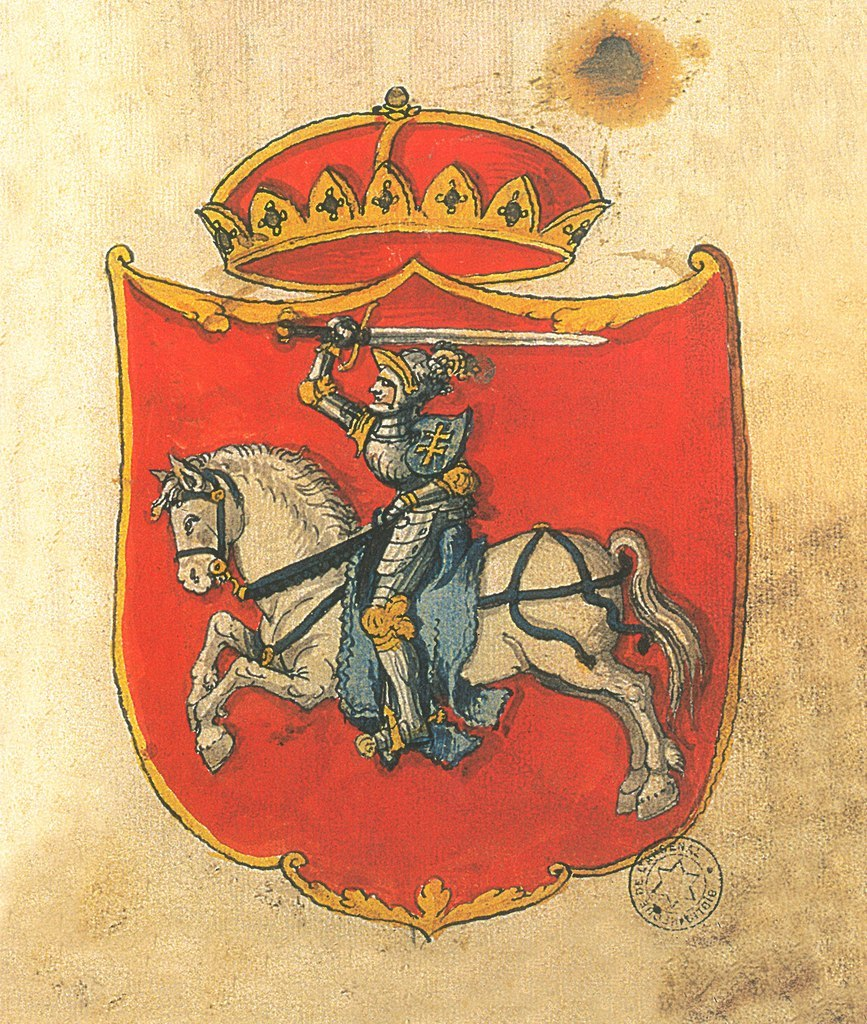
Authentic coat of arms of Lithuania with historical colours (gules, argent, or, and azure), circa 1555, surmounted by Gediminas' Cap

In 1578, Alexander Guagnini was the first to describe a Lithuanian state flag, according to him the state flag of the Grand Duchy of Lithuania was made of red silk and had four tails, its principal side, to the right of the flag staff, was charged with a white mounted knight underneath the ducal cap; the other side bore an image of the Blessed Virgin Mary. Later sources describe the flag with the knight on both sides.

After the Union of Lublin, which was signed on 1 July 1569 in Lublin, Poland, the Polish–Lithuanian Commonwealth was established, thus a joint coat of arms of the new country was adopted. Nevertheless, the Grand Duchy of Lithuania remained a separate state within the Commonwealth and had a separate army which continued using the coats of arms of Lithuania on its uniforms. Its four quarterly fields portrayed, in diagonal, the eagle and the riding knight as the symbols of the two constituent states. Hence, the old colours of the coat of arms of Lithuania, probably influenced by the colours of the coat of arms of Poland (red, white, and yellow), began to change: sometimes the horse blanket was depicted in red or purple, the leather belts in yellow; however the horseman's shield with the golden Double Cross changed less. In 1588 the third Statute of Lithuania was adopted and in the 12th article of the fourth chapter of the Statute it is stated that each county is given seals with the coat of arms of Lithuania for approval of decisions, and the name of the county must be written on these seals.

In 1572, following the death of Grand Duke Sigismund II Augustus, the last male descendant of the Jagiellonian dynasty as he did not leave any male heir to the throne, the Double Cross remained as a symbol in the national coat of arms and was started to be referred to as simply the Cross of Vytis after losing the connection with the dynasty.

The Renaissance introduced minor stylistic changes and variations: long feathers waving from the tip of the knight's helm, a long saddle-cloth, the horsetail turned upwards and shaped as nosegay. With these changes, the red flag with its white knight survived until the end of the 18th century and Grand Duke Stanislaus II Augustus was the last Grand Duke of Lithuania to employ it. His flag was coloured in crimson, had two tails, and was decorated with the knight on one side and the ruler's monogram – SAR (Stanislaus Augustus Rex) on the other side. SAR monogram was also inscribed on the flagpole finial. In 1795, after the Third Partition of the Polish-Lithuanian Commonwealth, Grand Duchy of Lithuania was annexed to the Russian Empire, with a smaller part going to the Kingdom of Prussia, and traditional coat of arms of Lithuania, which represented the state for more than four centuries, was abolished and the Russification of Lithuania was imposed.

=== Partitions period ===
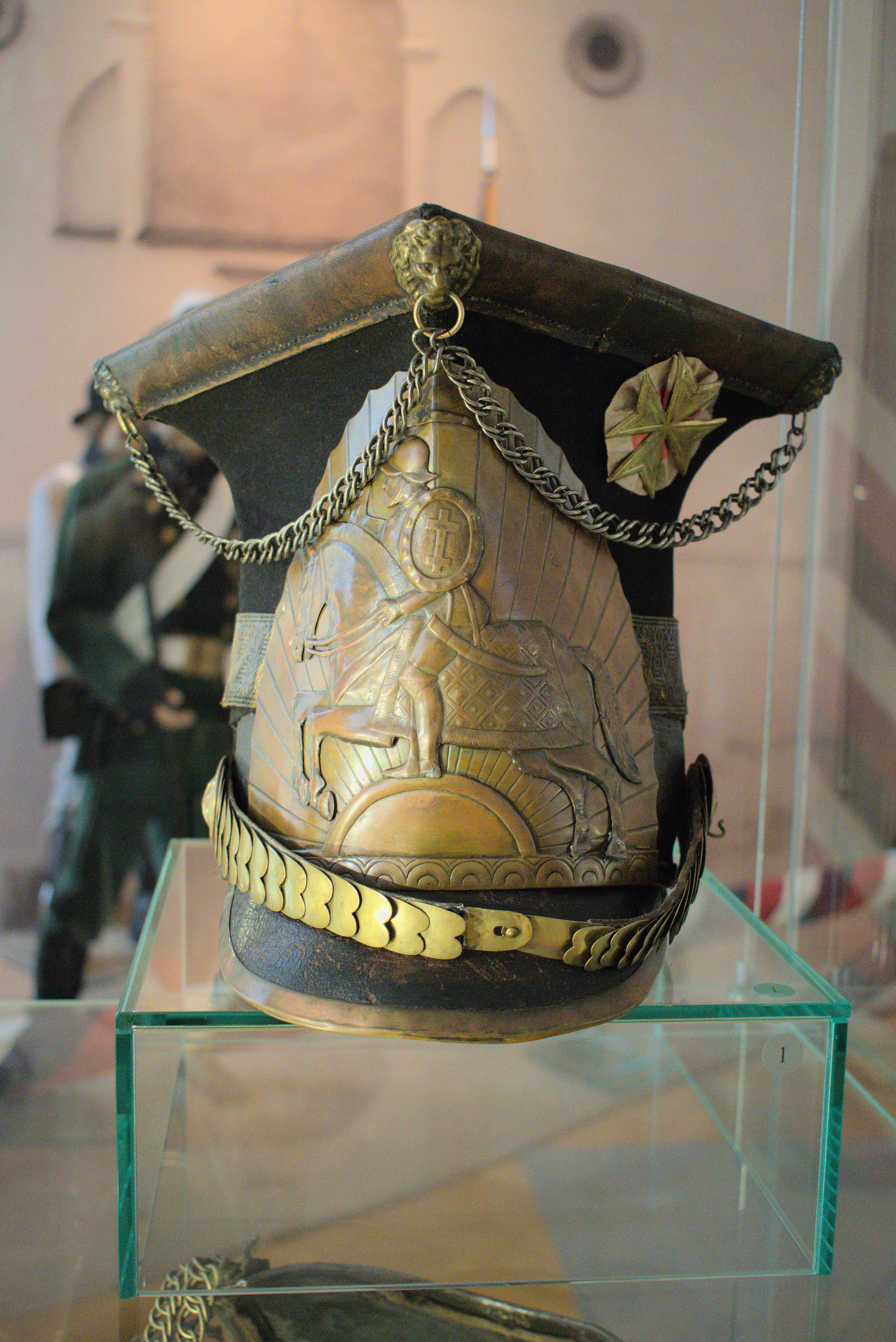
The coat of arms of Lithuania on an uhlan's hat of the Grande Armée 17th Lithuanian Uhlan Regiment

At first, the charging knight was interpreted as the country's ruler. As time passed, he became a knight who is chasing intruders out of his native country. Such an interpretation was especially popular in the 19th century, and the first half of the 20th century, when Lithuania was part of the Russian Empire and sought its independence. During the Lithuanian National Revival in the 19th century, Lithuanian intellectuals Teodor Narbutt and Simonas Daukantas claimed that the reviving Lithuanian nation is the inheritor of the Grand Duchy of Lithuania heritage, including the Lithuanian coat of arms Vytis, which was widely used in their organized events.

==== 19th-century anti-Russian uprisings ====
The coat of arms of the National Government during the January Uprising of 1863, combining the symbols of Poland, Lithuania, and Ruthenia

During the November and January uprisings, the mounted knight was used alongside the Polish White Eagle and, in 1863, the Ruthenian Archangel Michael on seals, banners, coins and other insurgent insignia, replacing the symbols used by the Russian Empire. The combined emblems expressed projects for the restoration or reconfiguration of the former Commonwealth.

==== Russian heraldry ====
Following the partition of the Polish–Lithuanian Commonwealth, most of the Grand Duchy of Lithuania was absorbed by the Russian Empire and Vytis was incorporated into the Greater Coat of arms of the Russian Empire. Vytis was the coat of arms of the Vilna Governorate following the incorporation of Vilnius and surrounding lands into the Russian Empire. Statues of Vytis placed on the White Columns of Vilnius greeted visitors at the entrances to Vilnius from 1818 until 1840, when the statues were replaced with the double-headed eagles – the state symbol of the Russian Empire. In 2019, the Mayor of Vilnius Remigijus Šimašius suggested that the White Columns of Vilnius in the city's eldership of Naujamiestis should be restored. A notable example of the coat of arms of Lithuania usage during the Tsarist period is on the bridge railings above the Vilnelė River in Vilnius. Several authentic coat of arms of Lithuania survived the occupations and annexations. For example, on the side wall of the Vilnius Cathedral, on the main portal of the Dominican Church of the Holy Spirit and on the Gate of Dawn.

However, in 1845 Tsar Nicholas I confirmed a coat of arms for the Vilna Governorate that closely resembled the historical one. A notable change was the replacement of the Double-Cross of the Jagiellonians with the Patriarchal cross on the knight's shield.

=== Republic of Lithuania in the interwar period ===
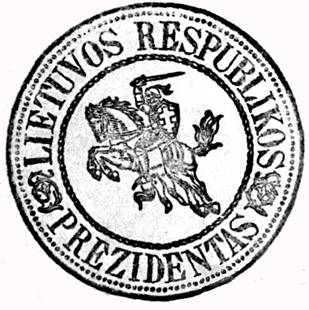
Presidential Seal of the Republic of Lithuania with Vytis, used in 1919–1940

When Lithuania restored its independence in 1918–1920, several artists produced updated versions of the coat of arms. Almost all included a scabbard, which is not found in its earliest historical versions. A romanticized version by Antanas Žemaitis became the most popular. The horse appeared to be flying through the air (courant). The gear was very ornate. For example, the saddle blanket was very long and divided into three parts. There was no uniform or official version of the coat of arms. To address popular complaints, in 1929 a special commission was set up to analyze the best 16th-century specimens of Vytis to design an official state emblem. Mstislav Dobuzhinsky was the chief artist. The commission worked for 5 years, but its version was never officially confirmed. Meanwhile, a design by Juozas Zikaras was introduced for official use on Lithuanian coins.

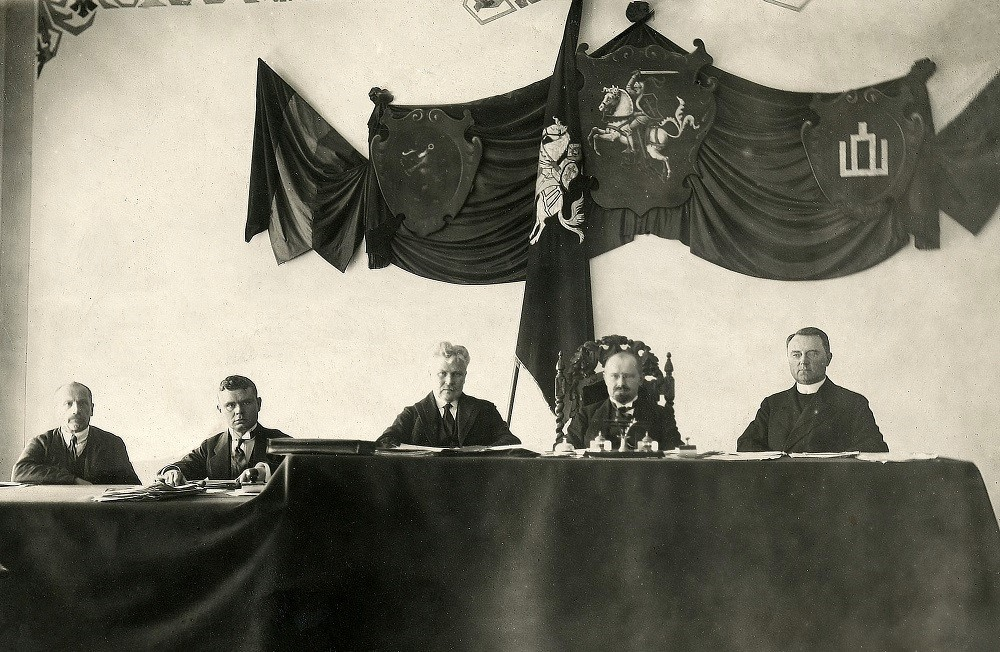
Presidium of the Constituent Assembly of Lithuania in the Seimas Meeting Hall, decorated with the Columns of Gediminas and Vytis, in Kaunas in 1920

The Columns of the Gediminids and the Double Cross of the Jagiellonians were particularly widely used in the first half of the 20th century following the restoration of the independent state of Lithuania on 16 February 1918. These symbols, as a distinctive sign, were adopted by the Lithuanian Land Forces, Lithuanian Air Force, and other public authorities. It was used to decorate Lithuanian coins, banknotes orders, medals, and insignias and became an attribute of numerous public societies and organizations. To commemorate the 500th anniversary of the death of Grand Duke Vytautas the Great, flags decorated with the Columns of the Gediminids were hoisted in Lithuanian cities and towns in 1930. Moreover, in his honor, a Lithuanian state award was instituted in the same year – Order of Vytautas the Great, which was awarded for distinguished services to the State of Lithuania and since 1991 is still conferred nowadays.

In 1919, the Double Cross of the Jagiellonians was named the Cross for Homeland and was featured on one of the highest-ranking Lithuanian state decorations – Order of the Cross of Vytis, which was awarded for acts of bravery performed in defending the freedom and independence of Lithuania (the order was abolished following the occupations of Lithuania, but was re-established in 1991). According to a presidential decree of 3 February 1920, issued by the President of Lithuania Antanas Smetona, the Cross for Homeland was renamed to the Cross of Vytis. In 1928, the Order of the Lithuanian Grand Duke Gediminas was instituted and was awarded to the citizens of Lithuania for outstanding performance in civil and public offices (it was also abolished following the occupations of Lithuania, but was re-established in 1991).

Vytis was the state emblem of the Republic of Lithuania until 1940 when the Republic was occupied by the Soviet Union and national symbols were suppressed, those who still displayed them received severe punishments. With the dissolution of the Soviet Union, the Vytis, together with the Columns of Gediminas and the national flag, became symbols of the independence movement in Lithuania. In 1988, Lithuania's Soviet authorities legalized the public display of Vytis.

=== Republic of Lithuania in the post-Cold War era ===
Variants employed by institutions
President	Seimas	Ministry of Agriculture	Ministry of the Interior	Police	Ministry of National Defence

Provisional coat of arms of Lithuania (1990–1991)

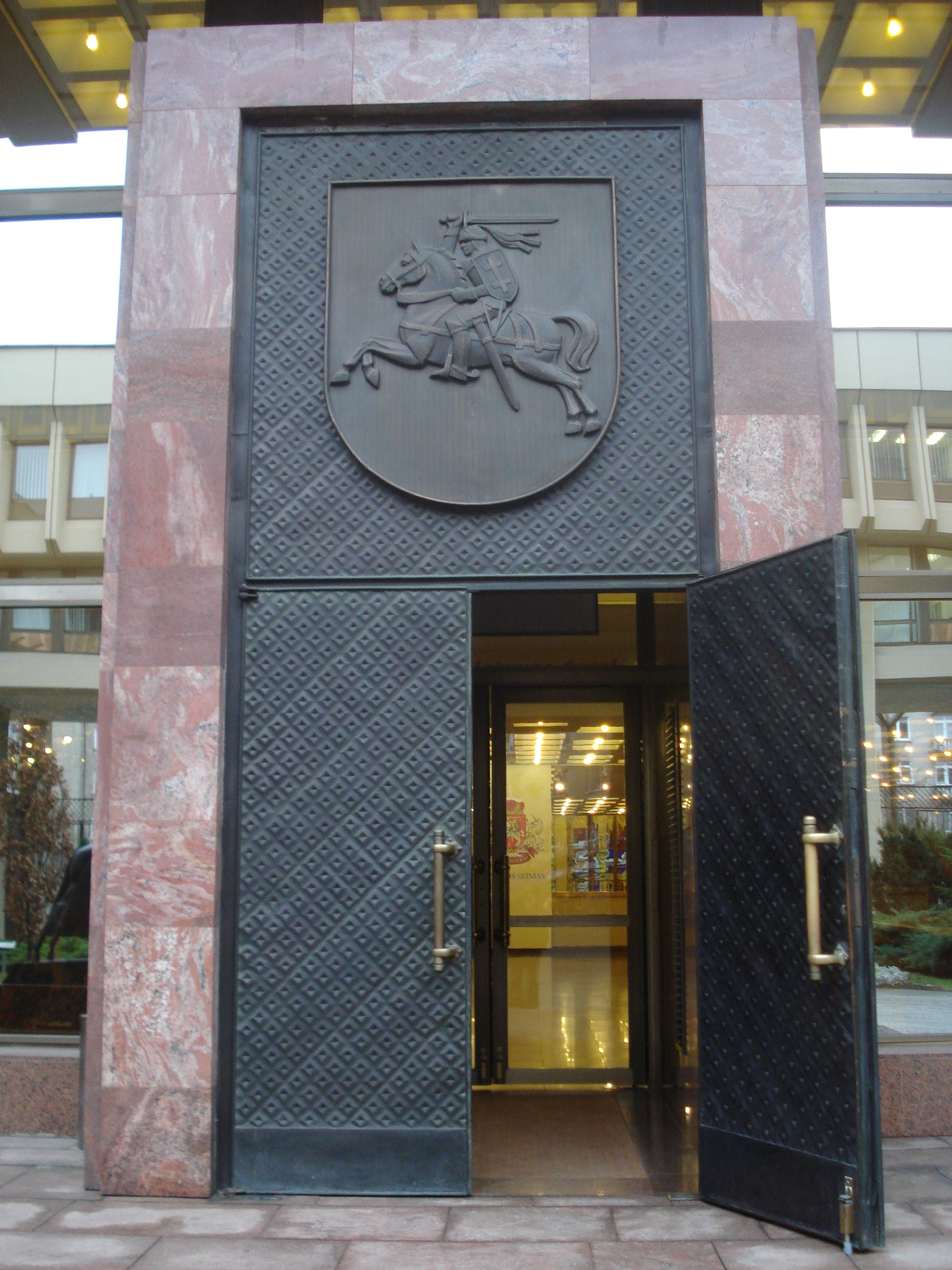
The Lithuanian coat of arms at the entrance of Seimas Palace in Vilnius

On March 11, 1990, Lithuania declared its independence and restored all of its pre-war national symbols, including its historic coat of arms Vytis. On March 20, 1990, the Supreme Council of Lithuania approved the description of the State's coat of arms and determined the principal regulations for its use. The design was based on Juozas Zikaras' version. This was to demonstrate that Lithuania was resuming the traditions of the state that existed between 1918–1940. Later on 10 April, the Supreme Council – Reconstituent Seimas adopted the Law on the National Coat of Arms, Emblems, and Other Insignias of the Republic of Lithuania, which regulates the usage of the Lithuanian national coat of arms Vytis and the historical national symbols of Lithuania. According to the 6th article of this Law, the historical national symbols of Lithuania are the Double Cross of the Jagiellonians and Columns of Gediminas.

On September 4, 1991, a new design by Arvydas Každailis was approved based on the recommendations of a special Lithuanian Heraldry Commission. It abandoned romantic interwar interpretations, harkening back to the times of the Grand Duchy of Lithuania. Nevertheless, it re-established the original colours and metals (red, blue, silver, and gold), dating to the reign of Grand Duke Vytautas the Great, but placed the horse and rider in an ostensibly more "defensive" posture, airs above the ground, rather than leaping forward and sword simply elevated rather than poised to strike. The revival of historical colours and the historical coat of arms Vytis meant that the Republic of Lithuania is not only the heir and follower of the traditions of statehood of independent Lithuania of 1918–40, but also of the Grand Duchy of Lithuania. The Constitution of the Republic of Lithuania, adopted by citizens of the Republic of Lithuania in the Constitutional Referendum of 25 October 1992, states that the Coat of Arms of the State shall be a white Vytis on a red field. Despite the newly adopted Každailis' variant of Vytis, the Lithuanian litas coins featured Zikaras' design until they were replaced by the euro in 2015.

The coats of arms of Lithuania are widely used by the Lithuanian Armed Forces on uniforms, badges, and flags.

The historical state flag of Lithuania with Vytis

In 2004, Lithuania's Seimas confirmed a new variant of the Vytis on the historical flag of Lithuania, the final design was approved on 17 June 2010. It is depicted on a rectangular red fabric, recalling the old battle flags of the Grand Duchy of Lithuania. The flag does not replace the yellow-green-red tri-colour national flag of Lithuania and it is used on special occasions, anniversaries, and buildings of historical significance (e.g. Palace of the Grand Dukes of Lithuania, Trakai Island Castle, Medininkai Castle).

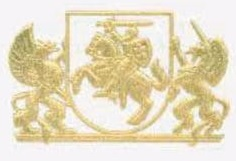
Presidential coat of arms of Lithuania with Vytis from a presidential document form, 2020

The President of Lithuania uses the circular seal and document forms with the coat of arms of Lithuania, the seal has a text "Lietuvos Respublikos Prezidentas". On the presidential flag the shield is held by a white griffin on the right side, and a unicorn of the same colour on the left, standing on a white pedestal.

Lithuania joined the Eurozone by adopting the euro on 1 January 2015. The designs of Lithuanian euro coins share a similar national side for all denominations, featuring the Vytis and the country's name in Lithuanian – Lietuva. The design was announced on 11 November 2004 following a public opinion poll conducted by the Bank of Lithuania. The horse is again leaping forward, as in more traditional versions.

The Kaunas Castle unveiled the Freedom Warrior monument on 14 July 2018, which features a graphical representation of Vytis. It was created by Lithuanian artist Arūnas Sakalauskas and Ukrainian artists Boris Krylov and Olesius Sidoruk in Kyiv, Ukraine.

In 2023, Lithuanian vehicle registration plates design was modified to include Vytis.

== Related and similar coats of arms ==
=== Lithuania ===
Coats of arms of Vilnius and Panevėžys counties use different colour schemes and add additional details to the basic image of the knight. Several towns in Lithuania use motifs similar to Vytis. For example, the coat of arms of Liudvinavas is parted per pale. One half depicts the Vytis and the other, Lady Justice.

=== Poland ===
As Lithuania and Poland were closely related for centuries, especially during the Polish–Lithuanian Commonwealth period, the Lithuanian coat of arms was also depicted in Poland.

=== Belarus ===
Coat of arms of Belarus from 1991 to 1995

The Belarusian lands had been part of the Grand Duchy of Lithuania since the Middle Ages, so the Lithuanian coat of arms grew into the local heraldic tradition and was used in the coats of arms of Belarusian towns and administrative districts, even during Russian rule. Thus, Belarusian nationalists who claimed that the Grand Duchy of Lithuania was part of a Belarusian statehood tradition adopted Lithuania's coat of arms as the Belarusian national emblem during the period of national revival in 1918. Pahonia (Пагоня, ultimately from Pogonia) is a Belarusian variant of the historical coat of arms of the Grand Duchy of Lithuania, also depicting an armed white horseman on a red background. However, in the Belarusian variant, the two-barred cross depicted on the horseman's shield has uneven bars, the saddle blanket is in the Renaissance style, the horse's tail points down instead of up, and azure is absent from it altogether.

Pahonia was chosen by the founders of the short-lived Belarusian People's Republic as the state emblem. During 1918 to 1923, it was used by the military units of the Belarusian People's Republic, as well as those formed within the Lithuanian and Polish armies. Subsequently, it was used in this role by Belarusians residing in Poland, Lithuania, Latvia and other countries in the interwar period.

During the Second World War, under German occupation Belarusians displayed Pahonia, it was used by collaborationist organisations, such as Belarusian People's Self-Help (BNS). They were also used by the Belarusian Central Council. During the Soviet period, the Pahonia coat of arms was banned and its possession was punishable by imprisonment. Soviet propaganda defamed Belarusian national symbols as being used by "Nazi collaborators". However, the coat of arms was used freely by Belarusian organisations in the West.

The white–red–white flag and Pahonia were yet again adopted upon proclaiming of Belarus' independence in 1991. Soon after the 1994 Belarusian presidential election, the Belarusians voted for the introduction of a modified version of the Soviet flag and emblem in a 1995 referendum, initiated by President Alexander Lukashenko, and abolished Pahonia as an official symbol. However, Lukashenko still signed decrees to incorporate similar symbols into several regional flags and coats of arms as in Gomel Region and Vitsebsk Region, and the previous national symbols continued to be used by the Belarusian opposition and gained exceptional popularity among the Belarusians during the 2020–2021 Belarusian protests.

=== Russia ===
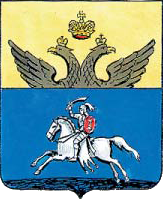
Coat of arms of Sebezh

Due to historical connections with the Grand Duchy of Lithuania (and later Polish–Lithuanian Commonwealth), some Russian regions adopted Lithuanian coat of arms from the Russian Empire period. After the dissolution of the USSR, such coats of arms were restored.

=== Noble families ===
The Lithuanian coat of arms with some modifications was adopted by several Gediminid Lithuanian, Polish and Russian noble families, namely Czartoryski, Sanguszko, Khovansky, Trubetskoy and Golitsyn. In Polish heraldry, those coat of arms are called Pogoń Litewska.

== See also ==
- Emblem of the Lithuanian Soviet Socialist Republic
- Armorial of Lithuania
- Coat of arms of Belarus

== Bibliography ==
=== Articles ===
- Bednarczuk, Leszek (1986). "Pogoń i wici (w 600-lecie chrztu Litwy)". Język Polski. 66 (3–4): 165–170.
- Daujotytė, Viktorija (2018). "Vidiniai lietuviškumo matmenys". Liaudies kultūra. 1. Lithuanian National Culture Centre.
- Gumowski, Marian (1930). "Pieczęcie Książąt Litewskich". Ateneum Wileńskie. 7 (3–4).
- Paszkiewicz, Borys (2007). "The Earliest Lithuanian Coins: Vingt ans après. Part I: The First Decade". Numizmatika. 6: 9–48.
- Uspenskis, Aleksandras (1925). "l-as gudų pulkas Gardine ir kaip jis tapo lenkų nuginkluotas (1918. XI. I–1919. VIII. 17)". Karo Archyvas (in Lithuanian). 1: 171–172.
- Rogulski, Jakub (2017). "Titles, Seals and Coats of Arms as Symbols of Power and Importance of Lithuanian Dukes Before the Union of Lublin" (PDF). Zapiski Historyczne. LXXXII (1). Kraków: Jagiellonian University. doi:10.15762/ZH.2017.06. S2CID 54787145.

=== Books ===
- Grzybowski, Jerzy (2021). Białoruski ruch niepodległościowy w czasie II wojny światowej. Warsaw: Instytut Pamięci Narodowej. ISBN 978-83-8229-251-0.
- Kotljarchuk, Andrej (2004). "The Tradition of Belarusian Statehood: Conflicts About the Past of Belarus". In Rindzeviciute, Egle (ed.). Contemporary Change in Belarus. Baltic and East European Studies. Vol. 2. Huddinge: Baltic & East European Graduate School, Södertörns högskola. pp. 41–72. ISBN 91-85139-02-5.
- Piech, Zenon (2003). Monety, pieczęcie i herby w systemie symboli władzy Jagiellonów. Warszawa: Wydawn. DiG. ISBN 83-7181-310-4. OCLC 57125015.
- Rudling, Per Anders (2014). The Rise and Fall of Belarusian Nationalism, 1906–1931. Pittsburgh: University of Pittsburgh Press.
- Rimša, Edmundas (2004). Heraldika. Iš praeities į dabartį (in Lithuanian). Vilnius: Versus aureus. ISBN 9955-601-07-8.
- Rimša, Edmundas (1998). The Heraldry of Lithuania. Vilnius: Baltos lankos.
- Rowell, Stephen Christopher (1994). Lithuania Ascending: A Pagan Empire Within East-Central Europe, 1295–1345. Cambridge Studies in Medieval Life and Thought: Fourth Series. Cambridge University Press. ISBN 978-0-521-45011-9.
- Rowell, Stephen Christopher (2003). Chartularium Lithuaniae res gestas magni ducis Gedeminne illustrans (PDF) (in Latin and Lithuanian). Vilnius: Vaga. ISBN 5-415-01700-3.
- Rowell, Stephen Christopher; Baronas, Darius (2015). The conversion of Lithuania: from pagan barbarians to late medieval Christians. Vilnius: Institute of Lithuanian Literature and Folklore. ISBN 9786094251528.
- Skoczek, Tadeusz (2016). Together with the White Eagle through the Ages: A Symbol of Rulers, the State, and the Nation (in English and Polish). Warsaw: Muzeum Niepodległości w Warszawie (Museum of Independence). ISBN 978-83-62235-79-7.
- Surgailis, Gintautas (2020). Lietuvos kariuomenės gudų kariniai daliniai 1918–1923 m. (PDF) (in Lithuanian). Vilnius: General Jonas Žemaitis Military Academy of Lithuania. ISBN 978-609-8277-00-5.
