= Arvi =

Arvi may refer to:

- Arvi, Wardha, a city in the Wardha district of Maharashtra, India
  - Arvi (Vidhan Sabha constituency)
- An ancient Hebrew word for inhabitants of Arabia; see Etymology of the word Arab
- Arvi, an Indian term for taro (Colocasia esculenta)
- Arvi (given name)
