= Arved =

Male given name

Arved is a masculine given name. Notable people with the given name include:

- Arved Birnbaum (born 1962), German actor
- Arved Crüger (1911–1942), German WWII Luftwaffe wing commander
- Arved Deringer (1913–2011), German lawyer and politician
- Arved Fuchs (born 1953), German polar explorer and writer
- Arved Heinrichsen (also known as Arvydas Hainričsenas; 1879–1900), German-Lithuanian chess master
- Arved-Ervin Sapar (1933–2021), Estonian theoretical astrophysicist and cosmologist
- Arved Ruusa (1900–1992), Estonian politician and lawyer
- Arved von Schultz (1883–1967), German photographer
- Arved Toots (1930–1992), Estonian agronomist and breeder of Tori horses
- Arved Viirlaid (1922–2015), Estonian-Canadian writer

== See also ==
- Arvéd, a 2022 Czech film
