= Seal of Mindaugas =

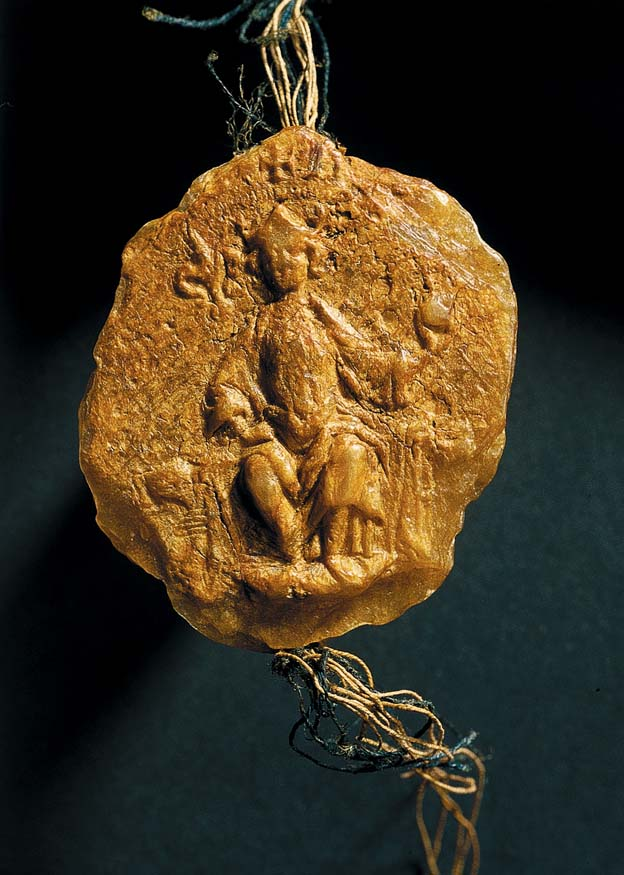
Surviving Seal of Mindaugas

The Seal of Mindaugas (Lithuanian: Mindaugo antspaudas) is a medieval seal affixed to the October 1255 act by Mindaugas, King of Lithuania, granting Selonia to the Teutonic Order.

An academic debate is ongoing regarding the authenticity of the act and the seal, as they might have been forged by the Teutonic Order. If genuine, the seal would be the only surviving contemporary depiction of Mindaugas. As the most significant surviving artifact from Mindaugas’ era, it served as the centerpiece of a special exhibition organized by the National Museum of Lithuania in 2003 to commemorate the 750th anniversary of his coronation.

== Seal impression ==
During an internal struggle in 1250, Mindaugas allied himself with the Livonian Order and the Teutonic Knights. With the assistance of the Orders, he defeated his rivals, converted to Christianity, and was crowned King of Lithuania in 1253. In return for their support, Mindaugas granted various lands to the Knights in 1253, 1255, 1257, 1259, 1260, and 1261. These six charters have sparked considerable controversy and debate among modern historians regarding their authenticity. Only one document, the October 1255 act concerning Selonia, has survived with Mindaugas’ seal. This Selonian act was also referenced by Pope Alexander IV in a papal bull dated July 13, 1257, which confirmed the territorial transfer. In May 1393, a papal legate produced a transcript and a detailed description of the seal. The description matches the surviving seal closely, with the sole difference being the color of the string attaching the seal to the parchment: the legate described it as white and yellow, while today it appears white and blue. The original document is preserved in the Prussian Privy State Archives.

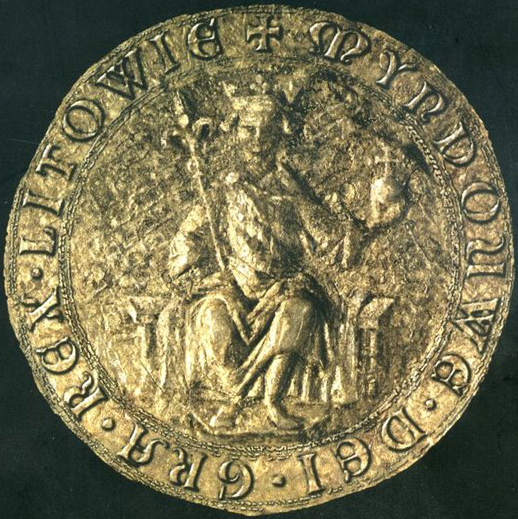
Reconstruction with inscription according to the 1393 description

The seal measures about 85 millimetres (3.3 in) in diameter, though its exact size is uncertain due to chipped edges. It depicts a ruler seated on a bench, covered with a cushion or drapery. The ruler is shown wearing a royal mantle and a crown. In his right hand he holds a scepter topped with a large lily, while in his left he holds an orb surmounted by a cross. The empty field around the figure is filled with Gothic diamond-shaped latticework, each diamond containing a small cross at its center. The legend, which should have contained Mindaugas’ name and title, is almost entirely destroyed. Only a small cross, marking the beginning of the inscription, and a single letter remain, which has been variously interpreted as M, D, or SI. According to the 1393 description, when the legend was still intact it read: + MYNDOUWE DEI GRA REX LITOWIE (“Mindaugas, by the grace of God, King of Lithuania”.

== Scholarship ==
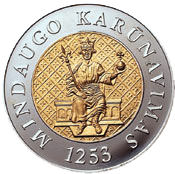
Commemorative coin of 200 litas was issued in 2003 and used the reconstructed image from the Seal of Mindaugas (by Petras Repšys)

Already in the beginning of the 19th century, German historian Ernst Hennig raised doubts about authenticity of the act. These doubts were elaborated upon by Polish historian Juliusz Latkowski. He raised a theory that the act was forged around 1392–1393 during territorial disputes over Samogitia, but the seal was authentic – it was taken from another document by Mindaugas and affixed to the forged act. This hypothesis is bolstered by the fact that the wax used to fasten the seal to the parchment is of different color. Wojciech Kętrzyński paid special attention to the fact that seal's legend with Mindaugas's name and title is almost completely chipped off while the rest of the seal and the act are generally well-preserved. He arrived to the conclusion that the legend was destroyed on purpose. He further stipulated that the act was forged while Mindaugas was alive and that the seal belonged to a completely different person, perhaps Magnus III of Sweden or Andrew II of Hungary. Antoni Prochaska dismissed any doubts regarding authenticity based on the fact that the act was mentioned in a papal bull. Karol Maleczyński also rejected ideas about forgery and argued that at some point the seal fell off and was affixed anew thus explaining different color strings and wax used to fasten it. Lithuanian heraldic expert Edmundas Rimša analyzed heraldic aspects of the seal. He paid particular attention to the Gothic latticework, which appeared in European royal seals only in the 14th century. Rimša thus concluded that the seal is a forgery made at least 50 years after the supposed date of the act.
