= Arvid Jorm =

Swedish artist (1892–1964)

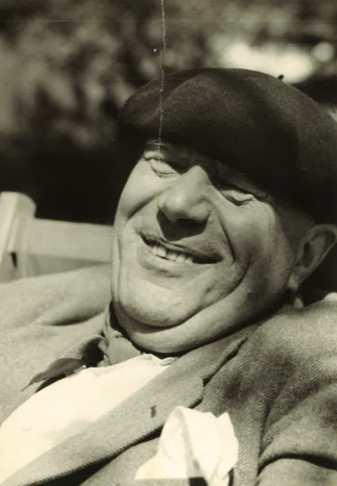
- Jorm in 1955
- Born: Arvid Kornelius Johansson; 12 October 1892; Göteborg, Sweden
- Died: 26 December 1964 (aged 72); Göteborg, Sweden

Arvid Kornelius Jorm (1892 – 1964) was a Swedish painter and graphic artist. Jorm was born Arvid Johansson in Gothenburg in 1892, the son of a shopkeeper. He changed his name to Arvid Jorm in 1919. He studied at the Valand School of Fine Arts in Gothenburg under Axel Erdmann and Birger Simonsson, and in Copenhagen under Astrid Holm. He did study trips to France, Italy and North Africa. His work included Italian landscapes and town pictures, and Swedish landscapes, coastal and harbour pictures. He worked in oils, watercolours, woodcuts, lithographs and etching. Jorm's art decorated a number of buildings in Sweden including the ceiling of Skene Church, Skövde court house, and Liseberg in Gothenburg. He died in Gothenburg in 1964.
