= Birger Simonsson =

Swedish painter (1883–1938)

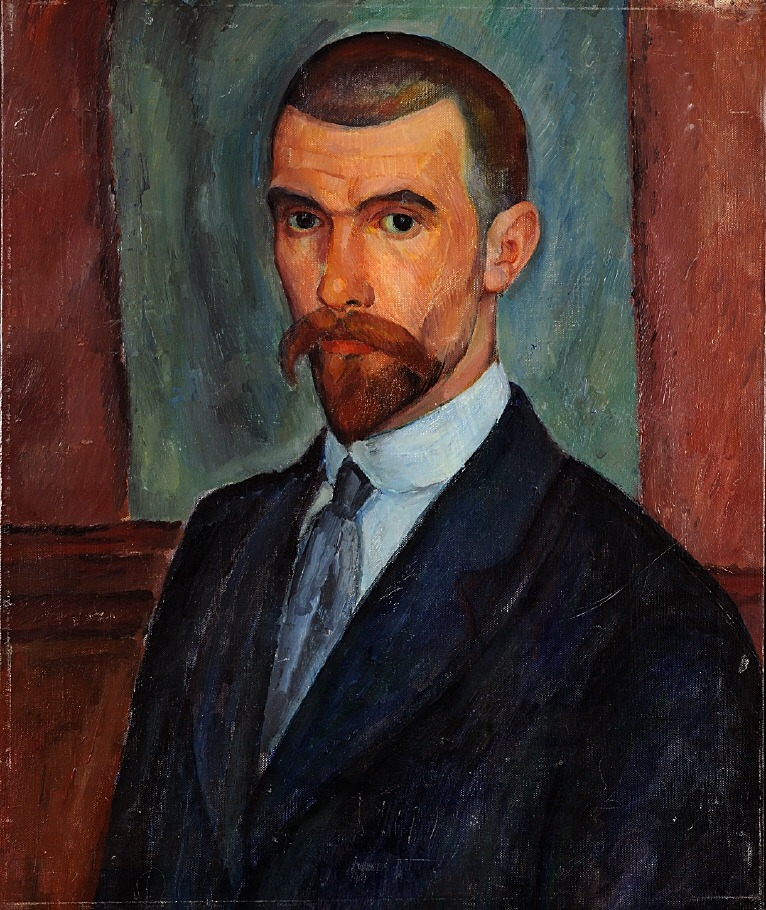
Self-portrait (c. 1910)

Birger Jörgen Simonsson (3 March 1883, Uddevalla – 11 October 1938, Stockholm) was a Swedish painter, illustrator and professor of landscape painting. He was the founder of a short-lived young artists' group called "De Unga" which was noted for expressly prohibiting women from becoming members.

== Biography ==
His parents were merchants and he grew up in modest circumstances, so he did not initially plan to pursue any type of professional career. After passing the Matura exam, he worked on the railway until he was able to gain admission to the University of Lund. He apparently benefitted little from his studies and became a member of a student group focused around the future poet Vilhelm Ekelund.

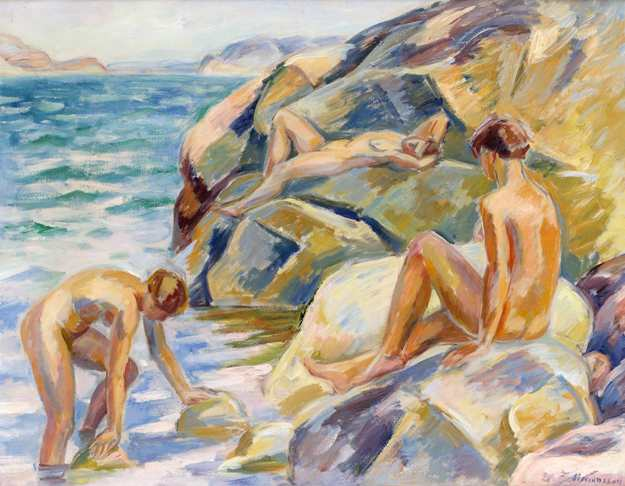
Bathing

In 1904, he wrote a letter to his sister, Gurli, informing her of his intention to become a painter. He chose to go to Copenhagen, where he studied drawing with Henrik Grönvold. At this time, he also met Kristian Zahrtmann, who advised him to seek formal training at an art school. He also made a lifetime friendship with the Norwegian artist, Henrik Sørensen. Simonsson returned to Sweden in 1905, to take part in exhibitions of the Konstnärsförbundet, but was dissatisfied with what he saw and joined Sørensen in Paris, where they began studying together at the Académie Colarossi. While there, he was introduced to the works of Van Gogh, Cézanne and Matisse.

He returned to Sweden briefly, in 1907, where he established a young artists' group called "De Unga", but was unable to generate sufficient interest as all the young artists were interested in going to Paris. From 1906 to 1912, he lived alternately in Sweden, Norway and France. From 1909 to 1910, he took lessons from Matisse but, despite his admiration for Matisse's work, preferred Van Gogh and remained an impressionist. In Sweden, De Unga had some successes at staging exhibitions, but essentially ceased to exist in 1911, as Simonsson's interest waned and he spent much of his time out painting with Sørensen. They also took a study trip to Italy, but Simonsson was unimpressed.

In 1912, he decided to settle in Gothenburg, where he was able to find a patron, Charlotte Mannheimer, who supported young artists and helped them make contacts with potential buyers. In 1915, he married Ingrid Gustafsson and spent the next two years living in Kungälv, where he painted en plein aire. He then returned to Gothenburg and taught painting in nearby Valand. He spent the summers in Bohuslän, painting portraits of women and children.

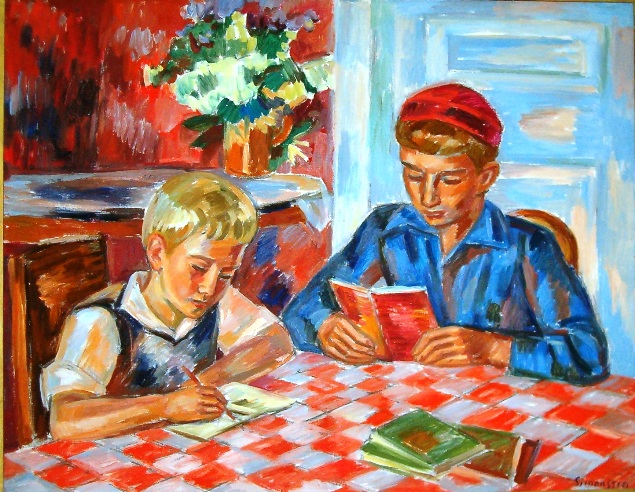
The Lesson

In 1919, after the war, he returned with his family to Paris, where they lived for seven years, although he continued to exhibit in Sweden and Norway. After returning there, he continued to exhibit prolifically and enjoyed great success but, apparently, was beginning to become depressed by the northern climate. In 1930, he became a member of the Konsthögskolan Valand and, the following year, became chair of the landscape painting department, a position he held until his death.

His works may be seen at the Moderna Museet and the Gothenburg Museum of Art as well as at smaller museums in Gävle, Örebro, Sandviken and Ystad.
