= Charlotte Mannheimer =

Swedish artist (1866–1934)

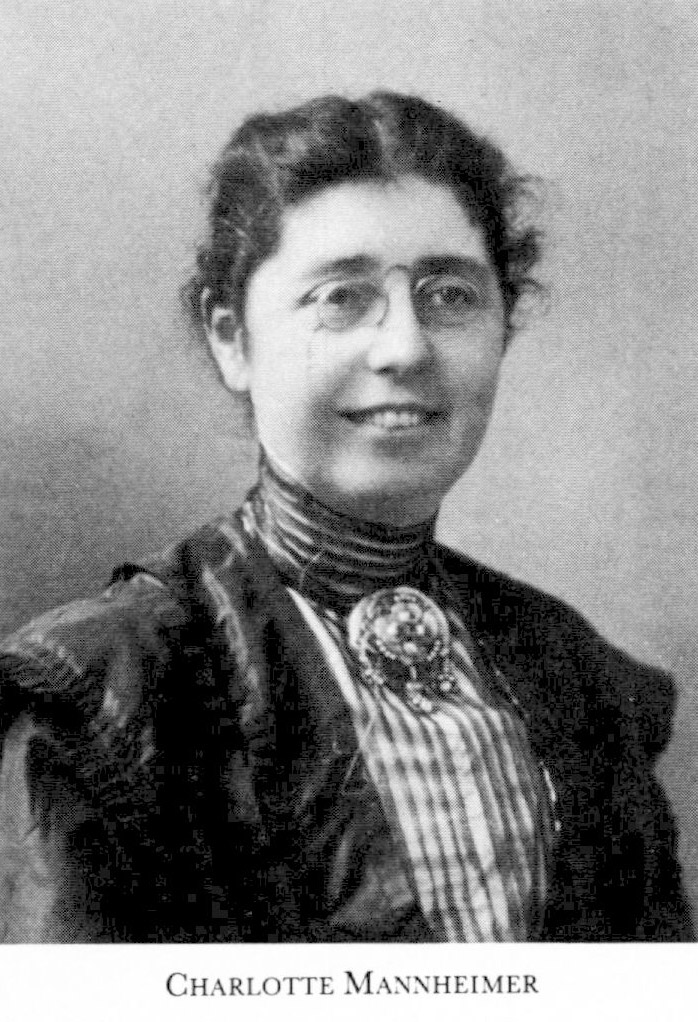
- Born: Charlotte Emma Abrahamson; 5 April 1866; London, England
- Died: 10 September 1934 (aged 68); Gothenburg, Sweden
- Other names: Charlotte Emma Mannheimer
- Known for: Painting
- Spouse: Otto Mannheimer

Charlotte Mannheimer (1866–1934) was a Swedish artist and art patron.

== Biography ==
Mannheimer née Abrahamson was born on 5 April 1866 in London, England. She attended the South Kensington Art School in London. In 1884 she and her family moved to Copenhagen, Denmark. There she attended Det Konglige Danske Kunstakademi (Royal Danish Academy of Fine Arts) where her teachers included Viggo Johansen. In 1893 she married Otto Mannheimer with whom she had five children. The couple settled in Gothenburg, Sweden. Mannheimer continued her studies at the Göteborgs Musei rit- och målarskola (Gothenburg Museum drawing and painting school), retaining the style she acquired at the Royal Danish Academy.

In the early 1900s the Mannheimers were part of a group that set up a school called Göteborgs Högre Samskola that focused on the arts. Charlotte Mannheimer was also involved with the administration of Göteborgs Musei rit- och målarskola and in 1930 became the first female member of the board. In 1909 she traveled to France where she had the opportunity to study the Impressionists and purchase art including a Renoir and a Van Gogh. In 1918 she opened a gallery called Ny konst (New Art) which she ran until 1925. She exhibited a younger generation of artists as well as her own work.

Mannheimer died on 10 September 1934 in Gothenburg.

== Gallery ==
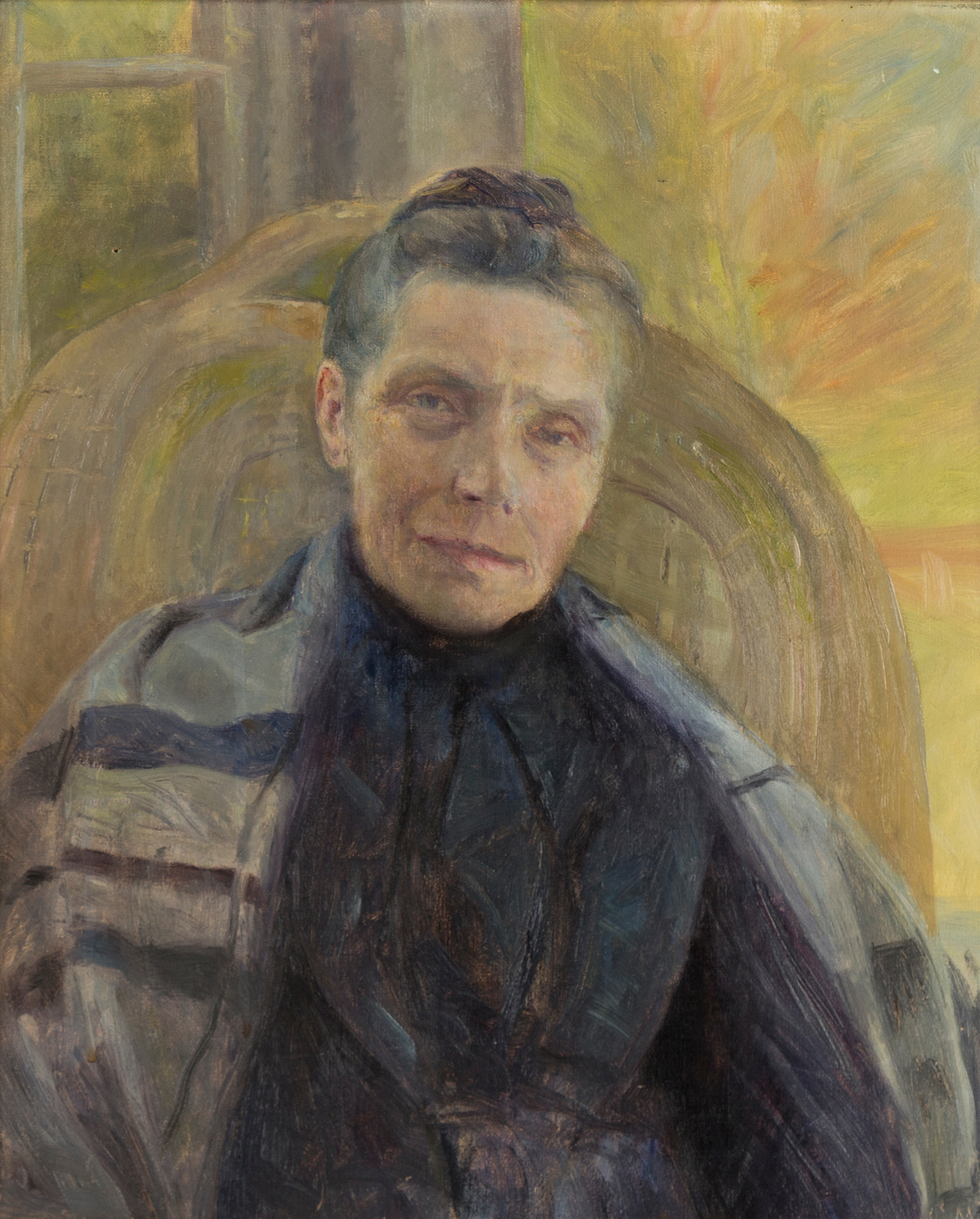
Porträtt av nurse

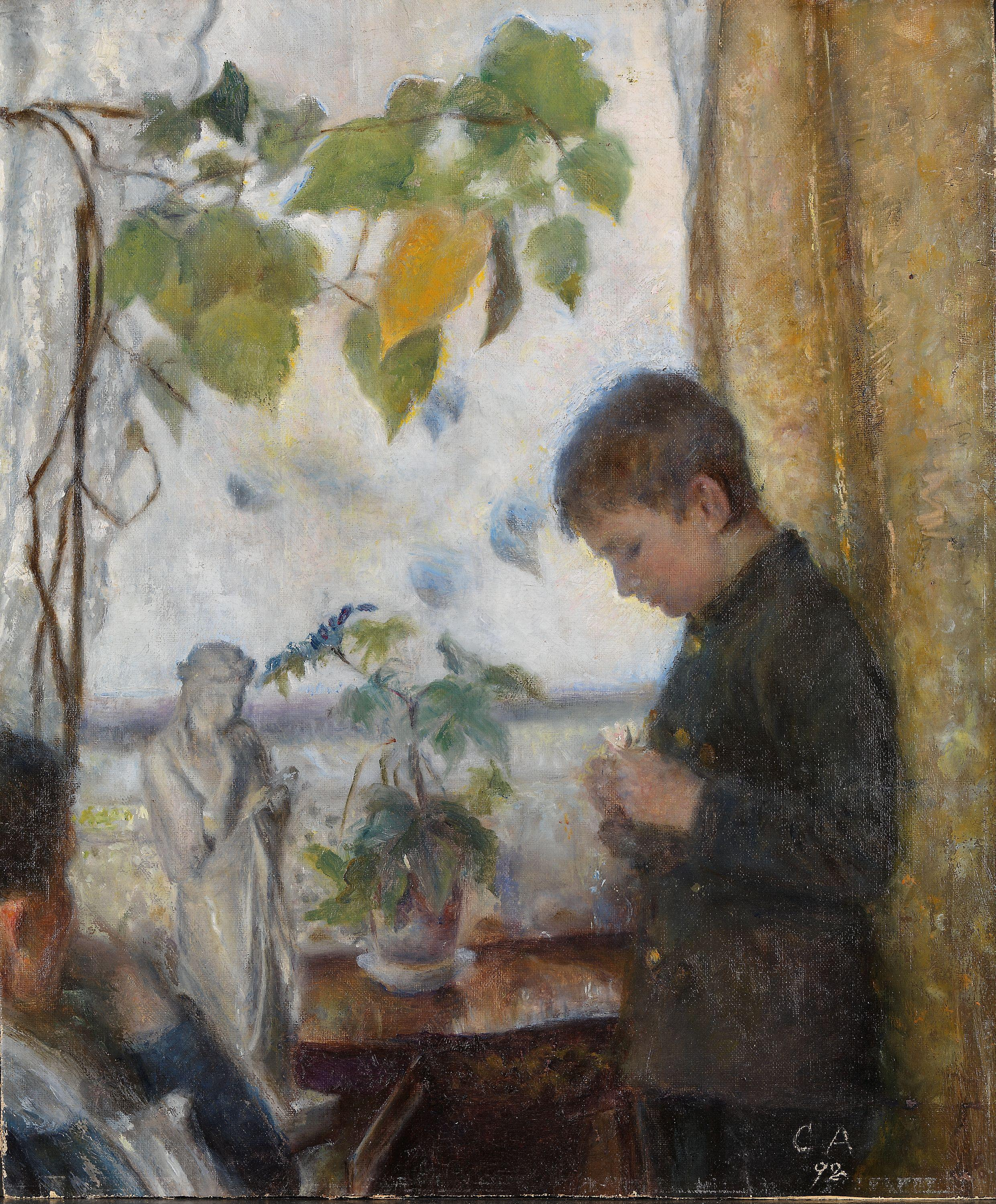
Gutt ved vinduet

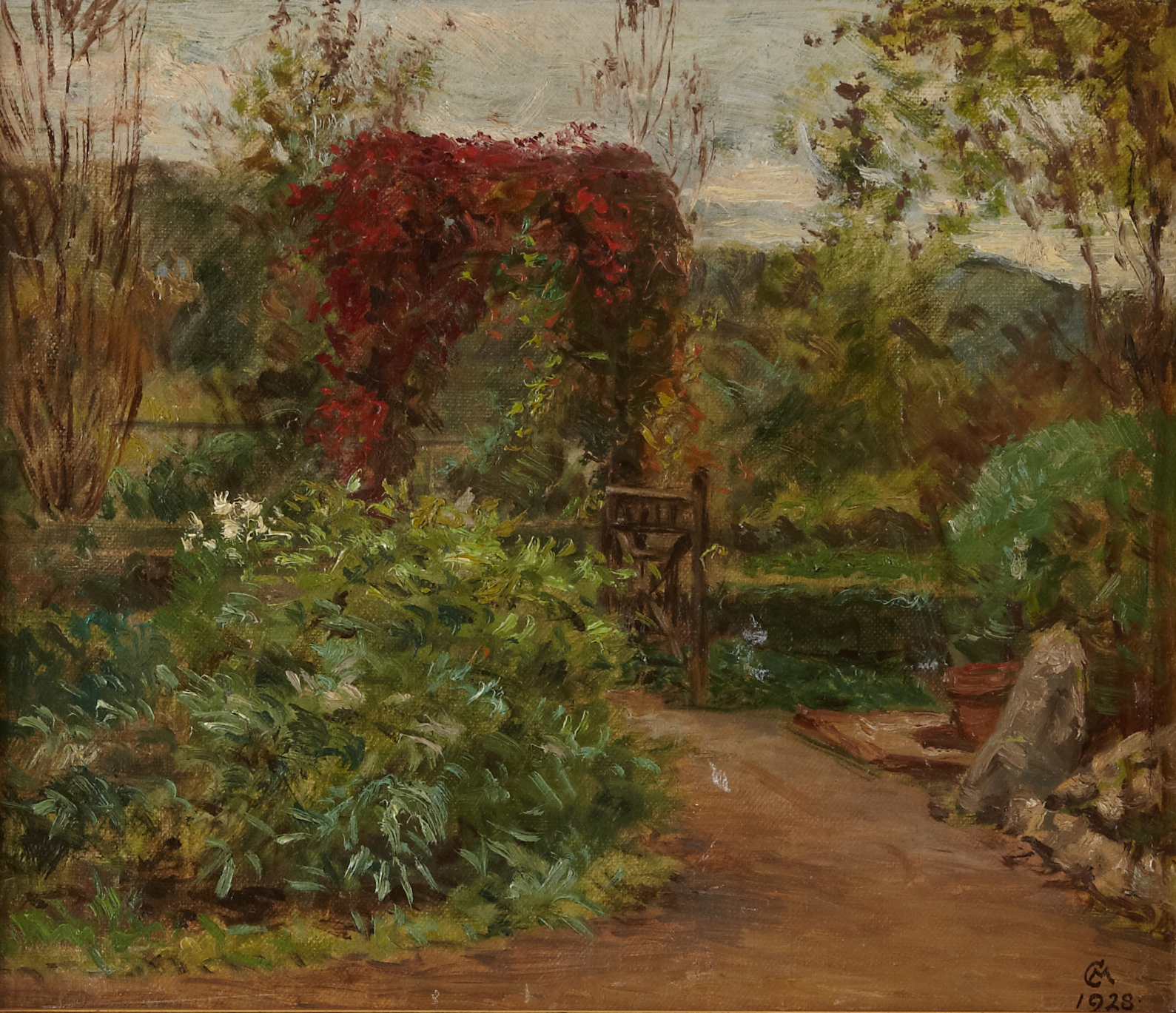
Trädgårdslandskap
