= Arvi Malmivaara =

Finnish priest and politician (1885–1970)

- Born: 23 May 1885; Kiuruvesi, Finland
- Died: 30 August 1970 (aged 85); Seinäjoki, Finland
- Occupations: Lutheran clergyman, politician
- Known for: Member of the Parliament of Finland
- Father: Wilhelmi Malmivaara

Arvi Einar Malmivaara (23 May 1885 – 30 August 1970; surname until 1906 Malmberg) was a Finnish Lutheran clergyman and politician. He was active in the Lapua Movement and later represented the Patriotic People's Movement (IKL) in the Parliament of Finland from 2 September 1935 to 31 August 1939.

Norn in Kiuruvesi, Malmivaara obtained the degree of Philosophiae Magister in 1910. He taught theology and drawing at Lapua's school of social sciences from 1909 to 1919 and served as its leader from 1913 to 1918. He was a parish priest in Kuusankoski from 1919 to 1928, in Ylistaro from 1928 to 1958. From 1939 to 1958, he also served on the Provincial Council of Lapua.

Malmivaara participated in the 1937, 1940, and 1943 presidential elections. He represented the IKL in Vaasa during his parliamentary term. He also ornamented the inner sanctuary of a church in Valkeala with Jesus in Gethsemane.

== Personal life ==
Malmivaar was the son of Wilhelmi Malmivaara, a member of Parliament, and Karin Rajander. He was married to Ruusa Emilia Sarparanta from 1909 to 1936 and from 1937 to Agnes Charlotta Isaksson. Malmivaar died in Seinäjoki.
