= Arvo Kraam =

Estonian footballer

Personal information
- Full name: Arvo Kraam
- Date of birth: 23 February 1971
- Place of birth: Estonia
- Date of death: 28 June 2024 (aged 53)
- Position: Defender

International career^{‡}
Years	Team	Apps	(Gls)
1995	Estonia	3	(0)
- ‡ National team caps and goals as of 23 May 2009

Arvo Kraam (23 February 1971 – 28 June 2024) was a football defender from Estonia. He played for several clubs in his native country, and for Tampere United in Finland.

== International career ==
Kraam earned his first official cap for the Estonia national football team on 19 May, 1995, when Estonia played Latvia at the Baltic Cup 1995. He obtained a total number of three caps.
