= Arvi Kontu =

Finnish politician

Arvi Samuli Kontu (1 September 1883 – 31 January 1945) was a Finnish agronomist and politician. He was a member of the Parliament of Finland from 1919 to 1922, representing the National Progressive Party. He was born in Kalanti.
