= Arvid Andersson =

Arvid Andersson may refer to:

- Arvid Andersson (tug of war) (1881–1956), tug-of-war competitor who won a gold medal for Sweden at the 1912 Summer Olympics
- Arvid Andersson-Holtman (1896–1992), gymnast who won a gold medal for Sweden at the 1920 Summer Olympics
- Arvid Andersson (weightlifter) (1919–2011), weightlifter who represented Sweden at two Summer Olympic Games
- Folke Alnevik (1919–2020), full name Arvid Folke Alnevik-Andersson, athlete who won a bronze medal for Sweden at the 1948 Summer Olympics
