= Arvo Sainio =

Finnish politician

Arvo Rober Sainio (30 July 1921, in Lokalahti – 23 October 1984) was an officer in the Finnish Defence Forces, a farmer and a politician. He was a member of the Parliament of Finland, representing the Finnish Rural Party (SMP) from 1972 to 1973 and the Finnish People's Unity Party (SKYP) from 1973 to 1975. He served in the Finnish Army as an officer during World War II and for a couple of years after the war before he retired from the Army and took up farming. He was the father of MP Kike Elomaa.
