= Arvi Tervalampi =

Finnish equestrian

Personal information
- Nationality: Finnish
- Born: 3 September 1928 Kem, Soviet Union
- Died: 16 January 2005 (aged 76) Sweden

Sport
- Sport: Equestrian

Arvi Tervalampi (3 September 1928 – 16 January 2005) was a Finnish equestrian. He competed in two events at the 1956 Summer Olympics. From 1976 to 1997, Tervalampi was the chairman of the National Association of Finns in Sweden.
