= Arved von Schultz =

Arved Carl Ludwig von Schultz (14 November 1883 at Rinkules muiža, Courland Governorate, now Latvia – 13 December 1967 in Hilden at Düsseldorf) was a German geographer.

== Life ==
Arved von Schultz was born in Latvia to landowner Erich von Schultz (1856–1932), who in 1892 was the inspector of goods in the city of Riga, and his wife Valerie of Moczulski. During his holidays from 1901 to 1904 Schultz led study tours in the Caucasus and the Russian Central Asia. Schultz attended the German Eltz'sche Privatgymnasium in Riga and in 1904 passed his exams at Alexander High School. Beginning in 1904 he studied in Moscow and Dorpat and in 1906 Schultz enrolled at the Friedrich-Wilhelms University (now Humboldt University of Berlin) in Berlin. His studied were interrupted in 1905 due to riots in Tartu and he spent half a year traveling through Central Asia. After returning from this trip, Schultz attended the University of Giessen, where he studied geography under Wilhelm Sievers. After another trip in 1909 to the Pamir Mountains, Schultz received his PhD in 1914 at Giessen. His dissertation was on Pamir Tajiks.

In 1918 while working as a war geographer, Schultz published an atlas of Poland. After the First World War he became a lecturer of geography at the University of Hamburg. In 1923 he became the successor of Prof. Friedrichsen at Albertus University in Königsberg. Schultz took long trips to Asia and Russia was considered one of the top German geographers of his time. He was a board member of the Johann Gottfried von Herder Prize committee.

Schultz married Hella Fanny Gertrude Suhr (born 24 April 1893 Grünfelde; died 2 September 1952 in Düsseldorf-Benrath) on 4 April 1914 at Green Field at Stuhm in West Prussia.

== List of publications ==
- Vorläufiger Bericht über meine Pamirexpedition 1909,in A. Petermann's Mittheilungen aus Justus Perthes’ Geographischer Anstalt 56, 1910. pp. 140–141.
- Volks- und wirtschaftliche Studien im Pamir, in A. Petermann's Mittheilungen aus Justus Perthes’ Geographischer Anstalt 56, 1910. pp. 250–254.
- Zur Kenntnis der arischen Bevölkerung des Pamir, in Orientalisches Archiv II, 1911–12. pp. 23–29.
- Bericht über den bisherigen Verlauf meiner Pamirexpedition 1911/12, in A. Petermann's Mittheilungen aus Justus Perthes’ Geographischer Anstalt 58, 1912. 190–193, 261–265.
- Die Pamirtadschik : auf Grund einer mit Unterstützung des Museums für Volkerkunde zu Giessen in den Jahren 1911/12 ausgeführten Reise in den Pamir (Zentralasien), Giessen: A. Töpelmann, 1914
- Der materielle Kulturbesitz der Pamirtadschik. 1914.
- Landeskundliche Forschungen im Pamir. Hamburg. 1916. (Abhandlungen des Hamburger Kolonialinstituts 33).
- Die natürlichen Landschaften von Russisch-Turkestan. Hamburg: L. Friederichsen, 1920.
- Die natürlichen Landschaften von Russisch-Turkestan, Geographical Review 1922
- Sibirien, 1923
- Aride Einebnung im Pamir, 1926
- Das Ussuri-Land, 1930
- mit K. Bouterwek, H. Anger, G. Wegener, H. Rosinski: Nordasien, Zentral- und Ostasien in Natur, Kultur und Wirtschaft, Handbuch der Geographischen Wissenschaft 1937
- Europäisches Rußland, 1937
- Der Erdteil Asien, Stuttgart 1950
