= Arvydas Kostas Leščinskas =

Lithuanian politician

Arvydas Kostas Leščinskas (born 15 November 1946) is a Lithuanian politician. In 1990 he was among those who signed the Act of the Re-Establishment of the State of Lithuania. In 1992–1995 Deputy Minister of Transportation Lithuania. In 1995–1996 he was Minister of Energy Lithuania. In 1996–2007 he was Director General of insurance company Industrijos Garantas.
