= Arvydas Každailis =

Lithuanian artist (born 1939)

Arvydas Stanislavas Každailis
- Born: April 4, 1939 (age 87); Baisogala, Lithuania
- Education: Vilnius Academy of Art
- Known for: Designing coats of arms and heraldry
- Notable work: Coat of arms of Lithuania; Coat of arms of Vilnius; Flag of the President of Lithuania
- Awards: Order of the Lithuanian Grand Duke Gediminas (1999); Grand Amber Prize, Baltic Triennial Art Exhibition (1986); Lithuanian National Prize (2002)

Arvydas Stanislavas Každailis (born 4 April 1939, in Baisogala) is a Lithuanian artist, best known as the creator of many coat of arms for cities and towns of Lithuania. For his achievements in Lithuanian art, he was awarded the Order of the Lithuanian Grand Duke Gediminas in 1999.

Každailis studied graphics at the Vilnius Academy of Art from 1957 to 1962. After graduation, he worked as a teacher at the National M. K. Čiurlionis School of Art from 1965 to 1985. In 1987 he joined the Lithuanian Heraldry Commission. As of 2007, he held 22 personal exhibitions in Lithuania, Latvia, and Estonia.

To the wider public he is best known as the creator of the coat of arms of Lithuania, coat of arms of Vilnius (the capital city), and the flag of the president of Lithuania. Každailis also works as book illustrator. He experimented with numerous techniques, styles, and themes, but his best works are considered to be related with the history of Lithuania. His 54-image cycle for a book by Simanas Daukantas won the Grand Amber Prize of the Baltic Triennial Art Exhibition in 1986. 42 of these images were donated to the Lithuanian Art Museum in 2002. In 2002 he was awarded the Lithuanian National Prize for his 65 etchings inspired by the Chronicon terrae Prussiae.
