= Arvid Reuterdahl =

Swedish-American engineer

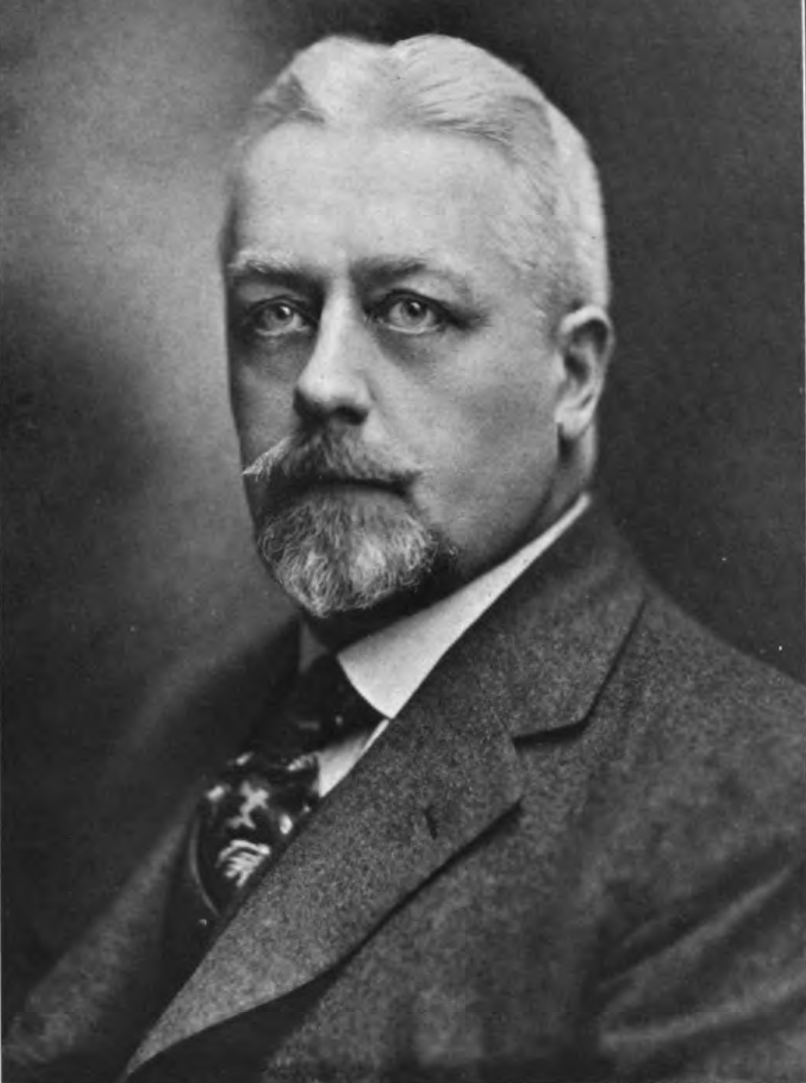
- Born: February 15, 1876; Karlstad
- Died: January 13, 1933 (aged 56)
- Occupations: Engineer, writer

Arvid Reuterdahl (February 15, 1876 – January 13, 1933) was a Swedish-American engineer, scientist and educator.

== Biography ==
Reuterdahl was born at Karlstad on February 15, 1876. He moved to the United States as a child in 1882. He graduated Sc.B. from Brown University in 1897 and was a mathematics and physics instructor at the Technical High School in Providence. Reuterdahl worked as an engineer in Spokane, Washington for five years and as an assistant city engineer, water commissioner and President of the board of public works. He designed bridges for the city. He was a consulting engineer in Boise, Idaho (1910–1913) and Kansas City, Missouri (1913–1918).

He was a professor of theoretical and applied mechanics at Kansas City Polytechnic Institute (1915–1918) and was the first Dean of the Department of Engineering and Architecture at the College of St. Thomas (1918–1922). He was President of the Ramsey Institute of Technology, Saint Paul, Minnesota (1922-1926).

He was a Fellow of the American Association for the Advancement of Science. He married Elinor Morrison on June 16, 1902. They had one son, Norman Morrison Reuterdahl.

== Opposition to the theory of relativity ==
Reuterdahl was a noted opponent of Albert Einstein's theory of relativity. He considered Einstein's theory to be largely "bunk" and accused him of plagiarism. Reuterdahl argued that Einstein's theory of relativity was plagiarized from a mechanical gravitation theory of Scottish engineer Robert Stevenson (pseudonym Kinertia). He argued that Stevenson's papers were sent to the Prussian Academy of Sciences in 1903 and that Einstein, a member of the Academy secretly made use of the papers.

Reuterdahl communicated with other anti-relativists such as Ernst Gehrcke. He was the science editor for Henry Ford's journal the Dearborn Independent.

== Selected publications ==
- Scientific Theism Versus Materialism: The Space-time Potential (1920)
- Einstein and the New Science (1921)
- "Kinertia" Versus Einstein (1921)
- A Synthesis of Number, Space-Time and Energy (1923)
- The God of Science (1928)
- Einsteinism: Its Fallacies and Frauds (1931)
