= Arvo Viljanti =

Finnish historian

Arvo Kunto Viljanti (until 1935 named Viklund, 24 August 1900 in Pargas – 6 July 1974 in Turku) was a Finnish historian.

Viljanti had earned a PhD and from 1962 worked as a professor at the University of Turku. He was specialized in Swedish–Finnish military history of the 16th and 17th centuries.
