= Edmundas Antanas Rimša =

Edmundas Antanas Rimša (December 15, 1948 in Skirai, Rokiškis district) is a Lithuanian historian, specialist of heraldics, sfragistics and genealogy.

== Biography ==
In 1977, Rimša graduated from Vilnius University and began working at the Ministry of Culture of the Lithuanian SSR. In 1981, he began working at the Lithuanian History Institute. In 1993 he received Ph.D. for his doctoral thesis Coat of Arms in the History of Lithuanian Cities. He has been teaching at Vilnius University (from 1991) and Vytautas Magnus University (in 1995–98). Rimša works as a consultant at Vilnius Academy of Fine Arts and as an expert of coins design at the Bank of Lithuania.

Rimša is a member of the editorial board of academic journals Lietuvos istorijos metraštis (Lithuanian History Annals) and Numizmatika, published by the Lithuanian National Museum. He is a member of the Poland Heraldry Association and the chairman of the Lithuanian Heraldry Commission.

For his book Lietuvos Didžiosios Kunigaikštystės miestų antspaudai, he was awarded the Knight's Cross of the Order of the Lithuanian Grand Duke Gediminas.

== Important works ==
Rimša has published more than 70 scientific articles, and over 100 popular articles.

Books:

1. Heraldika. Iš praeities į dabartį, 2004, 184 p. Translated into English as (Heraldry: Past to present in 2005).
2. Kauno miesto herbas XV–XX a. 1994.
3. Lietuvos Didžiosios Kunigaikštystės miestų antspaudai. 1999, 765 p.
4. Lietuvos heraldika, vol. 1–2, compiled by E. Rimša, 1998–2004 (192 and 240 p.).
5. Lietuvos miestų istorijos šaltiniai, vol. 1–2, compiled by Z. Kiaupa ir E. Rimša, 1988–1992 (166 and 208 p.)
6. The Heraldry of Lithuania, compiled and arranged by E. Rimša, Vilnius: Baltos lankos, 1998, bk. 1, 192 p.
7. Lietuvos Metrika. Knyga Nr. 556: (1791–1792); Viešųjų reikalų knyga 35, by A. Baliulis, R. Firkovičius, E. Rimša, 2005, 200 p.
8. Lietuvos didžiojo kunigaikščio Vytauto anspaudai ir žemių heraldika. 2016, 192 p.
