= Polish National Loan Bank =

Bank of issue based in Warsaw

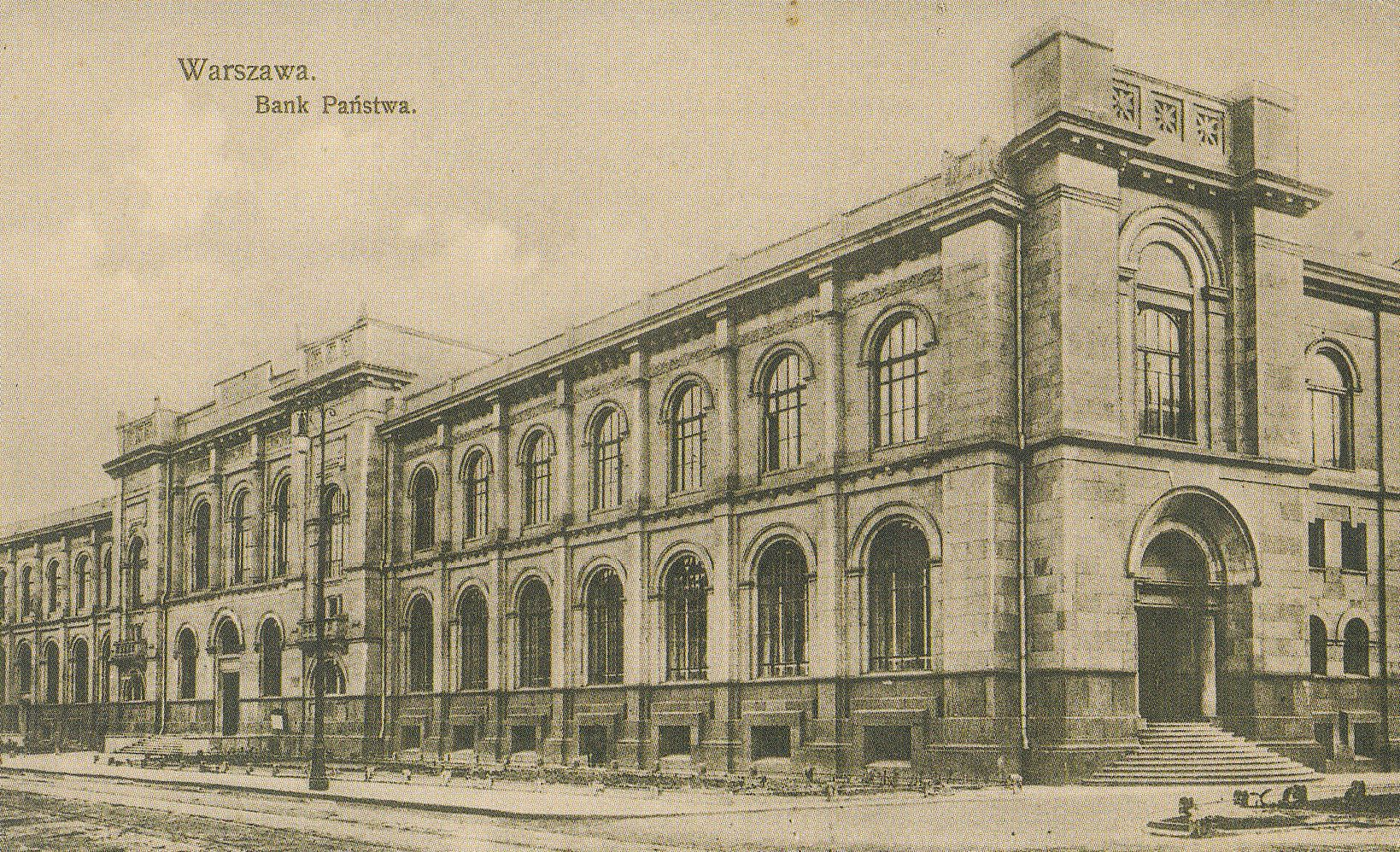
Former head office of the Polish National Loan Bank in Warsaw (destroyed in 1944)

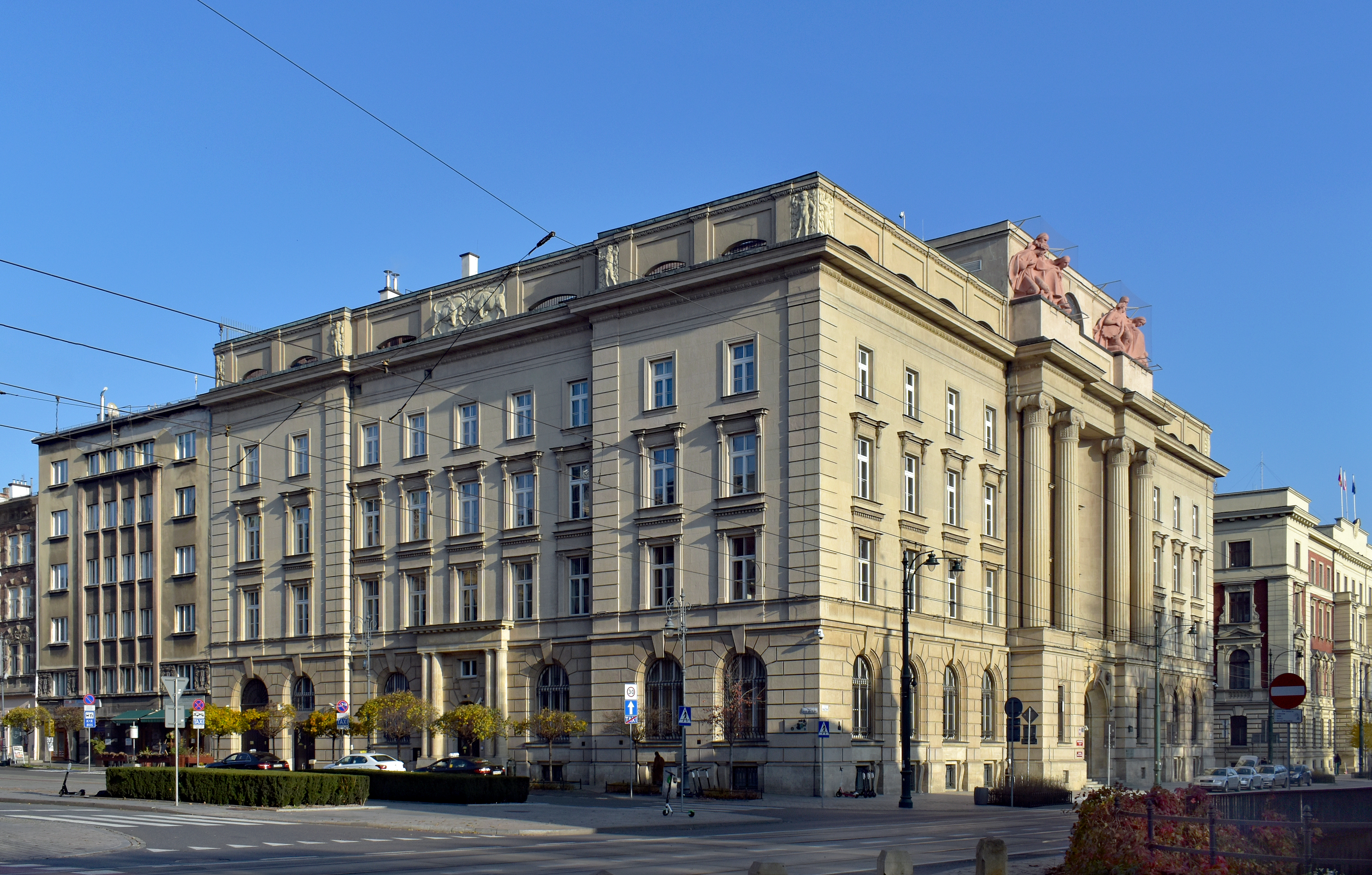
Branch building in Kraków, commissioned by the Polish National Loan Bank and completed in 1925

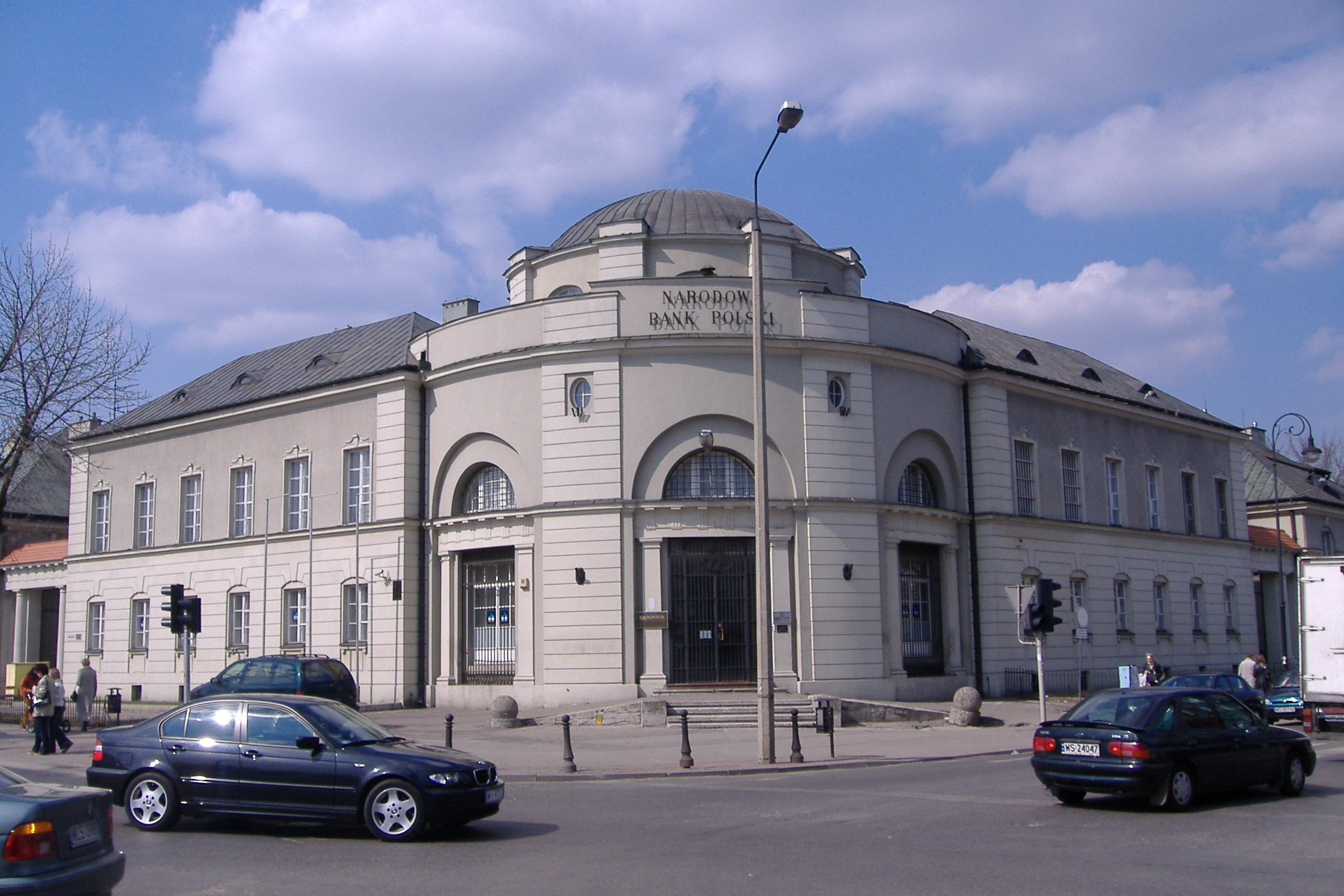
Branch building commissioned by the bank in Siedlce, completed in 1924

The Polish National Loan Bank (Polish: Polska Krajowa Kasa Pożyczkowa, German: Polnische Landes-Darlehnskasse) was a bank of issue created in late 1916 by Germany's Ober Ost for the puppet Kingdom of Poland. The Second Polish Republic initially maintained it as a state-owned entity, and expanded its territorial scope to the country's entire territory. The bank, however, was unable to prevent hyperinflation, and was replaced in 1924 with a new national institution, Bank Polski SA.

== Overview ==
The Polish National Loan Bank was established in December 1916 by Germany and Austria-Hungary to serve their puppet Kingdom of Poland. It started operations on 26 April 1917, issuing banknotes in Polish marka at par with the German reichsmark. Governor-General Hans Hartwig von Beseler was instrumental in the new institution's establishment.

When Poland emerged as an independent country in 1918, the Polish National Loan Bank had an issue outstanding of 880 million marks, which was taken over by the new Polish Government. An agreement was made on that matter between Poland and the Weimar Republic on 18 December 1922, under which the German authorities reimbursed the notes in reichsmarks at par. Given German inflation at the time, however, the corresponding value was mostly symbolic.

Meanwhile, the new country brought together territories formerly under the central banking jurisdiction of the State Bank of the Russian Empire, Austro-Hungarian Bank, and German Reichsbank in addition to the short-lived kingdom of Poland. The Polish National Loan Bank took over the role of issuing currency for that combined geographical scope. Beyond its initial use around Warsaw, the Polish mark became the only currency in Greater Poland in November 1919, then in Pomerania in February 1920, in Galicia by withdrawal from circulation of the Austro-Hungarian krone in March 1920 and of the Russian ruble a month later (at an exchange rate of 0.46 Polish marks to the ruble), and in Cieszyn Silesia in April 1920. In July 1921 the German ostrubel was withdrawn from circulation in eastern borderlands. In Upper Silesia, following the 1921 plebiscite and subsequent division, the German mark was to remain in circulation for another 15 years in accordance with the German–Polish Convention. In November 1923, however, the Polish government introduced the Polish mark as the sole legal tender there.

In 1920, an agreement was signed between the Polish Republic and the Free City of Danzig with the intent to establish a currency union that would complement their customs union. The Polish National Loan Bank subsequently opened a branch in the Free City, but the monetary union was never implemented and eventually abandoned in September 1923, paving the way for the establishment of the autonomous Bank of Danzig in early 1924.

The Polish National Loan Bank was unable to avoid hyperinflation in the early 1920s. A half kilogram loaf of bread cost 3 Polish marks in 1918, 35 marks in 1921, and 1,000 marks in May 1923. In the course of 1923, the Loan Bank issued banknotes of up to 10 million marks, and ordered additional notes of up to 100 million marks that were however not distributed. In early 1924, Prime Minister Władysław Grabski presided over a series of reforms that culminated with the opening of Bank Polski SA and circulation of the Polish zloty on 28 April 1924, followed by the demonetization of the Loan Bank's Polish marks on 1 July 1924.

== Leadership ==
- Dr Dittmer, Director 1916-1918
- Stanisław Karpiński, Director from November 1918 to April 1919 and chairman in 1924
- Ernest Adam, Director in 1919
- Władysław Byrka, Director 1919-1920
- Kazimierz Bigo, Director 1920-1923
- Jan Kanty Steczkowski, Director 1923-1924
- Karol Rybiński, Director 1923-1924

== Buildings ==
The Polish National Loan Bank operated in Warsaw from the former branch building of the State Bank of the Russian Empire, erected in 1908–1911 on a design by architect Leon Benois on the site of the former Polish mint.

In Kraków, the bank in 1921 commissioned a new building from architect Kazimierz Wyczyński, who died in 1923 and was replaced by Teodor Hoffmann. The building was completed in 1925. The branch building In Siedlce was similarly commissioned from noted architect Marian Lalewicz, and completed in 1924.

In other localities, the bank generally repurposed former branches of the Reichsbank, as in Bydgoszcz, Katowice or Toruń, or of the Russian State Bank, as in Łódź, Lublin, or Vilnius.

== See also ==
- Darlehnskasse Ost
- Bank of Issue in Poland
- List of banks in Germany
- List of banks in Poland
