= Darlehnskasse Ost =

German wartime money-issuing institution

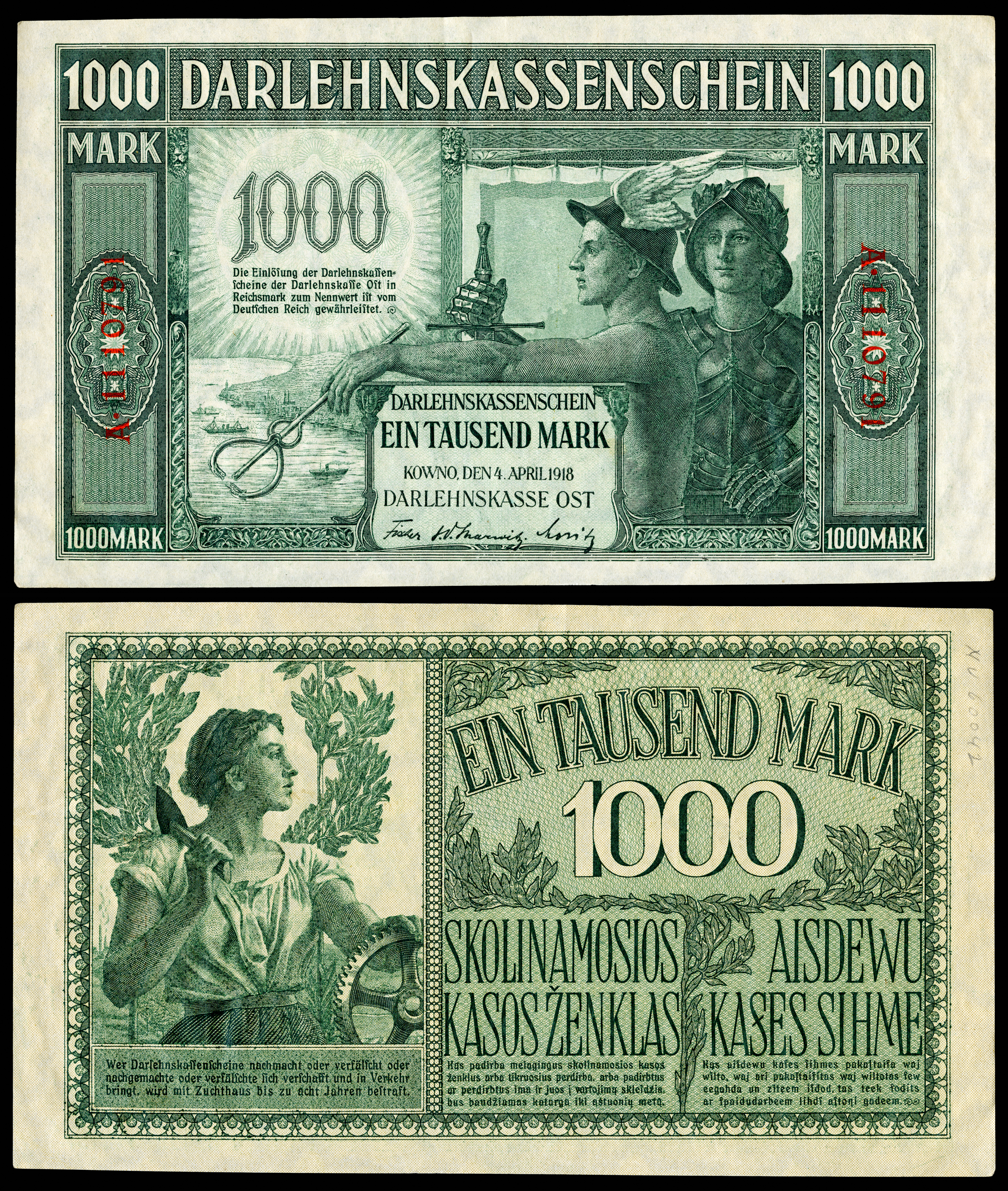
1000-mark note issued by the Darlehnskasse Ost, 1918, with inscriptions in German, Lithuanian and Latvian

The Darlehnskasse Ost (lit. 'Loan Bank East') was a German financial institution that issued money at the end of World War I and in its immediate aftermath. Initially established in April 1916, it was replaced in 1917 by the Polish National Loan Bank in the Kingdom of Poland, in 1919 by ruble-denominated government notes in Latvia, and only in 1922 by the Bank of Lithuania in Lithuania.

== Overview ==
Under the Hague Convention of 1907, the German military occupation authorities in territories conquered from the Russian Empire, known as Ober Ost, were bound to maintain circulation of the pre-existing currency, namely the ruble. In April 1916, the Ober Ost directed Poznań-based Ostbank für Handel und Gewerbe, one of the largest commercial banks in eastern Germany, to establish a Darlehnskasse in Kaunas, then known as Kauen or Kovno in German-occupied Lithuania, to serve the prior Russian governorates of Suwałki, Kovno, Vilna, Grodno, and Courland. The Ostbank's Darlehnskasse was to issue notes denominated in so-called ostrubel (lit. 'eastern ruble') backed by a mix of reichsmark banknotes, short-term Treasury bills, and credit balances with German banks. In December 1916, the Polish National Loan Bank was established to issue currency (the Polish marka) in the Ober Ost's puppet Kingdom of Poland, but the Ostbank's Darlehnskasse kept serving other occupied territories.

In January 1918, the Darlehnskasse's operations were transferred from Ostbank to direct military control by Ober Ost, under the name Darlehnskasse Ost. The Reich directly guaranteed the redemption of the notes into German ostmarks, at the rate of two marks to one ruble. At the end of the war in November 1918, there were one billion such ostmarks in circulation. After the newly independent country of Lithuania was established with capital in Kaunas, it kept relying on the Darlehnskasse Ost albeit adopting a vernacular name, auksinas (lit. 'golden'), for the ostmark. Only in 1922 was the Darlehnskasse Ost replaced by a national bank of issue, the Bank of Lithuania.

== See also ==
- Bank of Issue in Poland
- List of banks in Germany
