= Lithuanian auksinas =

Former currency of Lithuania

The auksinas (derived from auksas, Lithuanian for gold) was the name of two currencies of Lithuania: silver coin minted in 1564 equal to 30 Lithuanian groschens and paper German ostmark banknotes that circulated in Lithuania in the aftermath of World War I.

== First auksinas (1564–65) ==
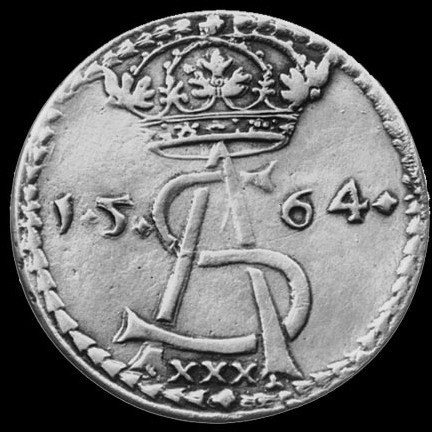
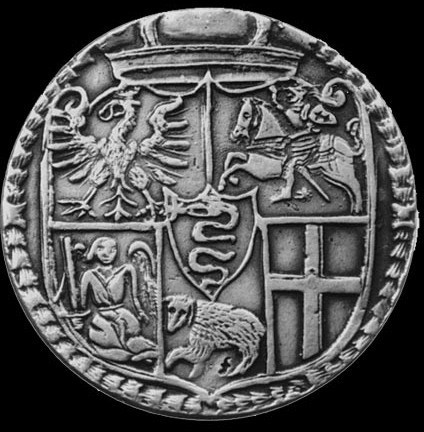
Auksinas (puskapė or taleris) minted in 1564

The first auksinas, equivalent to the Polish złoty, was minted in 1564–65 at the Lithuanian Mint by Sigismund II Augustus. Since it was equal to 30 Lithuanian groschens, it was also known as puskapė (half-kopa). Among merchants, they are also known as taleris (from thaler) or guldenas (from gulden). The coin weighted about 27.86 grams (0.983 oz) and measured 40 millimetres (1.6 in) in diameter with silver content of about 73%. Due to the Livonian War, the coins were debased: according to the traditions, 30 groschens were equal to about 26 grams (0.92 oz) of silver, while auksinas had only about 20.47 grams (0.722 oz) of silver.

The coins had two different appearances in 1564 and 1565. On the obverse, both coins had royal monogram SA (Sigismund Augustus), year of mintage, and denomination (XXX or 30). The averse (reverse) initially had six coats of arms: Polish eagle, Lithuanian vytis, snake of Sforza (Augustus' mother), Archangel Michael of Kiev, bear of Samogitia, and cross of Volhynia. The following year the coats of arms were replaced by a bust of Sigismund Augustus.

== Experimental coin (1666) ==
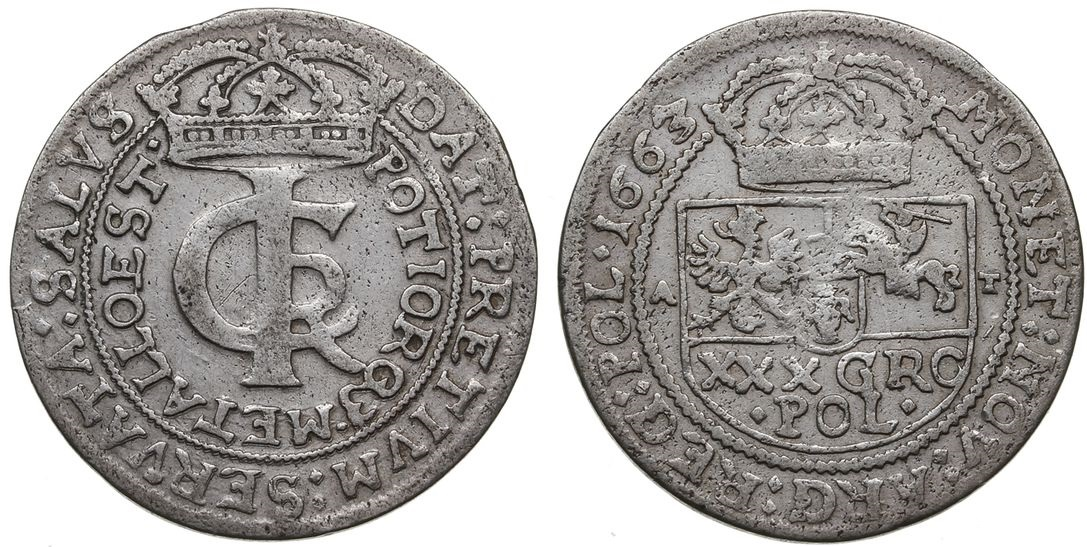
Polish tymf

In 1666, during the Russo-Polish War (1654–67), an experimental auksinas was minted at the Lithuanian Mint. It was a silver coin of very low quality: silver was only about 50% of its mass. It measured about 33 millimetres (1.3 in) in diameter and weighted about 6.72 grams (0.237 oz). Officially, it was worth 30 groschens, while its real value was only about 12 groschens. It was equivalent to the so-called tymf coins minted at the Bydgoszcz Mint in 1663–66. The only difference was in the coat of arms on the reverse: instead of the coat of arms of the Commonwealth, it showed only the Lithuanian vytis. The obverse had the royal monogram ICR (Ioannes Casimirus Rex for John II Casimir Vasa) and a patriotic slogan DAT PRETIVM SERVATA SALVS POTIOR Q(am) METALLO EST (rescue of the homeland is valued more than metal), while the averse (reverse) had MONET(a) NOV(a) ARG(entea) LITVANIA(e) (new silver Lithuanian coin). This auksinas was never mass-produced and the only surviving specimen is kept by the Hermitage Museum in Saint Petersburg.

== Second auksinas (1919–22) ==
Ostmarks in circulation
Date	Millions of notes in circulation	Value in litas^{a}
1917	125.75	186.77
1918 (March 31)	165.65	327.30
1918 (Dec. 31)	290.9	363.62
1920 (July)	546.8	138.50
1921 (July)	779.8	101.70
1922 (July)	2,000	63.00
1922 (Sept.)	3,000	17.00
^{a} 1 litas = 0.150462 grams of gold

During World War I, Germany established Ober Ost (also Obost) in the occupied territories of the former Russian Empire. It circulated special currency, German ostmark and German ostrubel (collectively known as ostgeld), administered by Darlehnskasse Ost. After the German surrender, other countries hastily introduced their own currencies (Latvian rouble, Estonian mark, Polish mark) to replace the now-obsolete ostmark. On December 31, 1918, the Lithuanian government signed an agreement with Germany that it will continue to honor ostmark without structural changes to the fiscal regime. In exchange, Lithuania received a much-needed loan of 100 million marks at 5% annual interest to finance its newly formed state institutions and army at the outbreak of the Lithuanian–Soviet War. The agreement was signed by Antanas Smetona and Martynas Yčas on the Lithuanian side and by Fischer and von Roy, directors of Darlehnskasse Ost, on the German side.

On February 26, 1919, Lithuania officially renamed ostmark as auksinas and pfennig as skatikas (1/100 of auksinas). The notes were continued to be printed and administered by Darlehnskasse Ost. The exchange rate was set 1:1 with German Papiermark which meant that auksinas was guaranteed by the Weimar Republic. As such, auksinas was subject to the same high inflation that plagued the Weimar Republic. Various Russian revolutionary money that circulated unofficially were also subject to high inflation in Soviet Russia. Lithuania was flooded by cheap paper money that was used to buy Lithuanian goods and raw materials further crippling Lithuanian economy. Under such circumstances, Lithuania needed to establish its own currency. It melted 3 million gold roubles received according to the Soviet–Lithuanian Peace Treaty of July 1920 to establish its own gold reserves. It was then able to introduce fully gold-backed Lithuanian litas on October 2, 1922. The exchange rate was allowed to fluctuate with the market. The initial exchange rate of 175 auksinas for 1 litas dropped to 850 auksinas by the end of the year.
