= Bank of Poland =

Bank of Poland may refer to:

- Bank Polski, bank of issue in Congress Poland (1828–1885)
- Bank Polski SA, central bank of the Second Polish Republic (1924–1939)
- Bank of Issue in Poland, central bank of the Polish General Government under Nazi occupation (1940–1945)
- National Bank of Poland, central bank of Poland since 1945

== See also ==
- PKO Bank Polski, a commercial bank
