= Latvian ruble =

Former currency of Latvia

Latvian ruble (1992–1993 below)
Latvijas rublis (Latvian)

ISO 4217
- Code: LVR

Unit
- Symbol: LR

Denominations
- Banknotes: LR 1, LR 2, LR 5, LR 10, LR 20, LR 50, LR 100, LR 200, LR 500
- Coins: none

Demographics
- Replaced: Soviet ruble (1 LVR = 1 SUR)
- Replaced by: Latvian lats (1 LVL = 200 LVR)
- User(s): Latvia

Issuance
- Central bank: Bank of Latvia
- Website: www.bank.lv
- This infobox shows the latest status before this currency was rendered obsolete.

The Latvian ruble (Latvian: Latvijas rublis) was the name of two currencies of Latvia: the Latvian ruble, in use from 1919 to 1922, and the second Latvian ruble, in use from 1992 to 1993.

== First Latvian ruble (no currency code) ==
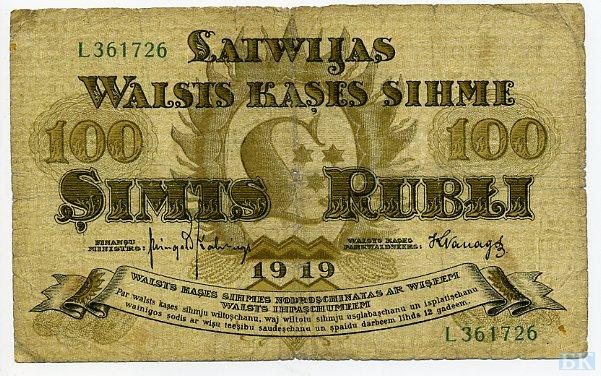
Averse of 100 rubļi issued by the Latvian Provisional Government in 1919

After the proclamation of the Republic of Latvia in 1918, a great variety of different currencies were in circulation: ostrubels, ostmarks, papiermarks, the so-called Tsar rubles, the so-called Duma Money, as well as promissory notes issued by several town municipalities.

On 4 February 1919, the Latvian Provisional Government authorized the Minister of Finance to issue the first currency notes of the Republic of Latvia: Treasury notes. They were denominated in rubles (Latvian: rublis, plural: rubļi or rubłı) and kopecks (Latvian: kapeika, plural nominative: kapeikas, plural genitive: kapeiku). On 27 March 1919 the exchange rates for the Latvian ruble were fixed at 1 ostmark, 2 papiermarks and 1.5 imperial rubles. Between April 1919 and September 1922, currency notes were issued in denominations of 5, 10, 25, and 50 kopecks and 1, 2, 5, 10, 25, 50, 100, and 500 rubles. No coins were issued.

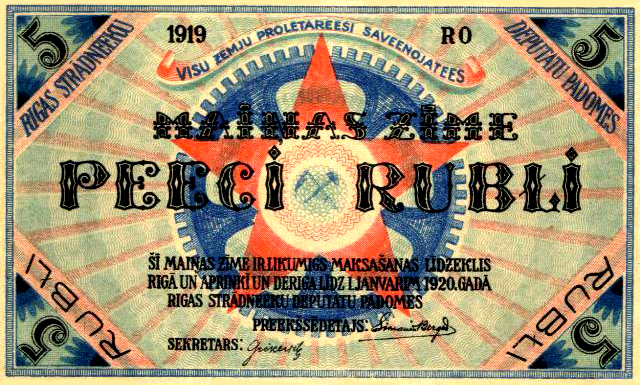
5 rubļi issued in Riga by the Latvian SSR, 1919

The first state currency notes were printed in 1919 by Andrievs Niedra's government, which was considered pro-German and illegal, and was overthrown in the same year. The legal government of Kārlis Ulmanis printed quite similar notes but with different signatures on them. This government recognized the previously printed banknotes as legal tender. The designer of these banknotes was Jūlijs Madernieks. Latvian rouble banknotes were also issued by municipalities of the Latvian Socialist Soviet Republic from 1919 to 1920.

On 3 August 1922, the Cabinet of Ministers approved the "Regulations on Money" which introduced the lats as Latvia's national currency, with one lats equalling 50 rubles. The ruble remained in circulation alongside the lats for a time.

== Second Latvian ruble (LVR) ==
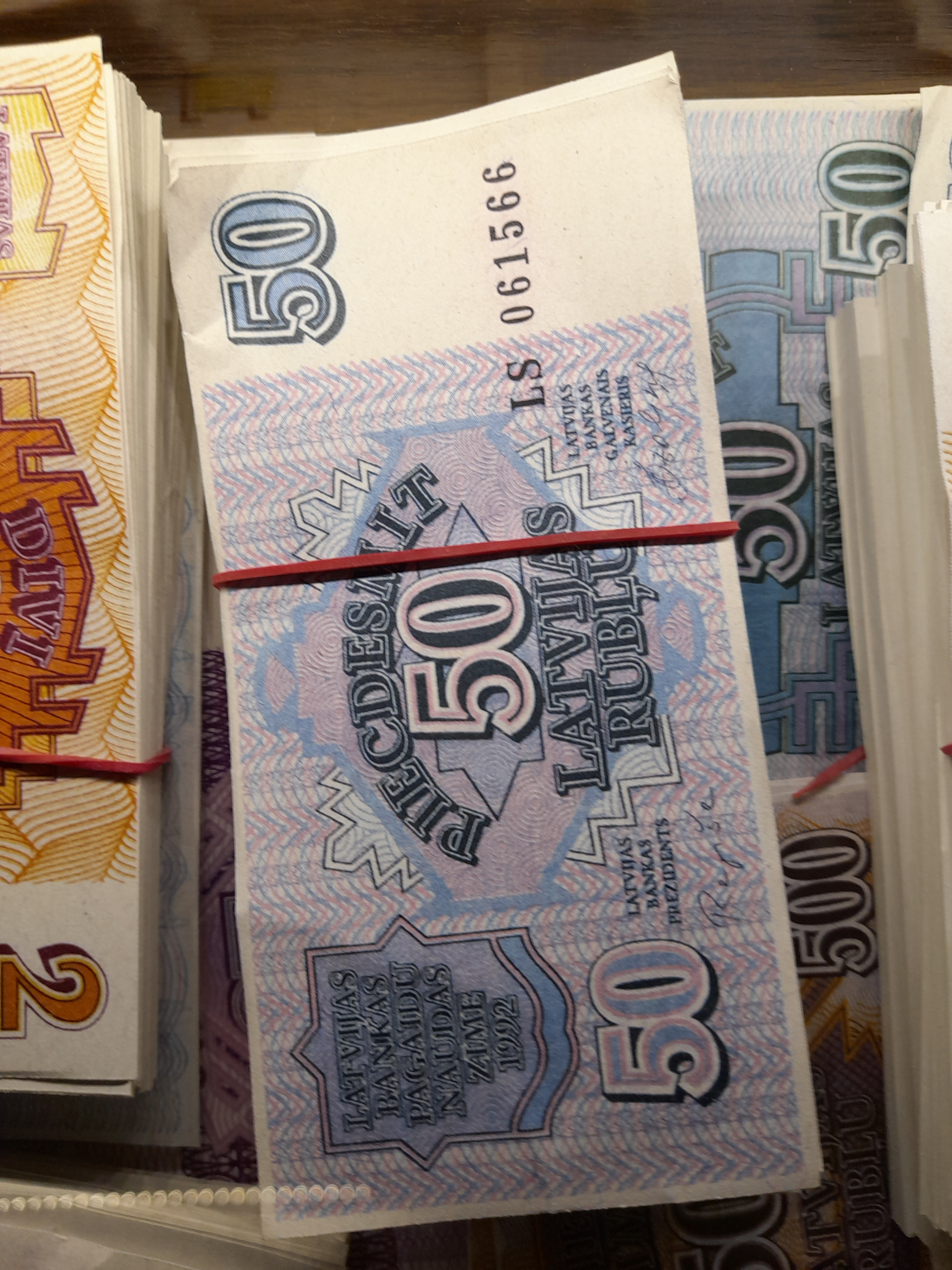
50 Latvian roubles

Latvia's regained independence was recognized by the Soviet Union on 6 September 1991. In the first four months of 1992, the country was adversely affected by inflation of the Soviet ruble. Immediate return of the lats was not an option, since it would be devalued very quickly.

To resolve the problem, on 4 May 1992, the Monetary Reform Commission of the Republic of Latvia passed a resolution "On Introduction of the Latvian ruble". From 7 May 1992, a temporary currency, the Latvian ruble (LVR), was put into circulation as a legal tender parallel to the existing ruble notes. It was declared equal in value to the Soviet ruble. Latvian ruble notes (widely known as repšiki, after the then governor of the Central Bank, Einars Repše) were issued in denominations of 1, 2, 5, 10, 20, 50, 200, and 500 rubles.

== Lats ==
The second Latvian ruble was withdrawn from circulation on 18 October 1993, but could be exchanged for lats until 1 July 1994, when it lost validity. and the historic national currency – the lats – was reintroduced in 1993, replacing the Latvian ruble at the ratio of 1 lats (LVL) = 200 rubles (LVR). On 1 January, 2014, lats was replaced by the euro at the rate of 0.702804 lats to 1 euro.

1992 Series
Image		Value	Main Colour
Obverse	Reverse	Value	Main Colour
		LR 1	Yellow
		LR 2	Brown
		LR 5	Blue
		LR 10	Red
		LR 20	Violet
		LR 50	Turquoise
		LR 200	Green
		LR 500	Orange
