= Martynas Paleckis =

Polish businessman

Martynas Paleckis (? – c. 1588) was a Polish businessman and nobleman of the Grand Duchy of Lithuania, being its first glass manufacturer. He was also a marszałek.

== Biography ==
Srzeniawa Coat of Arms

Relatively little is known about Paleckis's life. His family belonged to the Szreniawa coat of arms. He was nurtured by Mikołaj "the Black" Radziwiłł. Paleckis's father Jonas Paleckis also was a glass manufacturer, who succeeded bishop John of the Lithuanian Dukes's glass business (John had established his business outside Vilnius in 1519). John transferred his business to Jonas Paleckis, a nobleman from Poland, on 4 November 1525. Martynas Paleckis also had a brother Adomas, most likely the eldest son, who inherited his father's estate outside of Vilnius. After his death, his wealth was inherited by Martynas Paleckis, who was also entrusted to take care of Adomas's two sons Stanislovas and Jonas.

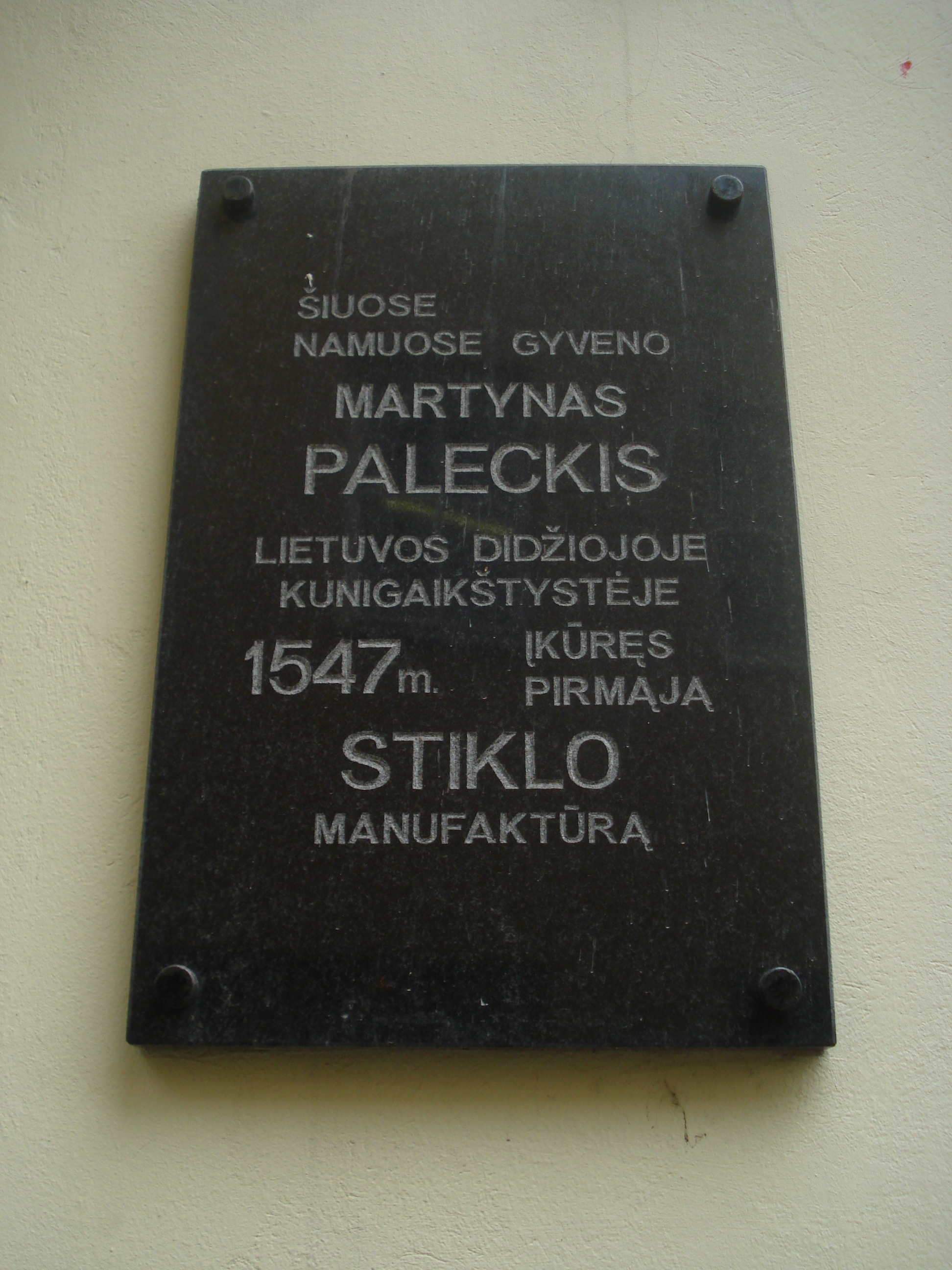
Memorial plaque at his former house

Paleckis is first mentioned in a document dated 22 May 1547, in which Sigismund Augustus gives Paleckis the privilege to establish his own glass manufactory, with the condition to provide two hundred blown glasses and two hundred smaller glasses. The privilege exempted Paleckis from tax and service. The manufactory, relatively small with space for three manufacturers and other assistants, began its work in 1552–1555. It produced colorless or almost colorless glass, bottles, window glass, and other glass products. Paleckis also moved to Vilnius, living there with his family in the Vilnius Old Town, where he established a glass shop and a storage room. After establishing a monopoly on glass, Paleckis became a reformed Protestant. Dissatisfied glass merchants, whose jobs became illegal due to the privilege, unsuccessfully tried to negotiate for a more free market. It is possible that the Paleckis's mercantile exceptions and privileges were maintained by the mediation of the Radziwiłł family. Paleckis also became the powiat of Krėva in 1551.

Paleckis gave a loan of 6,000 auksinas to Stephen Báthory, and in return received the town of Eišiškės. During Báthory's reign, merchants of Vilnius once again unsuccessfully tried to appeal for a freer market on glass, submitting a complaint to the Sejm which stated that the activities of the monopoly workshop contradicted the city's rights and freedoms. Paleckis's monopoly on glass gave rise to a black market. He complained about in 1584, stating that the people of Vilnius, Germans, Scots, and other newcomers constantly violate the 1547 the privilege by buying and selling Prussian and Polish glassware and also window glass. Paleckis, after hugely inflating the sum, estimated the damage to be worth 40,000 Groschen. Shortly after a meeting occurred in the Sejm in which Paleckis's monopoly was formally extended until his and his wife's death. However, the people of Vilnius continued to violate the agreement and the illegal trade in imported glass continued. The courts often ruled in favor of the townspeople; for example, the Rudžiai family from Vilnius were acquitted because the husband swore that he did not know that his wife had resold the glass, and she said that she had not heard anything about the ban.

At the end of his life, Paleckis was a marszałek and owner of four large manors. He established his own family graveyard in Eišiškės. He died before 1588.

== Remembrance ==
A memorial plaque was uncovered at Paleckis's former home in 2000. President Valdas Adamkus was one of the people present in the uncovering ceremony.
