= Feliks Młynarski =

Polish banker, philosopher and economist

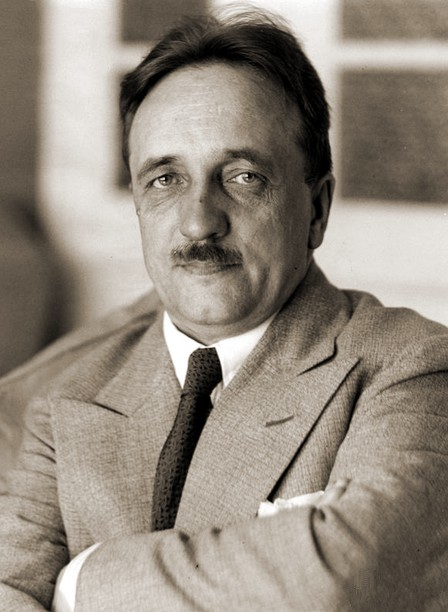
Feliks Młynarski

Feliks Młynarski (20 November 1884 – 13 April 1972) was a Polish banker, philosopher and economist.

== Biography ==
Feliks Młynarski was born to Jan Młynarski, a school teacher, and Honorate née Dziurzyńska. He attended a gymnasium in Jarosław, but because of his involvement in organizing meetings in favor of Polish independence, he was expelled by the Austrian authorities, and had to finish his secondary education at a school in Sanok, in 1903.

Młynarski finished the Jagiellonian University in Poland. As a youth, he was active in the endecja movement, but broke ranks with it prior to World War I due to its leader Roman Dmowski's pro-Russian orientation. In 1914 he joined Polish Legions, and spent some time in the United States recruiting members for the Legions from among the American Polonia.

After the war he joined the newly formed government of the Second Polish Republic. In the years 1921–1923 he directed the Emigration Office. From 1923 he was employed at the Ministry of Finance, and the following year he became the director of the Currency Department of the Ministry. He took part in the Grabski Monetary Reform of 1924, which ended hyperinflation in interwar Poland and was a co-creator of the Bank of Poland for which he served as vice-president between September 1924 and September 1929. In the years 1925–1927 he helped negotiated several economic agreements between Poland and the United States. He fell out of favor with the sanacja government of Józef Piłsudski and resigned from governmental positions in 1929. In the 1930s he taught at the Warsaw Trade Academy, and consulted for the League of Nations on currency issues.

During World War II he became, with the approval of the Polish Government in exile, the president of the German operated Bank of Issue in Poland. As a result, the currency notes used during the occupation were popularly known as "Młynarki", after him.

After the war, in 1945, he became a member of the Polish Academy of Sciences in People's Republic of Poland. Between 1945 and 1948 he taught at the Jagiellonian University in Kraków. His war time collaboration with the Germans, even though approved by the Polish underground government of that time, cast a shadow on his career, and resulted in refusal to grant him a professorship position. He also served as the director of the library of Cracow University of Economics.

== Works ==
Młynarski authored numerous works from the fields of economy, sociology and philosophy.

In his 1929 book Gold and Central Banks Młynarski identified a fundamental instability in a gold-based international monetary system: the reserve currency countries would tend to accumulate foreign reserves, but as the volume of these grew relative to the country's gold reserves, international investors would begin to fear suspension of convertibility. The resulting outflow of reserves could create significant worldwide deflationary pressures and possibly lead to the collapse of the gold-based system. After World War II, the same problem was identified by the Belgian economist Robert Triffin, but in relation to the Bretton Woods system and became known as the Triffin dilemma. Due to Młynarski's precedence in articulating the problem, Barry Eichengreen has suggested renaming the problem to "the Młynarski dilemma".

== Selected publications ==
In English:

- 1916 The Future of Warsaw
- 1916 The Problems of the Coming Peace
- 1925 The Genoa Resolutions and the Currency Reform in Poland
- 1926 The International Significance of the Depreciation of the Zloty in 1925
- 1926 World Question of Gold in Connection with England's Return to Parity
- 1929 Gold and Central Banks
- 1931 The Functioning of the Gold Standard
- 1933 Credit and Peace: a Way Out of the Crisis
