= Młynarki =

Banknotes of the General Government in Poland

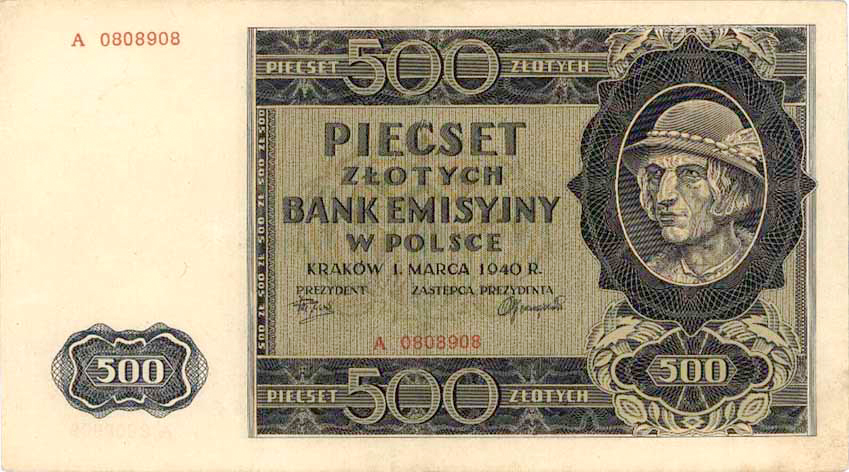
The 500 zloty note, so-called "Góral"

Młynarki [mwɨˈnarkʲi] was the popular name for the currency notes of the General Government (part of German-occupied Poland) during World War II that were issued by the German-controlled Bank of Issue in Poland. They were named after the president of the bank, Feliks Młynarski.

== History ==
After the German invasion of Poland and the ensuing occupation, the Reichsbank decided not to introduce German currency there, as it did not want to increase the money supply. Various Polish banks and credit institutions were temporarily closed, while some of their assets were nationalized by the German government. Many people lost their savings. On 15 December 1939, Hans Frank, the governor of the General Government, an administrative unit for most of occupied Poland, passed a decree creating a new bank, the Bank of Issue in Poland (Bank Emisyjny), which began operating in April 1940. The bank was headed by Feliks Młynarski with the approval of the Polish government-in-exile.

The official exchange rate was set at zl 2 for RM 1. The exchange system was meant to boost the German economy at the expense of the Polish economy. The black market exchange rate varied between three and four zlotys to one reichsmark.

The most famous of the notes was the 500 zloty note, the góral ("highlander" or "mountaineer") named after the image of a góral on its front. The note is still popular among currency collectors. Counterfeiting of the currency was rampant. The name was also reflected in one of the actions of the Polish resistance, Operation Góral, a 1943 heist in which the insurgents took over a currency shipment then worth over US$1 million. The 500 note was also the standard "unit of corruption"; the minimum bribe that representatives of the occupation authorities required to facilitate the carrying out of illicit activity. In that role, it was immortalised in a popular underground street song in Warsaw, "Siekiera, motyka".

The currency notes were used exclusively within the General Government but not the Polish areas annexed by Nazi Germany. They were withdrawn from circulation between 1944 and 1945.
