= Darlehnskasse =

German money-issuing institution

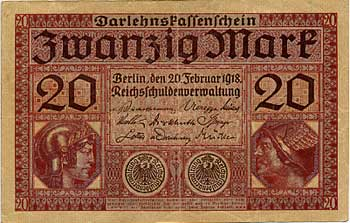
Darlehnskassenschein of February 1918

In 19th- and early 20th-century Germany, a Darlehnskasse (lit. 'loan bank') was a temporary money-issuing institution that was set up at various times in the 19th century to help governments of German states manage emergencies.

== Overview ==
Examples included the German revolutions of 1848–1849 in states that included Brunswick and Prussia, the Austro-Prussian War of 1866 and inclement weather events in East Prussia in 1868, also in Prussia; and the Franco-Prussian War in 1870, in states including Baden and Prussia.

At the start of World War I on 4 August 1914, new imperial legislation (the Darlehenskassengesetz) authorized the issuance of government notes by Darlehnskassen following the past Prussian template and under oversight of the Reichsbank. Similar arrangements were made later in 1914 in Austria-Hungary and Switzerland.

The notes issued by the Darlehenskassen, known as Darlehenskassenscheine, were not legal tender but had to be accepted by all public treasuries, making them a form of de facto currency. In post-WWI Germany, the Darlehnskassen were only terminated in 1924.

== See also ==
- Darlehnskasse Ost
