= Bank Polski SA =

Former central bank in Poland

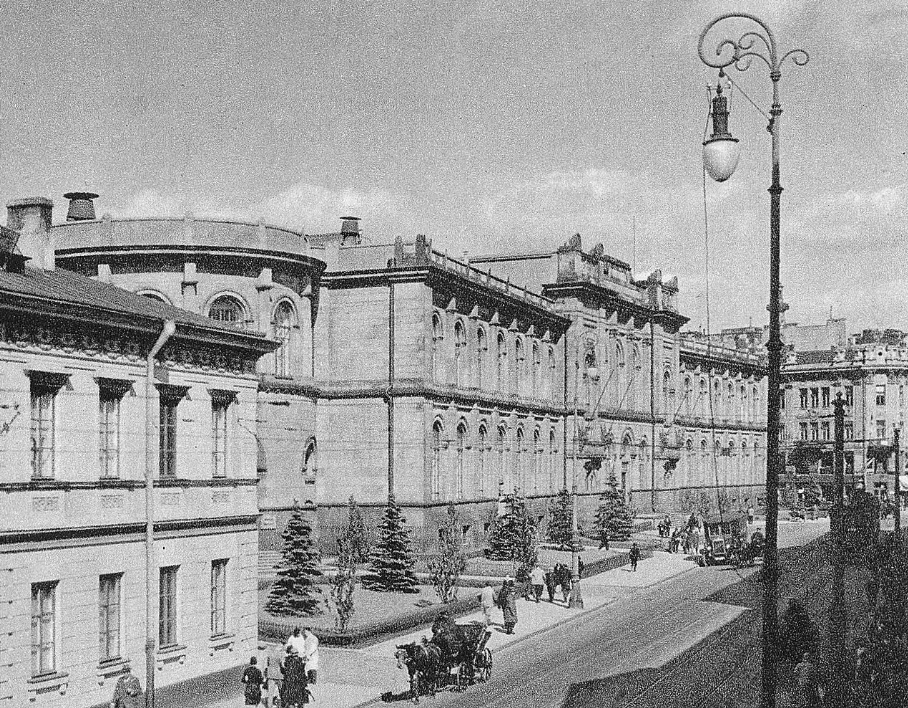
Head office in Warsaw, photographed in 1939

Bank Polski SA, full name Bank Polski Spółka Akcyjna (lit. 'Bank of Poland Joint-Stock Company'), was the central bank of the Second Polish Republic.

Bank Polski SA succeeded the Polish National Loan Bank in April 1924 and operated until the invasion of Poland in 1939, after which it relocated to London together with the Polish Government in Exile. In liberated Poland, it was replaced in 1945 by the National Bank of Poland, and was eventually liquidated in 1952.

Bank Polski SA is sometimes referred to as the "Second Bank of Poland" to distinguish it from its 19th-century namesake.

== History ==
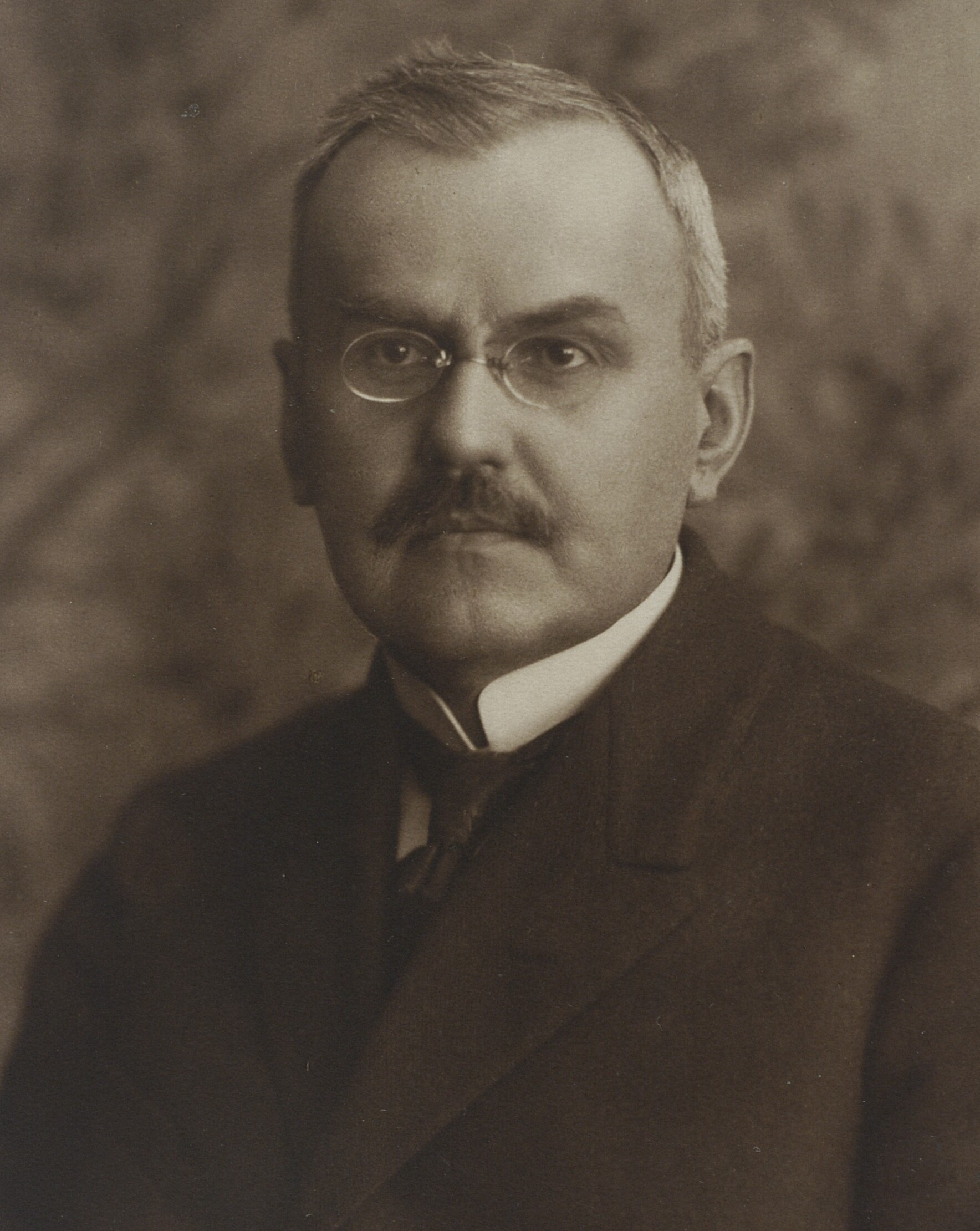
Władysław Grabski (1874–1938) was the key architect of Poland's monetary stabilization and of the creation of Bank Polski SA

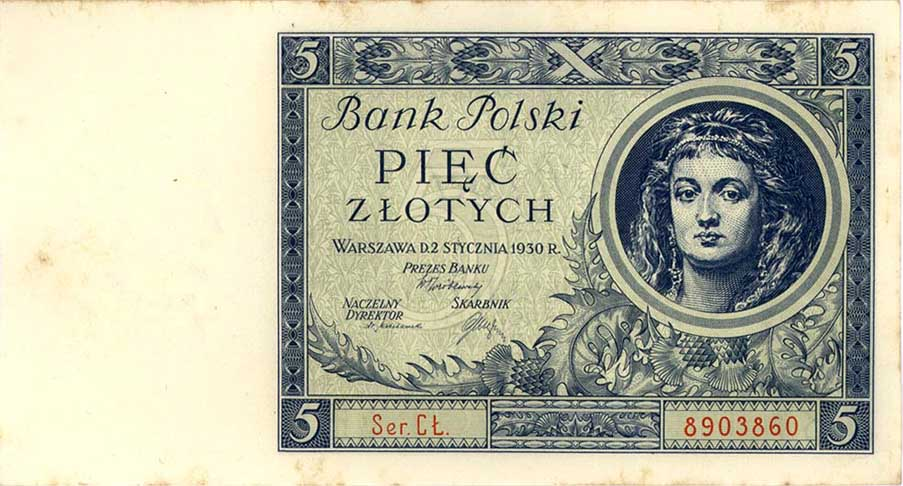
A 5-złoty banknote issued by Bank Polski (1930)

Following the State Treasury Repair Act of 11 January 1924, Prime minister Władysław Grabski undertook monetary reform, a key part of which was the establishment of the Bank of Poland, re-using the name of the 19th-century Bank Polski. Simultaneously, the new Polish złoty was introduced at a rate of one złoty for 1.8 million of the markas previously issued by the Polish National Loan Bank. The new institution, whose establishment was announced on 3 December 1923 and completed on 15 April 1924, was created as a joint stock company whose shares were offered to the Polish public. Its stock was soon raised from the initial 100,000,000 złotych to 150 million, split onto 1.5 million shares, of which the Treasury would hold only one percent. The President of Poland had the right to name the chairman and deputy chairman of the bank's board of trustees, and the Finance Minister had a veto on appointments to the bank's Council.

The 1924 reforms were largely but not entirely successful, as the government kept increasing the money supply by minting coins, triggering so-called "coinage inflation" in 1925–1926. On 30 July 1925, the Bank Polski was forced to suspend the free convertibility of złotys into US dollars. Convertibility into gold was re-established on 15 October 1927, more than a year after the May 1926 Coup which had brought back Józef Piłsudski to executive power.

At least 30 percent of the bank's money issuance was to be backed by gold (and a smaller amount by silver) and foreign currencies. After the reform of 1927, this threshold was increased to 40 percent. The dividend paid to shareholders could not exceed 8 percent. When the profit was between 8 and 12 percent, half went to the State Treasury and the other half to shareholders as a superdividend. Above 12 percent, the state collected two thirds.

Unlike in Austria, Hungary, and Danzig, which had similarly experienced postwar hyperinflation, Poland's stabilization was achieved without assistance from the League of Nations through its Economic and Financial Organization. This was partly linked to the lingering territorial disputes between Poland and Germany, and to the fact that Polish authorities feared that the United Kingdom would exercise its leverage at the League of Nations to favor German interests. Indeed, a loan proposal was secretly made by the League to Poland in February 1925, and rejected. Nevertheless, the government took advice from a foreign advisor, Briton E. Hilton Young, for the design of the Bank Polski, and in 1927 it appointed a foreign advisor to be a member of the bank's Council, taking inspiration from the League's stabilization programs. The first such foreign adviser, appointed in November 1927, was Charles S. Dewey, previously United States Assistant Secretary of the Treasury for Fiscal Affairs.

Prior to the invasion of Poland in 1939, at the initiative of Ignacy Matuszewski and Henryk Floyar-Rajchman, the Bank of Poland evacuated all of its gold reserves (105,000 kg) from Poland to the Bank of France in Paris, through Romania, Turkey and Syria, and then most of it to Canada and the Bank of England in London. Following the invasion, the Bank of Poland relocated, first in Paris from 19 September 1939 to 1 July 1940, then in London together with the Polish Government in Exile, and financed most of the latter's military effort. Meanwhile, in occupied Poland, the Third Reich in 1940 created the Bank of Issue in Poland for its General Government, issuing the so-called German "Kraków-złoty". In other parts of the former Polish territory, central banking was taken over respectively by the Nazi German Reichsbank and Soviet Gosbank.

Similarly to other Allied Military Currency bank notes, American "Liberation banknotes" for Poland were printed in 1944. On 15 January 1945, the new communist authorities of Poland founded the National Bank of Poland (NBP).

In 1946, the bank's governor Bohdan Winiarski led the decision to move the institution back to Warsaw. A stock of gold from the bank's deposits in British, French and American banks was returned to Poland, as well as banknotes printed in Great Britain and intended for circulation in the country. However, the notes were not released into circulation because the Polish government, upon establishment of the NBP, had deprived the Bank Polski of its note-issuance privilege. The stock of gold that backed those banknotes was distributed by the communist authorities for budget expenditure in the years 1946–1958, and was partially allocated to compensation for citizens of foreign countries expropriated as a result of the Polish Act on the Nationalization of Industry. This was done by transferring appropriate deposits to the governments of the US, UK and France through clearing agreements, whereby these governments took over liabilities towards their citizens in respect of property expropriated in Poland. Eventually, the Bank Polski SA was liquidated, starting in 1951 and ending on 7 January 1952.

== Leadership ==
- Stanisław Karpiński, Governor 1924–1929
- Władysław Wróblewski, Governor 1929–1936
- Adam Koc, Governor in 1936
- Władysław Byrka, Governor 1936–1941
- Bohdan Winiarski, Governor of Bank Polski in exile 1941–1946
- Edward Drożniak, Governor of Bank Polski in liquidation 1946–1952

== Head office building ==
Like the Polish National Loan Bank which it replaced, Bank Polski SA both operated in Warsaw from the former branch building of the State Bank of the Russian Empire, erected in 1908–1911 on a design by architect Leon Benois on the site of the former Polish mint. During Nazi occupation, it was used by the Bank of Issue in Poland even though it was no longer the head office. It was not reconstructed following the destructions of World War II. In the 2010s, the Senator office complex was built on the footprint of the former Bank of Poland building and incorporated some of its surviving architectonic elements. It hosts the Warsaw office of Polish petrochemical company Orlen, which is headquartered in nearby Płock.

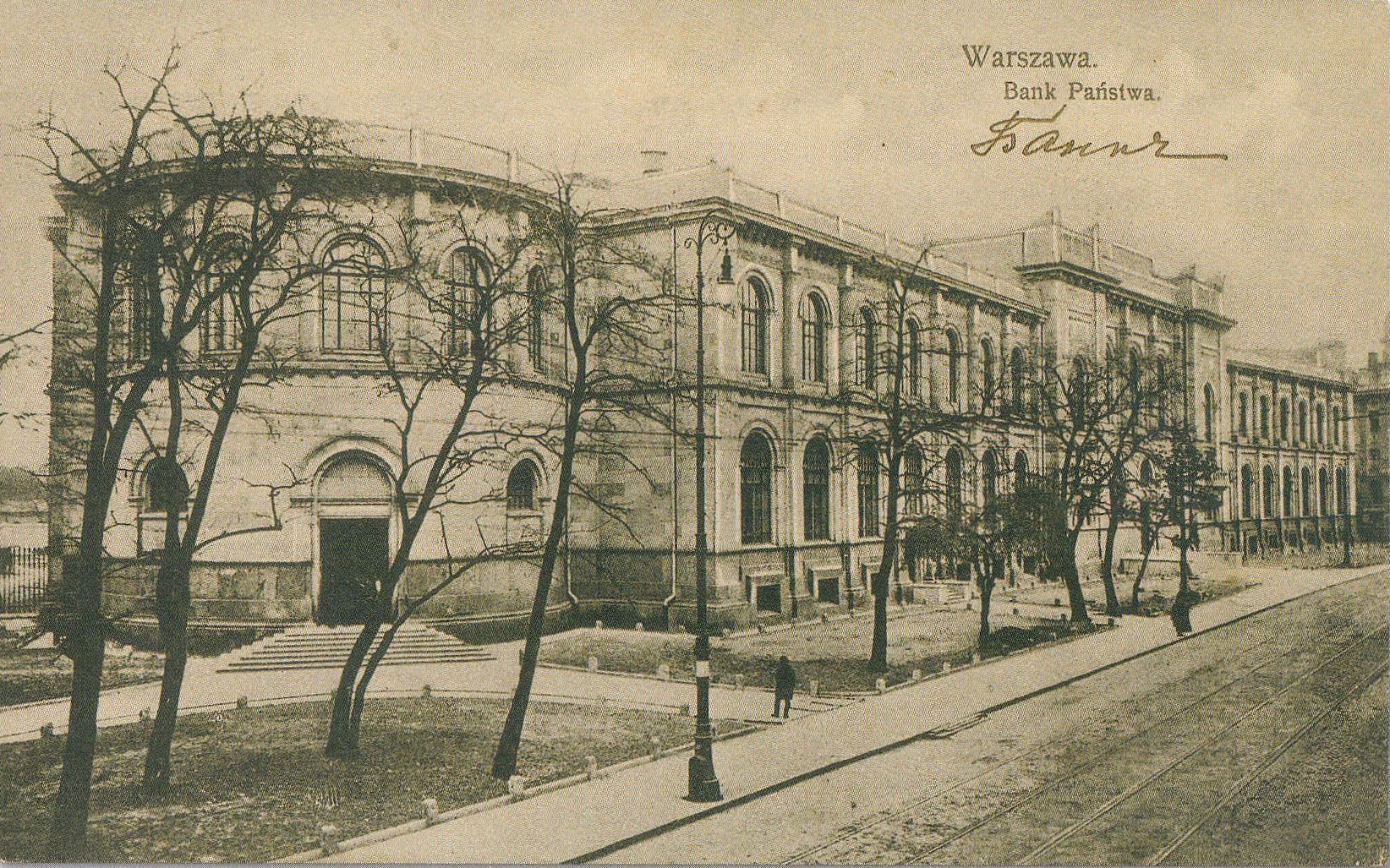
Warsaw branch of the State Bank of the Russian Empire, c. 1911

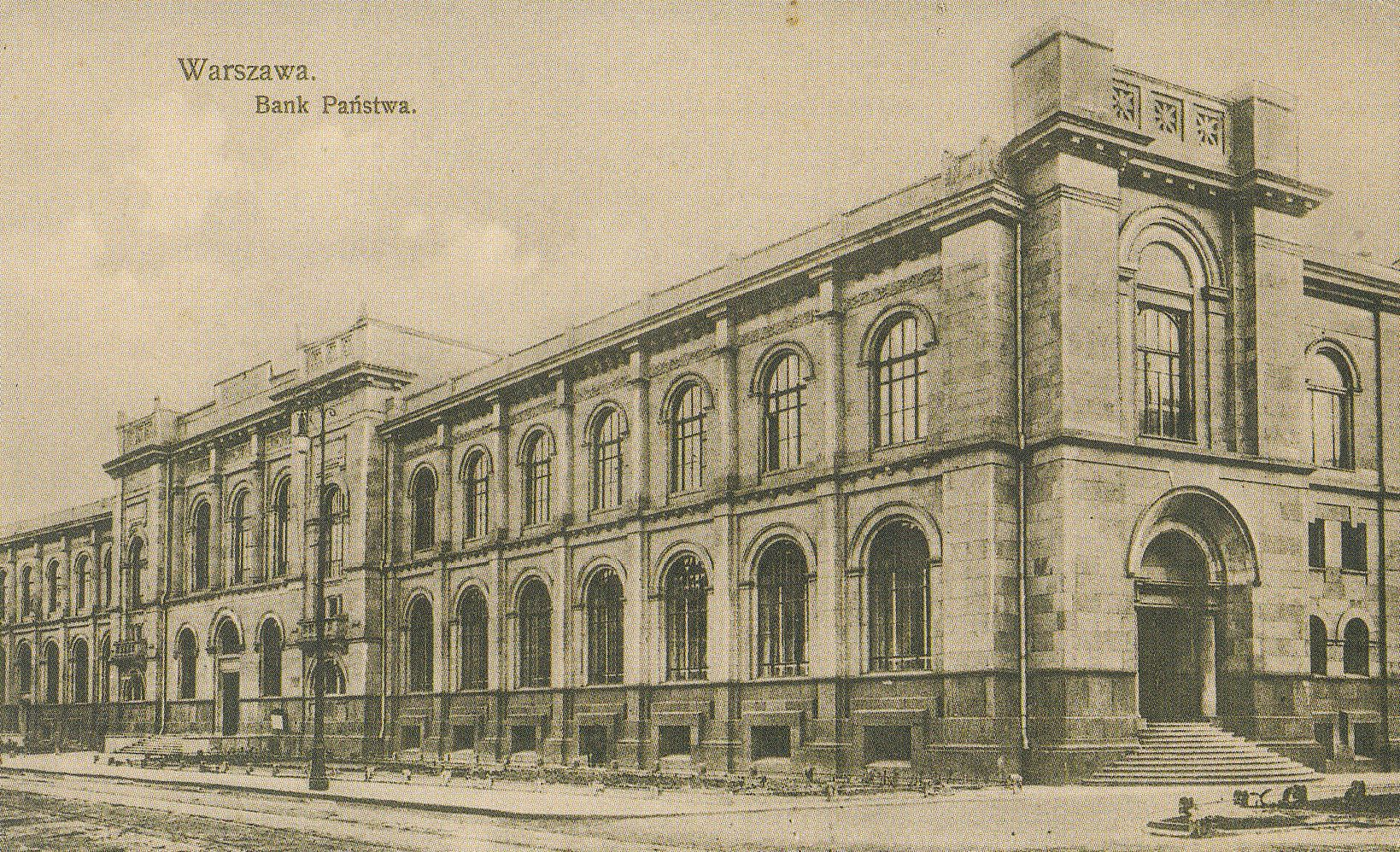
Side view of the same building, c. 1911

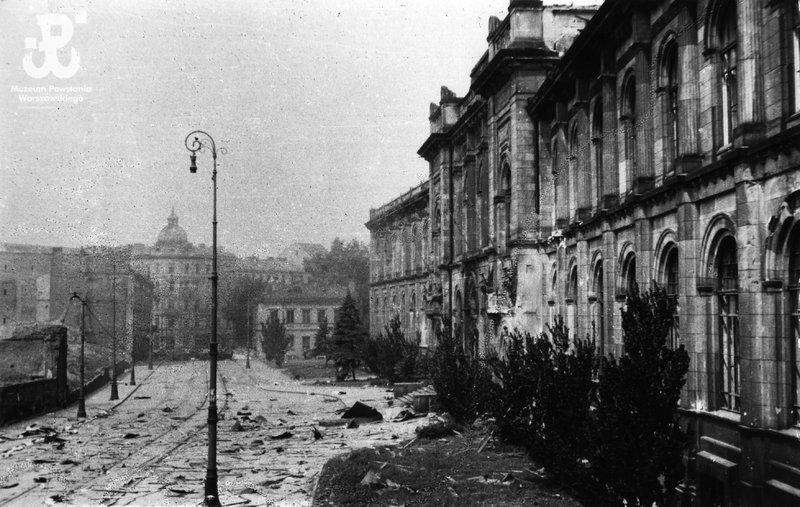
Damaged façade in 1944, before partial demolition

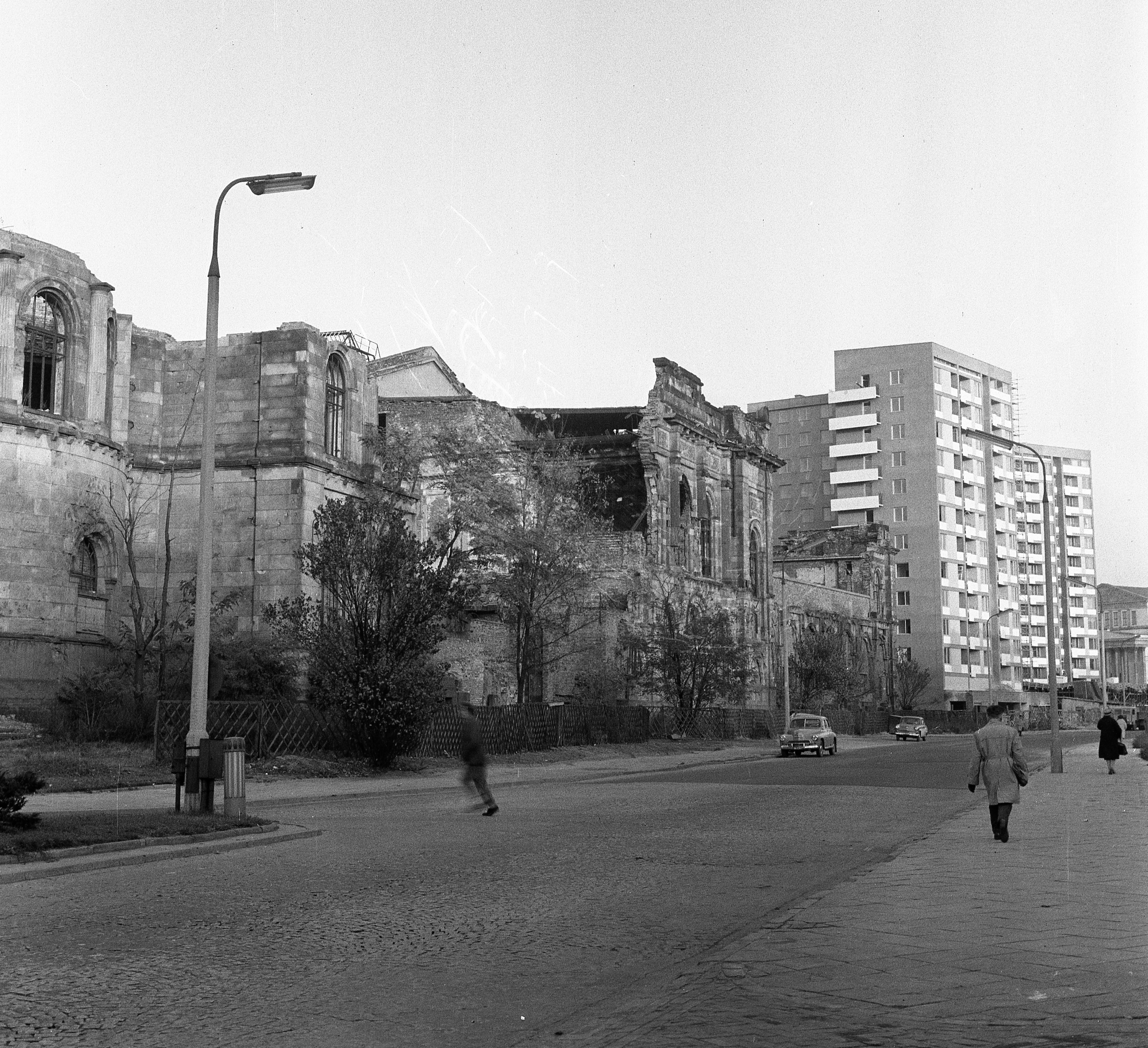
The ruined façade in 1965

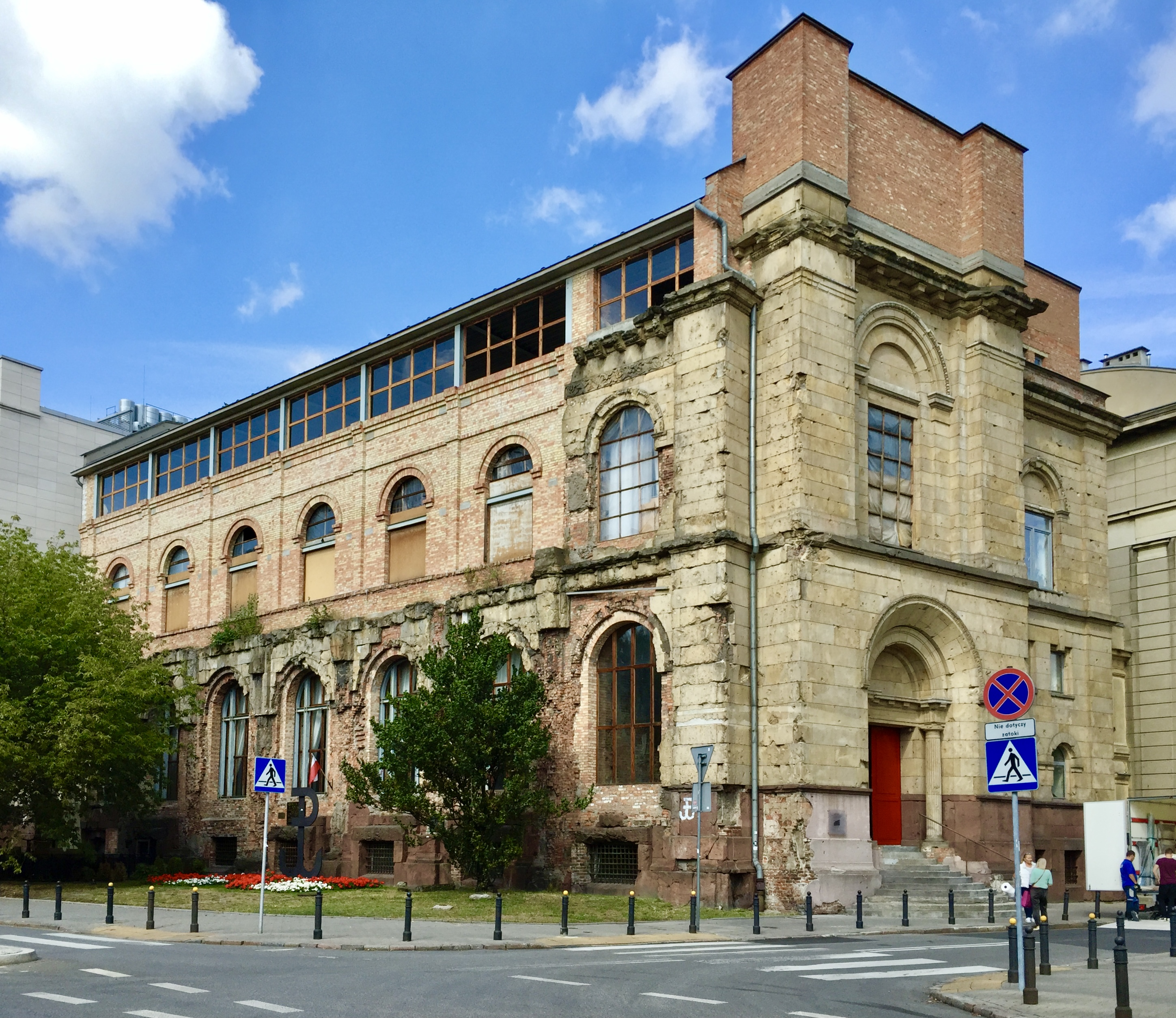
Remains of the building restored as part of the Senator office complex, 2015

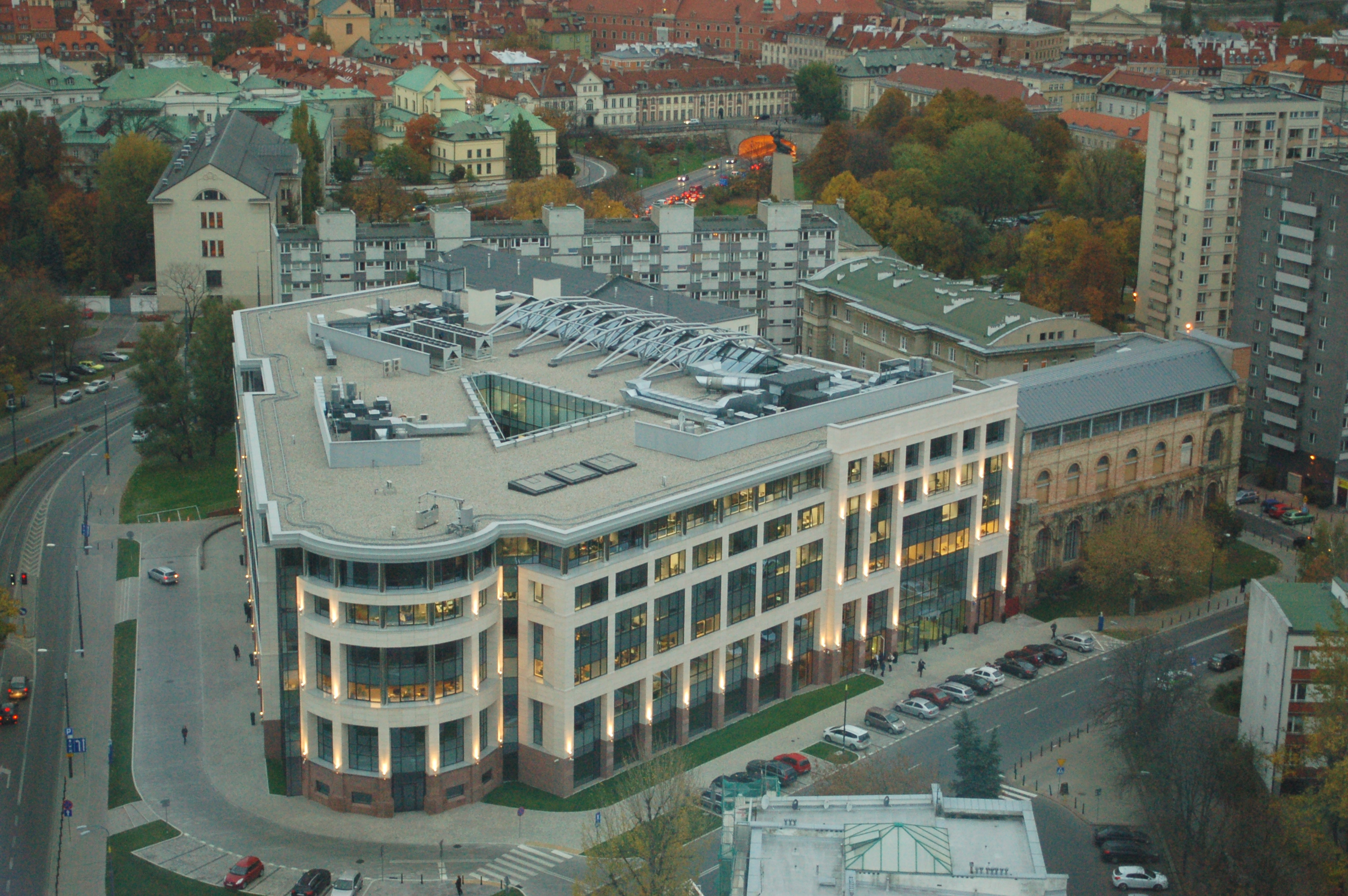
Aerial view of Senator office complex, with Bank Polski building remains on the right

== See also ==
- Bank Polski
- List of banks in Poland
- List of central banks
