= German ostmark =

Ostmark (German) ostmarka (Polish) idamark (Estonian) остмарка (Russian) ostmarkė (Lithuanian)
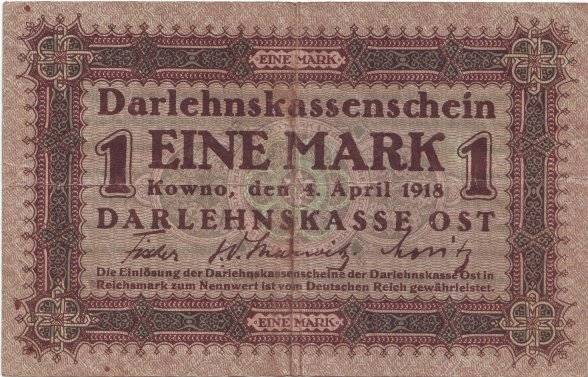

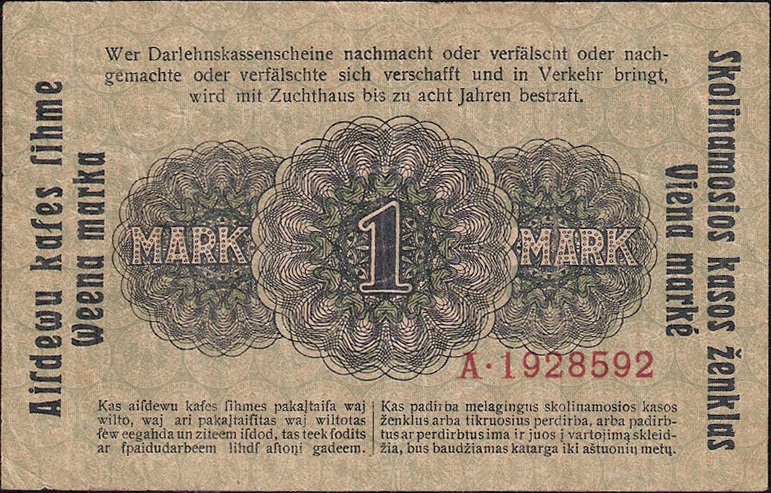

Unit
- Symbol: ℳ

Denominations
- Subunit
- 1/100: pfennig (German) fenig, fenigów (Polish) feniņš (Latvian)
- Banknotes: 1/2ℳ, 1ℳ, 2ℳ, 5ℳ, 20ℳ, 50ℳ, 100ℳ, 1,000ℳ

Demographics
- Date of introduction: 4 April 1918
- Date of withdrawal: 1922
- Official user(s): (German Empire) Ober Ost; Duchy of Courland and Semigallia; United Baltic Duchy
- Unofficial users: Lithuania (1918–22); Estonia (1918–19)

Issuance
- Central bank: Darlehnskasse Ost, Kowno
- This infobox shows the latest status before this currency was rendered obsolete. Circulated alongside German Ostrubel, with 2 Ostmark = 1 Ostrubel

Ostmark (German: [ˈɔstmaʁk]) is the name given to a currency denominated in Mark which was issued by Germany in 1918 for use in a part of the eastern areas under German control at that time, the Ober Ost area. The currency consisted of paper money issued on 4 April 1918 by the Darlehnskasse Ost in Kowno (Kaunas) and was equal to the German Papiermark. The Ostmark circulated alongside the Imperial rouble and the Ostrubel, with two Ostmark equal to one Ostrubel.

== Denominations ==
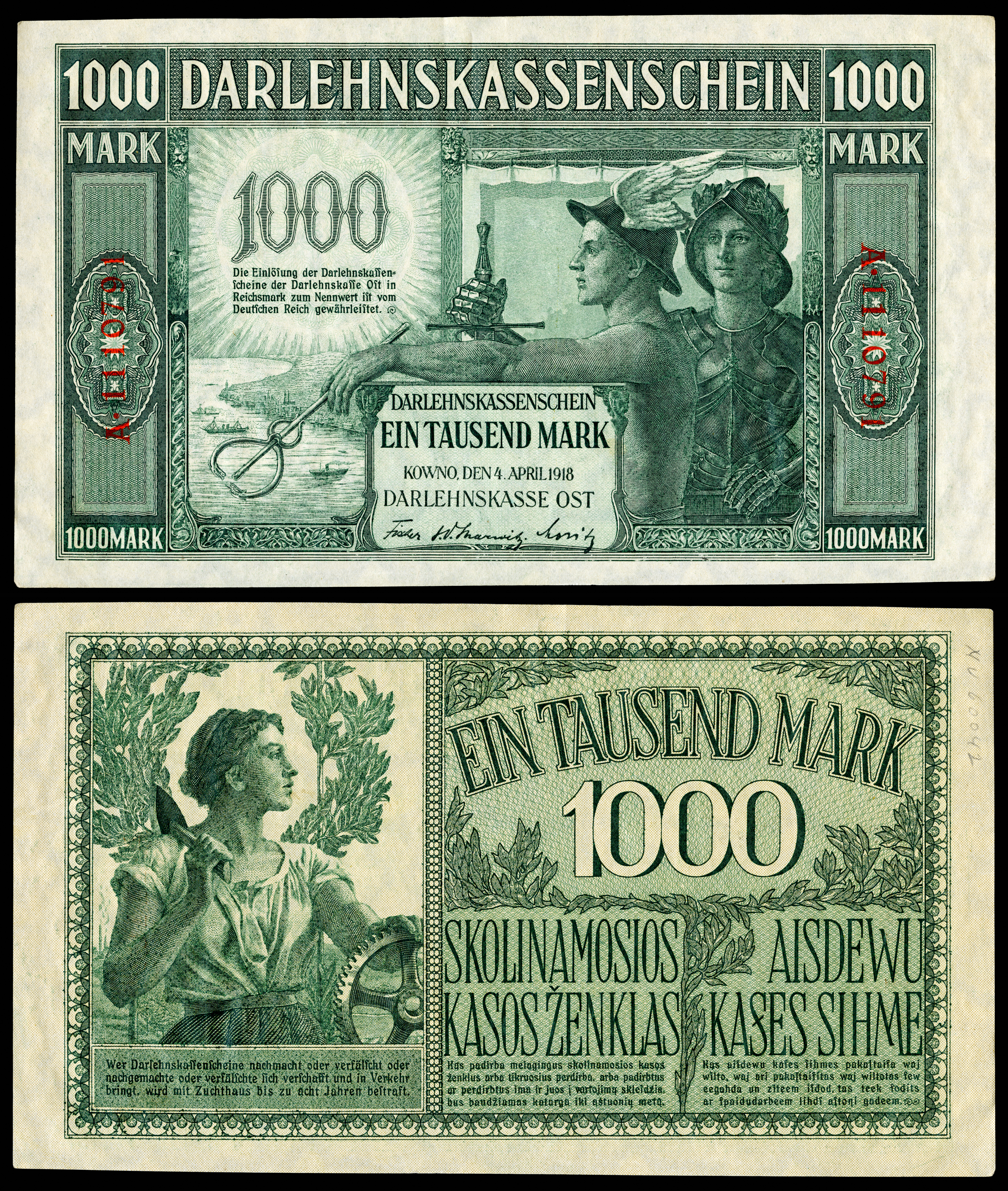
1,000 Ostmark from Lithuania, 1918

The denominations available were:

- 1/2 mark;
- 1 mark;
- 2 marks;
- 5 marks;
- 20 marks;
- 50 marks;
- 100 marks;
- 1000 marks.

The reverse sides of the Darlehnskassenscheine carry a warning against forging banknotes in German, Latvian and Lithuanian.

== Aftermath ==
The Ostmark and Ostrubel continued to circulate in Lithuania from the end of World War I until 1 October 1922, when they were replaced by the litas. The names skatikas and auksinas were used for Pfennig and Mark, for example, on postage stamps. The reason for the replacement was the link to the Papiermark, which already suffered from inflation (and would spiral into hyperinflation in 1923). The litas was pegged to the U.S. dollar.

== Bibliography ==
- Gerhard Hahne, Die Inflation der Markwährungen und das postalische Geschehen im litauisch-polnischen Raum, Forschungsgemeinschaft Litauen im Bund Deutscher Philatelisten e.V., Uetze, (1996) (in German)
- N. Jakimovs and V. Marcilger, The Postal and Monetary History of Latvia 1918–1945, own book, 1991, pp. 14–13 - 14–15.
