= Polish marka =

Former currency of Poland

marka polska (Polish)
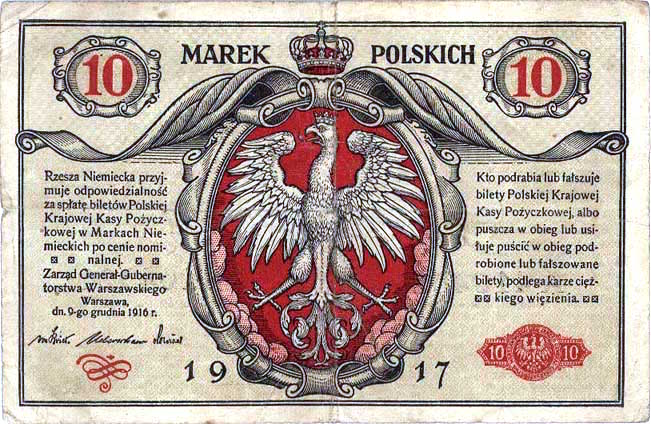
- Mp 10 banknote of 1917

Units of account
- Plural: The language(s) of this currency belong(s) to the Slavic languages. There is more than one way to construct plural forms.
- Symbol: Mp
- Subunit
- 1/100: fenig
- Symbol
- fenig: f

Denominations
- Banknotes: Mp 1/2, Mp 1, Mp 2, Mp 5, Mp 10, Mp 20, Mp 50, Mp 100, Mp 500, Mp 1,000, Mp 5,000, Mp 10,000, Mp 50,000, Mp 100,000, Mp 250,000, Mp 500,000, Mp 1,000,000, Mp 5,000,000, Mp 10,000,000
- Coins: 1f, 5f, 10f, 20f

Demographics
- Date of introduction: 9 December 1917
- Replaced: Polish rouble
- Date of withdrawal: April 1924
- Replaced by: Polish złoty
- Official user(s): Kingdom of Poland (1917–1918); Second Polish Republic
- Unofficial user: Republic of Central Lithuania

Issuance
- Central bank: Polish National Loan Bank
- This infobox shows the latest status before this currency was rendered obsolete.

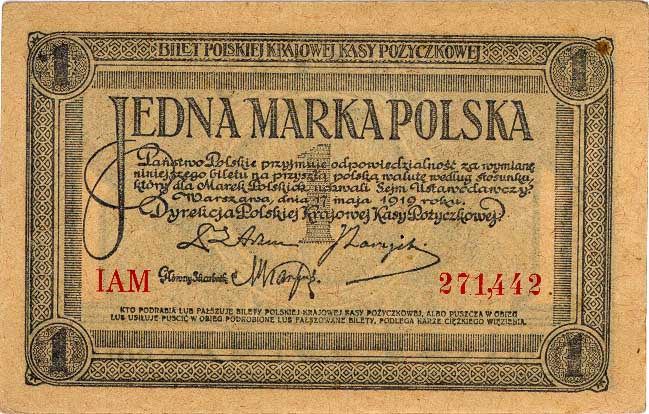
A rare example of an Mp 1 note printed in 1919, when the name and structure of the new Polish state was still not certain and was thus used the neutral phrase Polish state

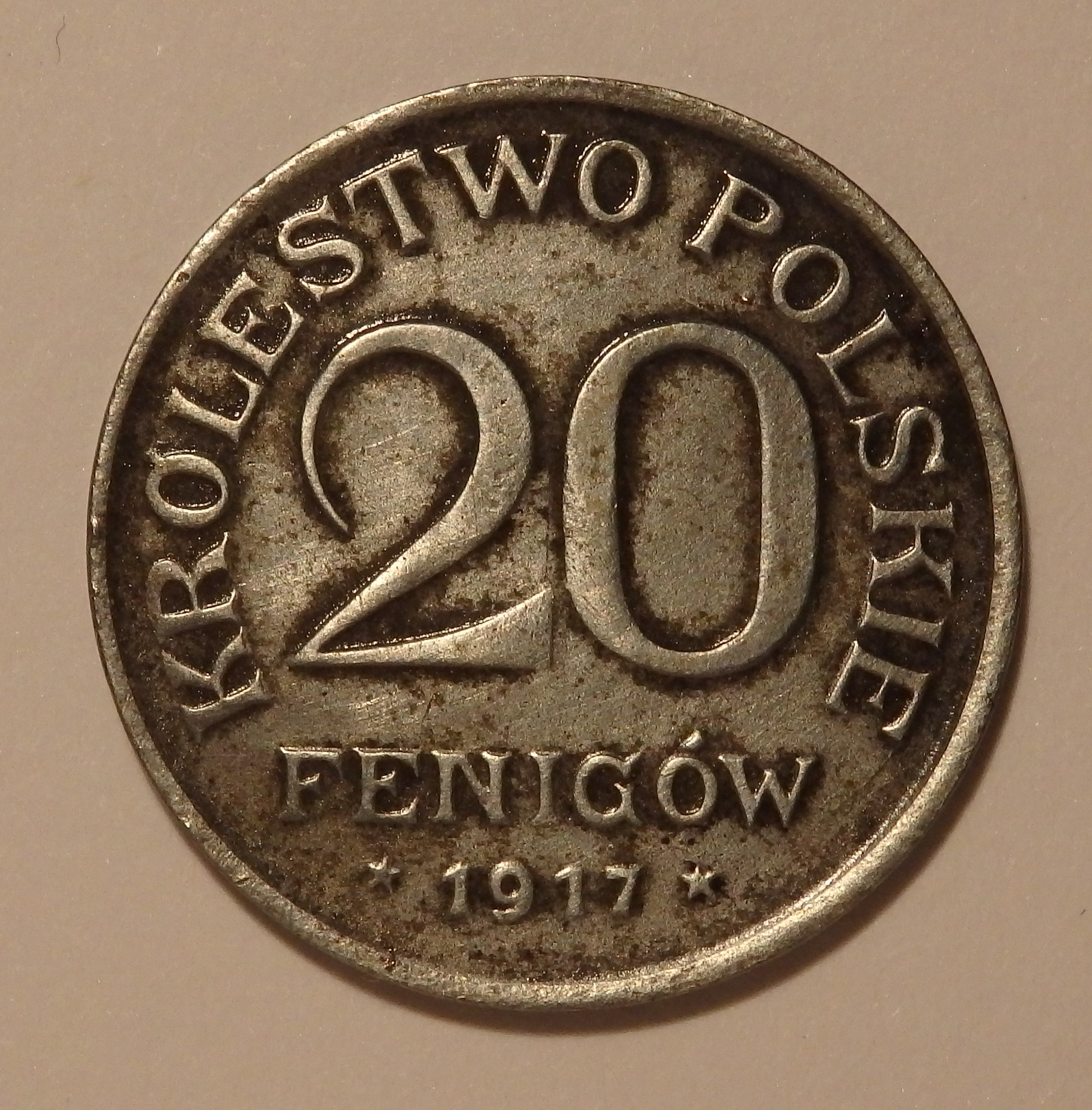
20 fenigów coin

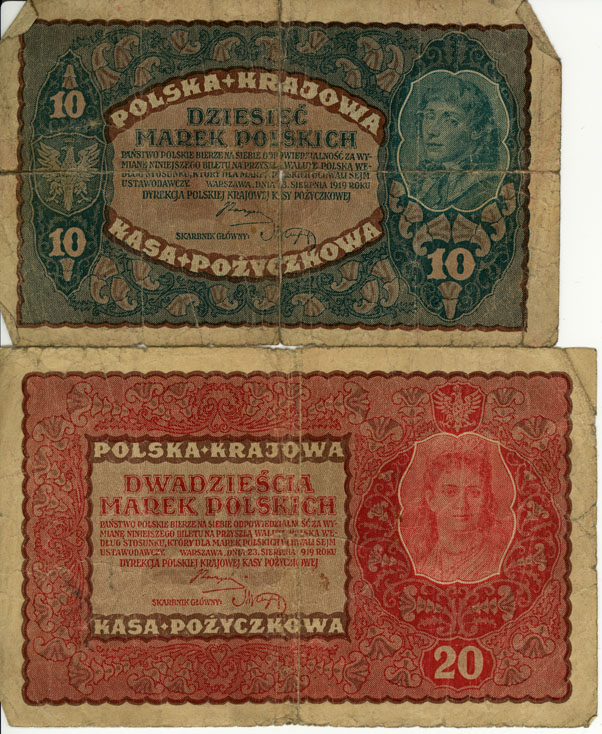
Mp 10 and Mp 20 from 1919

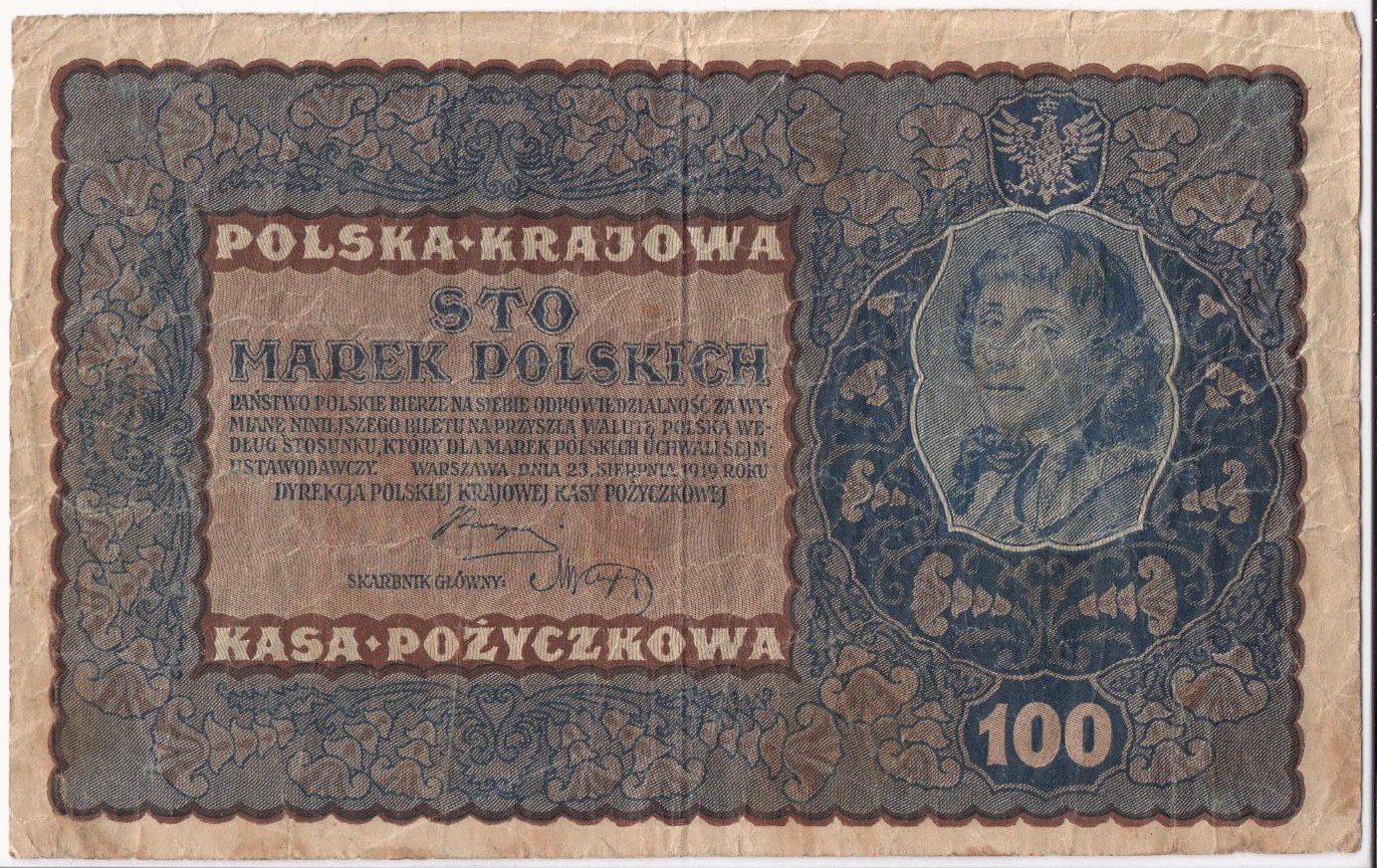
Obverse

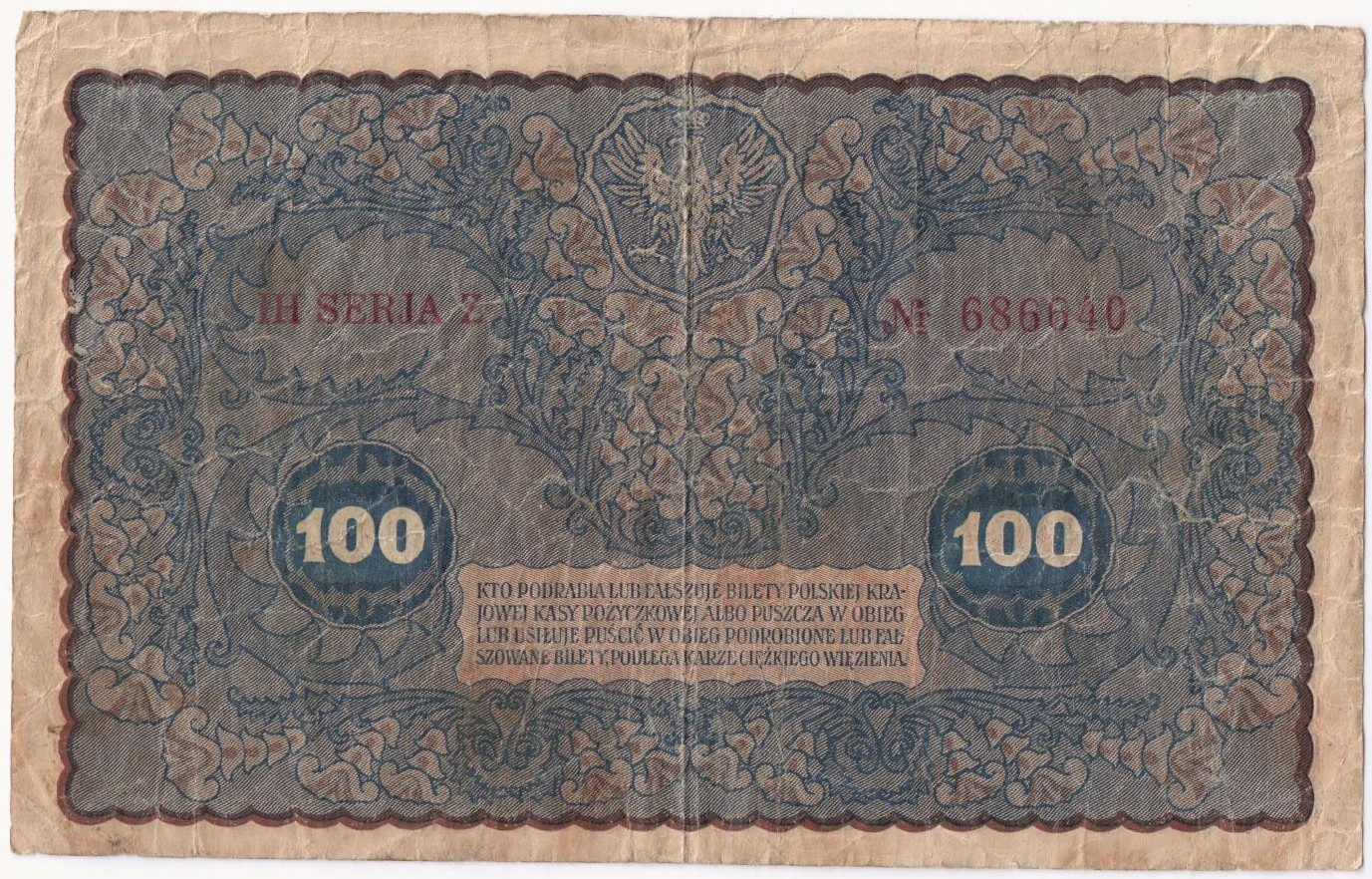
Reverse

Mp 100 note (1919)

The marka (alternatively mark; Polish: marka polska, abbreviated Mp, Polish-language plural declensions: marki, marek) was the temporary currency of the Kingdom of Poland and of the Republic of Poland between 1917 and 1924. It was subdivided into 100 Fenigów (phonetic Polish spelling of German "Pfennig"), like its German original after which it was modelled.

== History ==
During World War I, in 1915, after defeating the Russians, the Central Powers occupied the whole territory of the former Congress Poland and appointed two Governors General: a German (Hans Hartwig von Beseler) in Warsaw and an Austro-Hungarian (Karl Kuk) in Lublin. The civil administration of the country was laid into the hands of imported German (mostly Prussian) and Austrian (mostly Polish) officials. Four currencies circulated: the Russian ruble, the papiermark, the ostrubel and the Austro-Hungarian krone. On December 9 the following year, after consultations with the Austrians, the chief of the German Administration, Wolfgang von Kries proclaimed the foundation of a new bank, called the Polish Loan Bank (Polska Krajowa Kasa Pożyczkowa) and the creation of a new currency unit, the Polish marka, equivalent to the German mark. The stability of the new currency was guaranteed by the German Reichsbank up to the amount of 1 billion marks.

In 1917 new coins (1f, 5f, 10f and 20f) and banknotes (Mp 1/2, Mp 1, Mp 2, Mp 5, Mp 10, Mp 20, Mp 50, Mp 100, Mp 500 and Mp 1,000) were introduced and started to replace all the previously used currencies. All the banknotes were white with the White Eagle of Poland on a red field. At the time of the Armistice of November 11, 1918, 880 million marks were already in circulation. The new Polish government decided to retain the marka as the national currency and to allow the Loan Bank to continue operating. The following year the German-made banknotes were replaced in circulation with new locally printed ones. These featured Polish historical motifs. The notes of Mp 1, Mp 20 and Mp 500 depicted Queen Jadwiga, the notes of Mp 5, Mp 10, Mp 100 and Mp 1,000 depicted Tadeusz Kościuszko. A silver coin of Mp 50 was planned but never issued due to the galloping inflation.

Poland, already devastated after 123 years of partitions, and by 5 years of war, now entered a series of armed struggles, which crippled the economy even more. In 1920, during the Polish-Bolshevik War, new banknotes of Mp 1/2 with Kosciuszko and Mp 5,000 with both the Queen and Kosciuszko came into use. There were now 5 billion marks in circulation. However, the following years the crisis deepened and by 1922 a period of truly ruinous inflation began. By then there were 207 billion marks in circulation. It was necessary to print notes of Mp 10,000 and Mp 50,000. At the beginning of the following year the inflation gained even more momentum and speed, and notes of Mp 100,000, Mp 250,000, Mp 500,000 and Mp 1,000,000 were introduced, only to be followed by notes of Mp 5,000,000 and Mp 10,000,000 later that year.

Early in 1924, financial reforms devised by politician and economist Władysław Grabski were instituted. The Bank Polski was proclaimed as the new central bank of Poland. The marka was exchanged for a new, gold-based currency, the złoty, at the rate of Mp 1,800,000 to 1 zł. One US dollar was then worth 5.18 zł—or Mp 9,324,000.

== Exchange rates ==
Exchange rate of one U.S. dollar in silver in paper Polish marks:

- 1919 – Mp 90
- 1921 – Mp 6,000
- May 1923 – Mp 52,000
- July 1923 – Mp 140,000
- Beginning of November 1923 – Mp 2,000,000
- End of November 1923 – Mp 5,000,000
- January 1924 – Mp 9,300,000
