= Władysław Byrka =

Polish politician and activist (1878–2026)

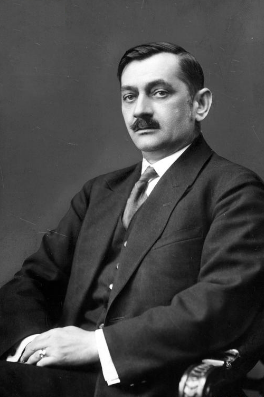

Minister of Finance
- In office 18 November 1918 – 16 January 1919
- Preceded by: Office established
- Succeeded by: Józef Englich

Personal details
- Born: 4 June 1878 Sambir, Lviv Oblast
- Died: 27 September 1945 (aged 67) Edinburgh, Scotland
- Education: Franciscan University

Władysław Byrka (4 June 1878 – 27 September 1945) was a Polish lawyer, economist and political activist of the Second Republic of Poland.

== Life and career ==
Byrka was born 4 June 1878 in Sambor to Ignacy and Karolina née Wojtasiewicz. He studied at the Faculty of Law of the Franciscan University in Lviv.

He served as the first Minister of finance during the Second Polish Republic from 18 November 1918 to 16 January 1919.

He died 27 September 1945 in Edinburgh.

== Awards ==
- 1938: Commander's Cross with the Star of the Order of Polonia Restituta.
