= Bank of Issue in Poland =

Former bank in Nazi-occupied Poland

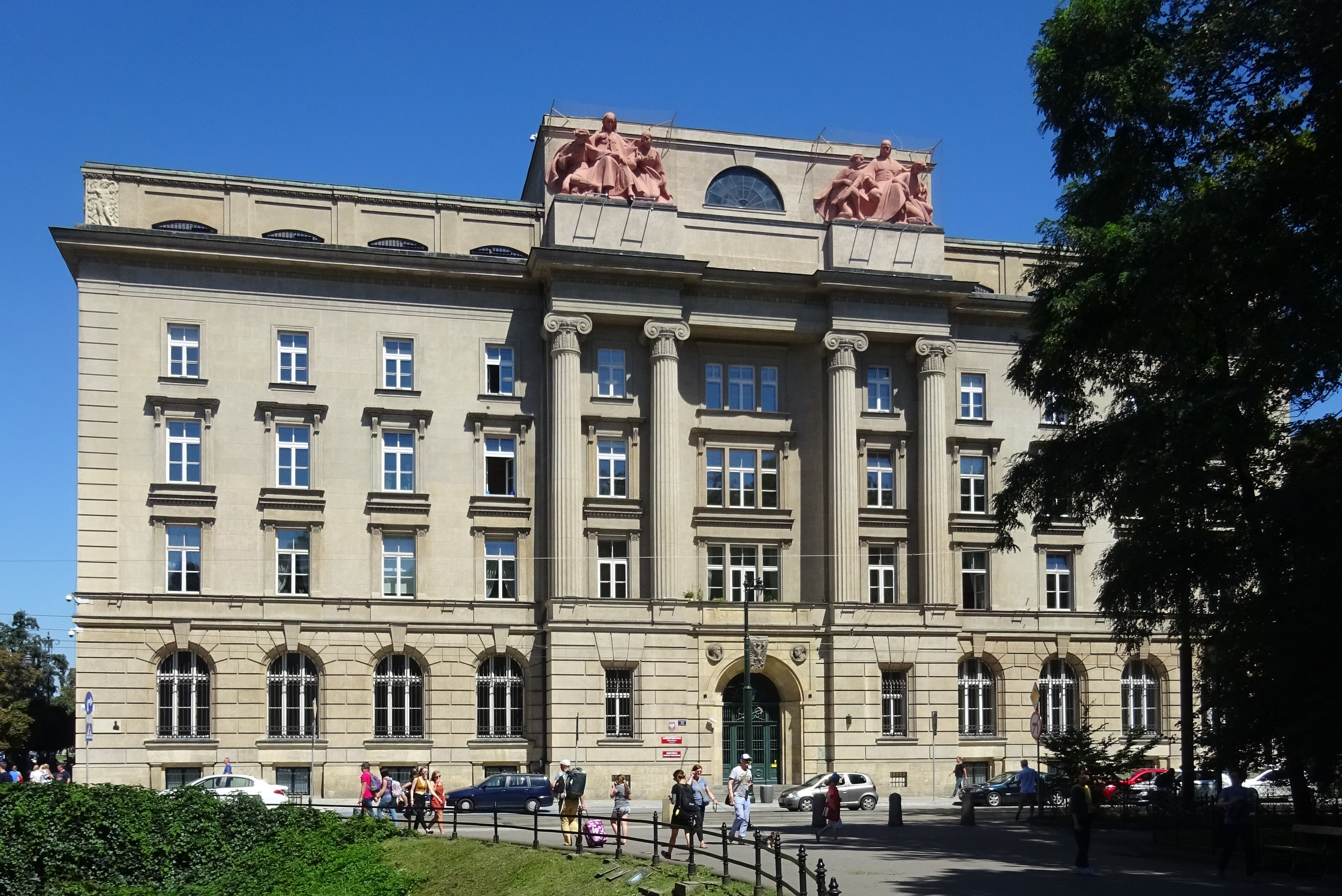
The former seat of the Bank of Issue in Kraków

The Bank of Issue in Poland (German: Emissionsbank in Polen, Polish: Bank Emisyjny w Polsce), also variously translated into English as the Bank of Issue, Issue Bank, Issuing Bank or Emitting Bank in Poland, was a bank of issue created in 1940 by Nazi Germany in the General Government within occupied Poland.

== Creation ==
After the German invasion of Poland, the Reichsbank decided not to introduce German currency there, as it did not want to increase the money supply. Instead, it introduced a system of Reichskreditkassen (credit offices of the German Reich), which issued temporary bonds. This system, intended to be temporary from the beginning, was to be replaced by a new German-controlled currency and central banks in occupied territories. In the meantime, various Polish banks and credit institutions were temporarily closed, while some of their assets were nationalized by the German government. Many people lost their savings. In particular, institutions with Jewish ownership were targeted, as well as Jewish customers. At the same time, German banks began opening their offices in the newly available territories. The plans for a complete takeover of the Polish financial system by the Germans were not finished before the end of the war.

On 15 December 1940 Hans Frank, the governor of the General Government, passed a decree creating the Bank Emisyjny, which began operating in April. Bank Emisyjny was located in Kraków. It was the only institution in occupied Poland with the word Poland in its title.

It was headed by Polish economist, Feliks Młynarski. His German supervisor, and representative of the Reichsbank, was Fritz Paersch.

== Operations ==
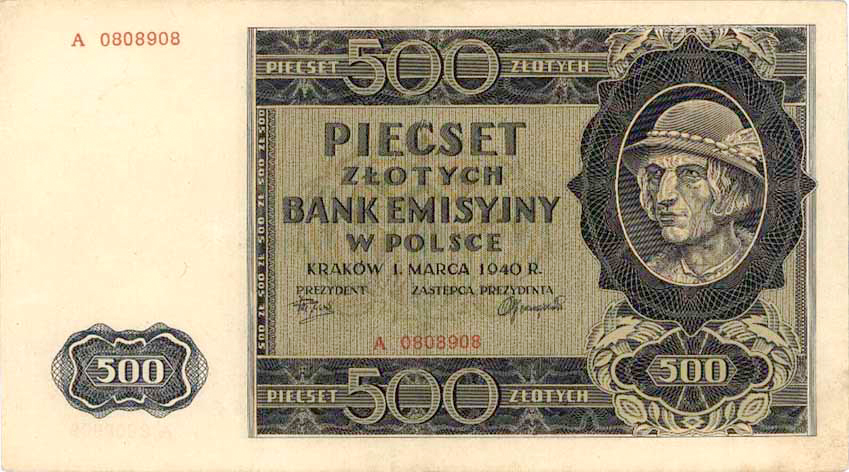
The 500 złoty note, so-called "Góral".

Bank Emisyjny de facto replaced the independent central bank of Poland, the Bank Polski SA, which managed to evacuate most of its assets, including gold, and part of the mint, before the invasion. Officially, however, the Bank Polski still existed, as the Germans unsuccessfully tried to use it on the international scene to regain the assets evacuated and under the control of the Polish government in exile.

The bank's main functions were: issuing currency, discounting promissory notes and cheques, issuing short-term loans, and taking deposits.

The official exchange rate was set as 2 złoty = 1 reichsmark. This system, favoring the German currency, by artificially undervaluing the Reichsmark, was one of the ways of boosting the German economy by pillaging that of the conquered country. A black market exchange rate varied between three and four złotys to a reichsmark.

From 1940 until 1945 it helped finance the German economy. The Bank, as well as other financial institutions in occupied Poland, were tasked with gathering as much capital as possible, to be invested in the German economy. Approximately 11 billion złotys (5.5 billion reichsmarks) were transferred to the German army. It printed new currency (unofficially named after the Bank headquarters "złoty krakowski" - Złoty of Kraków - or after director Młynarski "the młynarki") with no backing which resulted in increasing inflation (market prices rose by three to six times and the exchange rate with the American dollar doubled over the war period).

In January 1945, the remaining assets and German personnel of the Bank were evacuated into Germany proper. It was officially liquidated by the Polish communist government in 1950.

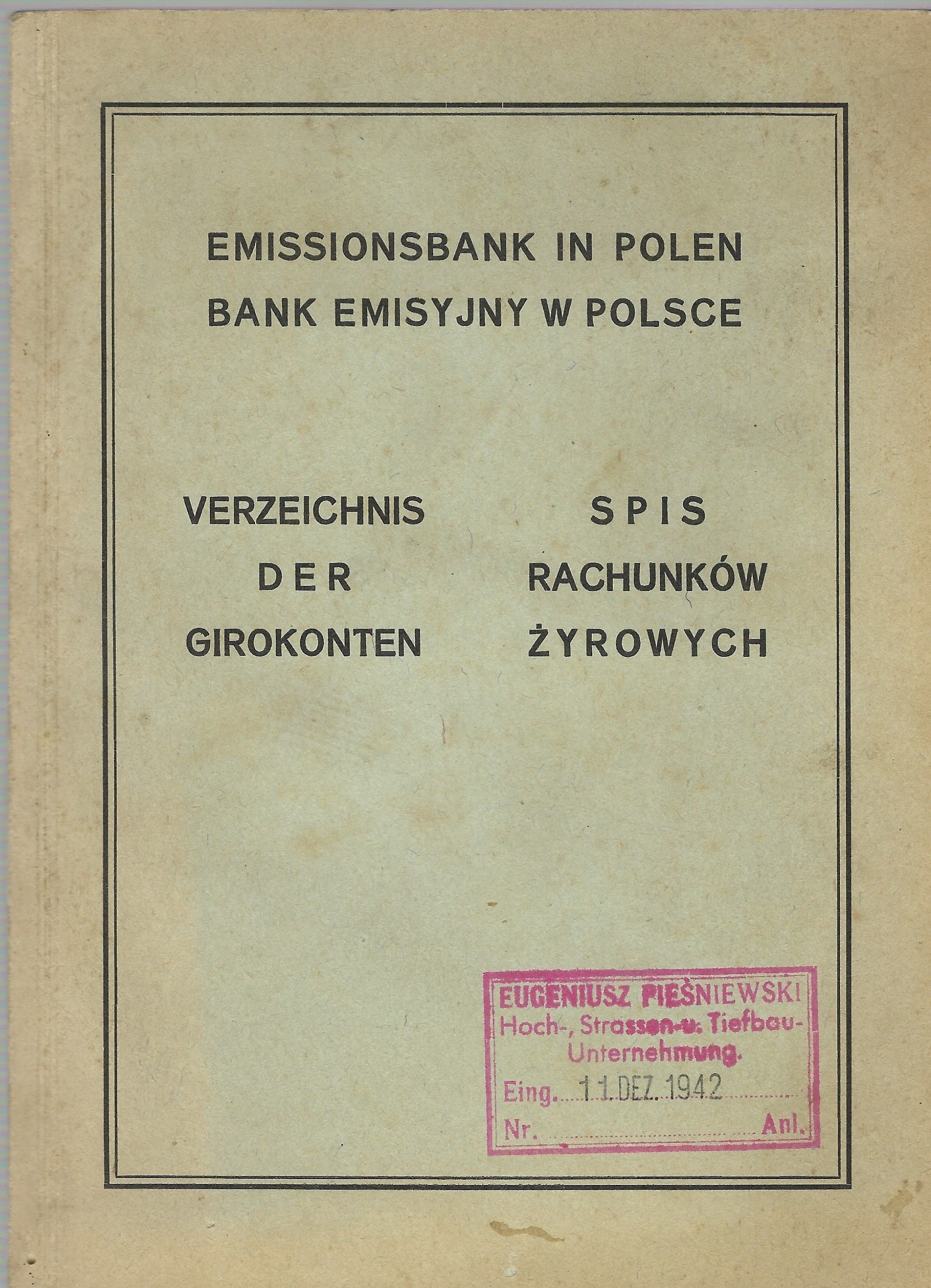
1942 business directory issued by the Emissionsbank in Polen.

== Resistance connections ==
Młynarski was in fact connected to the Polish Underground State which allowed widespread falsification of the new currency by the Polish underground. His very nomination to the post of the director was made in consultation with and approved by the Polish government in exile. The mint's printing presses were also used for falsification of other documents.

== See also ==
- List of central banks
- List of banks in Germany
- List of banks in Poland
