= German ostrubel =

Currency in WWI German-occupied countries

Ostrubel (German, Polish) ostrublis (Latvian, Lithuanian) острубль (Russian)
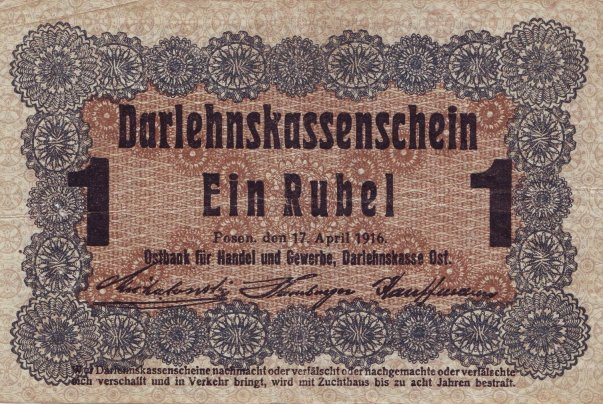
- 1 Ostrubel, 1916
- Plural: The language(s) of this currency belong(s) to the Slavic languages. There is more than one way to construct plural forms.

Denominations
- Subunit
- 1/100: copeck (копѣйка)
- Banknotes: 20, 50 copecks, 1, 3, 10, 25, 100 rubels
- Coins: 1, 2, 3 copecks

Demographics
- Date of introduction: 17 April 1916
- Official user(s): (German Empire) Ober Ost; Duchy of Courland; United Baltic Duchy
- Unofficial users: Poland (1918–20); Lithuania (1918–22); Estonia (1918–19)

Issuance
- Central bank: Ostbank für Handel und Gewerbe
- This infobox shows the latest status before this currency was rendered obsolete. Circulated alongside German Ostmark, with 2 Ostmark = 1 Ostrubel

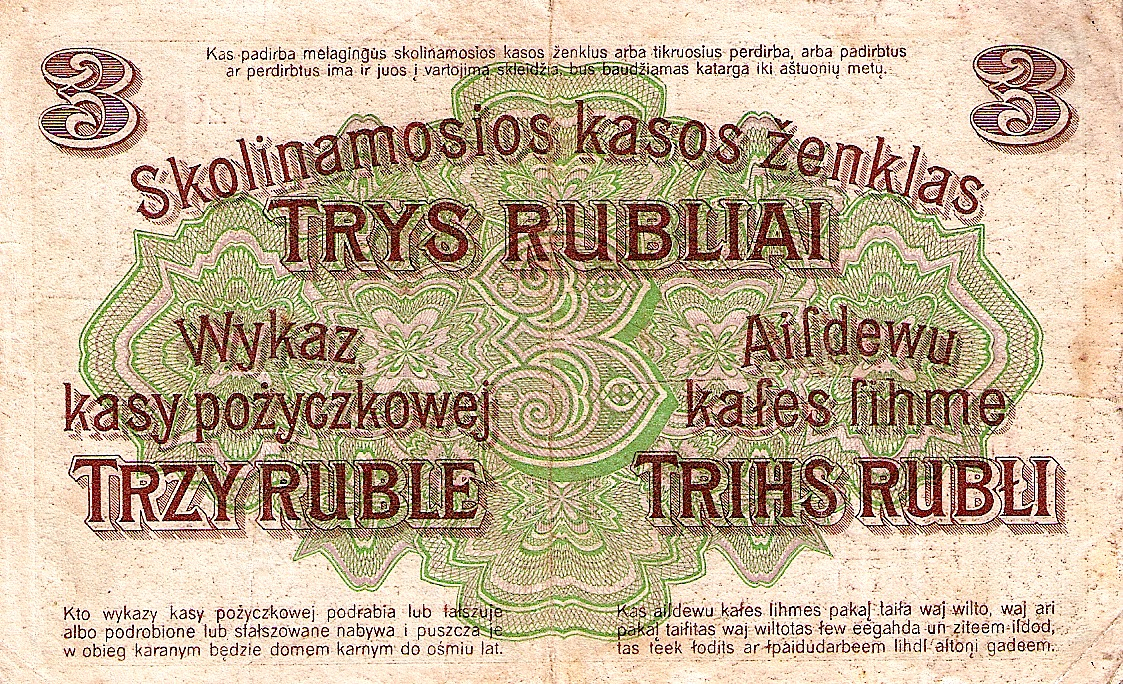
Reverse side of a 3 Ostrubel banknote, 1916

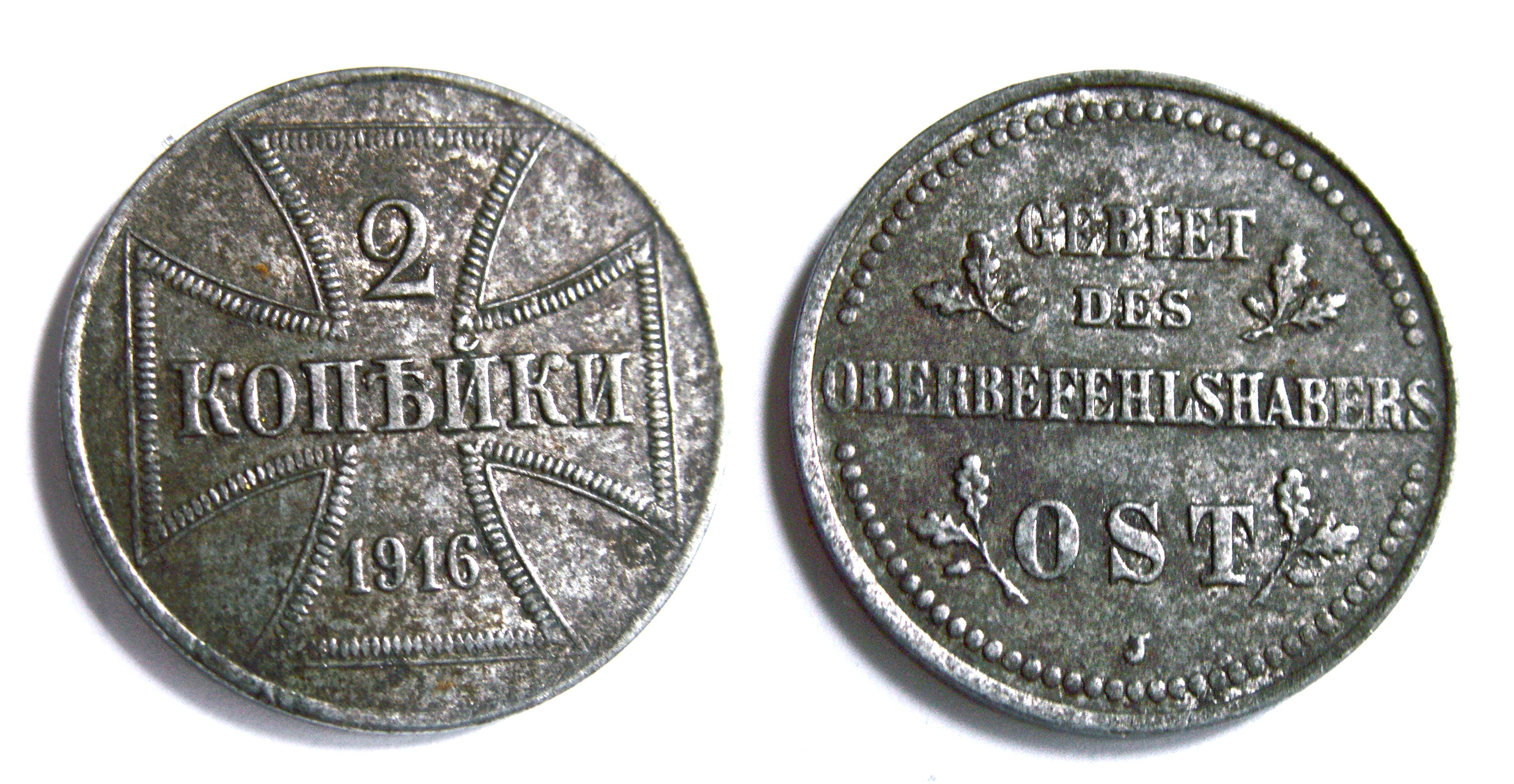
A 1916 Ober Ost 2-copeck coin, reading 2 Копѣйки 1916 / Gebiet des Oberbefehlshabers Ost

Ostrubel (German and Polish: Ostrubel; Latvian and Lithuanian: Ostrublis; Russian: Острубль) is the name given to a currency denominated in copecks and rubels, which was issued by Germany in 1916 for use in the eastern areas under German occupation (Ober Ost and the Government General of Warsaw). It was initially equal to the Imperial rouble. The reason for the issue was a shortage of currency. The banknotes were produced by the Darlehnskasse, a unit of the Ostbank für Handel und Gewerbe in Posen (now Poznań) on 17 April 1916.

From 4 April 1916, the Ostrubel circulated alongside the Ostmark in the Ober Ost area, with 2 Ostmark = 1 Ostrubel. In the Government General of Warsaw the Ostruble was replaced by the Polish marka on 14 April 1917.

== Denominations ==
The banknote denominations available were:

- 20 copecks;
- 50 copecks;
- 1 rubel;
- 3 rubels;
- 10 rubels;
- 25 rubels;
- 100 rubels.

The front sides of the banknotes carry a warning in German against forging banknotes. On the reverse sides is the same warning in Latvian (with old style orthography), Lithuanian and Polish.

There were also 1 copeck, 2 copeck and 3 copeck coins, made out of iron.

== Aftermath ==
The Ostrubel circulated in Lithuania together with the Ostmark until 1 October 1922, when it was replaced by the litas.

It was also still in use in a part of the Second Polish Republic during the first months of independence, until 29 April 1920.

== Bibliography ==
- Gerhard Hahne, Die Inflation der Markwährungen und das postalische Geschehen im litauisch-polnischen Raum, Forschungsgemeinschaft Litauen im Bund Deutscher Philatelisten e.V., Uetze, (1996) (in German)
- N. Jakimovs and V. Marcilger, The Postal and Monetary History of Latvia 1918–1945, own book, 1991, pp. 14-13–14-15.
