= Lithuanian litas =

Former currency of Lithuania

Lietuvos litas (Lithuanian)
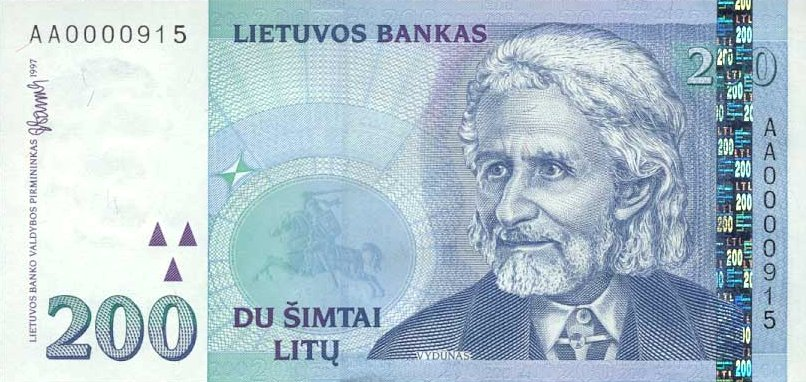
- 200 LTL banknote

ISO 4217
- Code: LTL

Units of account
- Plural: litai (nom. pl.) or litų (gen. pl.) or litu (nom. dl. in pre-war period)
- Symbol: Lt (litas), ct (centas)
- Subunit
- 1/100: centas
- Plural
- centas: centai (nom. pl.) or centų (gen. pl.) or centu (nom. dl. in pre-war period)

Denominations
- Banknotes
- Freq. used: 10, 20, 50, 100, 200 litų
- Rarely used: 1, 2, 5, 500 litų
- Coins
- Freq. used: 1 centas, 2, 5, 10, 20, 50 centų (centai), 1 litas, 2, 5 litai

Demographics
- Date of introduction: 25 June 1993
- Replaced: Lithuanian talonas
- Date of withdrawal: 1 January 2015
- User(s): None, previously: Lithuania

Issuance
- Central bank: Bank of Lithuania
- Website: lb.lt

Valuation
- Inflation: 1.4%
- Source: European Central Bank, April 2013
- Method: HICP

EU Exchange Rate Mechanism (ERM)
- Since: 28 June 2004
- Fixed rate since: 2 February 2002
- Replaced by euro, non cash: 1 January 2015
- Replaced by euro, cash: 16 January 2015
- 1 € =: 3.45280 Lt (permanent)
- Band: pegged in practice, 15% de jure
- This infobox shows the latest status before this currency was rendered obsolete.

The Lithuanian litas (ISO 4217 code: LTL, symbolized as Lt; plural litai (nominative) or litų (genitive) was the currency of Lithuania until 1 January 2015, when it was replaced by the euro. It was divided into 100 centų (genitive case; singular centas, nominative plural centai). The litas was first introduced on 2 October 1922 after World War I, soon after Lithuania declared independence, and was reintroduced on 25 June 1993 following a period of currency exchange from the Soviet ruble to the litas with the temporary talonas then in place. The name was modeled after the name of the country (similar to the lats of Latvia). From 1994 to 2002, the litas was pegged to the U.S. dollar at the rate of 4 to 1. Since 2002, the litas was pegged to the euro at the rate of 3.4528 to 1. The euro was expected to replace the litas by 1 January 2007, but persistent high inflation and the economic crisis of 2007-2008 delayed the switch.

On 1 January 2015, the euro replaced the litas at a rate of LTL 3.4528 to € 1. Nevertheless, coins and banknotes of the second litas will be exchanged indefinitely into euros by the Bank of Lithuania.

== First litas, 1922–1941 ==
=== History ===
The first litas was introduced on 2 October 1922, replacing the ostmark and ostrubel, both of which had been issued by the occupying German forces during World War I. The ostmark was known as the auksinas in Lithuania.

The litas was established at a value of 10 litas = 1 US dollar and was subdivided into 100 centai. In the face of worldwide economic depression, the litas appeared to be quite a strong and stable currency, reflecting the negligible influence of the depression on the Lithuanian economy. One litas was covered by 0.150462 grams of gold stored by the Bank of Lithuania in foreign countries. In March 1923, the circulation amounted to 39,412,984 litas, of which 15,738,964 backed by actual gold and 24,000,000 by high exchange securities. It was required that at least one third of the total circulation would be covered by gold and the rest by other assets. By 1938, 1 U.S. dollar was worth about 5.9 litai, rising to about 20 U.S. cents before its disappearance in 1941.

==== Memelgebiet ====
In March 1939, Nazi Germany demanded that Lithuania give up the Klaipėda Region (also known as the Memel Territory), which had been detached from Germany after World War I. The Lithuanian government complied, and on 23 March 1939 the area was annexed by Germany.

On the same day, the reichsmark replaced the litas as the official currency of the region, with 1 litas being exchanged for 40 pfennig. Until 20 May 1939, inhabitants of the Memelgebiet could exchange litas for reichsmarks.

==== Soviet occupation ====
The litas was replaced by the Soviet ruble in April 1941 after Lithuania was annexed by the Soviet Union, with 1 litas equal to 0.9 rubles, although the actual value of the litas was about 3 to 5 rubles. Such an exchange rate provided great profit for Soviet military and party officials. Trying to protect the value of the currency, people started to massively buy goods, which, together with a downfall in production (following nationalization), caused material shortages. Withdrawals were then limited to 250 litai before the litas was completely abolished. In 1941, the circulation of litas was completely prohibited.

=== Coins ===
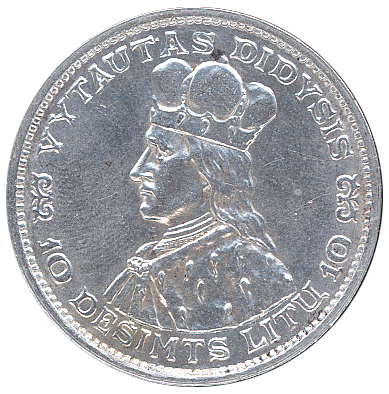
Interwar 10 litų coin, depicting Vytautas the Great

Coins were introduced in 1925 in denominations of 1 centas, 2 centai, 5 centai, 10, 20, 50-centų, and 1 litas, 2, 5-litai, with the litas coins in silver. 10 litas coins were introduced in 1936. All these coins were designed by the sculptor Juozas Zikaras (1881–1944). The litas coins displayed Jonas Basanavičius and Vytautas the Great, which was replaced by a portrait of President Antanas Smetona.

=== Banknotes ===
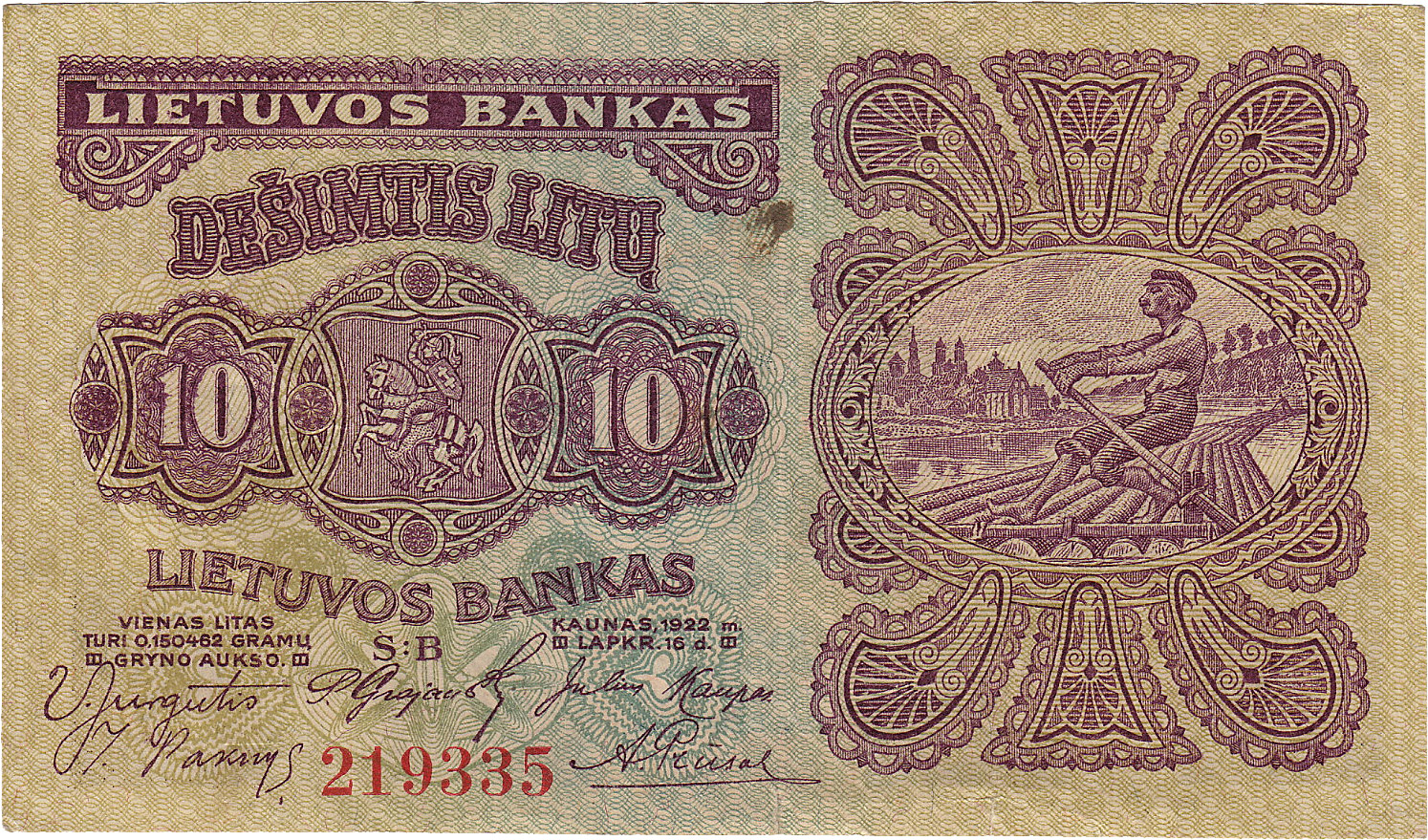
10 litų banknote (1922)

In 1922, the Bank of Lithuania issued notes in denominations of 1 centas, 2 centu, 5 centai, 10, 20, 50-centų, and 1 litas, 2 litu, 5 litai, 10, 50, 100 litų. In 1924, 500 and 1000 litų notes were added. Denominations below 5 litai were replaced by coins in 1925.

10 September 1922 Issue
Image	Denomination	Obverse	Reverse
	1 centas		Coat of arms of Lithuania
	5 centai		Coat of arms of Lithuania
	20-centų		Coat of arms of Lithuania
	50-centų		Coat of arms of Lithuania
	1 litas		Coat of arms of Lithuania
	5 litai		Coat of arms of Lithuania

16 November 1922 Issue
Image	Denomination	Obverse	Reverse
	1 centas		
	2 centu		
	5 centai		
	10-centų		
	20-centų	Coat of arms of Lithuania	
	50-centų	Coat of arms of Lithuania	
	1 litas	Coat of arms of Lithuania	
	2 litu	Coat of arms of Lithuania	
	5 litai	Portrait of a woman at the spinning wheel	Sower
	10 litų	Coat of arms of Lithuania, Timber rafting	Two women
	50 litų	Arms of Kaunas, Vilnius and Klaipėda, Grand Duke Gediminas	Vilnius Cathedral and its belfry
	100 litų	Coat of arms of Lithuania, Vytautas the Great	Two women

1924–1928 Issue
Image	Denomination	Obverse	Reverse
	10 litų	Coat of arms of Lithuania	Fieldwork
	50 litų	Dr. Jonas Basanavičius	Vilnius Cathedral
	100 litų	Lithuanian woman in traditional dress	Bank of Lithuania
	500 litų	Coat of arms of Lithuania	
	1000 litų	Coat of arms of Lithuania	

1929–1930 "500 Years Vytautas the Great" Commemorative Issues
Image	Denomination	Obverse	Reverse
	5 litai	Coat of arms of Lithuania, Vytautas the Great	Battle of Grunwald
	20 litų	Coat of arms of Lithuania, Vytautas the Great, Vytautas' the Great Church	Statue of Liberty, Klaipėda

1938 "20 Years of Independence" Commemorative Issue
Image	Denomination	Obverse	Reverse
	10 litų	Antanas Smetona 1st President of Lithuania	The original 20 members of the Council of Lithuania after signing the Act of Independence of Lithuania or Act of 16 February 1918

== Second litas, 1993–2015 ==
The litas became Lithuania's currency once more on 25 June 1993, when it replaced the temporary talonas currency at a rate of 1 litas to 100 talonas.

=== Banknotes ===
In 1993, banknotes (dated 1991) were issued in denominations of 1 litas, 2, 5 litai, 10, 20, 50, 100 litų. Due to poor designs, these were found to be easily copied and a second series of notes was swiftly introduced in denominations of 1 litas, 2, 5 litai, 10, 20, 50 litų, with only the 100 litų notes of the first series remaining in circulation. 200 litų notes were introduced in 1997, followed by 500 litų in 2000.

Denomination	Equivalent in euros	Year of Introduction	Image	Banknote designer	Banknote features	Printing house	Demonetised
1 Litas	€0.29	1994		Giedrius Jonaitis	Obverse: Žemaitė; Reverse: Church of Saint Juozapas in Palūšė	De La Rue Ltd., United Kingdom	2007 March 1
2 Litai	€0.58	1993		Giedrius Jonaitis	Obverse: Motiejus Valančius; Reverse: Trakai Island Castle	De La Rue Ltd., United Kingdom	2007 March 1
5 Litai	€1.45	1993		Giedrius Jonaitis	Obverse: Jonas Jablonskis; Reverse: Sculpture "School of hardship" by P. Rimšas	De La Rue Ltd., United Kingdom	2007 March 1
10 Litų	€2.90	1991		Giedrius Jonaitis	Obverse: Steponas Darius & Stasys Girėnas; Reverse: Lėktuvas Lituanica	American Banknote Corporation, USA	1996 January 1
10 Litų	€2.90	1993		Giedrius Jonaitis	Obverse: Steponas Darius & Stasys Girėnas; Reverse: Lėktuvas Lituanica	American Banknote Corporation, USA	2007 March 1
10 Litų	€2.90	1997		Giedrius Jonaitis	Obverse: Steponas Darius & Stasys Girėnas; Reverse: Lėktuvas Lituanica	De La Rue Ltd., United Kingdom	2012 June 1
10 Litų	€2.90	2001		Giedrius Jonaitis	Obverse: Steponas Darius & Stasys Girėnas; Reverse: Lėktuvas Lituanica	Orell Fussli Security Printing Ltd., Switzerland	2015 January 16
10 Litų	€2.90	2007		Giedrius Jonaitis	Obverse: Steponas Darius & Stasys Girėnas; Reverse: Lėktuvas Lituanica	Giesecke & Devrient GmbH, Germany	2015 January 16
20 Litų	€5.79	1991		Justas Tolvaišis	Obverse: Maironis; Reverse: Sculpture "Freedom" by J. Zikaras	American Banknote Corporation, USA	1994 June 1
20 Litų	€5.79	1993		Justas Tolvaišis	Obverse: Maironis; Reverse: Sculpture "Freedom" by J. Zikaras	American Banknote Corporation, USA	2007 March 1
20 Litų	€5.79	1997		Justas Tolvaišis & Giedrius Jonaitis	Obverse: Maironis; Reverse: Sculpture "Freedom" by J. Zikaras	De La Rue Ltd., United Kingdom	2012 June 1
20 Litų	€5.79	2001		Giedrius Jonaitis	Obverse: Maironis; Reverse: Sculpture "Freedom" by J. Zikaras	Giesecke & Devrient GmbH, Germany	2015 January 16
50 Litų	€14.48	1991		Rimvydas Bartkus	Obverse: Jonas Basanavičius; Reverse: Vilnius Cathedral	American Banknote Corporation, USA	1996 January 1
50 Litų	€14.48	1993		Rimvydas Bartkus	Obverse: Jonas Basanavičius; Reverse: Vilnius Cathedral	American Banknote Corporation, USA	2007 March 1
50 Litų	€14.48	1998		Giedrius Jonaitis & Rimvydas Bartkus	Obverse: Jonas Basanavičius; Reverse: Vilnius Cathedral	Giesecke & Devrient GmbH, Germany	2015 January 16
50 Litų	€14.48	2003		Giedrius Jonaitis	Obverse: Jonas Basanavičius; Reverse: Vilnius Cathedral	Giesecke & Devrient GmbH, Germany	2015 January 16
100 Litų	€28.96	1991		Rytis Valantinas	Obverse: Simonas Daukantas; Reverse: Vilnius University	Orell Fussli Security Printing Ltd., Switzerland	2001 July 1
100 Litų	€28.96	2000		Giedrius Jonaitis	Obverse: Simonas Daukantas; Reverse: Vilnius University	Orell Fussli Security Printing Ltd., Switzerland	2015 January 16
100 Litų	€28.96	2007		Rytis Valantinas	Obverse: Simonas Daukantas; Reverse: Vilnius University	Francois – Charles Oberthur Fiduciaire, France	2015 January 16
200 Litų	€57.92	1997		Rytis Valantinas	Obverse: Vydūnas; Reverse: Klaipėda Lighthouse	Giesecke & Devrient GmbH, Germany	2015 January 16
500 Litų	€144.81	2000		Rimvydas Bartkus	Obverse: Vincas Kudirka; Reverse: Lithuanian landscape	Giesecke & Devrient GmbH, Germany	2015 January 16

=== Coins ===
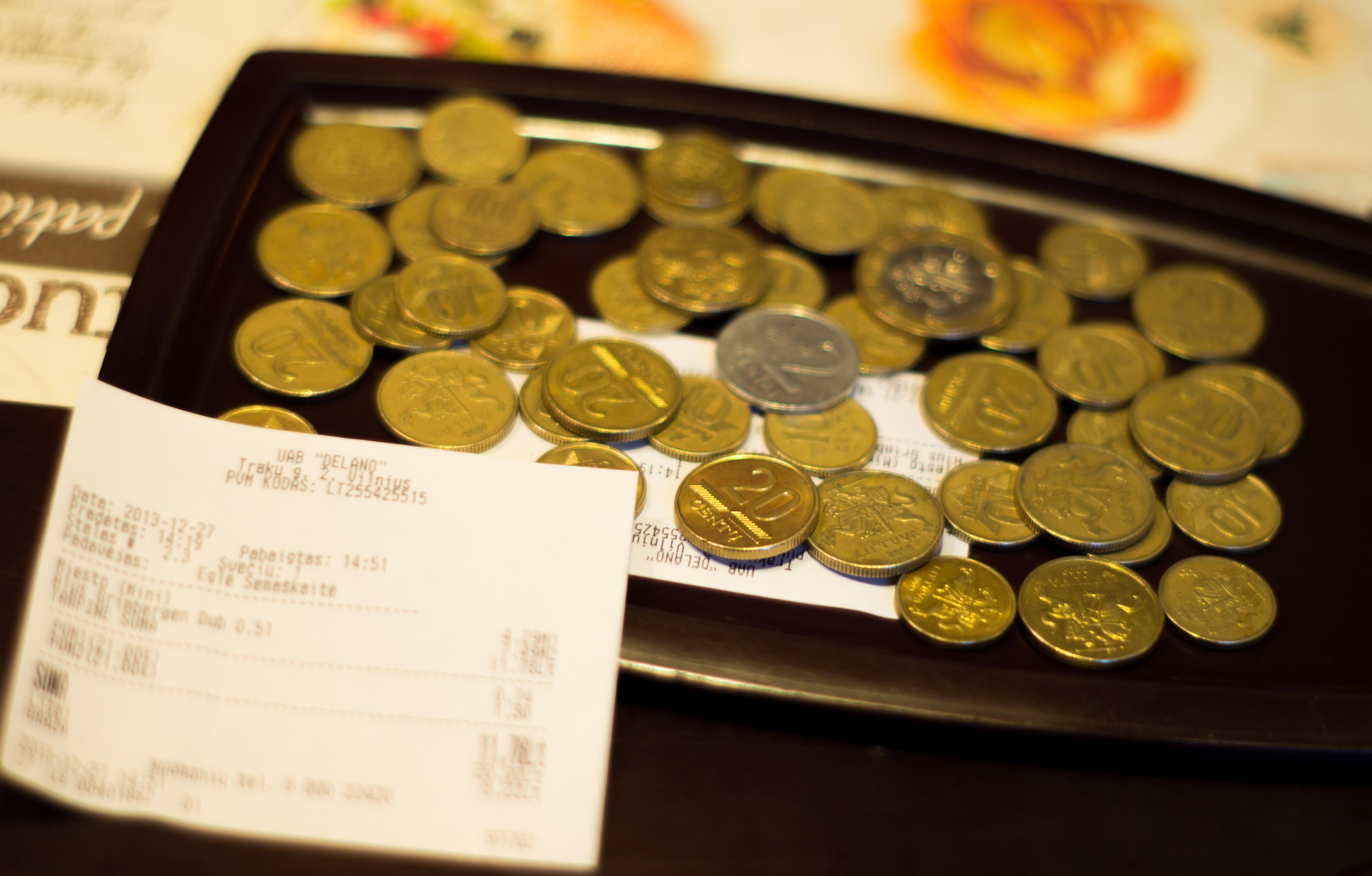
Lithuanian litas coins

In 1993, coins were introduced (dated 1991) in denominations of 1 centas, 2, 5 centai, 10, 20, 50-centų, and 1 litas, 2, 5 litai. The 1 centas, 2, 5 centai pieces were minted in aluminium, the 10, 20, 50-centų in bronze and the litas coins were of cupro-nickel. In 1997, nickel-brass 10, 20, 50-centų coins were introduced, followed by cupro-nickel 1 litas, bimetallic 2 and 5 litai in 1998. All had the obverse designs showing the coat of arms in the center and the name of the state "Lietuva" in capital letters.

The first coins were minted in the United Kingdom and arrived in Lithuania on 31 October 1990. Later, all coins were minted in the state run "Lithuanian Mint", which started its operations in September 1992 and helped to cut the costs of introducing the litas.

=== History ===
==== Preparatory work ====
Officials started to prepare for the introduction of the litas even before independence was declared, it was thought to introduce the litas alongside the ruble even if Lithuania remained a part of the Soviet Union. In December 1989, artists were asked to submit sketches of possible coin and banknote designs. Also, a list of famous people was compiled in order to determine who should be featured for its currency.

The Bank of Lithuania was established on 1 March 1990. Ten days later, Lithuania declared its independence from the Soviet Union. At first, the Lithuanian government negotiated in vain with François Charles Oberthur, a printing company located in France to print the banknotes. In November 1990, the Bank of Lithuania decided to work with the United States Banknote Corporation (now American Banknote Corporation). In late autumn 1991, the first shipments of litas banknotes and coins arrived in Lithuania.

In November 1991, the Currency Issue Law was passed and the Litas Committee was created. It had the power to fix the date for the litas to come into circulation, the terms for the withdrawal from circulation of the ruble, the exchange rate of the litas and other conditions. Officials waited for a while for the economy to stabilise so as not to expose the young litas to inflation. About 80% of Lithuania's trade was with Russia and the government needed to find a way to smooth the transition away from the ruble zone. Also Lithuania needed to gather funds to form a stabilisation fund.

==== Gathering funds ====
At first, Lithuania did not have gold or any other securities to back up the litas. Lithuania needed to find about 200 million U.S. dollars to form the stabilisation fund. First, it sought to recover its pre-war gold reserves (about 10 tonnes) from France, the United Kingdom, Switzerland, etc. In the interwar period Lithuania stored its gold reserves in foreign banks. After the occupation in 1940 those reserves were deemed "nobody's": there was no independent Lithuanian state and most Western countries condemned the occupation as illegal and did not recognise the Soviet Union as a successor. The Bank of England, for example, sold the reserves to the Soviets in 1967. However, in January 1992, it announced that this action was a "betrayal of the people of the Baltic states" and that it would return the originally deposited amount of gold, now worth about 90 million pounds sterling, to the three Baltic states. Lithuania received 18.5 million pounds or 95,000 ounces of gold and remained a customer of the bank. Similarly, in March 1992 Lithuania reclaimed gold from the Bank of France and later from the Bank of Sweden.

In October 1992, the International Monetary Fund (Lithuania joined this organisation on 29 April 1992) granted the first loan of 23.05 million U.S. dollars to create the stabilisation fund. However, it is estimated that at the time of the introduction of the new currency, Lithuania gathered only $120 million for the stabilisation fund. For a brief while it was kept a secret so as not to further damage the reputation and trust in the litas.

==== Delayed introduction of the litas ====
Lietuvos Rytas journalists investigated the production of the litas and found that for a while it was purposely held back. For example, 6 million litas designated to pay for printing the banknotes stayed in a zero interest bearing account for a year in a bank in Sweden. By 1992, the litas was ready for introduction, but the banknotes were of extremely low quality, they could easily be counterfeited with a simple colour printer; especially the 10, 20, and 50 litų banknotes.

Newly elected President Algirdas Brazauskas dismissed the Chairman of the Bank of Lithuania, Vilius Baldišis, for incompetence just two months before the introduction of the litas. Baldišis was later charged for negligence that cost Lithuania $3,000,000. Some claim that the Russian secret services were behind the affair. Baldišis' explanation was that he was trying to cut the costs of printing the banknotes and thus did not order better security features. Also, "U.S. Banknote Corporation" was accused of violation of the contract terms.

But when the new issue of litas banknotes was redesigned, reprinted, and introduced in June 1993, it was found that the quality of the money was still too low and the banknotes would have to be redesigned further in the future. All these scandals and the small backup of gold reserve (about $120 million instead of $200 million) damaged the reputation of the litas. The newly appointed chair, Romualdas Visokavičius, moved things quickly and won the trust of the public. However, in October he was asked to resign mostly because of his involvement with a private bank "Litimpex".

==== Introduction of the litas ====
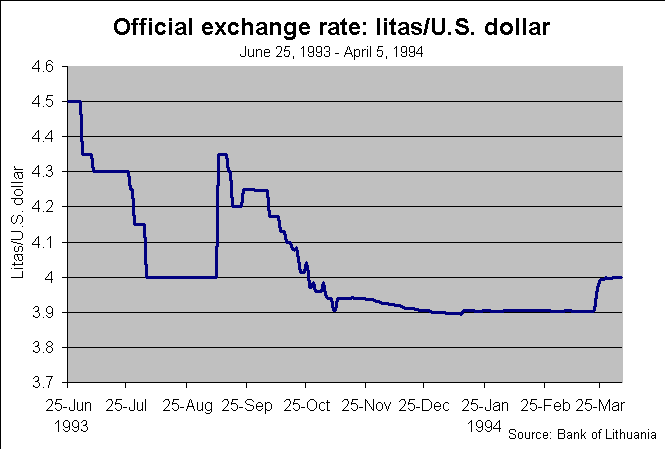
Official litas and U.S. dollar exchange rate June 1993 – March 1994 according to statistics published by the Bank of Lithuania

On 25 June 1993, the litas was finally introduced at the rate of 1 litas to 100 talonas. 1 U.S. dollar was worth 4.5 litai and decreased to about 4.2 a couple of weeks later. Even the introduction of the litas was followed by a scandal. The government allowed the changing of unlimited amounts of talonas to the litas without having to show the source of the talonas. This allowed criminal groups to legalize their funds.

In July, circulation of the talonas was stopped and on 1 August 1993, the litas became the only legal tender. Following the reintroduction of the litas, there was an effort to weed out U.S. dollars from the market. The talonas was never really trusted by the people and the ruble was very unstable. Thus, people started using U.S. dollars as a stable currency. Another alternative was the German mark, but it was not available in larger quantities. A lot of shops printed prices in several different currencies, including dollars, and the economy was very "dollarised" as it was legal to make trades in foreign currencies.

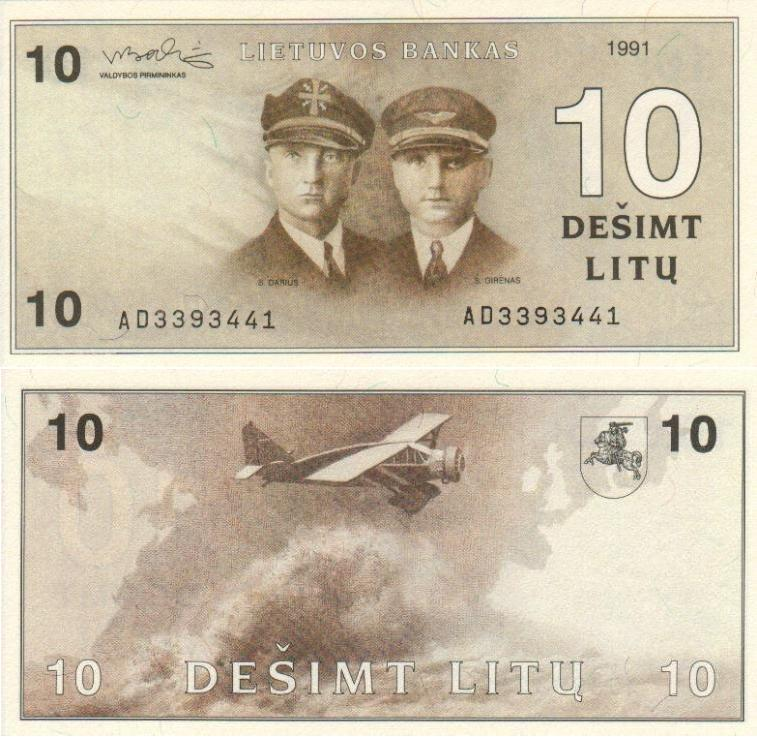
Early litas lacked necessary protection

Due to poor banknote quality (both talonas and early litas) it was easy to counterfeit them. Most shops were forced to acquire ultraviolet lamps to check for forgeries. One group, for example, printed 500 talonas banknotes in Turkey. It is estimated that their notes totaled 140,000 litas.

From 1 April 1994 to 1 February 2002, the litas was pegged to the U.S. dollar at the rate of 4 to 1 (the litas was stable around 3.9 for half a year before the rate was fixed). The main reasons for this fixation was little trust in the emerging monetary system, fear of high fluctuations in currency exchange rates, desire to attract foreign investors, and International Monetary Fund recommendations. The peg was renewable every year. For a while a peg was considered to a basket of currencies: the European Currency Unit. At around this time Lithuania also established a currency board.

==== The litas and the euro ====
After successful round of negotiations in 1998 with the European Commission, the idea of aligning with the future currency of European Union. By 1999, the Bank of Lithuania proposed currency board with both US dollar and the euro.

The pegging of the litas and the euro was proposed to be implemented by the second half of 2001.

On 2 February 2002, the litas was pegged to the euro at a rate of 3.4528 to 1 (1 LTL = 0.28962 EUR) (it was the rate that the litas and the euro had by the time); this rate was not expected to change – and indeed did not – until the litas was completely replaced by the euro on 1 January 2015. After the peg, Lithuania became a member of the Eurozone de facto. The litas became part of the ERM II on 28 June 2004. the EU's exchange rate mechanism. The design of Lithuanian euro coins had already been prepared.

Lithuania postponed its euro day several times, since the country did not meet the convergence criteria. High inflation—which reached 11% in October 2008, well above the then acceptable limit of 4.2%—contributed to Lithuania's failure to meet the criteria. In 2011, polls showed narrow opposition to the currency. On 23 July 2014, the Council of the European Union adopted a decision allowing Lithuania to adopt the euro as its currency on 1 January 2015. Litas and euro were both legal tender in Lithuania until 16 January 2015.

== See also ==
- Lithuanian auksinas
- Lithuanian long currency - currency used in medieval Lithuania
- Adoption of the euro in Lithuania
- Lithuanian euro coins
- Lithuanian grammar: Noun modification by numeral – usage of forms litas, litai, litų
- Economy of Lithuania

== Sources ==
- Alister Doyle (9 March 1992). "Lithuania Is Likely to Peg Currency to Dlr". Reuters.
- Peter Rodgers (23 January 1992). "Baltic states repaid #90m in bullion". The Independent.
- Kurt Schuler; George Selgin & Joseph Sinkey, Jr. (28 October 1991). "Replacing the Ruble in Lithuania: Real Change versus Pseudoreform". Cato Policy Analysis (163). Archived from the original on 11 December 2006.

First litas
Preceded by: German Ostmark and German Ostrubel a.k.a. Lithuanian auksinas Reason: independence (in 1918)	Currency of Lithuania; 1922 – 1941	Succeeded by: Soviet ruble Reason: annexation

Second litas
Preceded by: Lithuanian talonas Reason: replacement of temporary currency Ratio: 1 litas = 100 talonai	Currency of Lithuania; 1993 – 2015	Succeeded by: Euro; Reason: joining the eurozone Ratio: 1 euro = 3.4528 litai
