= Adoption of the euro in Lithuania =

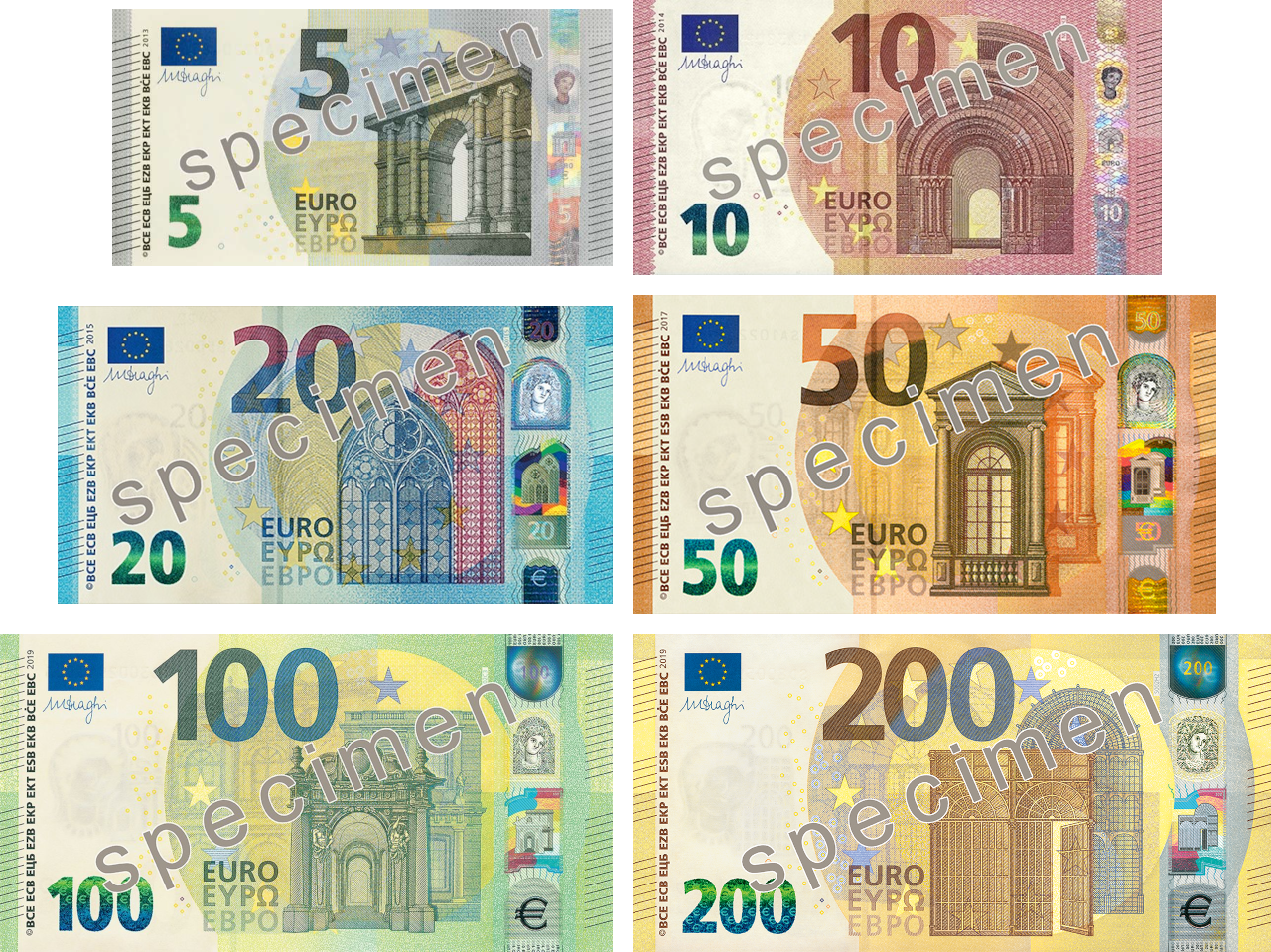
- Euro banknotes - all denominations
- Date: 1 January 2015 (introduction) – 14 January 2015 (complete transition).
- Location: Lithuania
- Type: Economic transition
- Theme: Adoption of the euro as the national currency
- Participants: Government of Lithuania, European Union
- Outcome: Replacement of the Lithuanian litas with the euro

Eurozone participation European Union member states (special territories not shown) 21 in the eurozone 1 in ERM II, with an opt-out (Denmark) 5 not in ERM II, but committed to join the eurozone after meeting the convergence criteria (Czech Republic, Hungary, Poland, Romania, and Sweden) Non–EU member states 4 using the euro with a monetary agreement (Andorra, Monaco, San Marino, and Vatican City) 2 using the euro unilaterally (Kosovo and Montenegro)

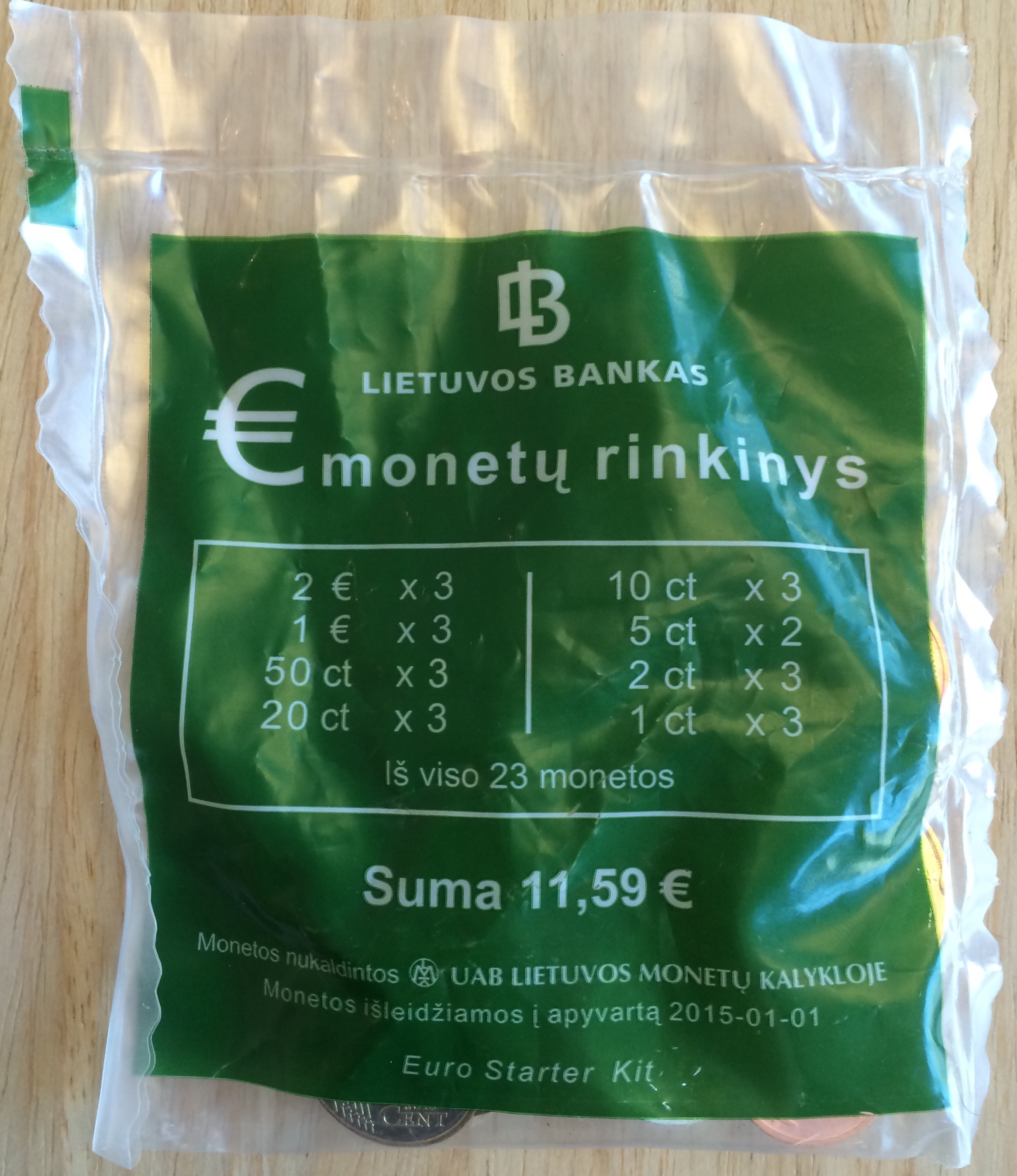
Lithuanian euro starter kit

Lithuania, as an EU member state, joined the eurozone by adopting the euro on 1 January 2015. This made it the last of the three Baltic states to adopt the euro, after Estonia (2011) and Latvia (2014). Before then, its currency, the litas, was pegged to the euro at 3.4528 litas to 1 euro.

== History ==
All members of the European Union, except Denmark, are required by treaty to join the eurozone once certain economic criteria have been met. The Lithuanian litas participated in ERM II since 28 June 2004, and was pegged to the euro at a rate of 3.45280 litai = €1. Lithuania originally set 1 January 2007 as its target date for adopting the euro, and in March 2006 requested that the European Commission and the European Central Bank conduct an assessment on their readiness to adopt the currency. The Commission's report found that while Lithuania met four of the five criteria, their average annual inflation was 2.7%, exceeding the limit of 2.6%. As a result, the Commission concluded that "there should be no change at present to Lithuania's status as a Member State with a derogation." Lithuania is the only country initially denied approval to adopt the euro after requesting a convergence check.

In December 2006, the government approved a new convergence plan, which pushed the expected adoption date to post-2010 due to inflation. In 2007, Prime Minister Gediminas Kirkilas stated that he hoped for adoption around 2010–11. Generally high inflation, which reached a peak of 12.7% in June 2008 (well above the 4.2% limit of the time), delayed Lithuania's adoption of the euro. By the time of the 2010 European debt crisis, the expected switch-over date had been put back further, to 2014. Lithuania expressed interest in a suggestion from the IMF that countries which are not able to meet the Maastricht criteria be able to "partially adopt" the euro, using the currency but not getting a seat at the European Central Bank. Interviews with the Foreign Minister and Prime Minister in May and August 2012 respectively highlighted that Lithuania still aimed to adopt the euro, but would not set a target date until the state of the eurozone post-crisis was clear.

During the 2012 Lithuanian parliamentary election campaign, the Social Democrats were reported to prefer delaying the euro adoption, from the previous 2014 target until 1 January 2015. When the second round of the elections were concluded in October, the Social Democrats, the Labour Party and the Order and Justice won a majority and formed the new government, and the coalition parties were expected to accept the proposed delay in adoption of the euro.

When Prime Minister Algirdas Butkevičius presented his new government in December, eurozone accession as soon as possible was mentioned as one of the key priorities for the government. The Prime Minister said: "January 2015 is a feasible date. But things can also turn out, that we may try to adopt the euro together with Latvia in January 2014. Let the first quarter (of 2013) pass, and we'll give it a thought." However, in January 2013, the Prime Minister announced that the government and the Bank of Lithuania had agreed on a target date of 2015. In February 2013, the government of Lithuania approved a plan for euro adoption in 2015. Publicly, Butkevičius and Loreta Graužinienė (then Speaker of the Seimas) reaffirmed by mid-January 2014 the need for euro adoption in 2015.

According to figures from the Bank of Lithuania, Lithuania had met 4 out of the 5 criteria by October 2013, the exception being the government deficit of 3.2% of GDP, exceeding the limit of 3.0%. The Lithuanian government expected this to decline to 2.9% by the first quarter of 2014. In April 2014, the European Parliament's Committee on Economic and Monetary Affairs gave their preliminary consent for Lithuania to join the eurozone on 1 January 2015, having concluded that the country was complying with all the criteria according to economic data from the first months of 2014. Lithuania's parliament approved a euro changeover law in April 2014, and in their biennial reports released on 4 June the European Commission found that the country satisfied the convergence criteria. The European Central Bank did not reach a conclusion on whether the country was ready to join the euro area. On 16 July, the European Parliament voted in favour of Lithuania adopting the euro. On 23 July, the EU Council of Ministers approved the decision, clearing the way for Lithuania to adopt the euro on 1 January 2015.

Convergence criteria
Assessment date	Country	HICP inflation rate (Note: The rate of change of the 12-month average HICP over the prior 12-month average must be no more than 1.5% larger than the unweighted arithmetic average of the similar HICP inflation rates in the 3 EU member states with the lowest HICP inflation. If any of these 3 states have a HICP rate significantly below the similarly averaged HICP rate for the eurozone (which according to ECB practice means more than 2% below), and if this low HICP rate has been primarily caused by exceptional circumstances (i.e. severe wage cuts or a strong recession), then such a state is not included in the calculation of the reference value and is replaced by the EU state with the fourth lowest HICP rate.)	Excessive deficit procedure		Exchange rate		Long-term interest rate (Note: The arithmetic average of the annual yield of 10-year government bonds as of the end of the past 12 months must be no more than 2.0% larger than the unweighted arithmetic average of the bond yields in the 3 EU member states with the lowest HICP inflation. If any of these states have bond yields which are significantly larger than the similarly averaged yield for the eurozone (which according to previous ECB reports means more than 2% above) and at the same time does not have complete funding access to financial markets (which is the case for as long as a government receives bailout funds), then such a state is not to be included in the calculation of the reference value.)	Compatibility of legislation
Assessment date	Country	HICP inflation rate	Budget deficit to GDP	Debt-to-GDP ratio	ERM II member	Change in rate (Note: The change in the annual average exchange rate against the euro.)	Long-term interest rate	Compatibility of legislation
2012 ECB Report (Note: Reference values from the ECB convergence report of May 2012.)	Reference values	Max. 3.1% (Note: Sweden, Ireland and Slovenia were the reference states.) (as of 31 Mar 2012)	None open (as of 31 Mar 2012)		Min. 2 years (as of 31 Mar 2012)	Max. ±15% (Note: The maximum allowed change in rate is ± 2.25% for Denmark.) (for 2011)	Max. 5.80% (Note: Sweden and Slovenia were the reference states, with Ireland excluded as an outlier.) (as of 31 Mar 2012)	Compliant (as of 31 Mar 2012)
2012 ECB Report	Reference values	Max. 3.1% (as of 31 Mar 2012)	Max. 3.0% (FY 2011)	Max. 60% (FY 2011)	Min. 2 years (as of 31 Mar 2012)	Max. ±15% (for 2011)	Max. 5.80% (as of 31 Mar 2012)	Compliant (as of 31 Mar 2012)
2012 ECB Report	Lithuania	4.2%	Open		7 years, 10 months	0.0%	5.19%	No
2012 ECB Report	Lithuania	4.2%	5.5%	38.5%	7 years, 10 months	0.0%	5.19%	No
2013 ECB Report (Note: Reference values from the ECB convergence report of June 2013.)	Reference values	Max. 2.7% (Note: Sweden, Latvia and Ireland were the reference states.) (as of 30 Apr 2013)	None open (as of 30 Apr 2013)		Min. 2 years (as of 30 Apr 2013)	Max. ±15% (for 2012)	Max. 5.5% (as of 30 Apr 2013)	Compliant (as of 30 Apr 2013)
2013 ECB Report	Reference values	Max. 2.7% (as of 30 Apr 2013)	Max. 3.0% (FY 2012)	Max. 60% (FY 2012)	Min. 2 years (as of 30 Apr 2013)	Max. ±15% (for 2012)	Max. 5.5% (as of 30 Apr 2013)	Compliant (as of 30 Apr 2013)
2013 ECB Report	Lithuania	2.7%	Open (Closed in June 2013)		8 years, 10 months	0.0%	4.42%	Not assessed
2013 ECB Report	Lithuania	2.7%	3.2%	40.7%	8 years, 10 months	0.0%	4.42%	Not assessed
2014 ECB Report (Note: Reference values from the ECB convergence report of June 2014.)	Reference values	Max. 1.7% (Note: Latvia, Portugal and Ireland were the reference states, with Greece, Bulgaria and Cyprus excluded as outliers.) (as of 30 Apr 2014)	None open (as of 30 Apr 2014)		Min. 2 years (as of 30 Apr 2014)	Max. ±15% (for 2013)	Max. 6.2% (Note: Latvia, Ireland and Portugal were the reference states.) (as of 30 Apr 2014)	Compliant (as of 30 Apr 2014)
2014 ECB Report	Reference values	Max. 1.7% (as of 30 Apr 2014)	Max. 3.0% (FY 2013)	Max. 60% (FY 2013)	Min. 2 years (as of 30 Apr 2014)	Max. ±15% (for 2013)	Max. 6.2% (as of 30 Apr 2014)	Compliant (as of 30 Apr 2014)
2014 ECB Report	Lithuania	0.6%	None		9 years, 10 months	0.0%	3.60%	Yes
2014 ECB Report	Lithuania	0.6%	2.1%	39.4%	9 years, 10 months	0.0%	3.60%	Yes

Criterion fulfilled
Criterion potentially fulfilled: If the budget deficit exceeds the 3% limit, but is "close" to this value (the European Commission has deemed 3.5% to be close by in the past), then the criteria can still potentially be fulfilled if either the deficits in the previous two years are significantly declining towards the 3% limit, or if the excessive deficit is the result of exceptional circumstances which are temporary in nature (i.e. one-off expenditures triggered by a significant economic downturn, or by the implementation of economic reforms that are expected to deliver a significant positive impact on the government's future fiscal budgets). However, even if such "special circumstances" are found to exist, additional criteria must also be met to comply with the fiscal budget criterion. Additionally, if the debt-to-GDP ratio exceeds 60% but is "sufficiently diminishing and approaching the reference value at a satisfactory pace" it can be deemed to be in compliance.
Criterion not fulfilled

== Public opinion ==
A poll by Eurobarometer in April 2013 found that 41% of Lithuanians supported switching to the euro, while 55% were opposed. This was a decrease in support of 3% from a year earlier. A September 2014 Eurobarometer poll found that 49% of Lithuanians were opposed to the introduction of the euro and 47% supported it.

Opinion polling in the run-up to the adoption of the euro produced a mixed set of results. A Baltic Surveys (Baltijos Tyrimai) face-to-face interview survey for the eurosceptic Europeans United for Democracy party conducted on 14–24 November found that 49% of Lithuanians disagree with their Government's decision to introduce the euro, while 26% of Lithuanians approved (5% fully, 21% rather in favour). 57% of respondents said the Government acted wrongly by introducing the euro without a referendum on the issue. However, a poll conducted by Berent Research Baltic for the Bank of Lithuania between 3 and 26 November showed that 53% of the population were in favour of the new currency while 39% were sceptical.

Since 2017, the support for the euro was steadily raising in Lithuania and in 2021 was 64%. According to the research by the European Central Bank published in 2025, a decade after the euro introduction in Lithuania, the support for the euro was at the all time high – 80%.

== Lithuanian euro coins ==
The designs of the Lithuanian coins share a similar national side for all denominations, featuring the Vytis symbol and the name of the country, "Lietuva". The design was announced on 11 November 2004 following a public opinion poll conducted by the Bank of Lithuania. It was created by the sculptor Antanas Žukauskas. The only difference between the coins is that the one and two euro coins have vertical lines on the outer circle, the fifty, twenty and ten cent coins have horizontal lines on the outer circle, and the five, two and one cent coins have no lines on the outer circle. In January 2014 it was announced that all coins will have "2015" minted on them to display the year of Lithuania's euro adoption. The Lithuanian Mint was chosen to produce the coins.

Depiction of Lithuanian euro coinage | Obverse side
€0.01	€0.02	€0.05
"Vytis" from the Coat of arms of Lithuania
€0.10	€0.20	€0.50
"Vytis" from the Coat of arms of Lithuania
€1.00	€2.00	€2 Coin Edge
		"LAISVĖ, VIENYBĖ, GEROVĖ" "Freedom, Unity, Prosperity" in Lithuanian
"Vytis" from the Coat of arms of Lithuania		"LAISVĖ, VIENYBĖ, GEROVĖ" "Freedom, Unity, Prosperity" in Lithuanian

For the design of images on the common side and a detailed description of the coins, see euro coins.

=== Lithuanian Ethnographical Regions series ===
Year	Number	Design
2019	1	Arms of Žemaitija (Samogitia)
2020	2	Arms of Aukštaitija (Highland)
2021	3	Arms of Dzūkija (Dainava)
2022	4	Arms of Suvalkija (Sudovia)
2025	5	Arms of Mažoji Lietuva (Lithuania Minor)

== Accession to the eurozone ==
Lithuania officially joined the eurozone at midnight on the morning of 1 January 2015, with the Lithuanian Central Bank offering an exchange rate of 3.4528 LTL to one euro. Immediately after the start of the New Year, Prime Minister Butkevicius made the country's first cash withdrawal in euros. It was reported that nearly all of the nation's cash machines would be dispensing euros within 30 minutes of the New Year. In Brussels, the European Commission building was draped with a banner welcoming Lithuania to the eurozone.

Euro adoption day	Changeover plan	Introduction	Frontloading	Dual circulation period	Exchange of LTL cash period	Dual price display	Mint company	Currency circulated (in units)
1 January 2015	A changeover law was passed in April 2014	Big-Bang	Commercial banks starts receiving euro banknotes and coins respectively 2 and 3 months before €-day. Retailers receive coins and banknotes during the last month before €-day.	15 days	Banks: 12 months (notes); 6 months (coins); Central bank: indefinitely	Start 30 days after Council approval of euro adoption, equal to 22 Aug.2014, and lasts until 6 or 12 months after adoption	Lithuanian Mint	132 million banknotes, 370 million coins

The European Commission recommended in November 2014 that Lithuania extend the legally required dual price display period by six additional months, so that it would last until 31 December 2015. Lithuania did not adopt the recommendation and the required dual price display ended on 1 July 2015.

=== Rotation of voting rights in the ECB Governing Council ===
On 17 June 2014 the Deutsche Bundesbank released a statement stating that "Lithuania could cause the ECB Governing Council's voting rights to rotate. The virtually certain introduction of the euro in this small Baltic nation at the beginning of next year would cause the number of national central bank (NCB) governors on the ECB Governing Council to exceed 18 for the first time. It would trigger a changed voting procedure designed to ensure that decisions can still be taken effectively in a growing Eurosystem. This would pave the way for the introduction of a modified voting system similar to that of the US Federal Reserve System."

== See also ==
- 2004 enlargement of the European Union
- Lithuanian euro coins
- Lithuanian litas
- Enlargement of the eurozone
- International status and usage of the euro
- Economic and monetary union
- History of the euro
- European Currency Unit
- European Central Bank
- European Union
- European Economic Community
- History of Lithuania
- Cauliflower revolution
