= Coins of the Lithuanian litas =

The coinage of the Lithuanian litas was introduced in 1993 and was used until the introduction of the euro in 2015. It was composed of coins denominated in centas (plurals centai and centų) and litas (plurals litai and litų)

Lithuanian coins can be converted into euros indefinitely at the Bank of Lithuania.

== 1, 2, and 5 centai ==
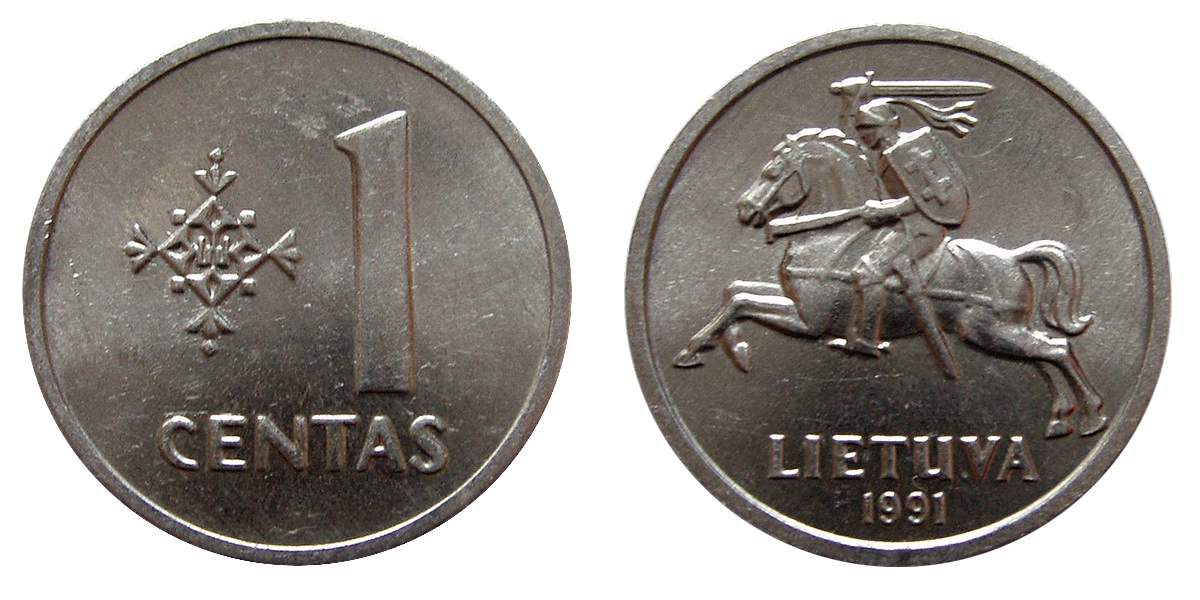
1 centas - 1991 release

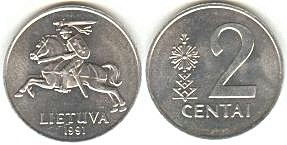
2 centai - 1991 release

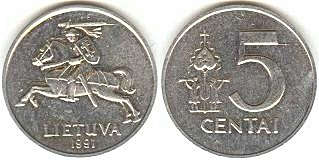
5 centai - 1991 release

These coins were made from aluminium and therefore are white. The coins' edge is plain. They were designed by sculptor Petras Garška. These coins are the first permanent coins released after the restoration of independence in 1990. Unlike other coins they bear the same date - 1991 - no matter the year of actual production. The design has not changed even though they bear an old version of the coat of arms (the horse's tail looks down instead of up, the knight is leaning forward, and other details).

People usually referred to these coins as "balti centai" (white cents) which has a slightly negative connotation.

=== Specifications ===
- 1 centas coin (€0.003): diameter - 18.75 mm, thickness - 1.30 mm, weight - 0.83 g. The 1 centas coin has a square ornament with triangle tulips in each corner. In the center there is a symbol of the columns of Gediminas.
- 2 centai coin (€0.006): diameter - 21.75 mm, thickness - 1.30 mm, weight - 1.12 g. The 2 centai coin has an ornament shaped as a primitive spindle. It is composed of three open triangles and a stylized sun pattern on the top. The sun pattern is composed of 16 elements.
- 5 centai coin (€0.015): diameter - 24.40 mm, thickness - 1.35 mm, weight - 1.4 g. The 5 centai coin has an ornament shaped as a wind vane. The central element is a leaf. On top of the ornament is a cross. Both sides of the leaf have a decorative element, a small snake. Below are two small angels blowing trumpets.

== 10, 20, and 50 centų ==
10 centų - 1997 release

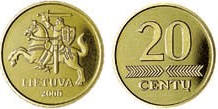
20 centų - 1997 release

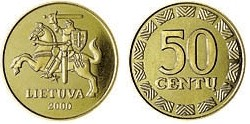
50 centų - 1997 release

These coins were made from a gold-yellow alloy of copper, zinc, and nickel. The edges are milled. The coins were designed by Antanas Žukauskas with the help of Arvydas Každailis in adapting the coat of arms. They were released in 1997 and replaced the 10, 20, and 50 centų coins released in 1991. These coins bore the year in which they were produced in.

=== Specifications ===
- 10 centų coin (€0.029): diameter - 17 mm, thickness - 1.7 mm, weight - 2.6 g. The 10 centų coin has an ornamental triangular fir tree pattern in the background. The triangle points downwards and the apex is matched to the vertical axis of the coin.
- 20 centų coin (€0.058): diameter - 20.5 mm, thickness - 2.1 mm, weight - 4.8 g. The 20 centų coin has a horizontal ornamental "fir tree" pattern under the number 20.
- 50 centų coin (€0.145): diameter - 23 mm, thickness - 2.1 mm, weight - 6 g. The 50 centų coin has an ornamental fir tree pattern divided into fourteen equal parts which runs alongside the rim.

== 1, 2, and 5 litai ==
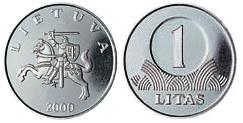
1 litas - 1998 release

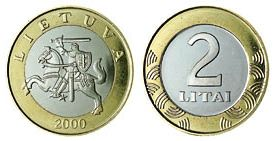
2 litas - 1998 release

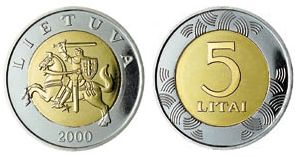
5 litas - 1998 release

These coins were made from a white alloy of copper and nickel; and from a gold-yellow alloy of copper, aluminium, and nickel. The coins were designed by Antanas Žukauskas with the help of Arvydas Každailis in adapting the coat of arms. They were released in 1998 and replaced the 1, 2, and 5 litai banknotes. The primary reason for the change was that these banknotes were short-lived due to their high use in everyday trade, being subject to wear and tear and needing to be constantly re-printed in foreign countries, while the new coins could be minted domestically at the Lithuanian Mint. They bear the year in which they were produced in. People sometimes complained that the coins were too heavy.

=== Specifications ===
- 1 litas coin (€0.290): diameter - 22.3 mm, thickness - 2.2 mm, weight - 6.25 g. The 1 litas coin has an edge that is rimmed. The number 1 is in a hollow circle located in the upper part of the coin. Under the circle there is a symmetrical ornament formed by a series of curved bars.
- 2 litai coin (€0.579): diameter - 25 mm, thickness - 2.2 mm, weight - 7.5 g. The 2 litai coin has an edge that is divided into 5 rimmed sections parted by gaps of plain surface. 3 central bars of each section are thicker than the rest. The outside circle has an ornament formed of 2 groups of curved bars that are positioned symmetrically to the vertical axis of the coin.
- 5 litai coin (€1.448): diameter - 27.5 mm, thickness - 2.35 mm, weight - 10.1 g. The 5 litai coin edge has an inscription: PENKI LITAI (five litai) repeated twice and separated by a mark. The outside circle bears an ornament formed from three evenly spaced groups of curved bars.

== Commemorative circulation coins ==
"Lithuanian Mint" releases 3-6 commemorative coins yearly. In addition, there are 4 circulation commemorative coins released, all in 1 litas domination. They all are from a 75% copper and 25% nickel alloy.

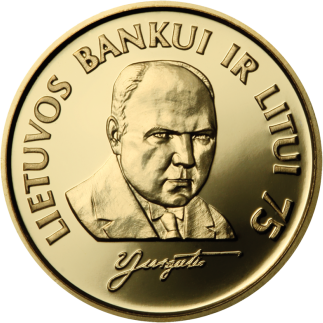
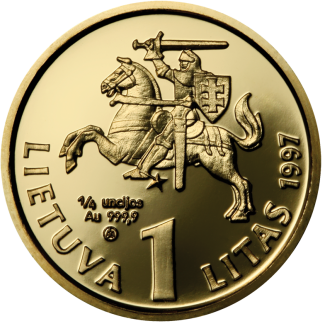
1997 release - Bank of Lithuania 75th anniversary
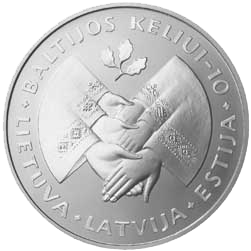
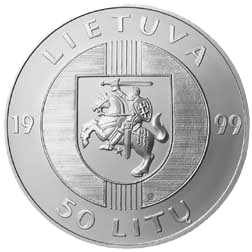
1999 release - Baltic way 10th anniversary
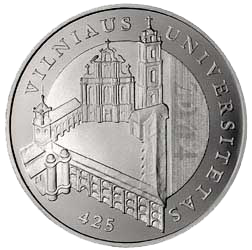
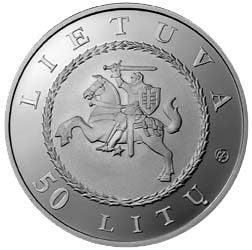
2004 release - Vilnius University 425th anniversary
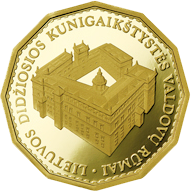
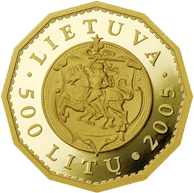
2005 release - dedicated to Lithuania's Royal Palace

=== Specifications ===
- 1997 release - for the 75th anniversary of the litas and Bank of Lithuania (200,000 pieces). Coin's diameter is 22.30 mm, thickness - 2.20 mm, weight - 6.25 g. This coin bears the portrait and signature of the first chairman of Bank of Lithuania Vladas Jurgutis (1885–1966) whose signature is the first litas banknotes released in the interwar period. The same design, size, and denomination coin was also minted in gold (1,500 pieces). It was designed by sculptor Rimantas Eidėjus.
- 1999 release for the 10th anniversary of the Baltic way, when about two million people formed a live 600 kilometer chain protesting against the Soviet occupation (1,000,000 pieces). Coin's diameter is 22.30 mm, thickness - 2.20 mm, weight - 6.25 g. The reverse shows three pairs of hands holding. The clothes are stylized traditional clothes of the three Baltic States. Also, hands are feminine - a symbol of three Baltic sisters (in Lithuanian language all three Baltic states' names are feminine nouns). This coin was criticized for having Lithuania, Latvia, and Estonia names on it: it confuses which country's coin it is. The same design was used to mint the 50 litų silver coin of 38.61 mm diameter (4,000 pieces). The only change in design was the edge of the silver coin has an inscription VILNIUS RYGA TALINAS (Vilnius, Riga, Tallinn - the capitals of three Baltic states in Lithuanian). The designer is Antanas Žukauskas.
- 2004 release for the 425th anniversary of Vilnius University in 2004 (200,000 pieces). Coin's diameter is 22.30 mm, thickness - 2.20 mm, weight - 6.25 g. The reverse shows Vilnius University architectural ensemble, emphasizing the great courtyard and St. John's church and its belfry. This image is somewhat similar to the reverse of 100 litų banknotes. The same design was used to mint the 50 litų silver coin of 38.61 mm diameter (2,000 pieces). The only 2 changes in design was that the silver coin's edge is inscribed with UNIVERSITAS VILNENSIS (when Vilnius University was founded in 1579, it was called Academia et Universitas Vilnensis) and that the silver coin has a field that changes appearance: from one angle it shows 2004 (date of coin release) and 1579 (date of founding Vilnius University) from another. This is the first time such technology was used in Lithuanian coins. The coin was designed by Rytas Jonas Belevičius.
- 2005 release to promote restoration of the Palace of the Grand Dukes of Lithuania (Valdovų Rūmai) in 2005 (1,000,000 pieces). Coin's diameter is 22.30 mm, thickness - 2.20 mm, weight - 6.25 g. This coin uses coat of arm image found on Grand Duchy of Lithuania coins, and not the modern one. This old coat of arms and the dodecagon it has inside its rims creates an impression that the coin is one of the old Great Duchy coins. This illusion was created to emphasize the importance of cultural heritage. The reverse shows how Lithuania's Royal Palace will look like when its reconstruction is complete in 2009 for the 1000th anniversary of Lithuania's name (Lithuania was first mentioned as Litua in 1009 in Quedlinburg monastery's chronicle). The coin was designed by Giedrius Paulauskis.

== Former designs ==
=== First litas ===
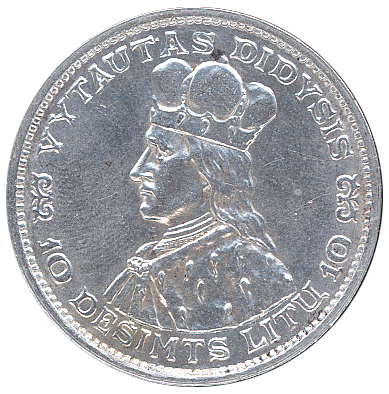
10 Litų - 1936 release (Aversum)

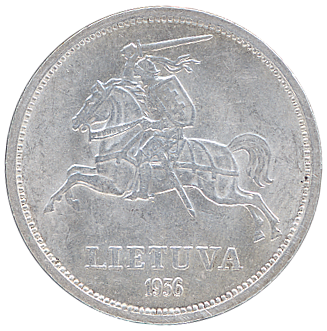
5 Litai - 1936 release (Reversum)

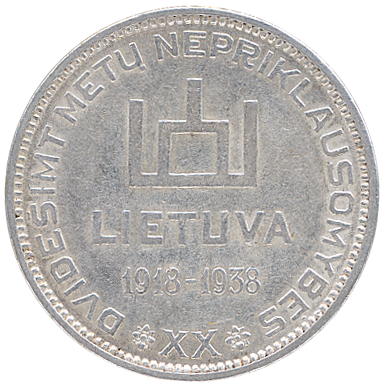
10 Litų - 1938 release (Aversum)

=== Second litas ===
10 centų - 1991 release

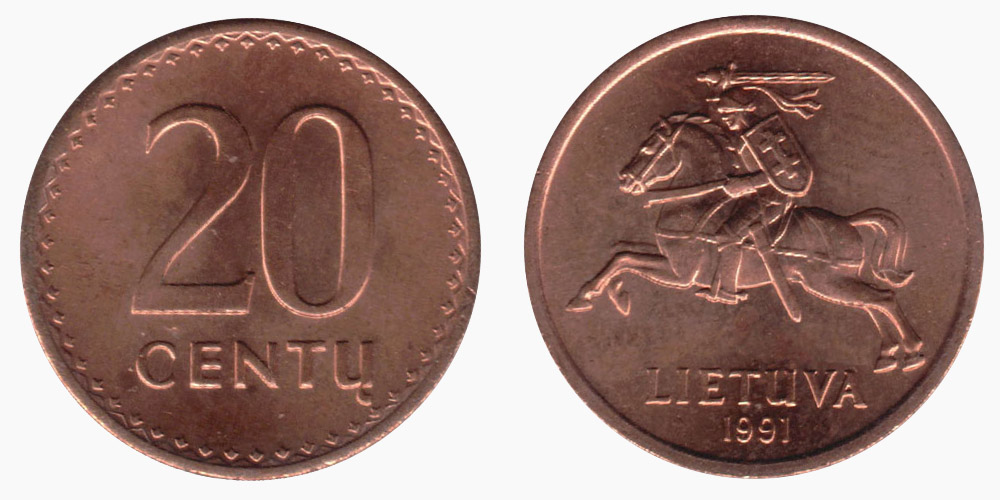
20 centų - 1991 release

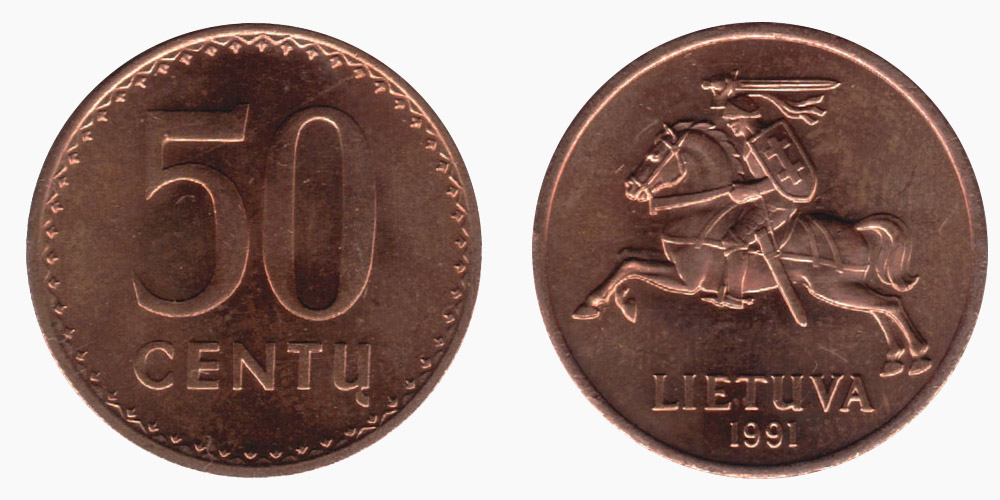
50 centų - 1991 release

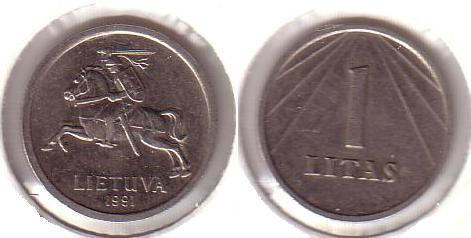
1 litas - 1991 release

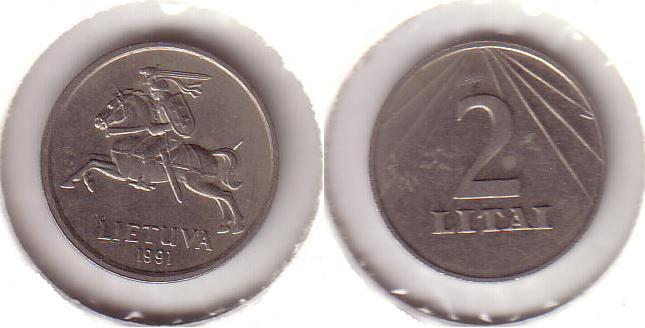
2 litai - 1991 release

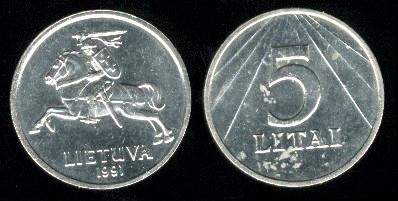
5 litai - 1991 release

== See also ==
- Lithuanian euro coins
