= Lithuanian talonas =

Former currency of Lithuania

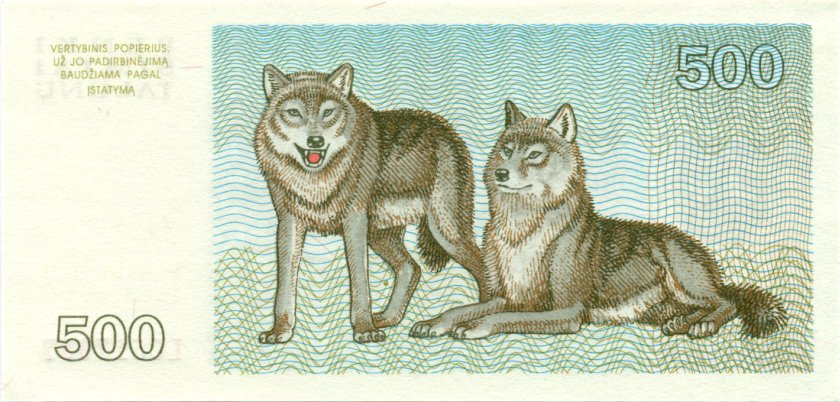
- Final edition of 500 talonai displaying gray wolves

ISO 4217
- Code: none
- Subunit

Demographics
- Date of introduction: 5 August 1991
- Replaced: Soviet ruble
- Date of withdrawal: 25 June 1993
- Replaced by: Lithuanian litas
- User(s): Lithuania
- This infobox shows the latest status before this currency was rendered obsolete.

The talonas (from a Lithuanian word for "coupon") was a temporary currency issued in Lithuania between 1991 and 1993. It replaced the Soviet ruble at par and was replaced by the litas at a rate of 100 talonai = 1 litas. The talonas was only issued as paper money.

== The first talonas reform ==
Year	Inflation rate (%)	
	In Lithuania	In Russia
1991	225	N/A
1992	1,100	2,508.8
1993	409	849.9
1994	45.1	215.1
1995	35.7	175.0
1996	13.1	21.8
1997	8.4	11.0
1998	2.4	84.4
1999	1.5	36.5
Sources , ,

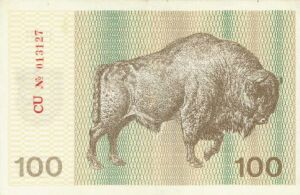
Example of the first edition 100 talonai, with a wisent depicted.

On 5 August 1991, as a response to public complaints about inflation, the Lithuanian government introduced the talonas, paid out as a supplement to the salaries in rubles. It was a quick and unforeseen reform pushed by the Prime Minister of Lithuania Gediminas Vagnorius. At first, it was very similar to ration coupons: every person received 20% of his/her salary in talonas up to a maximum of 200 talonai. In order to buy goods other than food, the price had to be paid in rubles and again in talonas (for example, if a product cost 50 rubles, a person had to pay 50 rubles and 50 talonai to buy it). That was done to prevent foreigners from other Soviet states to take goods out of the country - foreigners who only had rubles were unable to acquire the goods.

This system was widely criticized. First of all, in no way did it address the reasons why there were shortages of goods, i.e., it did not promote supply; it just limited demand. Also, the demand for expensive goods (like home appliances) dropped sharply because people needed a lot of time to accumulate the necessary amount of talonas to buy them. It caused bottlenecks in the supply chain and further damaged already troubled production. In addition, the scheme could not prevent hyperinflation of the ruble because the talonas was not an independent currency; it was a supplementary currency with a fixed exchange rate to the ruble. The system tried to encourage Lithuanians to save 80% of their salaries. But people accumulated their rubles and had nowhere to spend them. It led to the inflation of goods that did not require the talonas (like food or goods on the black market).

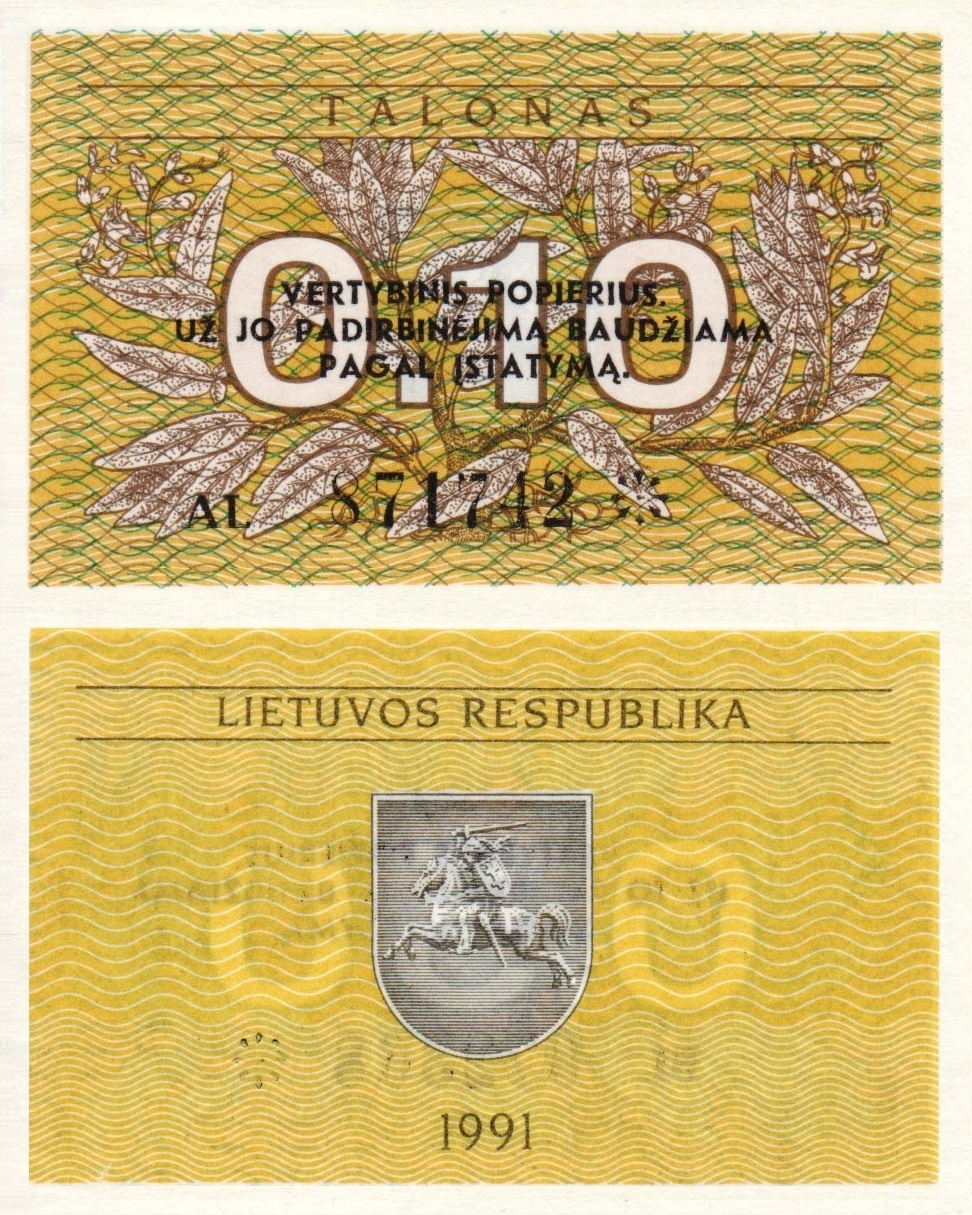
0.10 talonas

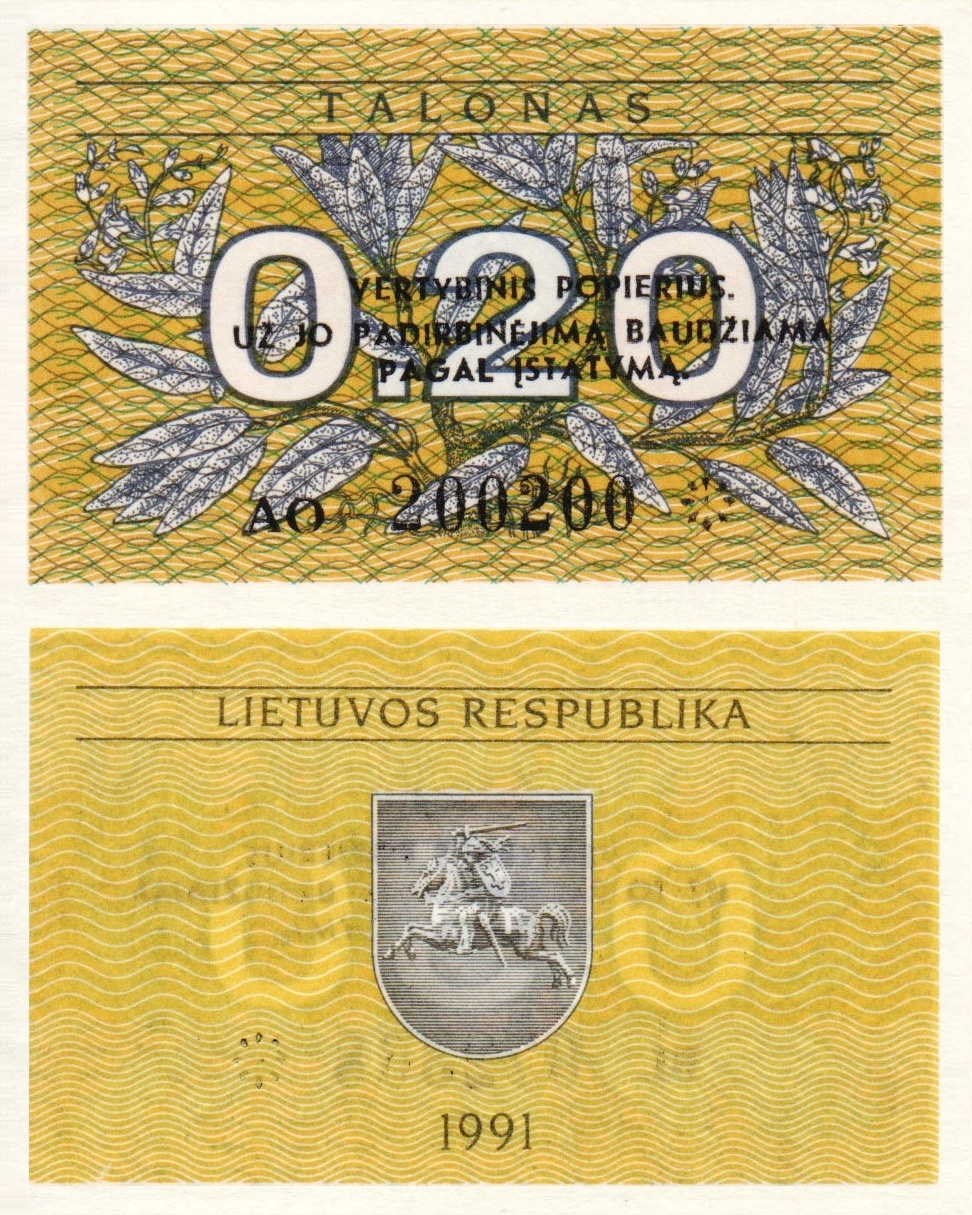
0.20 talonas

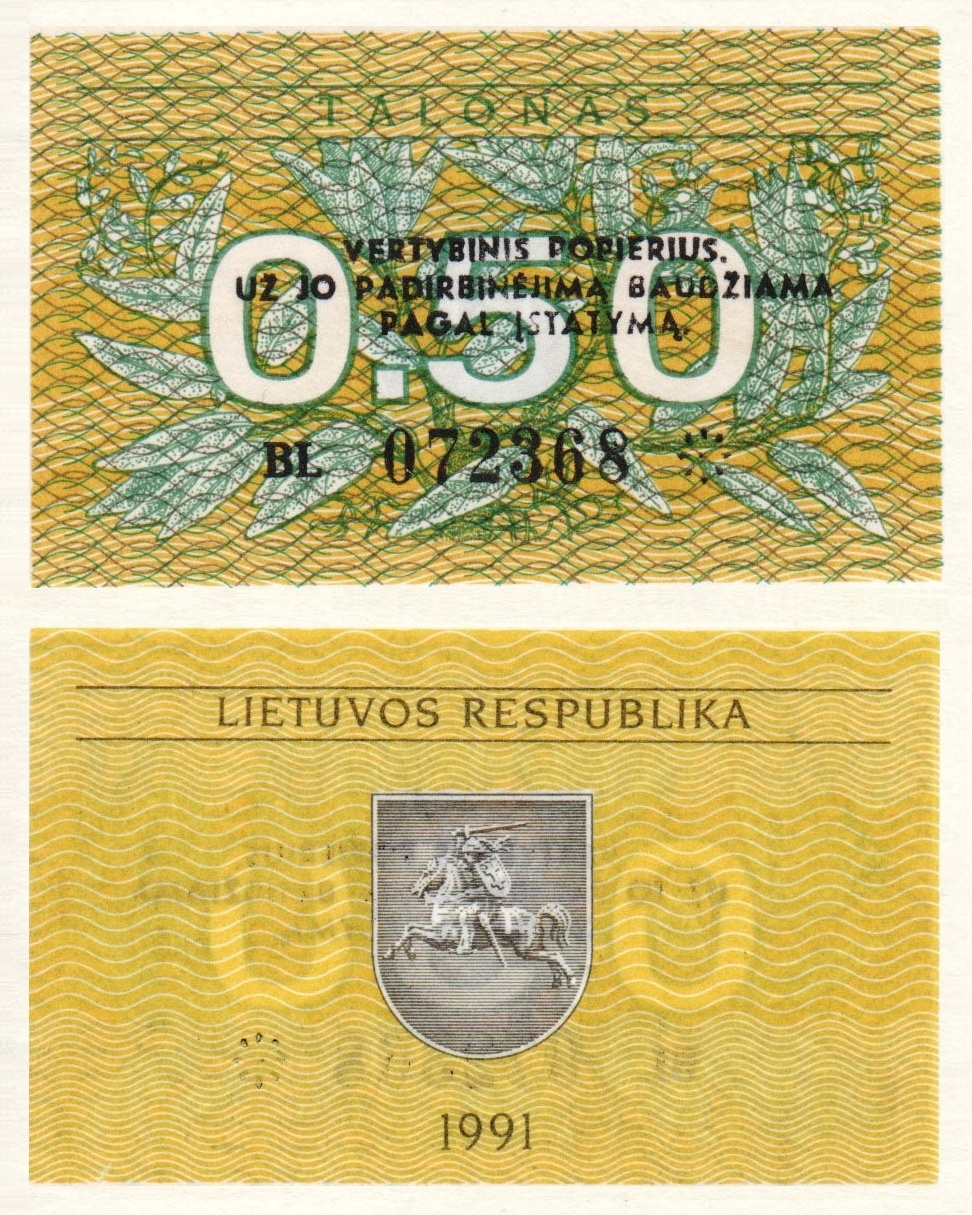
0.50 talonas

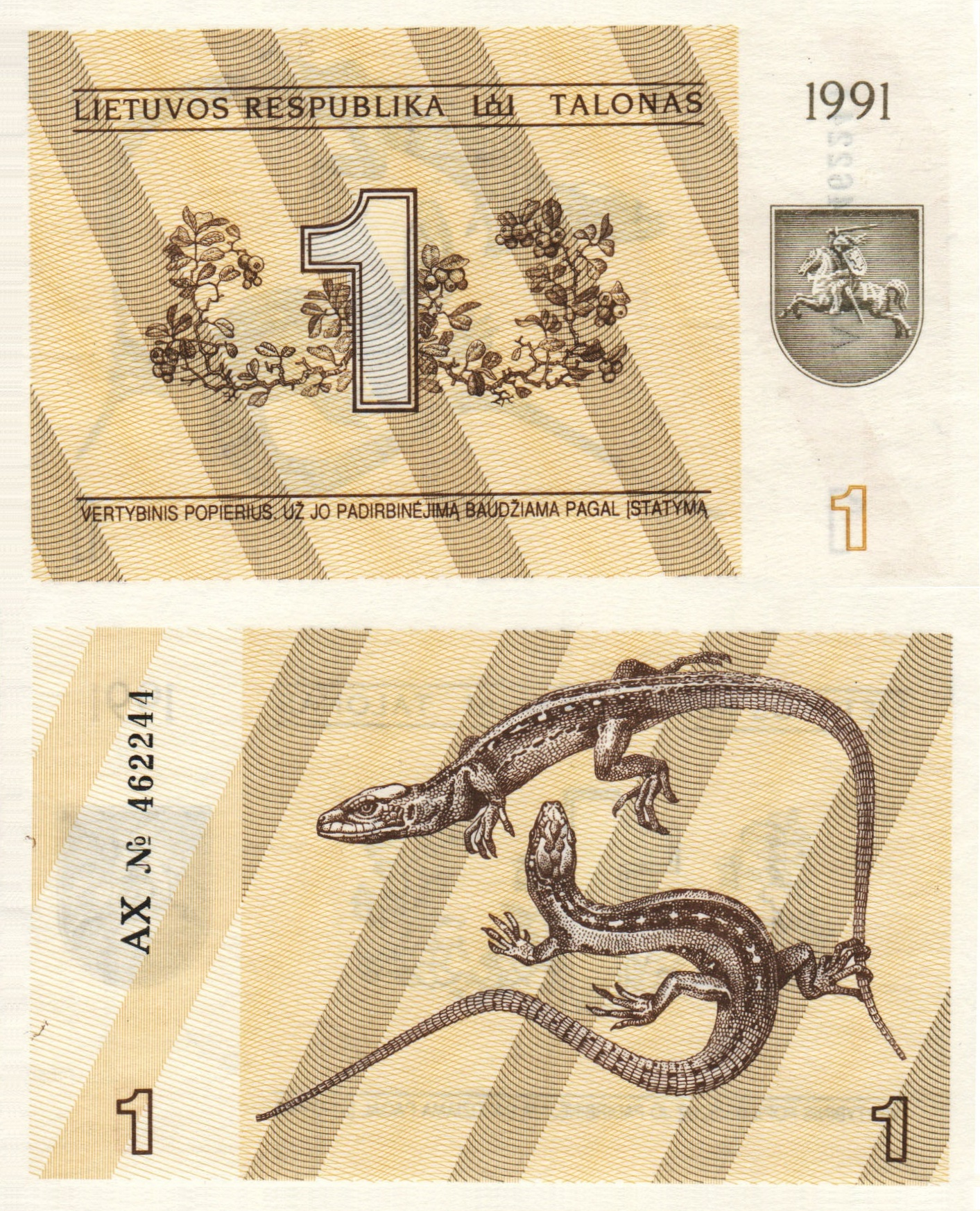
1 talonas

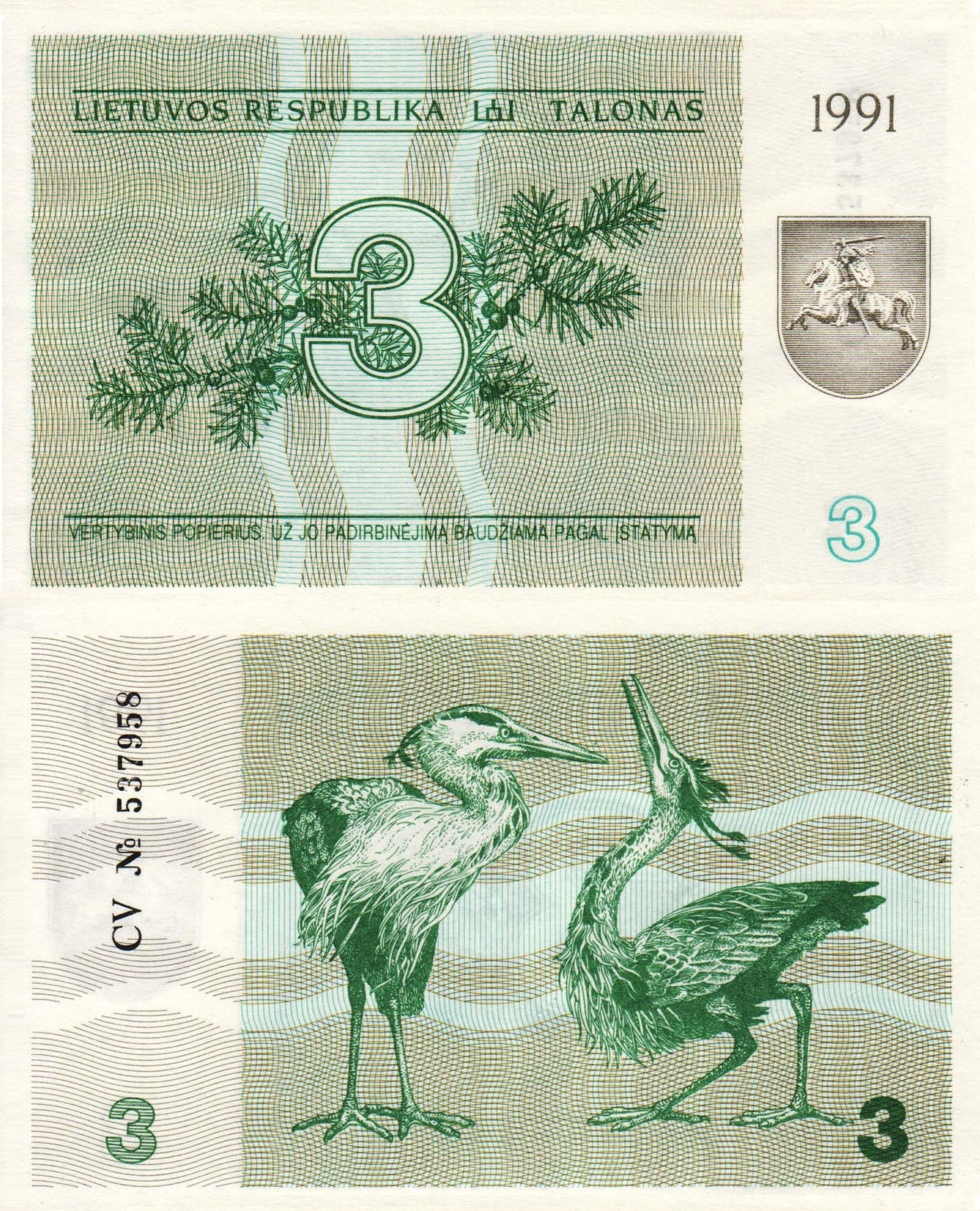
3 talonai

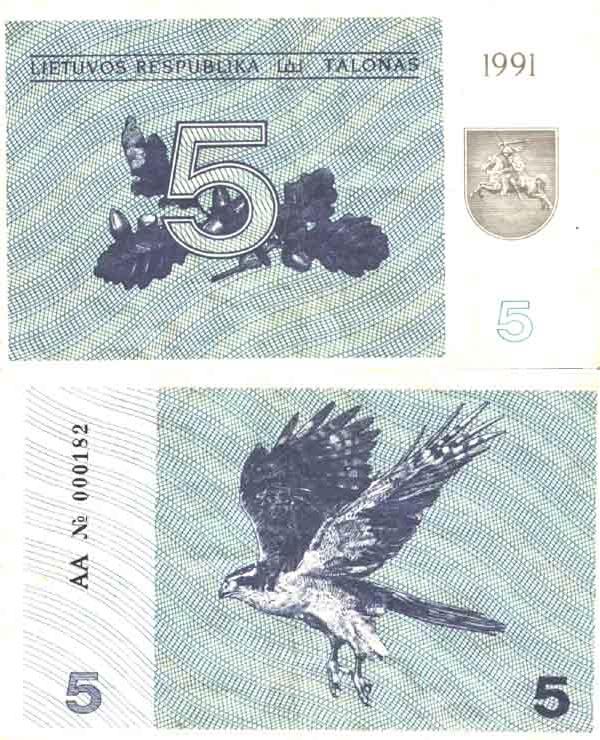
5 talonai

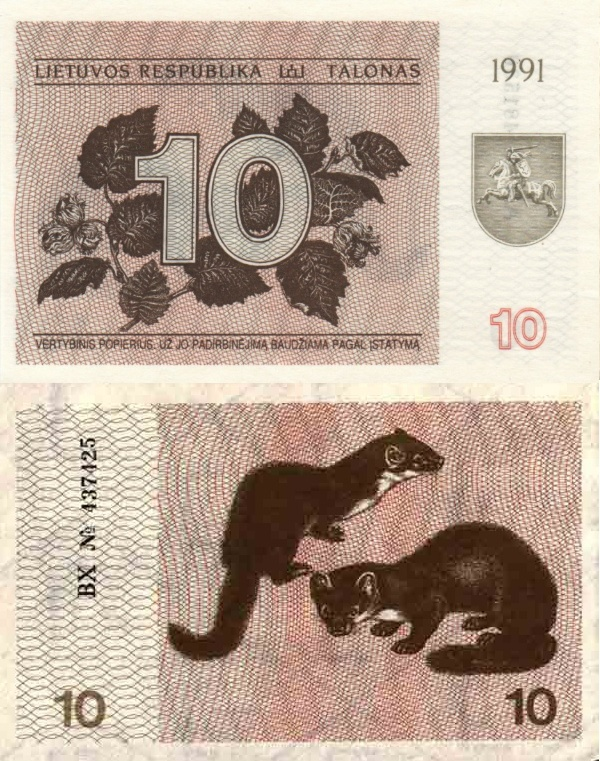
10 talonai

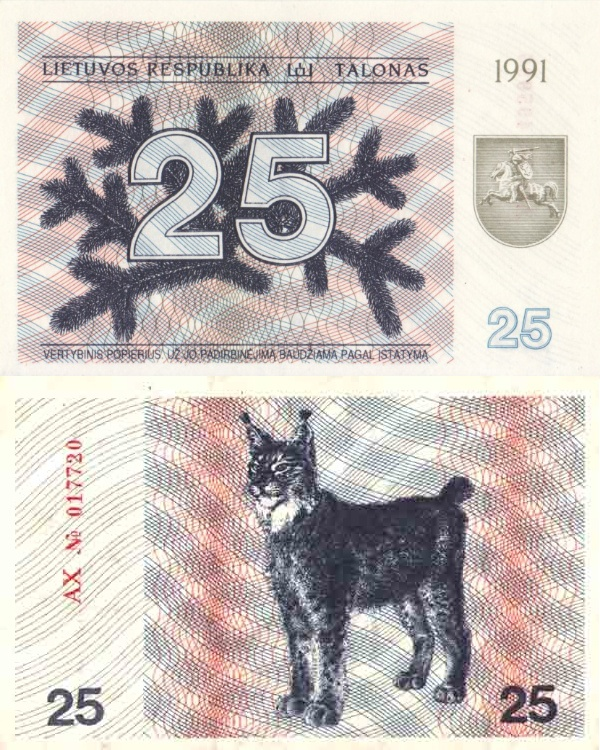
25 talonai

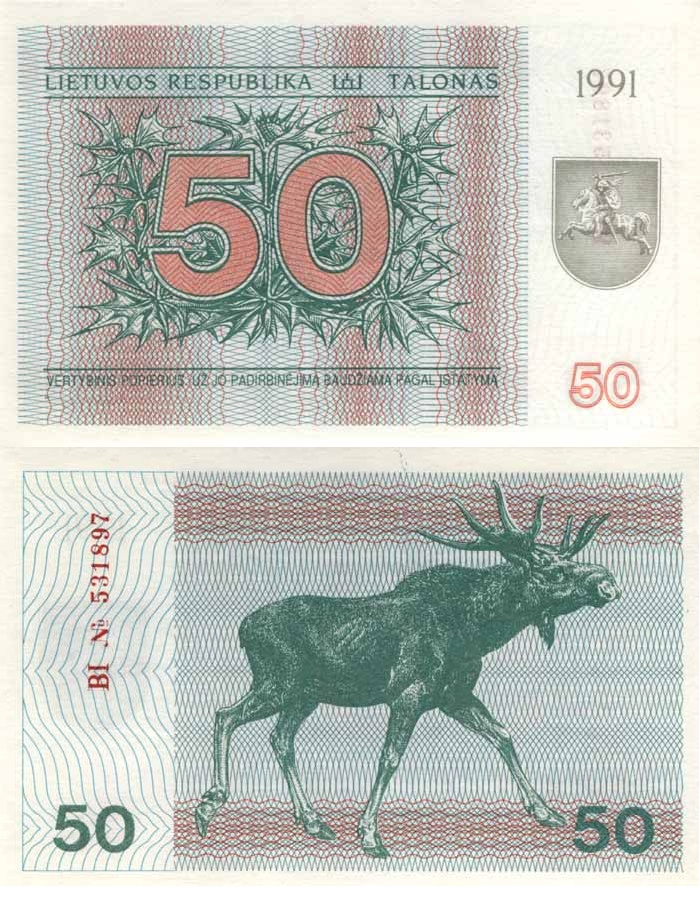
50 talonai

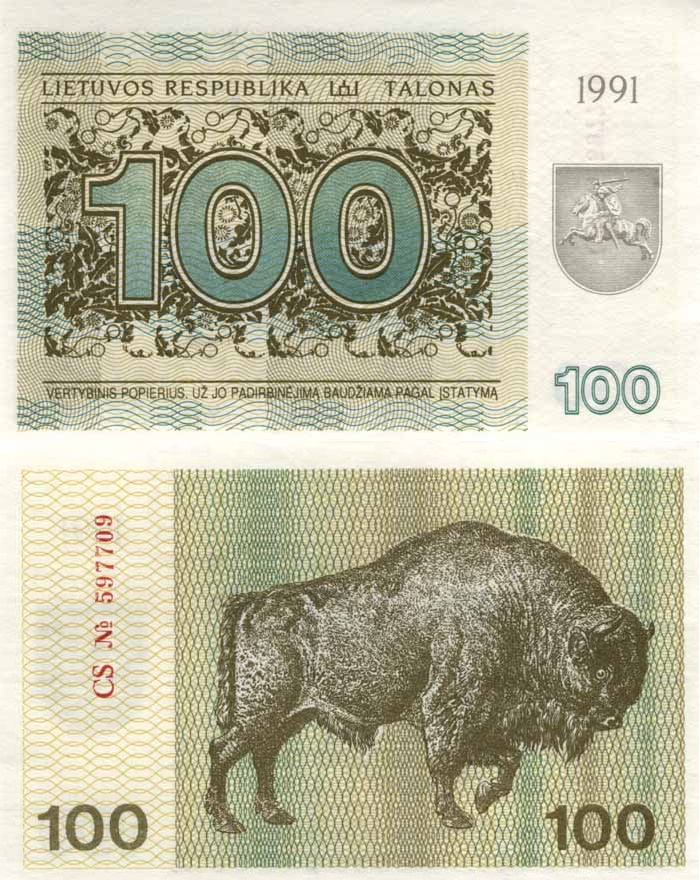
100 talonai

== The second talonas reform ==
In the summer of 1992, everybody anticipated that the talonas would shortly be replaced by a permanent currency, the litas. Lithuania was desperately lacking cash (some workers were paid in goods rather than in cash) as Russia tightened its monetary policy. In addition, litas coins and banknotes had already been produced and shipped to Lithuania from abroad. However, on 1 May 1992, it was decided to reintroduce the talonas as an independent, temporary currency to circulate alongside the ruble in hopes to deal with inflation. A dual currency system was created. On 1 October 1992, the ruble was completely abandoned and replaced by the talonas. Lithuania was the last of the Baltic states to abandon the ruble. The self-imposed deadlines to introduce the litas were continuously postponed without clear explanations.

Nicknamed "Vagnorkės" or "Vagnoriukai" after Gediminas Vagnorius or "zoo tickets" after various animals native to Lithuania featured on the notes, the talonas did not gain public trust or respect. The banknotes were small and printed on low quality paper. People were reluctant to use them. Nevertheless, the talonas served its purpose: inflation at the time was greater in Russia than in Lithuania. Inflation in 1992 rose steadily due to an energy price spike after Russia increased oil and gasoline prices to world levels and demanded to be paid in hard currency.

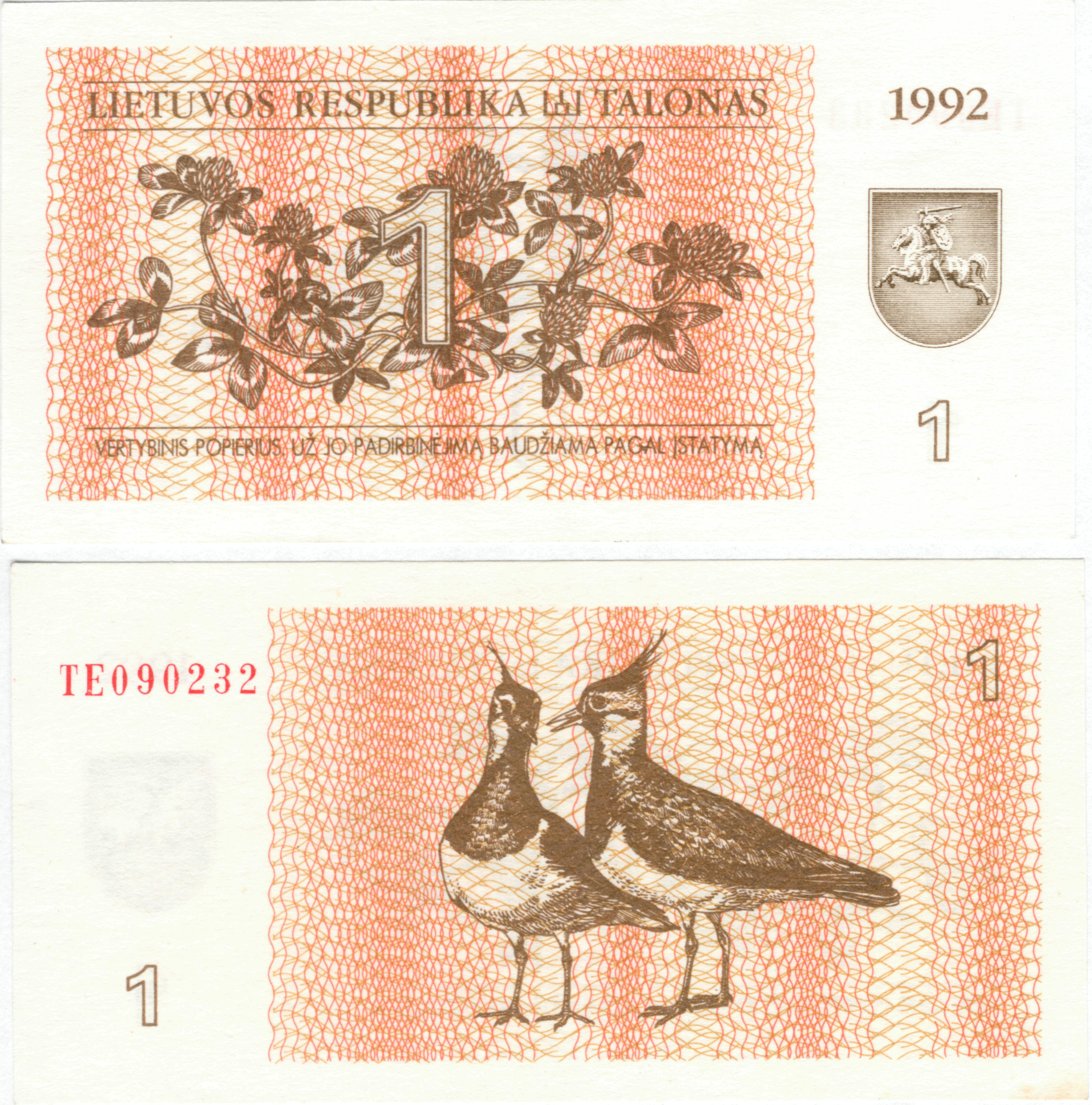
1 talonas

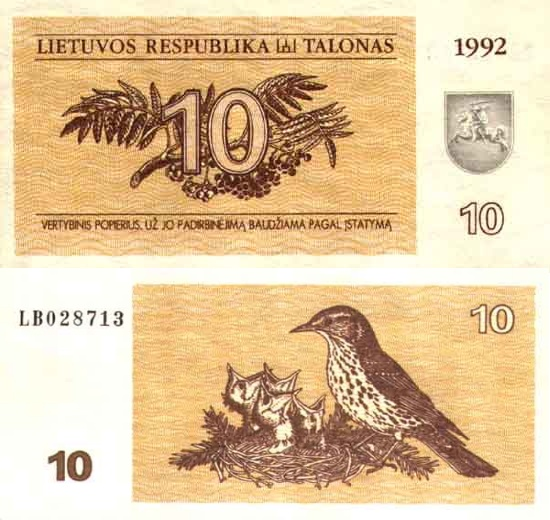
10 talonai

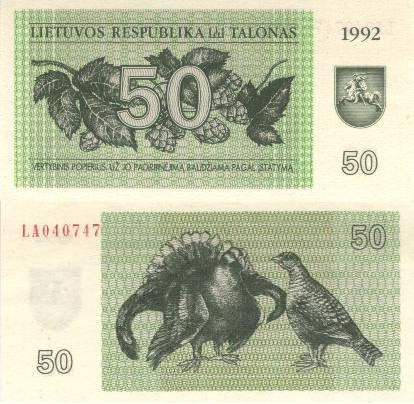
50 talonai

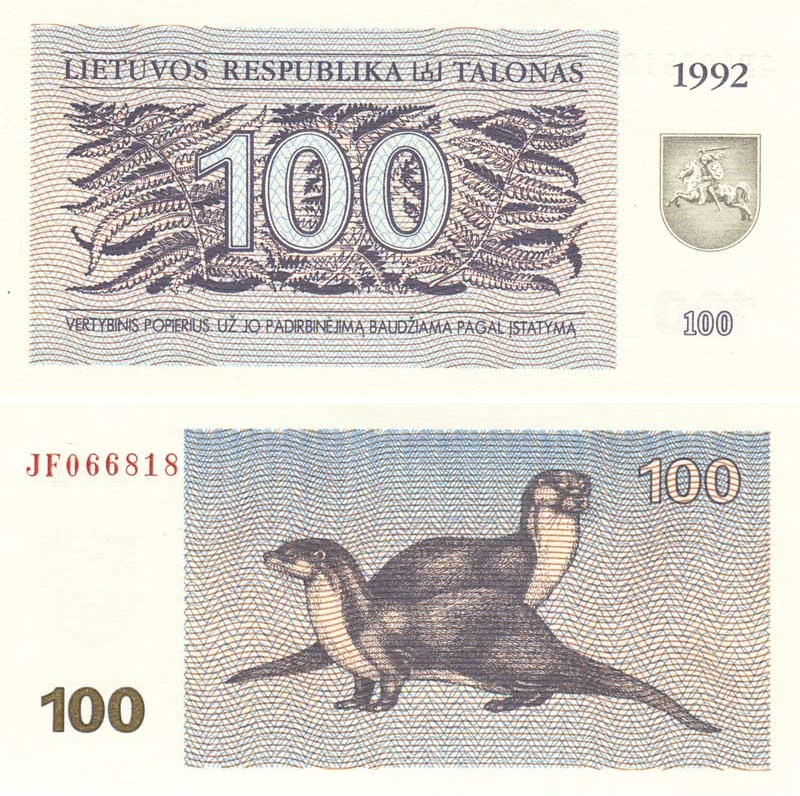
100 talonai

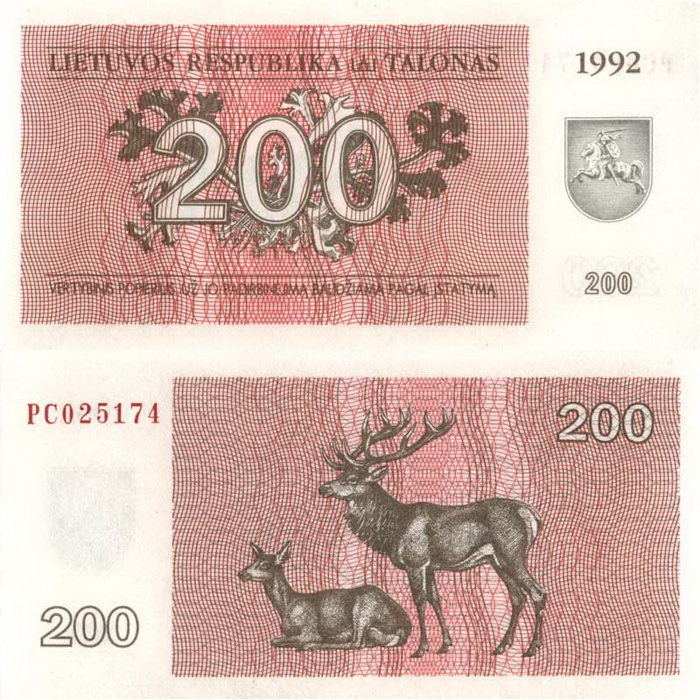
200 talonai

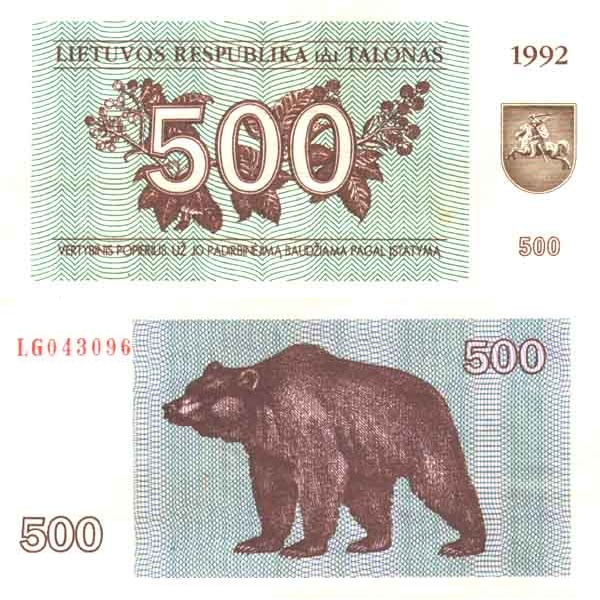
500 talonai

On 25 June 1993, the litas was introduced at the rate of 1 litas = 100 talonas. Worthless talonas were recycled into toilet paper in the Grigiškės paper factory.

== Banknotes ==
In 1991, notes were issued in denominations of 0.10, 0.20, 0.50, 1, 3, 5, 10, 25, 50, and 100 talonas. In 1992, notes were issued for 1, 10, 50, 100, 200, and 500 talonas, followed by new designs of the 200 and 500 talonas notes in 1993.

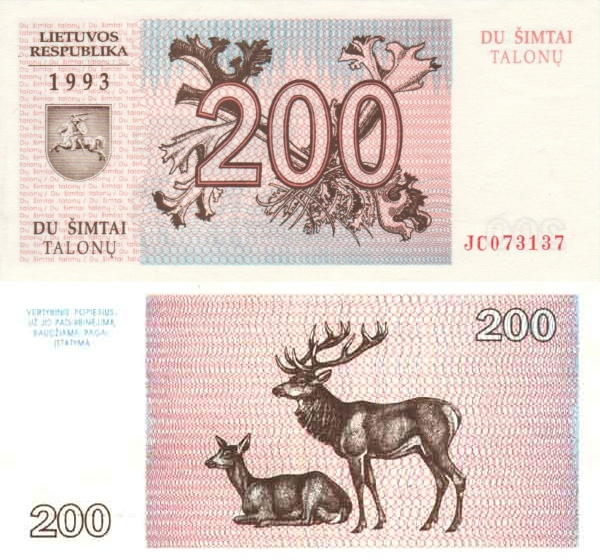
200 talonas (1993)

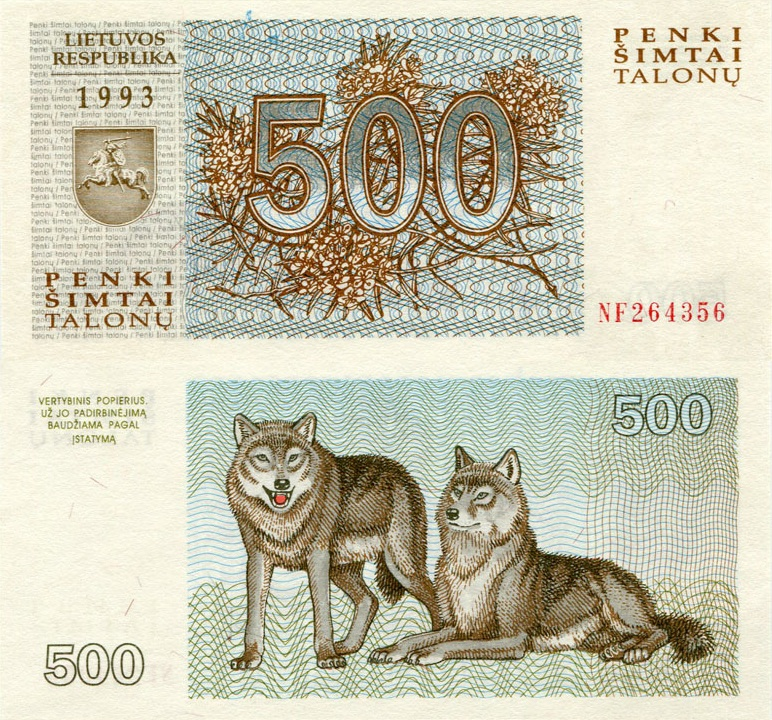
500 talonas (1993)

Lithuanian talonas
Preceded by: Soviet ruble Reason: introduction of temporary currency Ratio: 1 talonas = 1 or 10 rubles	Currency of Lithuania; 1 May 1992 – 26 June 1993	Succeeded by: Lithuanian litas Reason: introduction of permanent currency Ratio: 1 litas = 100 talonas
