= Cauliflower revolution =

2016 protest in Lithuania

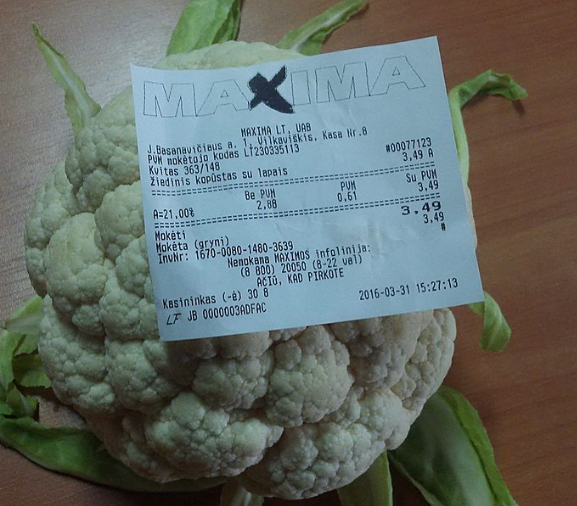
Cauliflower price

The cauliflower revolution (Lithuanian: Kalafiorų revoliucija) was a spontaneous Lithuanian protest started by a resident of the southwestern Lithuanian town of Vilkaviškis in 2016. She had bought a head of cauliflower at a Maxima supermarket in Vilkaviškis, paying €3.49 for one head of cauliflower. She posted the photo on Facebook, and soon tens of thousands of Lithuanians shared the post, going viral by tapping into negative sentiment stirred up by recent public discussions on rapidly rising prices and a comparatively slow growth of salaries after the euro was introduced to Lithuania in 2015. A spontaneous three-day boycott occurred, between May 10 and 12, of the four main supermarket chains (which controlled 80% of food distribution in Lithuania), Maxima, Iki, Rimi, and Norfa.

== Opinions ==
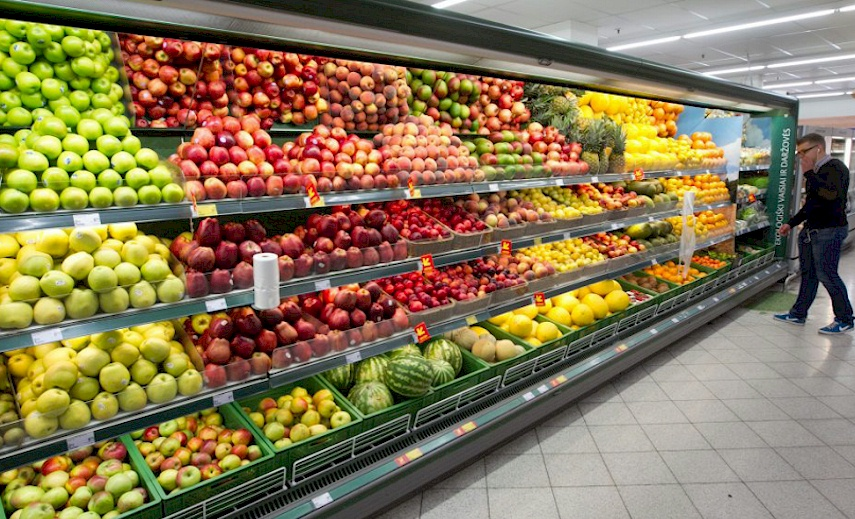
Food store with few customers during boycott

Algirdas Butkevičius, Lithuania’s prime minister, said that most goods are imported from nations in the eurozone, and therefore, price changes are due to reasons such as market challenges, bad harvests, etc. Nerijus Mačiulis, the chief economist at Swedbank said that the escalation in cauliflower prices was caused by a seasonal hike in global demand.
