= Lithuanian Mint =

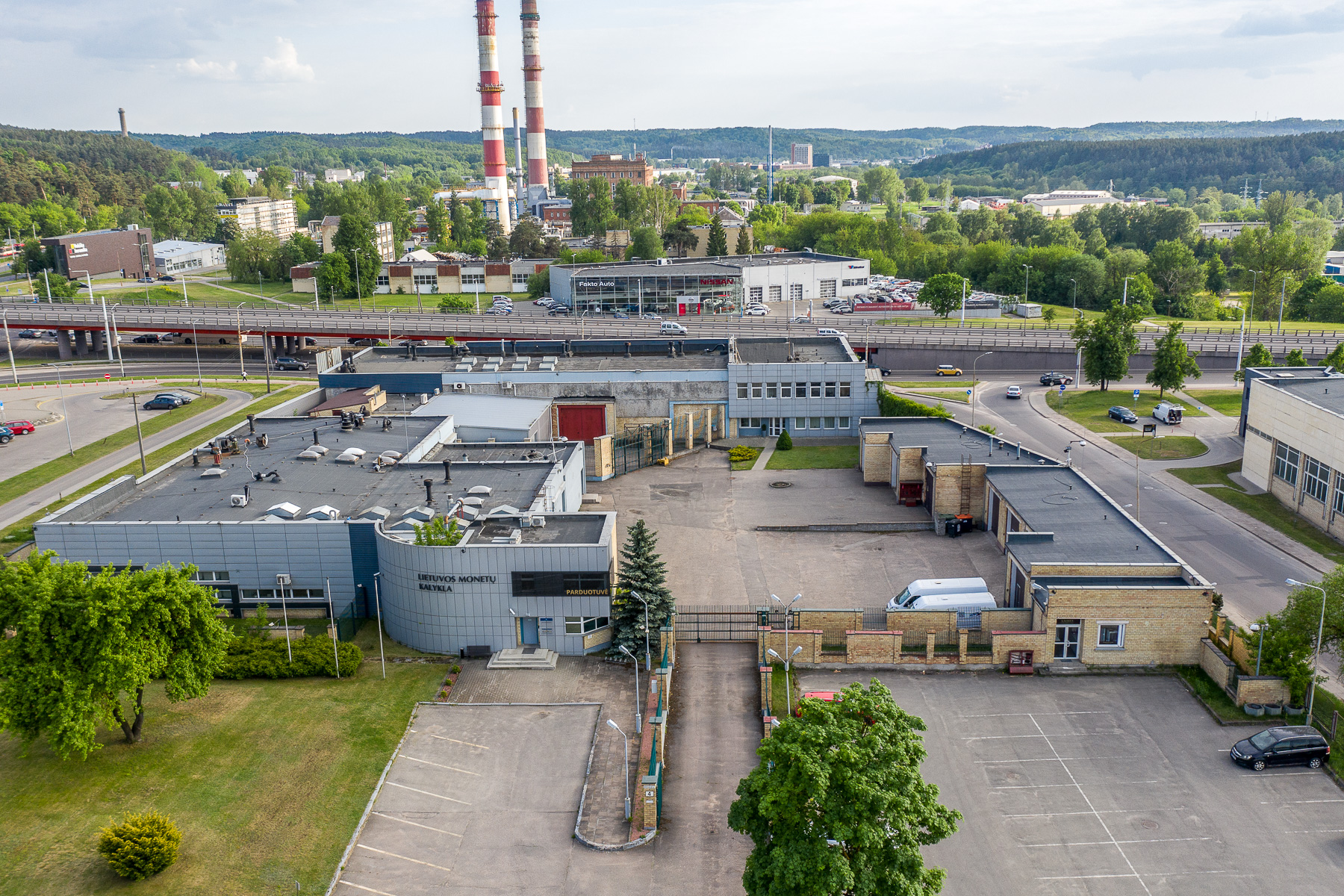
- The Lithuanian Mint in Eigulių Street 4, Vilnius
- Industry: Metalworking
- Founded: 10 December 1990; 35 years ago
- Headquarters: Vilnius, Lithuania
- Area served: Lithuania
- Key people: CEO -Donatas Sirgedas
- Products: coins, medals
- Website: kalykla.lt

Lithuanian Mint (Lithuanian: Lietuvos monetų kalykla) is the state-owned enterprise, responsible for the mintage of coins and decorations of Lithuania. The shareholding is managed by the central bank of Lithuania. Lithuanian mintage tradition traces its history back to Algirdas times, when in Vilnius, capital city of Lithuania, the Vilnius Mint was established. The Lithuanian Mint in its current form was established by the government on 10 December 1990, and it started minting 1, 2, and 5 centas coins for general circulation in 1992. From 1993 onwards, the mint also started producing collectors coins and commemorative medals. The mint was chosen to create the Lithuanian Euro coins upon the country entering the Eurozone in 2015. The mint also offers the service of buying and storing gold bars.
