= Lithuanian euro coins =

Lithuanian euro coins share a similar national side for all denominations, featuring the Vytis symbol and the name of the country, "Lietuva". The design was announced on 11 November 2004 following a public opinion poll conducted by the Bank of Lithuania. It was created by the sculptor Antanas Žukauskas. The only difference between the coins is that the one and two euro coins have vertical lines on the outer circle, the fifty, twenty and ten cent coins have horizontal lines on the outer circle, and the five, two and one cent coins have no lines on the outer circle. The Lithuanian Mint was chosen to produce the coins.

== Lithuanian euro design ==
For the design of images on the common side and a detailed description of the coins, see euro coins.

Depiction of Lithuanian euro coinage | Obverse side
€0.01	€0.02	€0.05
"Vytis" from the Coat of arms of Lithuania
€0.10	€0.20	€0.50
"Vytis" from the Coat of arms of Lithuania
€1.00	€2.00	€2 Coin Edge
		"LAISVĖ, VIENYBĖ, GEROVĖ" "Freedom, Unity, Prosperity" in Lithuanian
"Vytis" from the Coat of arms of Lithuania		"LAISVĖ, VIENYBĖ, GEROVĖ" "Freedom, Unity, Prosperity" in Lithuanian

== Circulating mintage quantities ==
Face Value	€0.01	€0.02	€0.05	€0.10	€0.20	€0.50	€1.00	€2.00
2015	70,000,000	70,000,000	60,000,000	35,000,000	35,000,000	40,000,000	35,000,000	25,000,000
2016	20,000,000	—N/a	—N/a	—N/a	—N/a	—N/a	—N/a	—N/a
2017	22,000,000	23,000,000	—N/a	14,000,000	6,000,000	—N/a	—N/a	12,000,000
2018	s	s	s	s	s	s	s	s
2019	s	s	s	s	s	s	s	s
2020	s	s	s	s	s	s	s	5,000,000
2021	s	s	3,000,000	3,000,000	s	s	s	5,000,000
2022	s	s	2,000,000	s	s	s	s	s
2023	s	s	8,000,000	5,000,000	s	s	s	s
2024	s	s	9,000,000	s	s	s	s	3,000,000
— No coins were minted that year for that denomination s Small quantities minted for sets only

== €2 commemorative coins ==
Year	Subject	Volume

=== Lithuanian Ethnographical Regions series ===
Including Samogitia, Aukštaitija, Dzūkija, Suvalkija and Lithuania Minor

Year	Number	Design	Volume
2019	1	Samogitia's coat of arms	
2020	2	Aukštaitija's coat of arms	
2021	3	Dzūkija's coat of arms	
2022	4	Suvalkija's coat of arms	
2025	5	Lithuania Minor's coat of arms	

== See also ==
- Euro gold and silver commemorative coins
- Adoption of the euro in Lithuania
