= Andrius Vaišnys =

Lithuanian journalist and historian (born 1963)

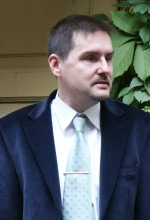
- Born: July 17, 1963 (age 63); Vilnius, Lithuania
- Education: Vilnius University
- Occupations: professor, journalist, historian
- Organization: Vilnius University

Andrius Vaišnys (born 17 July 1963) is a Lithuanian journalist and a professor at Vilnius University and the former Dean of the university's Faculty of Communication. Member of the Lithuanian Academy of Sciences.

== Biography ==
Andrius Vaišnys studied at Vilnius University, graduating with a Master of Journalism degree in 1989. In 2003, defended the dissertation in Humanities "The Press and the State in Lithuania in 1918–1940". Since 2014, Professor at Vilnius University.

For a decade, from 2007 to 2017, Vaišnys held the position of Dean of the Faculty of Communication.

Since its inception in 2004, Vaišnys is Editor-in-chief of the scholarly journal Parliamentary Studies of the Martynas Mažvydas National Library of Lithuania and since 2009, chairman of the journal's Editorial Board. Since 2008, Editor-in-Chief of the journal Journalism Research of Vilnius University.

Vaišnys worked as the Head of the Public Relations Unit at the Office of the Seimas of the Republic of Lithuania and Head of the Press Service of the Seimas from 1997 until 2006. In 1998, prepared and implemented the concept "Open Seimas" endorsed by the Board of the Seimas.

From 2003 to 2016, Vaišnys was the public secretary of the Lituanica Committee organised by an order of the Seimas of the Republic of Lithuania in which he prepared programmes for commemorating personalities important for the Lituanica heritage presented to the Ministry of Culture.

Member of the Expert Commission for the Celebration of State-Important Events (appointed by the Order of the Minister of Culture of 16 April 2018).

While at Vilnius University, Vaišnys initiated and prepared the bachelor study programme "Creative Communication" (implemented since 2012).

Another institution, other than Vilnius University, with which Vaišnys was often closely associated in his career is the Martynas Mažvydas National Library of Lithuania. From 2011 he was the Chairman of the Scientific Council until being assigned the Director of this Library's Department of Communication and Information in 2020

Aside from his then ongoing obligations to Vilnius University and to the National Library, 2021 marked the year in which Vaišnys was appointed a member of the Supreme Electoral Commission on the recommendation of the President of the Republic of Lithuania.

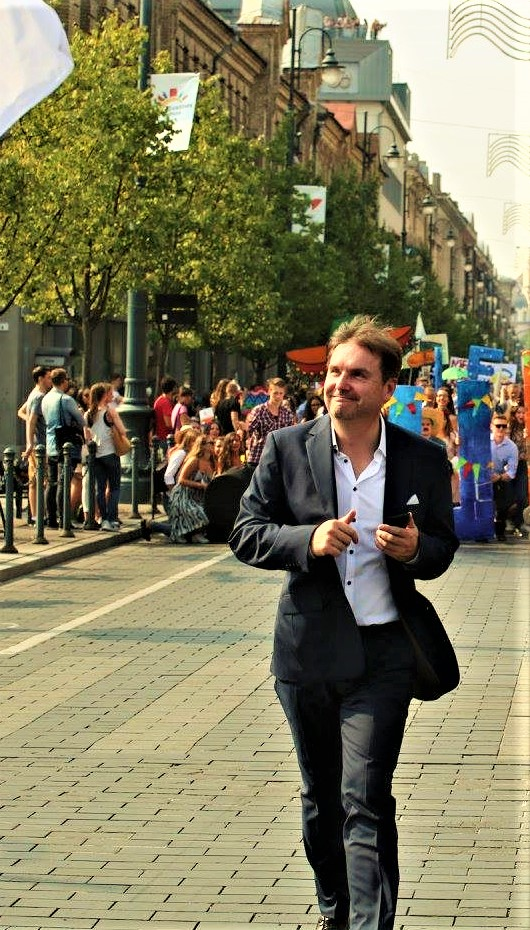
A. Vaišnys in 2015

== Research interests ==
Vaišnys' research interests include the relationship between the state and media, political communication, development of state-sponsored propaganda, development of parliamentarism, and cultural policy.

== Creative activities ==
Author of the play "She is an Apostle" (staged by the Marijampole Drama Theater on 12/01/2023). Vaišnys is the author of the libretto to Algirdas Martinaitis' opera Pasaulio dangoraižis ("The Skyscraper of the World"), which premiered in 2008.

Bibliography
