= Lithuanian Academy of Sciences =

Society of scientists and institute in Lithuania

- Lietuvos mokslų akademija

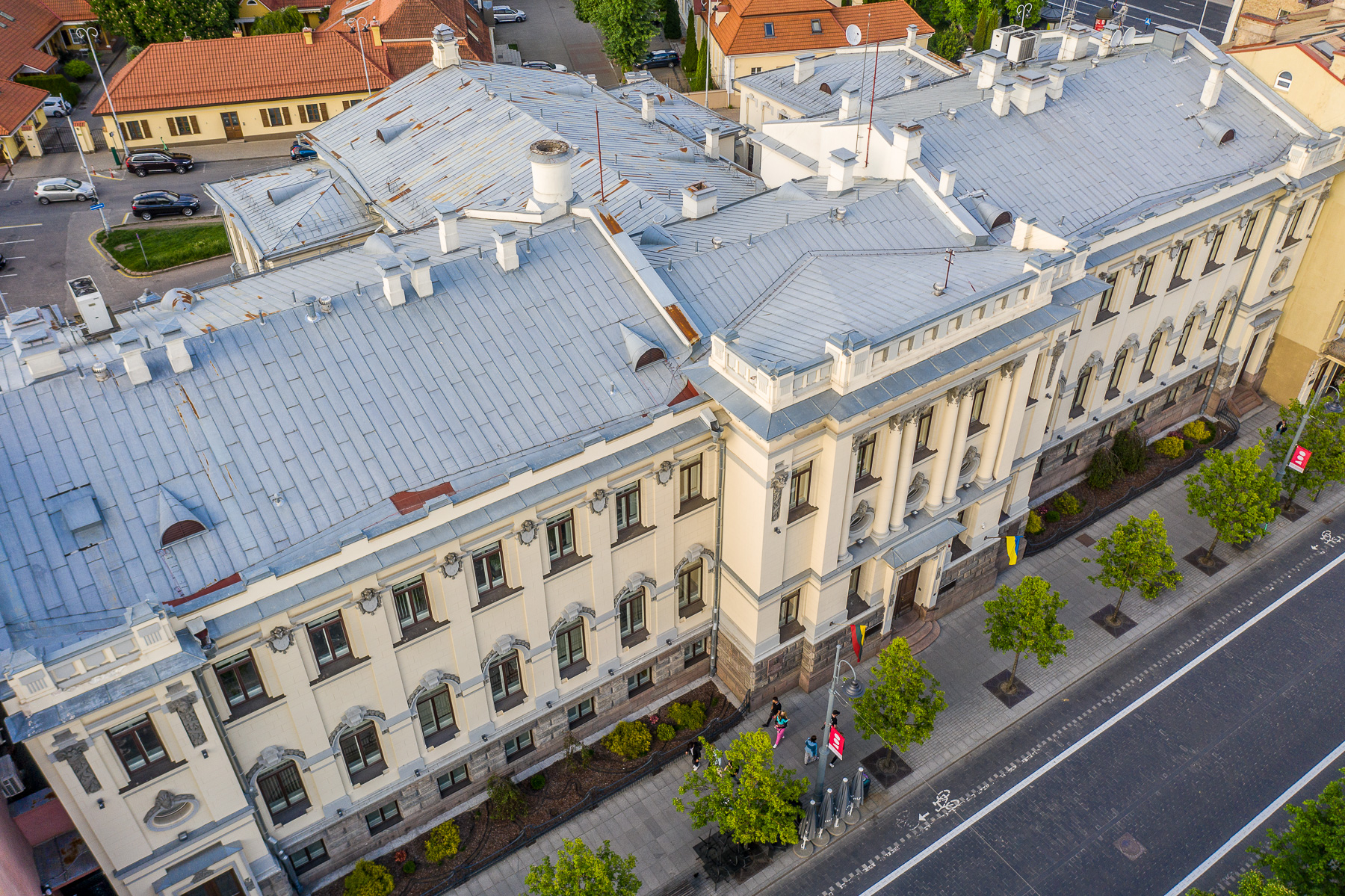
- Headquarters of the Lithuanian Academy of Sciences
- Formation: 16 January 1941; 85 years ago
- Type: Academy of sciences
- Headquarters: Gedimino pr. 3, Vilnius, Lithuania
- Coordinates: 54°41′11″N 25°17′05″E
- President: Vytautas Nekrošius
- Website: lma.lt

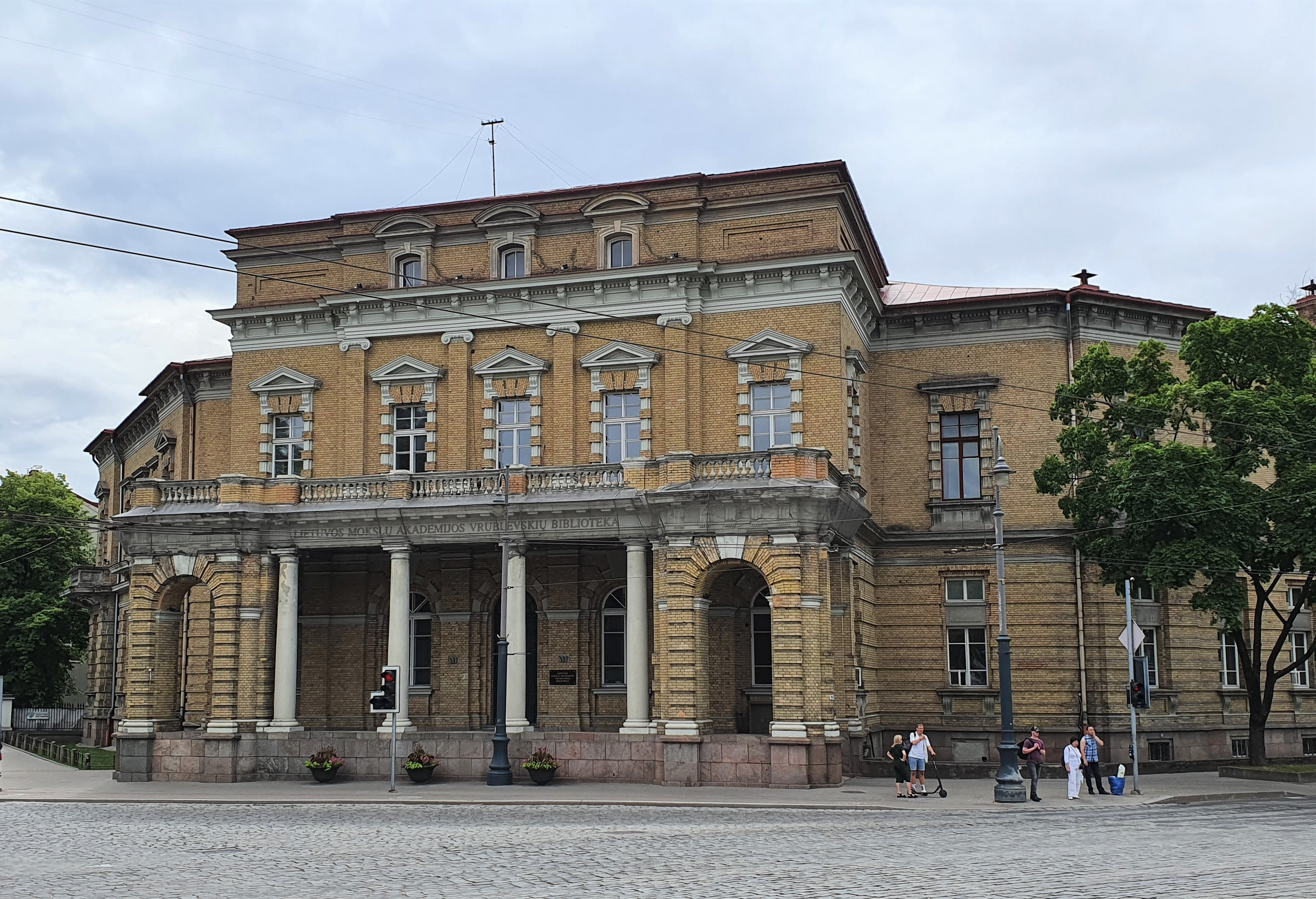
The Wroblewski Library of the Lithuanian Academy of Sciences

The Lithuanian Academy of Sciences or LMA (Lithuanian: Lietuvos mokslų akademija, Latin: Academia Scientiarum Lithuaniae) is a state-funded independent organization in Lithuania dedicated for science and research. Its mission is to mobilize prominent scientists and initiate activities that would strengthen the welfare of Lithuania and contribute to the scientific, social, cultural and economic development of the country.

== History ==
The idea of establishing the Lithuanian Academy of Sciences was proposed in 1773 by Marcin Odlanicki Poczobutt and other members of Vilnius University in the Grand Duchy of Lithuania, but it was not implemented due to wars and conflicts in the region. The idea of an independent institution for science and research was revived during the Lithuanian National Revival with the main proponents of it being the members of the Lithuanian Scientific Society, including Jonas Basanavičius and Jonas Šliūpas. However, the implementation began only in 1939, initially with the establishment of the Institute of the Lithuanian Language. The institute was a basis of the Lithuanian Academy of Sciences which was formally established on 16 January 1941. Its first president was Vincas Krėvė-Mickevičius.

On 9 June 1988, the Sąjūdis movement was started from the Academy’s conference hall. In 1989, the Lithuanian Academy of Sciences was declared independent from the Academy of Sciences of the Soviet Union, and in March 1990, the Academy declared its decision to be independent of any public or political institution. In 1991, the Law on Research and Higher Education was adopted and LMA was reorganized. On 18 March 2003, the Seimas passed the Statute of the Academy of Sciences.

== Activities ==
The LMA is governed by its charter which is approved by the Parliament of Lithuania. It can elect 120 members (under 75 years of age) and an unlimited number of foreign members as well as emeriti over 75 years of old.

The academy represents Lithuania in All European Academies, International Council for Science, European Academies' Science Advisory Council and InterAcademy Partnership. In addition to founding several scientific institutions and foundations, it issues publications and textbooks, sponsors symposia and conferences. It has established 15 memorial prizes and awards, encourages young scientists and students to engage in research by annually awarding 10 prizes to young scientists and 15 prizes to students. Since 2008, together with the Bank of Lithuania, it grants Vladas Jurgutis Award.

=== Lithuanian Science Prize ===
Since 1993, the LMA supervises the process and facilitates the yearly awards of the Lithuanian Science Prize (Lithuanian: Lietuvos mokslo premija). The LMA and other academic institutions nominate the candidates. The winners are decided by the Commission for Lithuanian Science Prizes which is assembled by the government. There can be no more than 7 awards in the following areas: humanitarian science, social science, natural science (may be 2 awards), medicine and health science, agricultural science and technical science.

As of 2025, the monetary award for the prize is €54,600.

== Structure ==
LMA consists of the following scientific divisions:

- Humanities and Social Sciences
- Mathematical, Chemical and Physical Sciences
- Biological, Medical and Geosciences
- Agricultural and Forestry Sciences
- Technical Sciences

== Head office ==
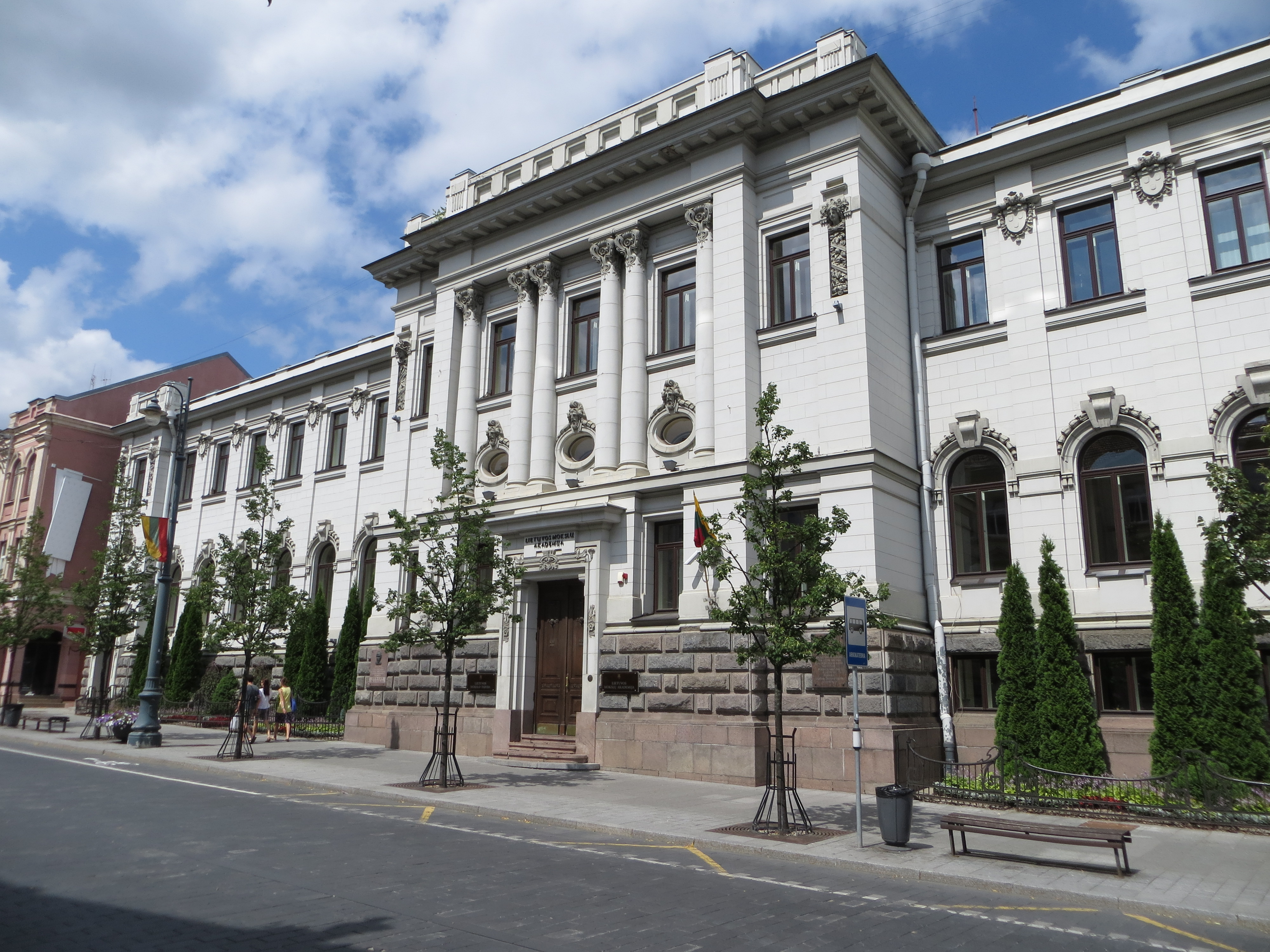
The Academy's head office building, Gediminas Avenue No. 3

The building of the Academy is prominently located on Gediminas Avenue, close to Vilnius Cathedral. It had been originally erected in 1906-1909 on a design by architect Mikhail Prozorov as the Vilnius branch of the State Bank of the Russian Empire. Under German occupation following the battle of Vilnius (1915), it was used as a military hospital. Then during the brief period of independent Lithuanian control over Vilnius, it was used from December 1918 by the Trade and Industry Bank as its head office, but that ended as Lithuanian forces had to withdraw. Following Poland's takeover of the city, the building in 1921 became the Vilnius branch of the Polish National Loan Bank, then from 1924 of the latter's successor Bank Polski SA. During World War II it served as headquarters for the German commissar of the Vilnius district, then from July 1944 as seat of the Council of the People’s Commissars (Council of Ministers) for Soviet-ruled Lithuania.

In 1956, the Soviet authorities decided to relocate the Academy in the building, a decision eventually implemented two years later.

== Presidents ==
- Vincas Krėvė-Mickevičius (1941)
- Mykolas Biržiška (1941–1942)
- Vladas Jurgutis (1942–1943)
- Vincas Mykolaitis-Putinas (1943–1944)
- Juozas Matulis (1946–1984)
- Juras Požela (1984–1992)
- Benediktas Juodka (1992–2003)
- Zenonas Rokus Rudzikas (2003–2009)
- Valdemaras Razumas (2009–2018)
- Jūras Banys (2018-2026)
- Vytautas Nekrošius (from 2026)

== Publications ==
- Acta Medica Lituanica
- Baltica : an international yearbook of Baltic Sea geology, geomorphology and paleontology
- Biologija
- Chemija
- Ekologija
- Energetika
- Filosofija. Sociologija
- Geografija
- Geologija
- Lituanistika
- Pheromones
- Menotyra
- Žemės ūkio mokslai
