= Nekrošius =

Nekrošius is a Lithuanian surname derived from the Polish surname Niekrasz. Notable people with the surname include:

- Arvydas Nekrošius (born 1984), Lithuanian politician
- Eimuntas Nekrošius (1952–2018), Lithuanian theatre director
- Vytautas Nekrošius (born 1970), Lithuanian legal scholar and professor
