= Vilius Baldišis =

Lithuanian politician

Vilius Baldišis (born 5 January 1961) is a Lithuanian politician. In 1990 he was among those who signed the Act of the Re-Establishment of the State of Lithuania. He was the chairman of the board of the Bank of Lithuania from 1990 to 1993.
