= LBCoin =

National digital currency of Lithuania

- Industry: Fintech
- Founded: March 2018
- Headquarters: Lithuania

LBCoin is central bank digital currency (CBDC) issued by the Bank of Lithuania on July 23, 2020.

== Overview ==
The Bank of Lithuania has been developing the project since March 2018. It was presented on July 9, 2020, and on July 23, 2020, LBCoin was issued.

The exchange of tokens for commemorative coins was possible until January 23, 2023. On January 23, 2023, it became no longer available for purchase. After the electronic store became unavailable, all unsold digital tokens stored in it were destroyed.

By acquiring LBCoin, collectors receive six digital tokens selected at random. These tokens can be utilized to obtain a physical collector coin, kept within the Bank of Lithuania's LBCoin e-shop, shared as gifts, exchanged with fellow collectors, or transferred onto the NEM public blockchain network through a NEM wallet.

== Digital LBCoin ==
LBCoin tokens were initially issued on a private blockchain, where they are due to be burned within 36 months after the date of issuance. Participants had the option of transferring these tokens to the public NEM blockchain, where they will exist without any time limitations. The secondary market for LBCoin tokens is unregulated, but these tokens are listed and publicly traded on the EU-based New Capital Exchange.
