= Niekrasz =

Niekrasz is a Polish surname. Lithuanian form: Nekrošius. Notable people with the surname include:

- Ilza Sternicka-Niekrasz
- Janusz Niekrasz
