= Vladas Jurgutis =

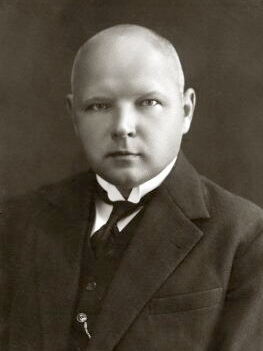
Portrait of Jurgutis

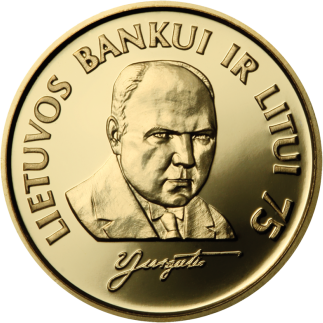
Commemorative Litas coin dedicated to 75th anniversary of the Bank of Lithuania, with a portrait of Vladas Jurgutis

Vladas Jurgutis (17 November 1885 in Joskaudai near Palanga – 9 January 1966 in Vilnius) was a Lithuanian priest, economist, and professor. As the first chairman of the Bank of Lithuania he is unofficially considered to be the "father of the Lithuanian litas."

== Biography ==
In 1902, Jurgutis graduated from Palanga Progymnasium and enrolled in the Kaunas Priest Seminary. After graduation in 1906, he continued his studies at the Saint Petersburg Roman Catholic Theological Academy and received a Master's Degree in 1910. From 1910 to 1913, he studied economics at the Ludwig-Maximilians-Universität München. In 1913, he served as a priest in Švėkšna and later in Liepāja. During World War I, Jurgutis retreated to Russia, where he worked as a pastor in Saratov and Astrakhan. Upon his return to Lithuania, he worked at the Kaunas Priest Seminary until 1922. Jurgutis became active in Lithuanian politics, but never officially quit the priesthood.

Jurgutis was one of the initiators of the revival of the Lithuanian Christian Democratic Party. He was elected to the Constituent Assembly of Lithuania (1920–1922) and headed a Finance and Budget Committee. From 1 January 1922 to 28 September 1922, Jurgutis served as the Foreign Minister of Lithuania in the Cabinet of Ernestas Galvanauskas. He resigned to become the first chairman of the Bank of Lithuania. He served in this position until 1929. From 1925, he taught at the University of Lithuania, from 1940 at Vilnius University. Jurgutis was the President of the Lithuanian Academy of Sciences from 1941 to 1943, when he, along with other prominent public figures, was arrested and transported to the Stutthof concentration camp by the Nazi authorities. He returned to Lithuania in 1945 and retired from public life.

In 1997, the Bank of Lithuania established Vladas Jurgutis scholarship and Vladas Jurgutis Award to encourage scientific activities in the area of research on Lithuania's banking, finance, money and macroeconomics.

Jurgutis was a member of the Catholic youth and student organization Ateitis.
