= Vladas Jurgutis Award =

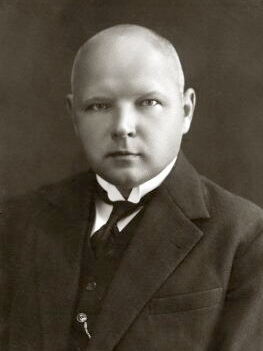
Award named in honoring Vladas Jurgutis

Vladas Jurgutis Award is an economic award, once a year granted by the Bank of Lithuania and Lithuanian Academy of Sciences. The aim of the Award is to encourage scientific activities in the area of research on Lithuania's banking, finance, money and macroeconomics. Award named after the father of Lithuanian Litas, Vladas Jurgutis.

== History ==
The Bank of Lithuania established Vladas Jurgutis Award in 1997 to perpetuate the merits of academic, professor and the first Governor of the Bank of Lithuania Vladas Jurgutis, also unofficially considered to be the "father of the Lithuanian litas."

Since 2008, after signing a co-operation agreement, the Award is being granted by the Bank of Lithuania and Lithuanian Academy of Sciences.

== The Award ==
The Award in the amount of LTL 50 000 (approx 14 480 €) is granted for significant works (published scientific articles, theses, monographs, textbooks, etc.) in the areas of Lithuanian economy and banking research. Applications for Vladas Jurgutis Award are accepted every year until 1 September. Candidates could be both Lithuanian and foreign scientists, students, researchers and specialists. When nominating a candidate for the Award, the following should be submitted to the Bank of Lithuania:

- recommendation of the natural or legal person that nominates the candidate;
- description of candidate's life and scientific activity, and list of works;
- works of the candidate for which he/she is nominated for the Award, reviews of the works submitted and feedback on them.

== Winners ==
- 1997: Alfonsas Žilėnas for influential works in the fields of banking and finance
- 1998: Stasys Sajauskas and Dominykas Kaubrys for their work Numismatics of the Grand Duchy of Lithuania
- 1999: Vladas Terleckas for his books and articles published from 1995 to 1999 on the history of Lithuanian banking
- 2008: Arūnas Dulkys, Juozas Galkus and Stanislovas Sajauskas for their work Lithuanian Coins
- 2010: Antanas Tyla for The Treasury of the Grand Duchy of Lithuania During Twenty Years of War 1648–1667 and economist Vytautas Valvonis for his work carried out over the last five years in the field of banking, particularly credit risk management, also for the practical benefits in improving risk management in banks, enhancing the soundness of banking operations
- 2012: Vladas Terleckas for his monograph Banking in Lithuania 1795–1915
- 2015: Gediminas Vaskela for his monograph National Aspects in Lithuania’s Economic Policy, 1919–1940
- Since 2018 the award is 10,000 EUR and is awarded annually during the Annual Meeting of the Baltic Economic Association
- 2018: Agnė Kajackaitė, Uri Gneezis and Joel Sobel for collective work Lying Aversion and the Size of the Lie, American Economic Review, 108(2), 419-453
- 2019: Matthias Weber and Arthur Scharm for collective work The Non-Equivalence of Labor Market Taxes: A Real-Effort Experiment, Economic Journal, 127(604):2187–2215.

== See also ==
- List of economics awards
