= Bank of Lithuania =

Central Bank of Lithuania

Bank of Lithuania Lietuvos bankas (in Lithuanian)

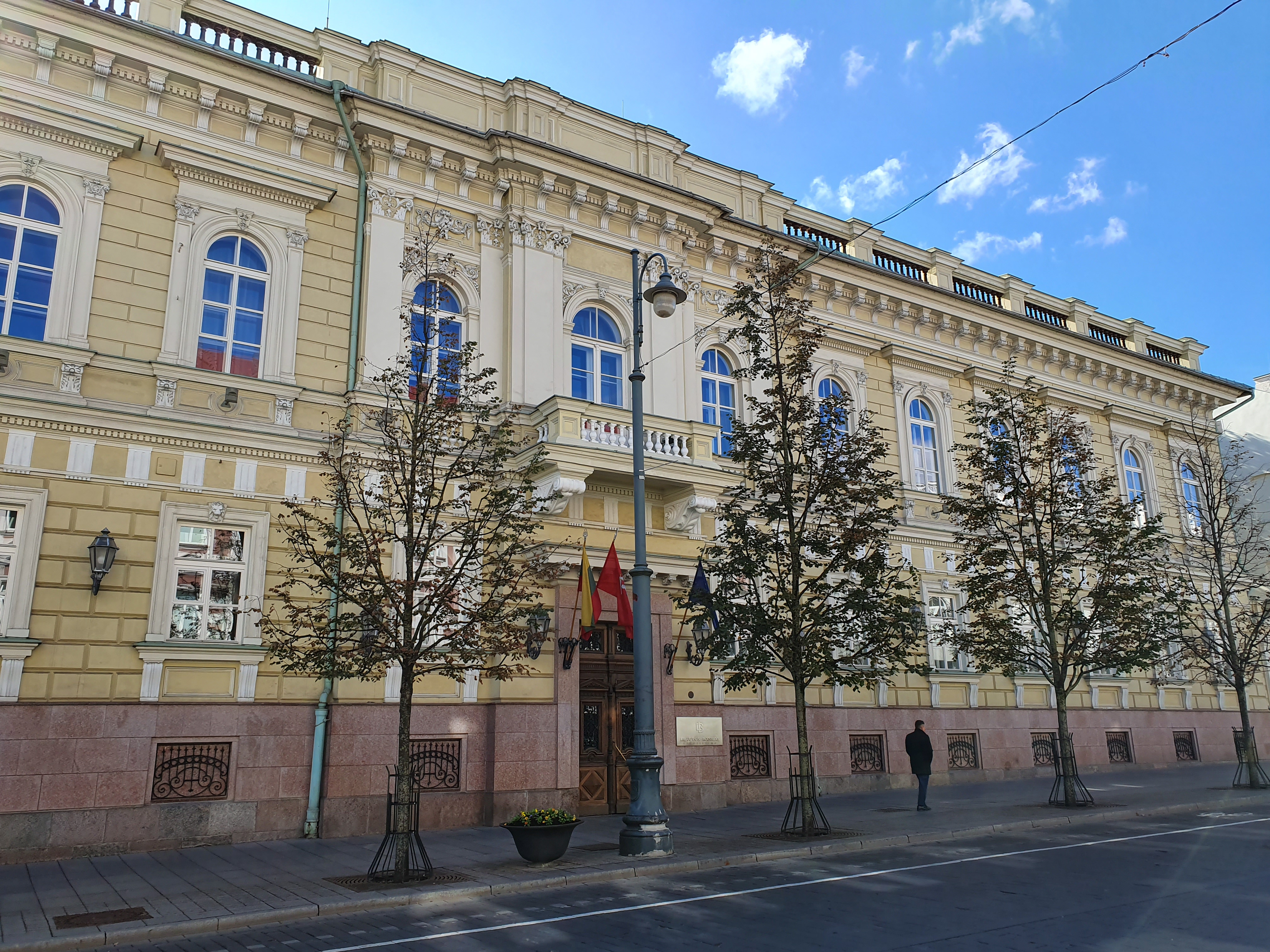
- Head office in Vilnius
- Central bank of: Lithuania
- Headquarters: Vilnius
- Coordinates: 54°41′10″N 25°17′00″E
- Established: 27 September 1922; 1 March 1990
- Ownership: 100% state ownership
- Chairman: Gediminas Šimkus
- Reserves: $1.310 billion
- Website: lb.lt

The Bank of Lithuania (Lithuanian: Lietuvos bankas) is the name of two homonymous institutions, respectively in existence from 1922 to 1943 in Kaunas, and since 1990 in Vilnius. The current Bank of Lithuania is the national central bank for Lithuania within the Eurosystem. It is fully owned by the Lithuanian state.

The interwar Bank of Lithuania issued the Lithuanian litas between 1922 and 1940. The current Bank of Lithuania also issued a national currency of the same name from 1993 until end-2014, when Lithuania adopted the euro as its currency.

Whereas it is governed under a national framework of accountability, the Bank of Lithuania increasingly implements policies set at the European Union level. In addition to its Eurosystem role, it is the national competent authority for Lithuania within European Banking Supervision. It is a voting member of the respective Boards of Supervisors of the European Banking Authority (EBA), European Insurance and Occupational Pensions Authority (EIOPA), and European Securities and Markets Authority (ESMA). It is Lithuania's designated National Resolution Authority and plenary session member of the Single Resolution Board (SRB). It provides the permanent single common representative for Lithuania in the Supervisory composition of the General Board of the Anti-Money Laundering Authority (AMLA). It is also a member of the European Systemic Risk Board (ESRB).

== History ==
=== Interwar period ===
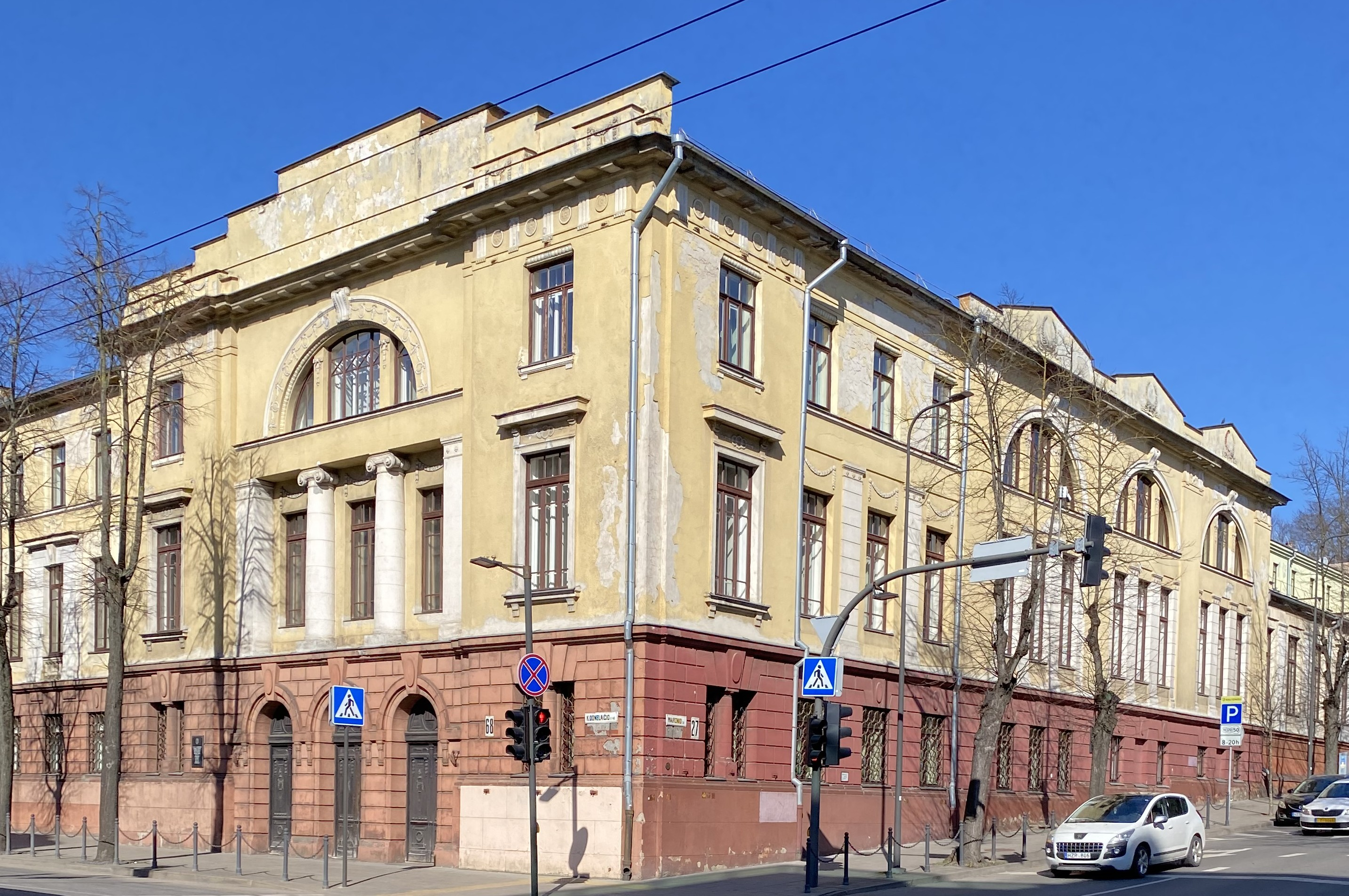
Former branch building of the State Bank of the Russian Empire in Kaunas, used by the Bank of Lithuania from 1922 to 1928

The Bank of Lithuania building in Kaunas, the institution's headquarters from 1928 to 1943 and lately its local branch

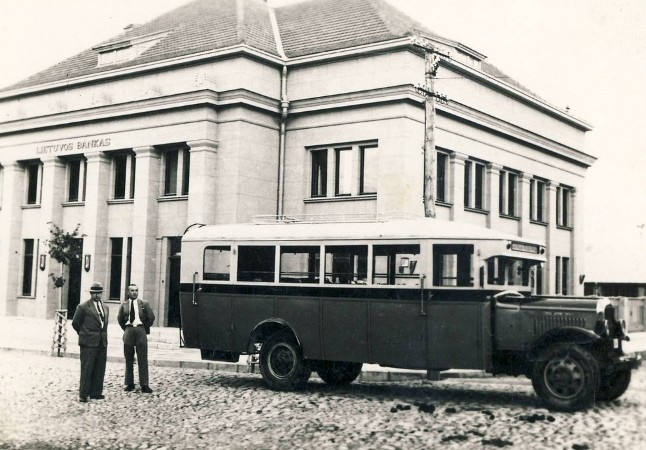
Bank of Lithuania branch in Raseiniai, inaugurated in 1934

Following the Act of Independence of Lithuania in February 1918, the authorities did not immediately introduce a new currency as several of the neighbouring countries did, but kept using the German ostmark issued by the German-controlled Darlehnskasse Ost. The ostmark was printed in multiple languages, including in Lithuanian as the auksinas (lit. 'the golden'). The Bank of Lithuania was only established in 1922 in Kaunas, the temporary capital of Lithuania. It held its first board meeting on 27 September 1922, and started operations on 2 October. Its first governor was Vladas Jurgutis. About four-fifths of its equity capital was state-owned, with the remainder owned by municipalities, companies and individuals.

The first task of the bank was to replace the German ostmarks and ostrubels in circulation in the country with the new Lithuanian litas. The bank's mandate extended beyond a pure monetary authority, as it also entailed a developmental role with the possibility of allocating short-term credit to industry and agriculture.

In 1924 - 1927 the Bank of Lithuania building in Kaunas was constructed with sumptuous interior and splendid exterior in order to replace the Russian Empire times building as bank's headquarters. Moreover, the Residential Building for Employees of the Bank of Lithuania in Kaunas was constructed in 1925.

On 31 March 1931, the bank became a member of the Bank for International Settlements (BIS).

=== World War II and the bank's gold reserves ===
Following the Soviet occupation of the Baltic states including Lithuania, the Bank of Lithuania was nationalized by decision of the occupation authorities of 1 August 1940, and merged into the State Bank of the USSR on 3 October. Under German occupation, the Provisional Government of Lithuania petitioned the occupation forces to restore the Bank of Lithuania as a bank of issue, but that demand was rejected and the bank's status was reduced to that of a mere commercial bank. Its operations were terminated by the occupation authorities on 3 March 1943.

At the time of the Soviet invasion, the Bank of Lithuania held gold reserves at the Bank of England (2.9 tons), Bank of France (2.2 tons), Sveriges Riksbank, Swiss National Bank, as well as the BIS (632 kg) and several American banks. As in Latvia and Estonia, the Soviet authorities directed these institutions to transfer the gold to the State Bank of the USSR. The Swedish and Swiss central banks obliged, but other institutions were more cautious given the ambiguous status of state continuity of the Baltic states. The United States declined to recognize the Soviet annexation and thus kept the gold immobilized, a position informed by the Briand–Kellogg Pact of 1928, the Stimson Doctrine of 1932 and explicitly stated in Executive Order 8484 of 10 July 1940 followed by the Welles Declaration of 23 July 1940. Also in July 1940, the Bank of England sequestrated the Baltic gold reserves deposited in its custody. The BIS, advised by legal scholar Dietrich Schindler Sr, assessed that the Soviet invasion had deprived the Baltic states of their capacity to form 'a national independent will' and that therefore the requests of their central banks should be rejected as made under duress. Partly influenced by the BIS position, the Bank of France similarly declined to act on the Soviet requests, and, despite France's own situation under German occupation, maintained that position when similar requests were made by the Bank of Lithuania under German occupation after June 1941.

The gold held in America was eventually expended by the US government to fund the Lithuanian Diplomatic Service in exile, similarly as with the other Baltic Legations, including its operations in London from 1951 onwards. In 1954, the Bank of France argued that the "uncertainty regarding the existence or disappearance of the Latvian state", in the absence of a clear position from the French government, prevented a transfer or use of the gold under its custody. The United Kingdom did not formally acknowledge the Soviet claims, but eventually agreed to sell the Lithuanian gold held at the Bank of England for $10.4 million in 1967, of which 9 million were transferred to the USSR and 1.4 million to British claimants who had lost assets in the Baltic states during the Soviet annexation. The terms of that transaction specified that the USSR renounced all of its possible claims for the Baltic gold, while the UK agreed not to raise further demands regarding lost British assets. Following that precedent, negotiations were held throughout the 1970s between France and the Soviet Union on the matter but without success. In 1976, the BIS also briefly considered a similar arrangement, but its members rejected the idea. More attempts to use the gold under French custody were made in the 1980s, without any concrete result.

=== Restoration ===
The present Bank of Lithuania was established on 1 March 1990. In late 1991, it recovered the gold that had remained immobilized at the Bank of France. The BIS in 1992 similarly returned the gold it had kept, minus 62 kg retained by the BIS in compensation for assets it had lost in the Soviet invasion. Also in 1992, the Bank of Lithuania received compensation from the UK (paid in gold) and Sweden for the reserves originally placed under their respective jurisdictions. On 30 June 1992, it recovered its membership and shareholding in the BIS.

Logo adopted in 2005

In September 1992, the Bank of Lithuania spun off the network of branches it had inherited from the former Gosbank, as State Commercial Bank of Lithuania. The newly formed entity was headquartered in Vilnius and had operations in Akmenė, Alytus, Anykščiai, Birštonas, Druskininkai, Ignalina, Jonava, Kaunas, Klaipėda, Kėdainiai, Kretinga, Marijampolė, Mažeikiai, Palanga, Panevėžys, Plungė, Rokiškis, Šiauliai, Šilutė, Švenčionys, Tauragė, Telšiai, Ukmergė, Utena, Vilkaviškis, and Žirmūnai. That bank was eventually liquidated in 1998.

The Lithuanian litas, introduced on 25 June 1993 after several years of monetary turmoil, was pegged to the US dollar in 1994. In late 1995, Lithuania entered a severe banking crisis, following similar developments in Estonia in 1992 and in Latvia in early 1995. The Bank of Lithuania had been slow to act on findings of problems by its supervisors, and had also discouraged the entry of foreign banks into the Lithuanian market. Overall the crisis involved a larger number of banks (both private and state-owned) and its resolution was slower than in the two other Baltic countries.

=== 21st century ===
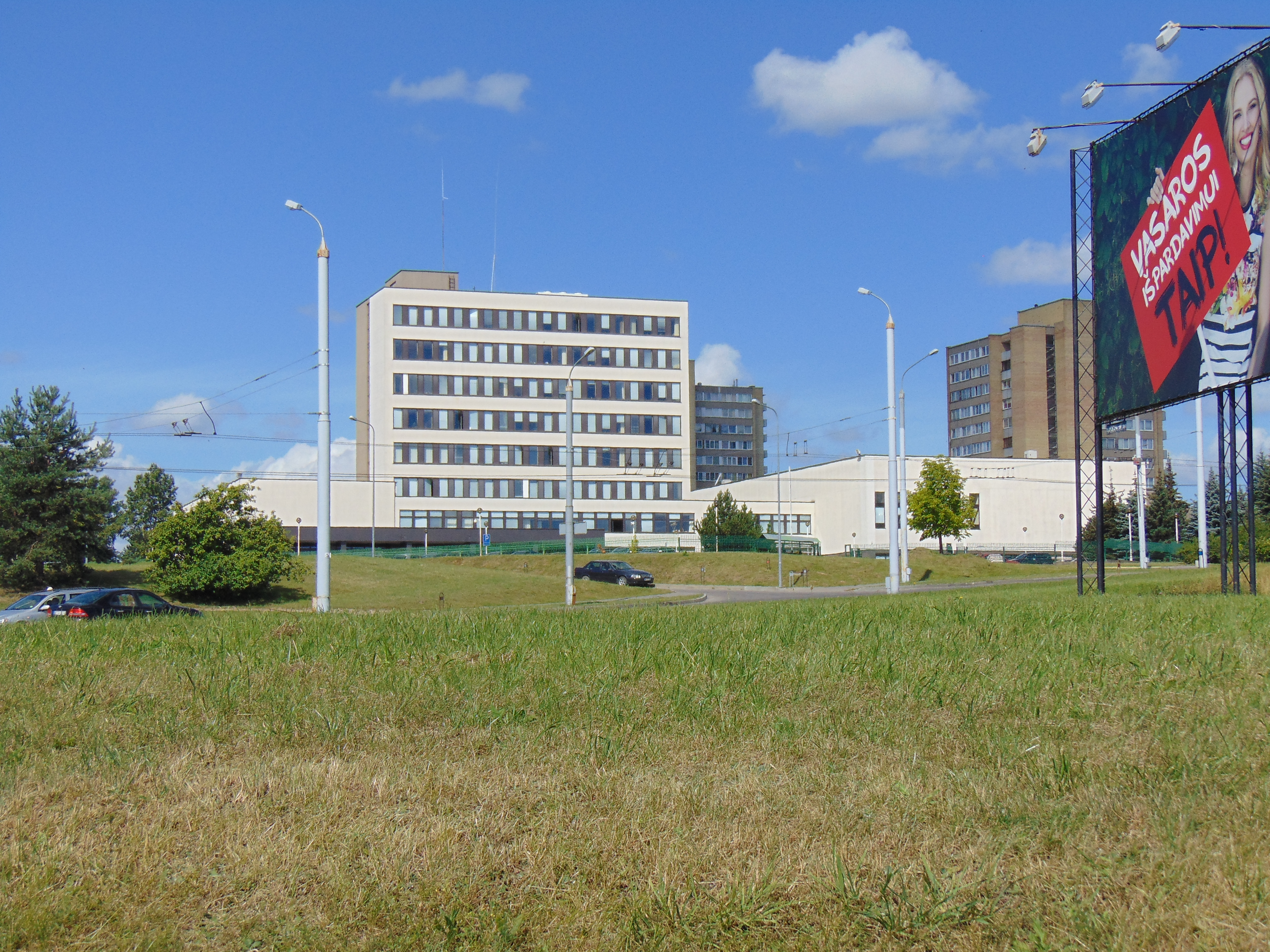
Building of the Bank of Lithuania's integrated financial sector supervision service, Žirmūnų g. 151 in northern Vilnius

On 2 February 2002, in view of the increasing orientation of the Lithuanian economy towards the EU and the prospect of its EU membership, the litas's peg was shifted from the US dollar to the recently created euro.

On 2 January 2012, the Bank of Lithuania took over the capital market supervisory duties previously granted since 1992 to the Securities Commission of the Republic of Lithuanian, as well as insurance supervision previously performed by the Insurance Commission (Lithuanian: Lietuvos Respublikos draudimo priežiūros komisijos). It thus became the single supervisor of the entire Lithuanian financial sector, aside from accounting and auditing supervisory operations carried out directly by the Ministry of Finance. Around the same time, the bank streamlined its territorial footprint by closing its branch in Klaipėda.

On 1 January 2015, Lithuania adopted the euro as its currency. On that same day, the Bank of Lithuania became Lithuania's national competent authority within the system of European Banking Supervision, and its National Resolution Authority within the newly established Single Resolution Mechanism.

In 2017, the Bank of Lithuania identified financial technology (fintech) as a strategic direction of its activity. In particular, the Bank of Lithuania was the local contact point for the banking license granted by the European Central Bank to Revolut in December 2018. In 2020, it introduced an experimental central bank digital currency, the LBCoin.

== Operations ==
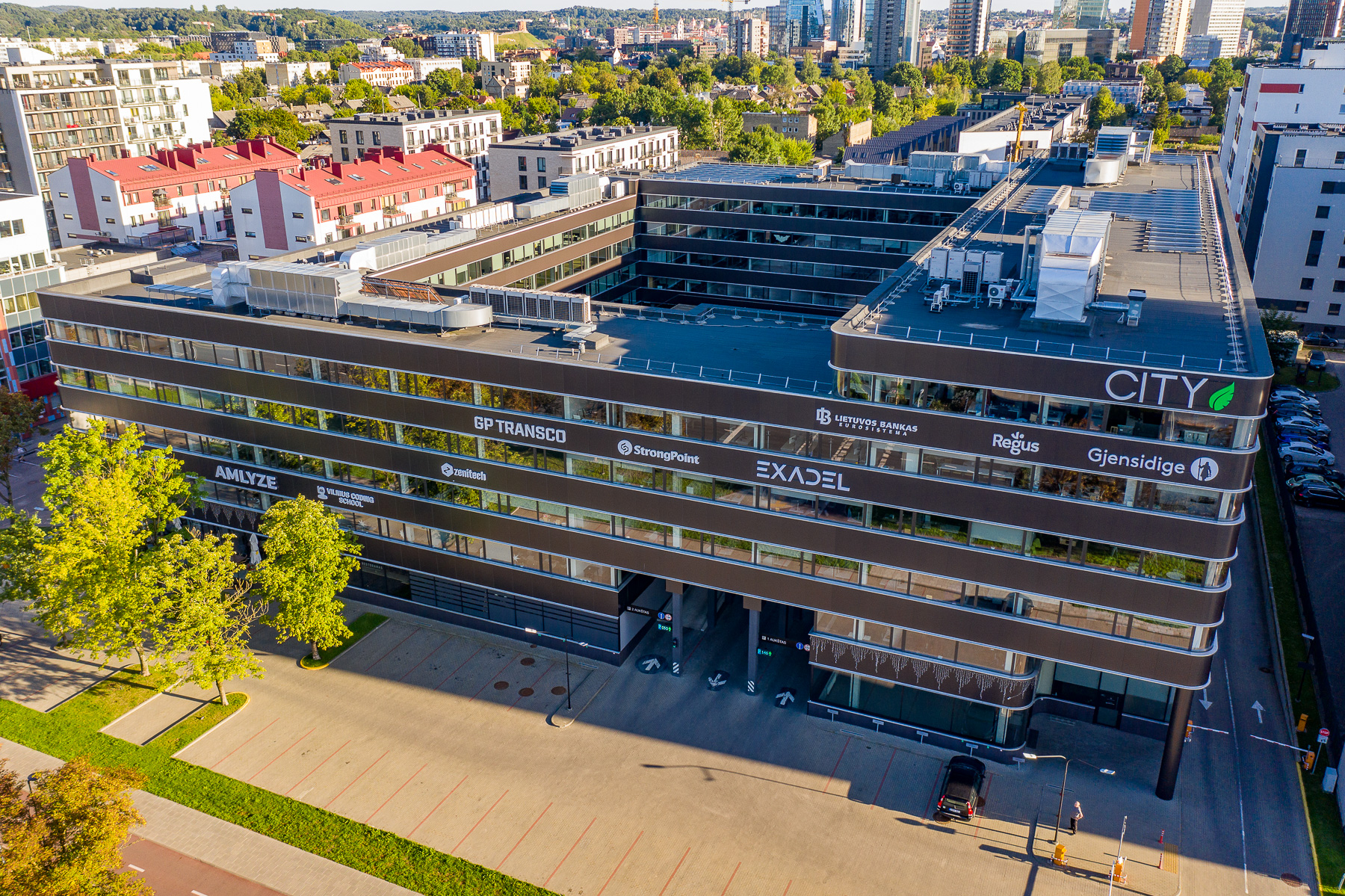
Office building at Žalgirio g. 90 in northern Vilnius, where the Bank of Lithuania maintains services

According to the Bank's official website, the Bank of Lithuania performs these primary functions:

- maintaining price stability,
- formulating and implementing the monetary policy,
- acting as an agent of the State Treasury.

As a member of the European System of Central Banks, the Bank of Lithuania participates in the formulation and implementation of the monetary policy of the eurozone.

It is governed by a board consisting of a chairperson, two deputy chairpersons and two members. As of 2025, the bank had around 700 employees.

== Buildings ==
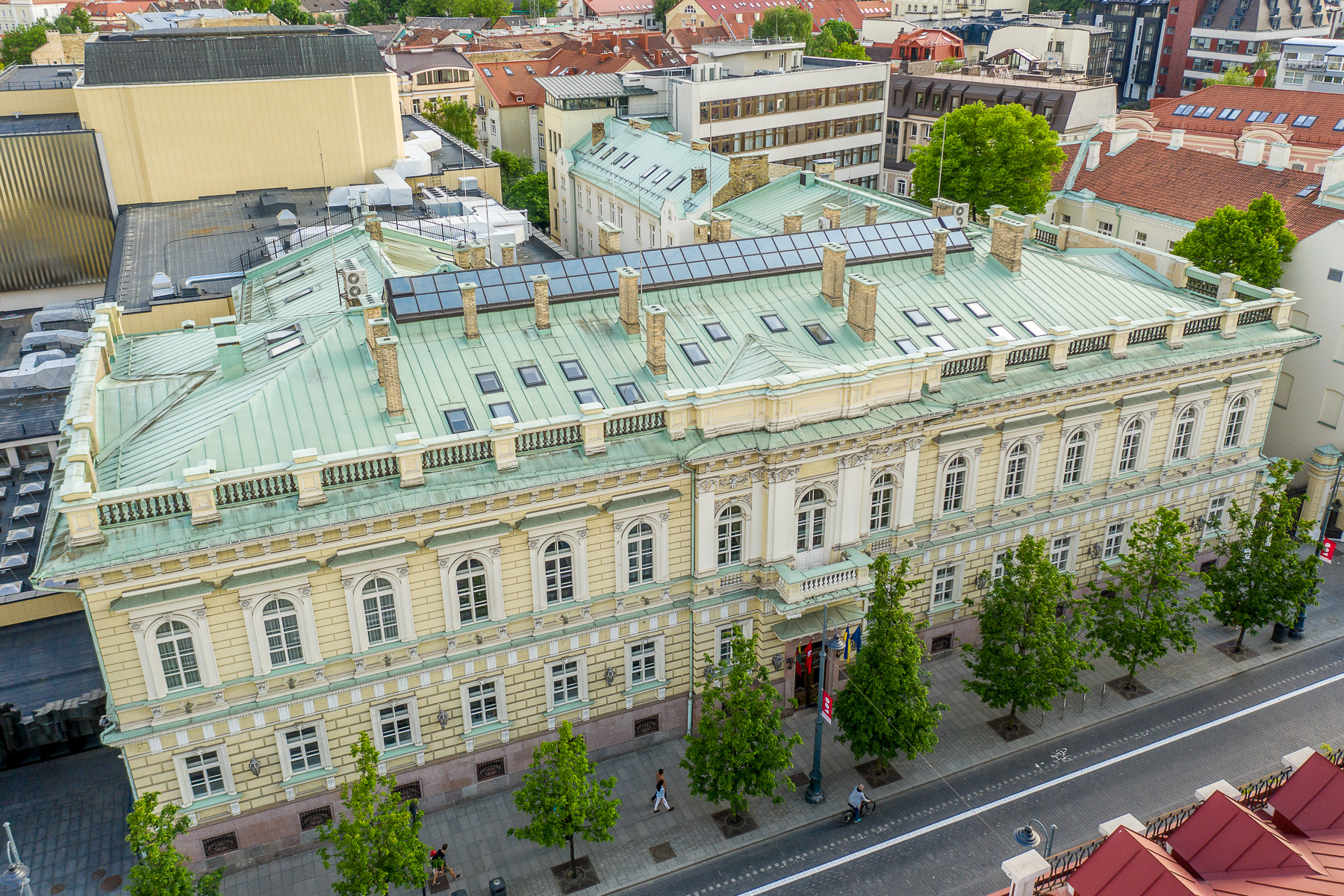
Aerial view of Bank of Lithuania head office

In 1922, the Bank of Lithuania was initially located in the Kaunas branch building of the State Bank of the Russian Empire, together with the Council of the State and several ministries. In 1923, the bank offered to purchase the building for itself, but the government refused. As a consequence, in 1924 the Bank of Lithuania held an international architecture competition for a new head office building across the street. The construction of the new building, designed in neoclassical style by architect Mykolas Songaila, started in 1925. It was inaugurated on 8 December 1928. It features sculptures by Kajetonas Sklėrius and paintings by Jonas Mackevičius and Justinas Vienožinskis. During the Soviet occupation it served as the local branch of the State Bank of the USSR. As of 2025, it was used as a cash office by the Bank of Lithuania.

The Bank of Lithuania's current head office un Vilnius is located at number 6 of Gediminas Avenue. It was originally built for the Vilnius Land Bank in 1889–1891, which stayed there until World War II. The property was subsequently repurposed as the local head office of the State Bank of the USSR in the Lithuanian Soviet Socialist Republic. The Bank of Lithuania was located there from its creation in March 1990. Following Lithuanian independence it was renovated in 1994-1997, and a money museum opened on its premises in 1999.

As of 2025, the Bank of Lithuania also maintained two separate facilities in the northern part of Vilnius, on Žalgirio street and Žirmūnų street respectively.

== Leadership ==
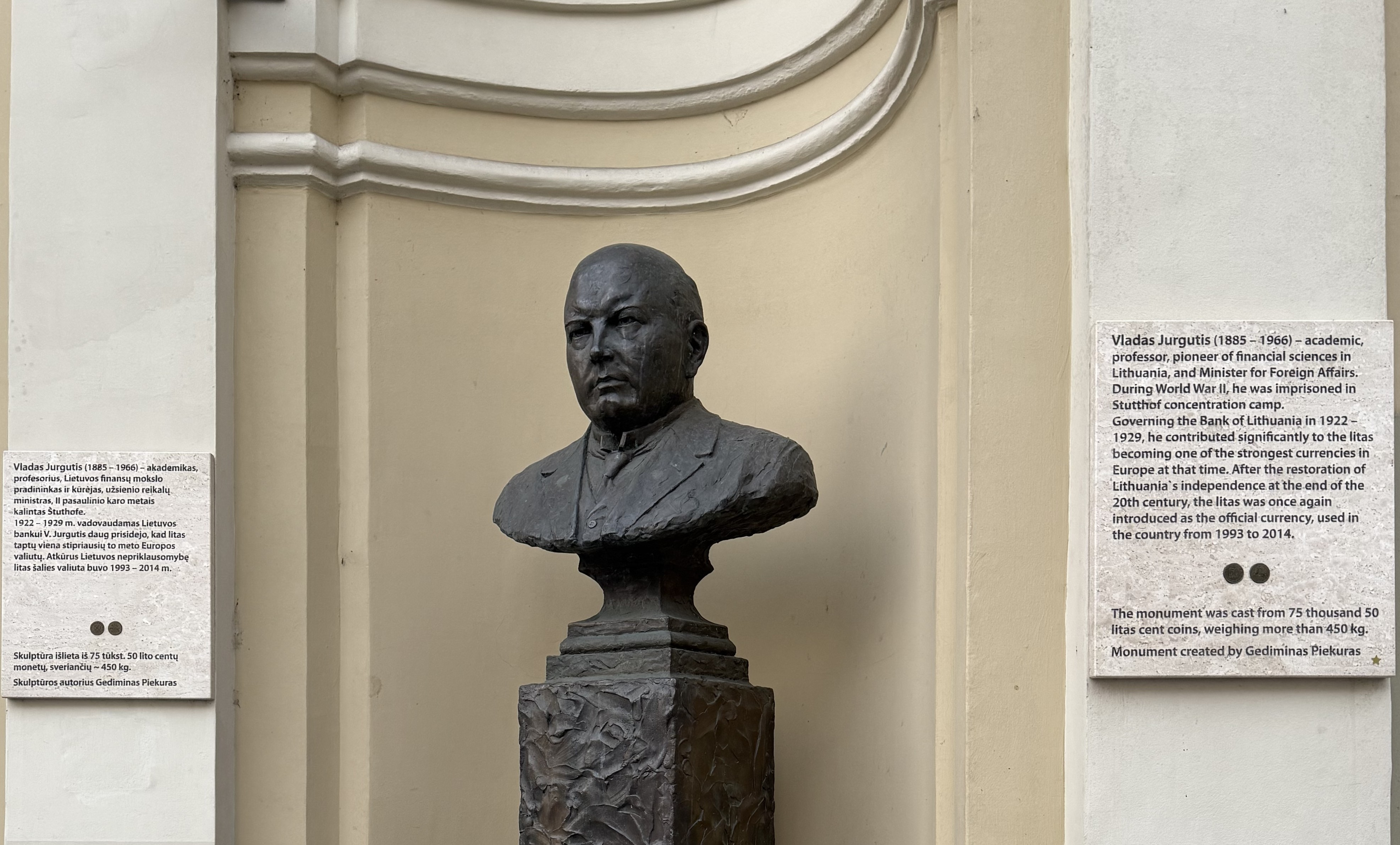
Bust of Vladas Jurgutis (1885-1966), first governor of the Bank of Lithuania, next to the bank's head office in Vilnius

Governors of the Bank of Lithuania during the interwar period and WWII:

- Vladas Jurgutis (September 1922 – October 1929)
- Vladas Stašinskas (June 1930 – September 1938)
- Juozas Tūbelis (October 1938 – September 1939)
- Juozas Paknys (October 1939– September 1940 and October 1941 – October 1942)
- Aleksandras Drobnys (September 1940 – June 1941)
- Povilas Kopustinskas (June – October 1941)
- Juozas Bergas (October 1942 – June 1943)

Chairmen of the board of the Bank of Lithuania since 1990:

- Bronius Povilaitis (March – July 1990)
- Vilius Baldišis (July 1990 – March 1993)
- Romualdas Visokavičius (March – October 1993)
- Kazys Ratkevičius (November 1993 – January 1996)
- Reinoldijus Šarkinas (February 1996 – April 2011)
- Vitas Vasiliauskas (April 2011 – April 2021)
- Gediminas Šimkus (since April 2021)

== See also ==
- Vladas Jurgutis Award
- Economy of Lithuania
- List of central banks
- List of financial supervisory authorities by country
