= Vilnius University Faculty of Communication =

- Vilniaus universiteto Komunikacijos fakultetas
- Established: 1991
- Dean: Renata Matkevičienė
- Academic staff: 107 (2018 May)
- Students: 1087 (2018 May)
- Undergraduates: 881 (2018 May)
- Postgraduates: 184 (2018 May)
- Doctoral students: 22 (2018 May)
- Location: Vilnius, Lithuania
- Website: http://www.kf.vu.lt/en

The Vilnius University Faculty of Communication (Lithuanian: Vilniaus universiteto Komunikacijos fakultetas) is one of the faculties of Vilnius University. It provides education and training for communication and information specialists and organizes research in these scientific domains. Renata Matkevičienė became the dean of faculty in 2022.

== History ==
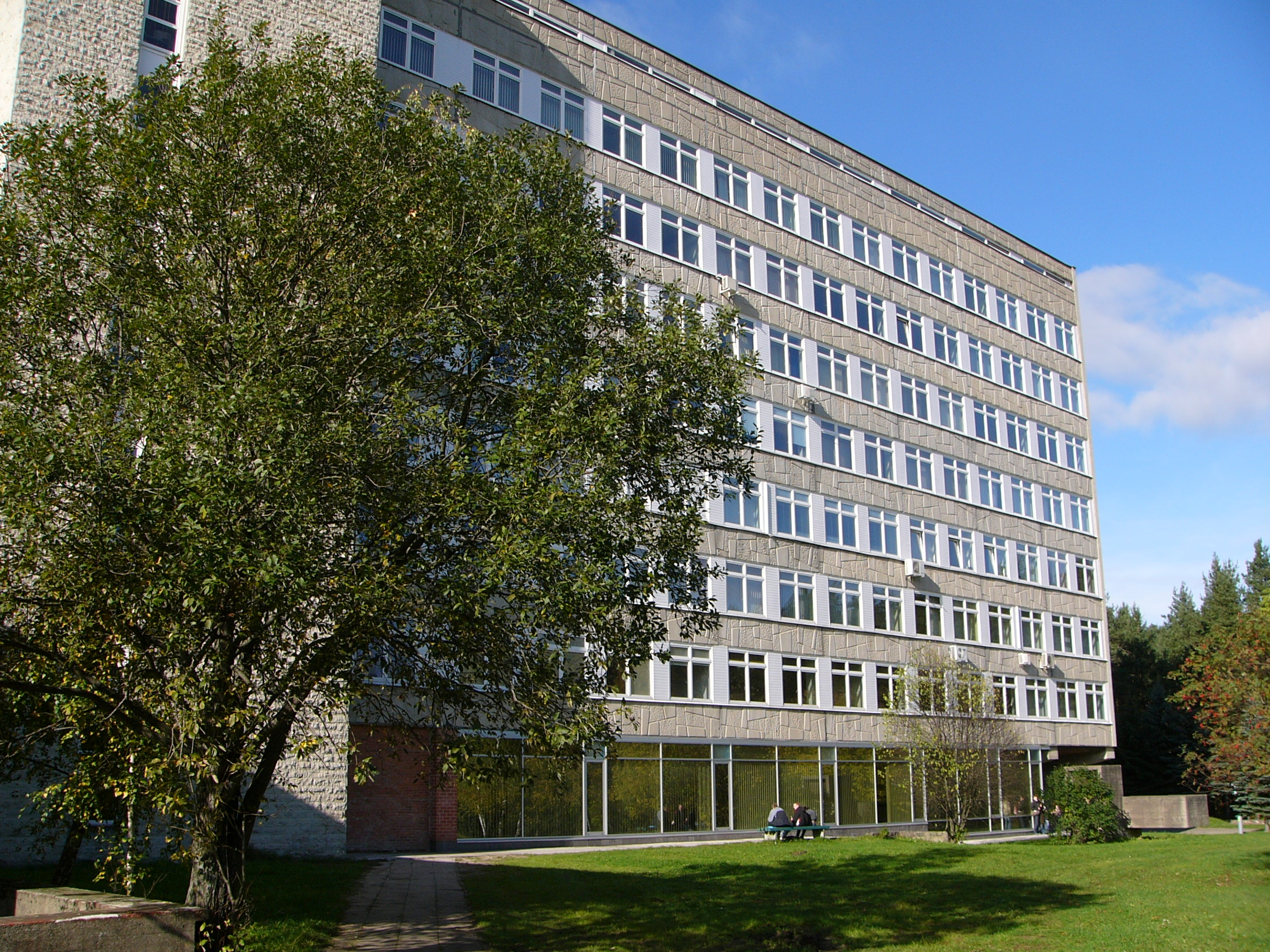
Faculty of Communication

The Vilnius University Faculty of Communication was established on 18 June 1991, in response to the rapid development of information services and the increasing need for cohesive research in communication technology. The Vilnius University Council passed a resolution to establish the Faculty of Communication on the recommendation of the former Departments of Library Science, Information Systems, Book Science and Bibliography, Radio and Television Journalism and Print Journalism. This reorganization was initiated as part of the granting of legal status to the university by the Seimas of the Republic of Lithuania in 1990, shortly after the nation's restoration as an independent state.

In 1992, an Informatics study programme opened development opportunities for other specialities, such as business information management (1997) and publishing (2005). The winning of the TEMPUS project encouraged the creation of two Master's programmes. In 1993, PhD programs opened. More than ten years later, Professors E. Macevičiūtė, A. Glosienė and O. Janonis joined the faculty after the successful completion of the habilitation procedure in 2004.

The Faculty further enlarged and changed its organizational forms: during 2000-2001, several Departments became Institutes. In 2003, a separate International Centre of Knowledge Economy and Management was allowed to teach certain Master's programmes and conduct the habilitation procedure. In 2007, the Centre's study programmes were restored to the Faculty of Communication. In 2009, these Master's programmes were updated and reintroduced.

Starting from 2010–2011, the Faculty introduced study programmes on international communication taught entirely in English and based on the ERASMUS Project European Master's Studies in Professional Communication.

== Activities ==
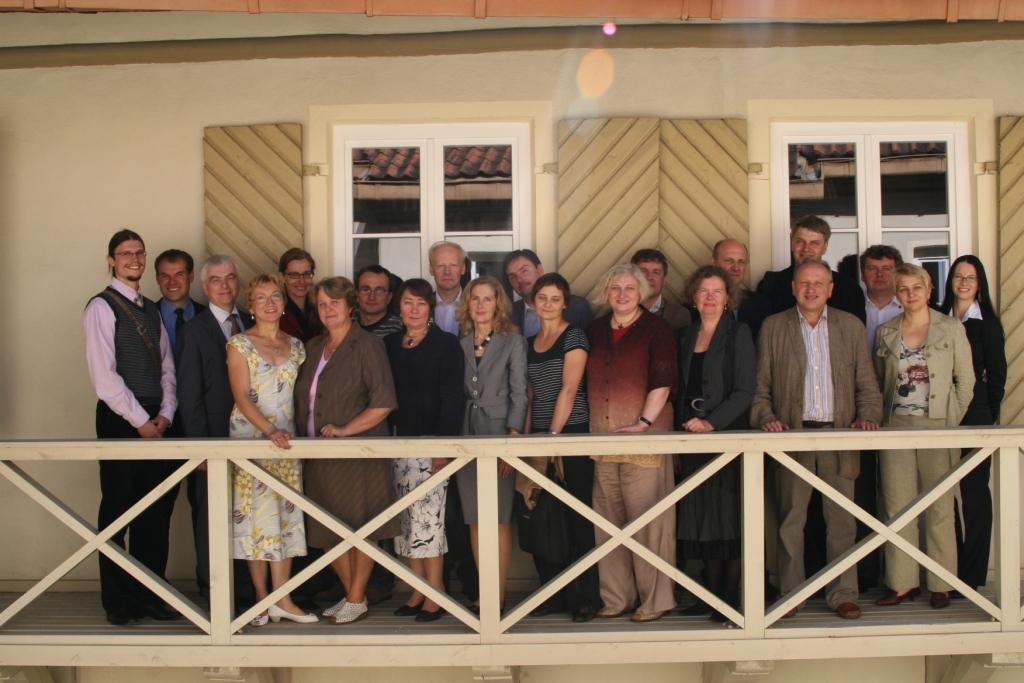
Scientists of the Faculty of Communication, September 1, 2009, the day of the Start of a New School Year

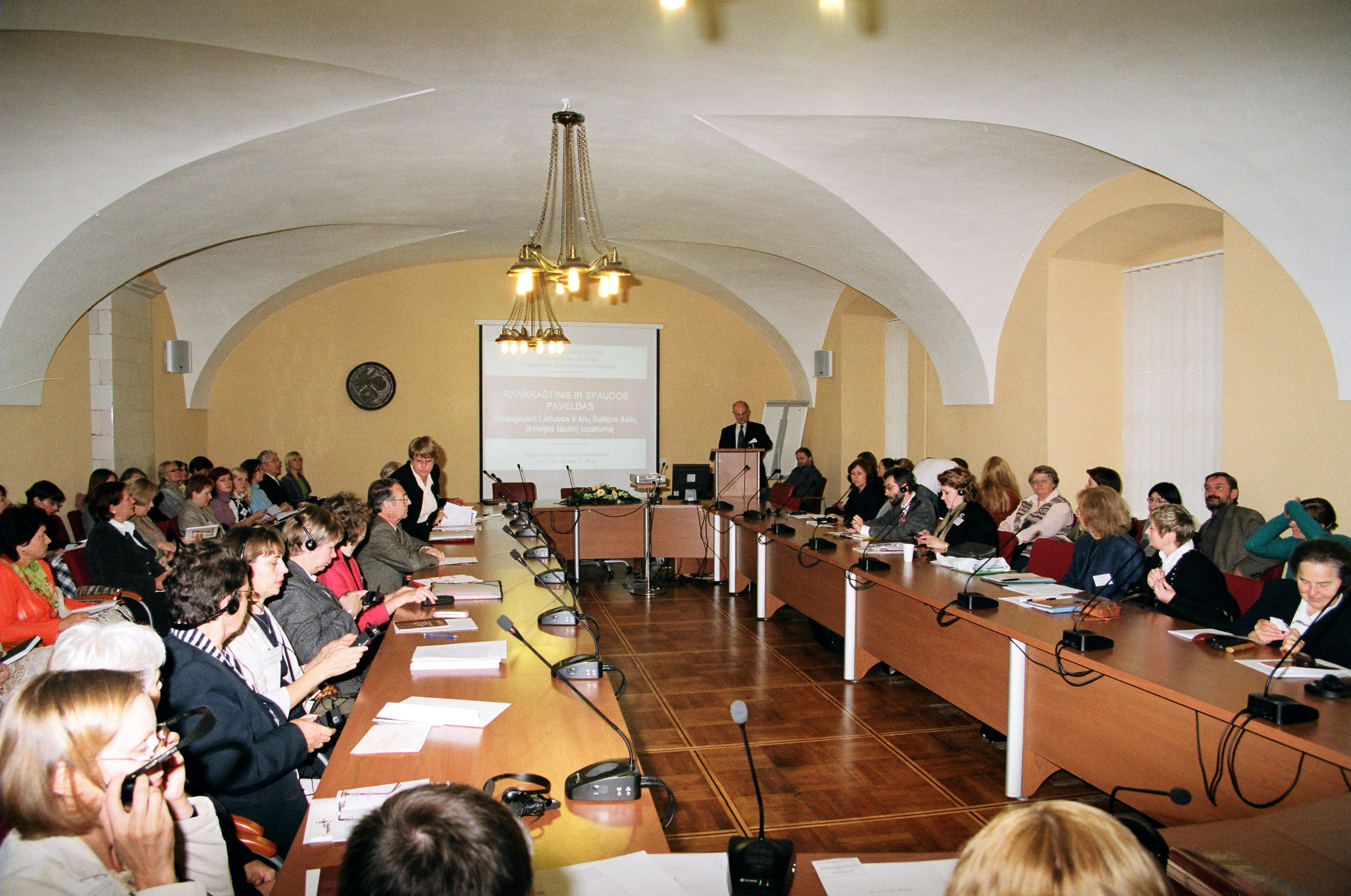
International heritage conference September, 2007

The staff of the Faculty includes 79 researchers – the largest team of communication and information scientists in Lithuania.

The twelve academic departments of the Faculty have been engaged in fundamental and applied research of very broad scope, ranging from knowledge economy to Lithuanian heritage. Faculty scientists work in three areas:

1. Lithuanian studies: philological, cultural and interdisciplinary aspects. Research and development;
2. Information and communication in traditional and network societies;
3. Heritage development and communication.

The Faculty is linked with more than 20 social partners, and as many as 100 enterprises are available for student internship.

The Faculty's researchers produce more than 70 scientific publications every year. The Faculty also organizes annual conferences, publishes 4 scientific journals, and provides 9 study programmes for bachelor's degree and 11 programmes for master's degree. One programme, International Communication, is taught entirely in English. After successful completion of these programmes, students may proceed to doctoral studies in the area communication and information. During over 20 years of the Faculty's functioning, the doctoral studies have been successfully accomplished by 50 students.

== Studies ==
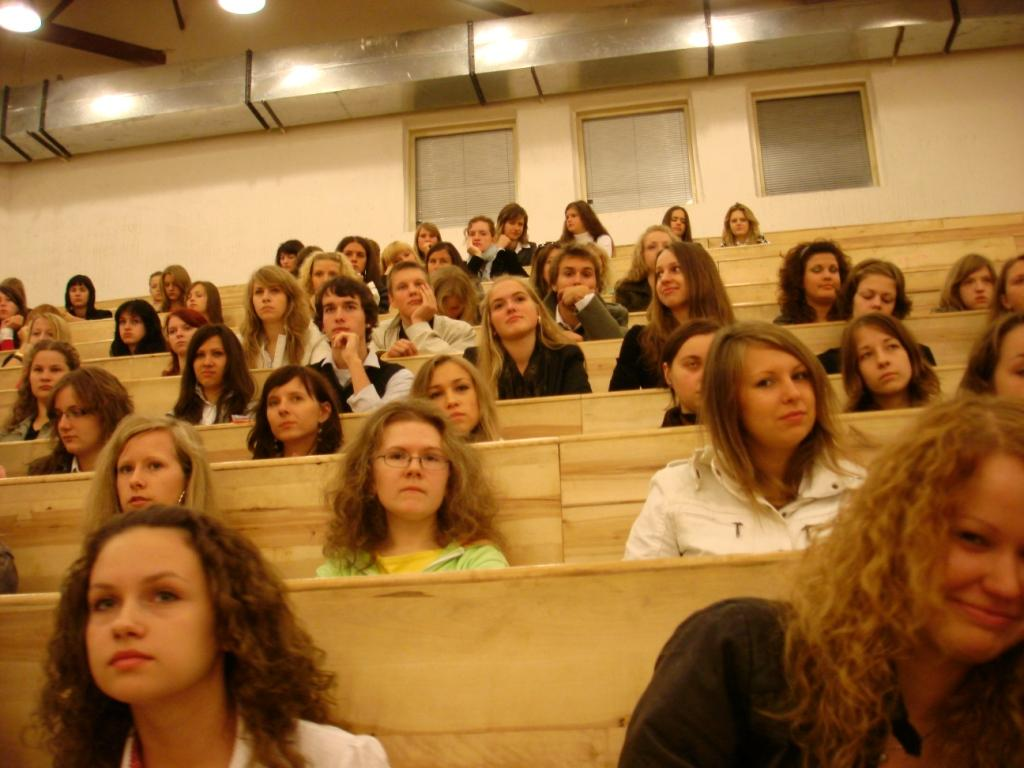
Lecture in Faculty of Communication

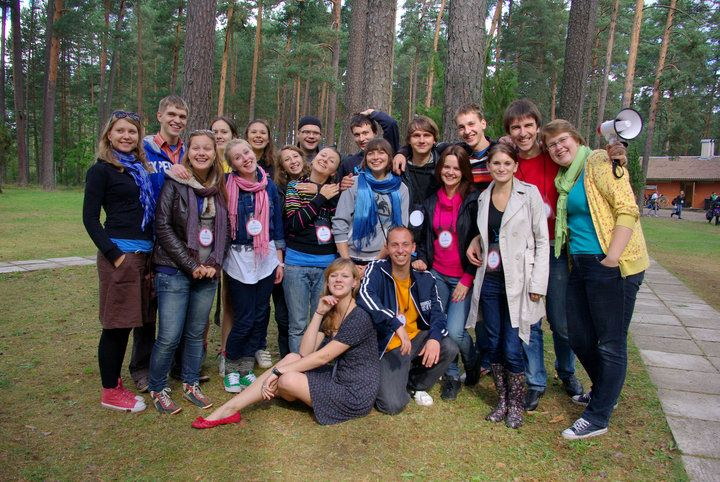
Students of Faculty of Communication at the "Students' camp", 2010

The Faculty offers three levels of degrees, bachelor studies, master's studies and doctoral studies. Each is designed to produce specialists with skills such as:

- organizing and managing information within special information structures
- drafting, designing and implementing information policies, communication strategies, and campaigns for cultural, scientific, business, administration and media institutions, and
- conducting applied scientific research in communication and information domains.

As of 2018 May, 1087 students are enrolled. Among them, 881 are taking the 4-year Bachelor's course and over 184 are studying for the master's degree. After successfully completing their studies, students are awarded the Bachelor's or master's degree in Communication and Information. The number of study programmes has grown from 2 to 17 during the Faculty's 27 years. In 2008 and 2010, the Faculty conducted a self-examination of the study programmes.

The Faculty cooperates with 107 academic partners from 31 countries. Its lecturers and students take part in ERASMUS/LLP academic exchange programmes and bilateral or multilateral academic collaboration programmes across the European Union.

Programmes based on the ERASMUS Project European Master's Studies in Professional Communication adopted a competence learning system. Students engage in real-life situations provided by various international companies. Students choose in equal parts between compulsory and optional subjects. Courses are taught in English. Courses are offered for groups of 15-20 within the premises of partner Universities.

== Student organizations ==
=== Student Representation ===
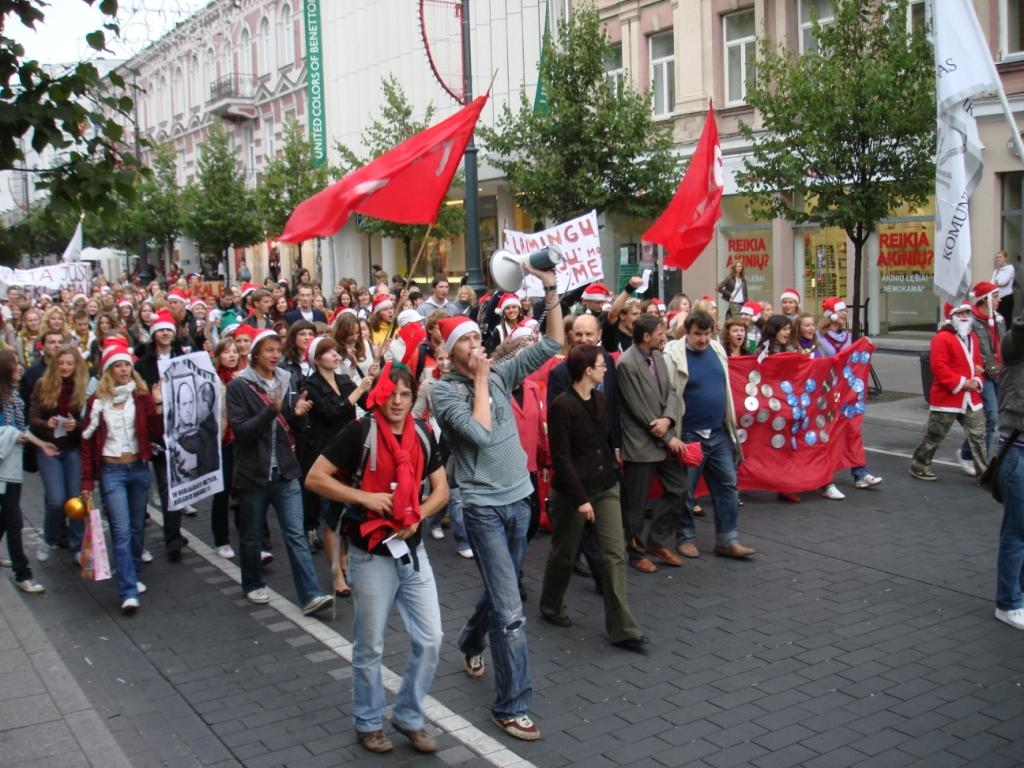
Students and lecturers participating in a new study year's march on 1 September 2006

The Student Representation of the Faculty of Communication (SR FC) represents student interests and provides consultations on academic and social issues.

=== Student Science Association ===
The Student Science Association of the Faculty of Communication (SSA FC) is an independent, voluntary, non-profit student organization. It involves scientists willing to share their experience and skills in scientific work. SSA FC organizes courses, public lectures, discussions and conferences, publishes an e-bulletin and encourages student science initiatives. The Association engages in joint projects with other active student science associations of Vilnius University, and maintains contact with the social partners of the Faculty.
