= Vytautas Nekrošius =

Lithuanian politician and professor

Vytautas Nekrošius (born 1970) is a Lithuanian politician and civil legal scholar, PhD, Professor at the Faculty of Law of Vilnius University, the Faculty of Law's, since 2016 president of the Lithuania Lawyers Association (LLA). He is to replace Ignas Vėgėlė, Chairman of the Council of the Lithuanian Bar Association. Since 2019 Nekrošius is a member of council of Molėtai District Municipality.

Member of Lithuanian Green Party.

== Education ==
In 1993 Vytautas Nekrošius graduated from Vilnius University, the Faculty of Law. In 1994 he was awarded an LL.M. from Goethe University Frankfurt in Germany. He was enrolled as a doctoral student and obtained a PhD in social sciences, for the doctor thesis and after habilitation thesis in civil procedure law.

== Award ==
- Order for Merits to Lithuania
